= Jacobus van Looy =

Dutch painter and writer (1855–1930)

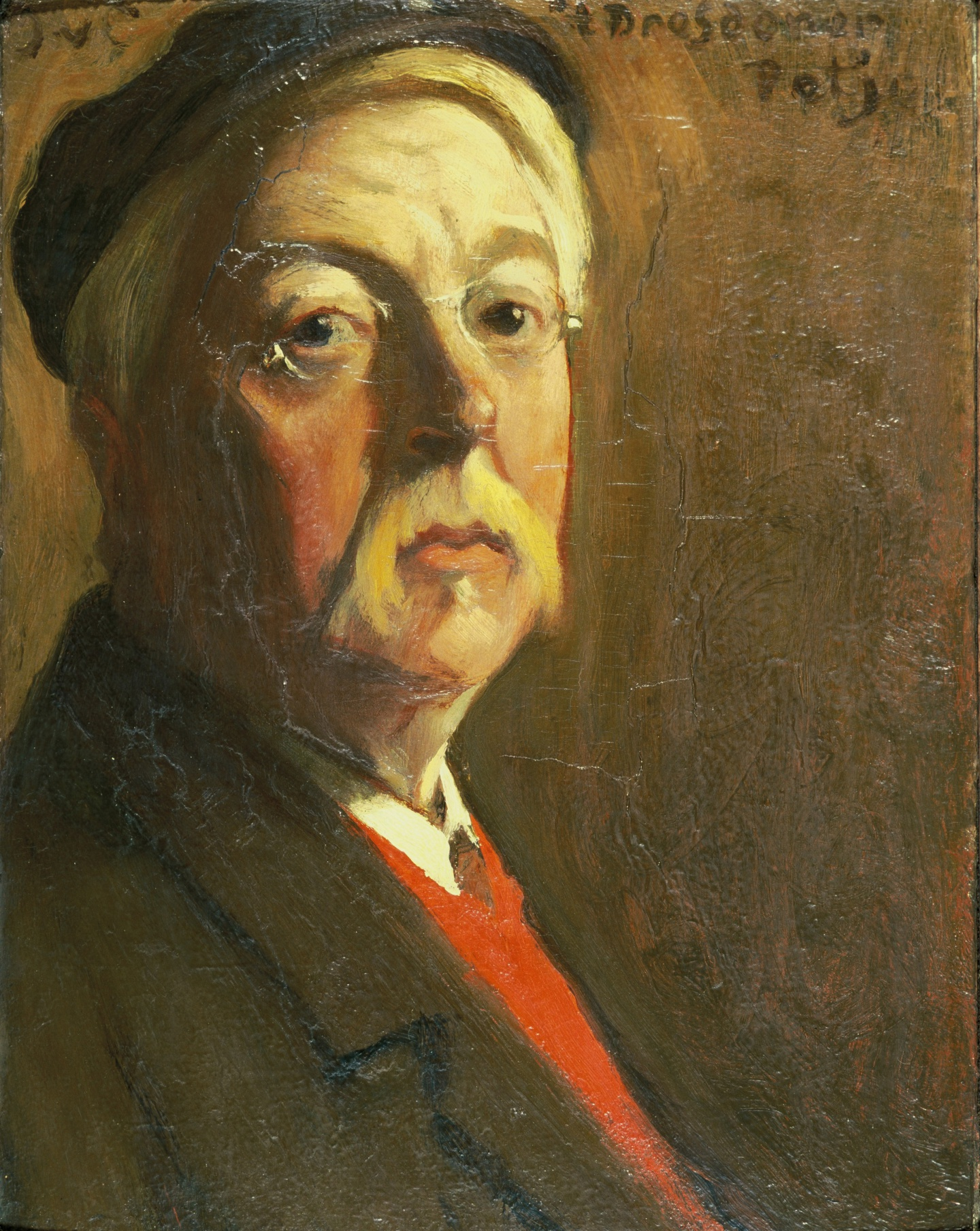
- With a Dresden-style cap Self-portrait
- Born: 2 September 1855; Haarlem, Netherlands
- Died: 24 February 1930 (aged 74); Haarlem, Netherlands
- Known for: Painting

Jacobus (Jac) van Looy (12 September 1855 – 24 February 1930) was a Dutch painter and writer.

== Biography ==
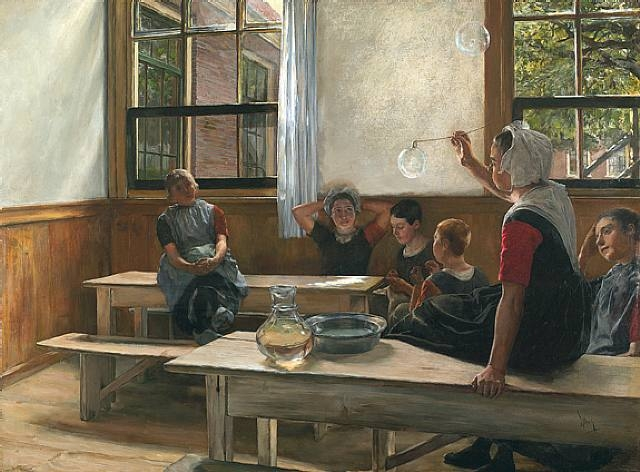
Haarlem orphans painted by Charles Frederic Ulrich in 1884. Though Van Looy was already travelling by that time, this painting shows the uniform for Haarlem orphans that he wore until his teens, with one red sleeve and one blue sleeve. It also shows the interior of what is now the Frans Hals Museum, when it was still an orphanage.

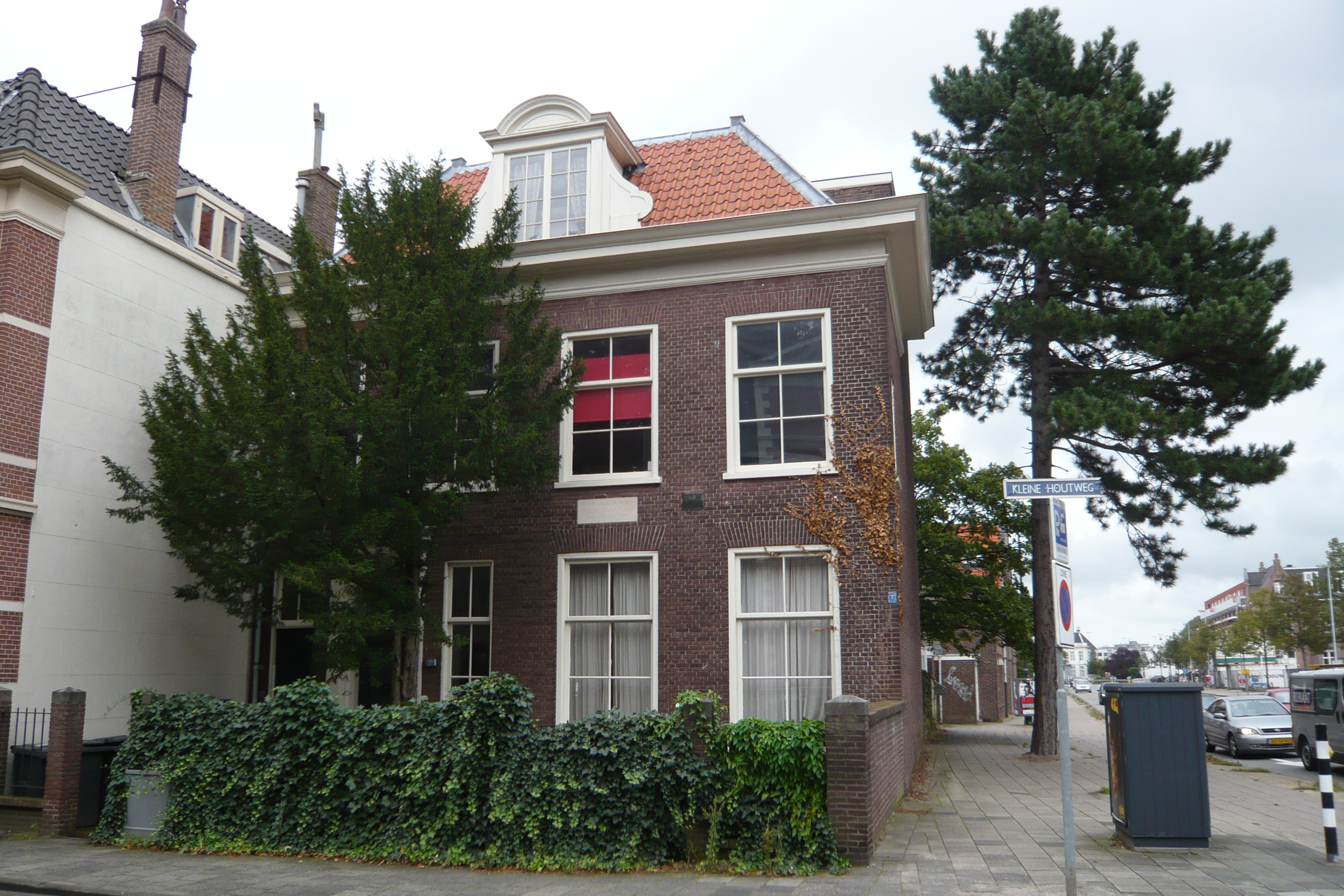
House where Jacob van Looy lived until he died, and where a museum was opened after the death of his widow from 1949 to 1967.

Van Looy was the son of a carpenter, but his father lost his job when his eyesight began to fail. His mother died when he was five years old and when his father died soon afterwards, he ended up in the Haarlem municipal orphanage. He trained to become a house painter, but was able to follow drawing classes, from 1877 at the "Rijksacademie van Beeldende Kunsten" in Amsterdam.

In 1884, he received the Prix de Rome, which allowed him to travel. The years 1885-86 he spent traveling through Italy, Spain, and Morocco. He was a pupil of August Allebé, Jan Jacob Goteling Vinnis, Dirk Jan Hendrik Joosten, and Hendrik Jacobus Scholten. There he began to draw sketches, which are collected in two volumes. Until 1894 he lived in Amsterdam, when he married Titia van Gelder and moved to Soest. In 1901, he spent another year in Spain and Morocco. He moved back to Haarlem in 1913, when the orphanage where he grew up was converted to the Frans Hals Museum. He bought a house on the corner of the Haarlemmerhout park, where he was often seen taking walks and served as an inspiration for Godfried Bomans, among others. After his death this house was converted to a museum in his name (now only visible with a plaque on the facade).

== Paintings ==
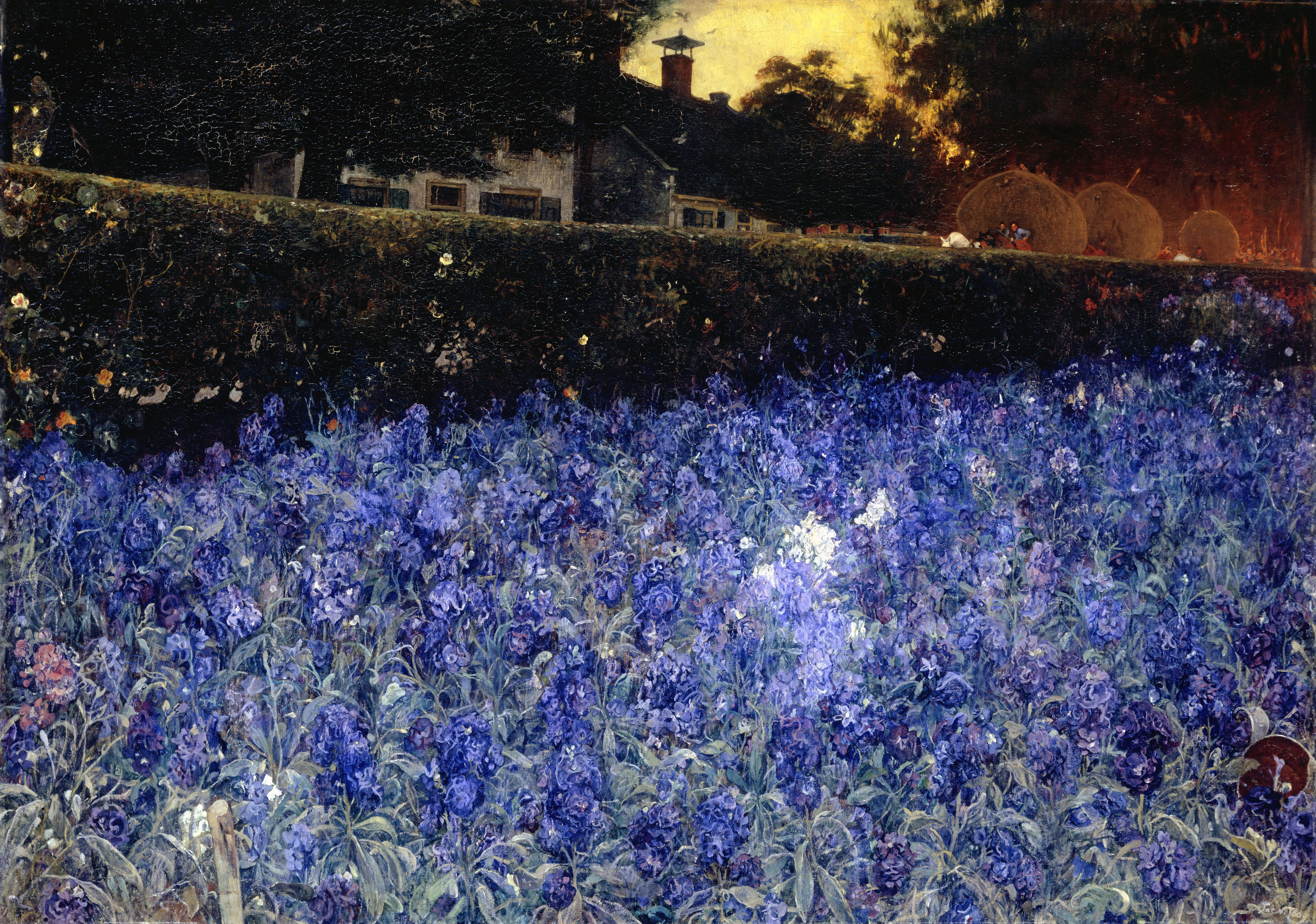
Summer Luxuriance, c. 1900

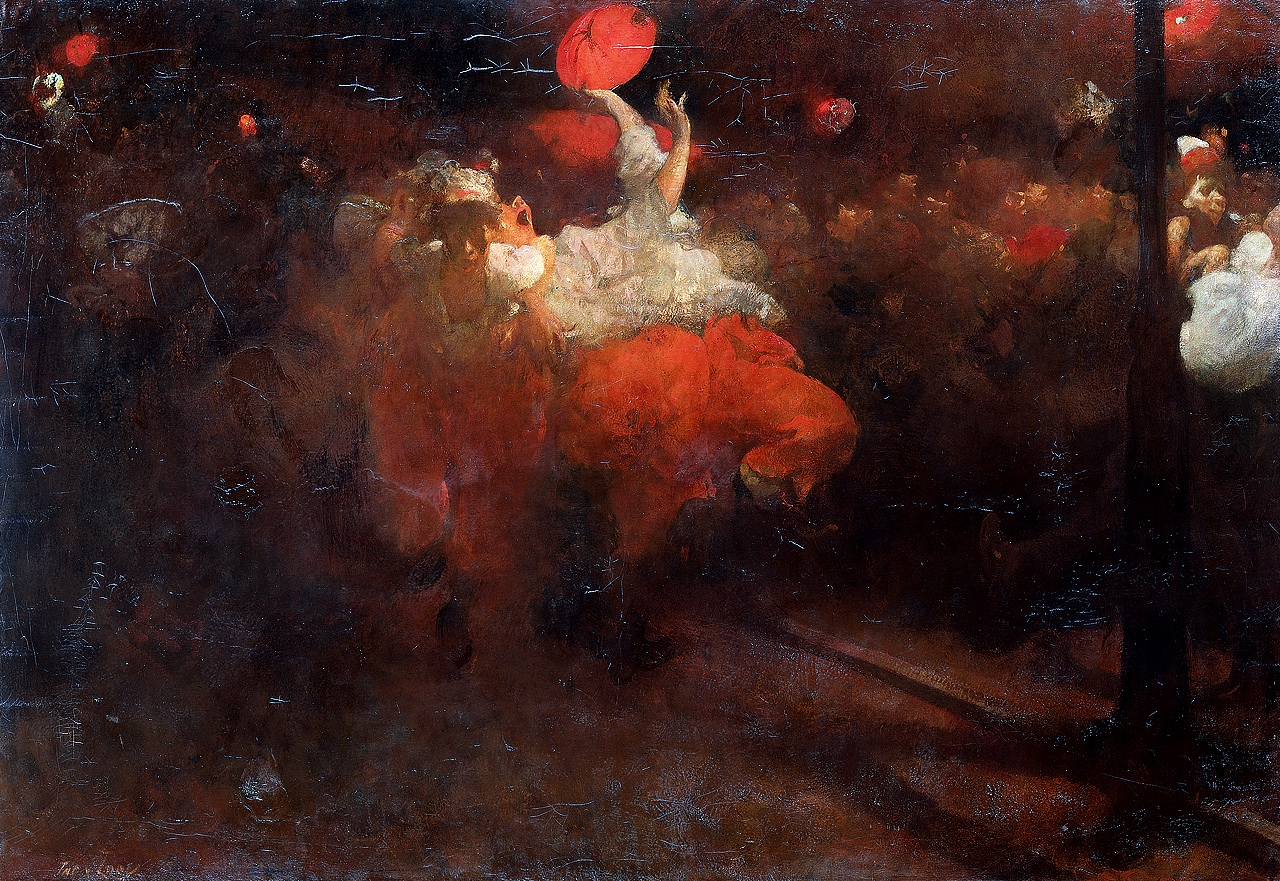
Hartjesdag, c. 1900

For many years, he belonged to the editorial staff of the literary monthly De Nieuwe Gids (The New Guide). He is one of the most typical authors of De Beweging van Tachtig (The Movement of the 1880s). He was a member of the Amsterdam artist society Arti et Amicitiae. He idolised words, especially in his travel books. He was an Epicurean and wrote with imagination about the outward appearance of our everyday life. The Teylers Museum has a collection of his drawings from his travels. His pupils were Charlotte Bouten, Chris Huidekooper, Ella Pauw, Johan Vlaanderen, and Jan Vogelaar.

== Literary works ==
- Proza (1889)
- Gekken (1892)
- Feesten (1903)
- De wonderlijke avonturen van Zebedeus (1910–1925)
- 'Een praatje over "vertalen" met eenige vertaalde fragmenten' (1912)
- Reizen (1913)
- Jaapje (1917). in the DBNL
- Feesten (1920)
- Jaap (1923)
- De wonderlijke avonturen van Zebedeus (1925)
- De wonderlijke avonturen van Zebedeus (1925)
- Nieuw proza (1929)
- Op reis (1929)
- Jacob (1930)
- Gedichten (only scans available) (1932)
- Jaapje (1963)
- Proza (1981)

His work has been hailed as epic, with tender humanity and a gentle wisdom. Notable written works include the short story, De Dood van mijn Poes (The Death of My Cat) and his autobiograpthe Netherlandshy, Jaapje (Jimmy). Many of his paintings are to be found in the Netherlands' leading museums.

== Huis van Looy ==
In the years 1948-1976 the museum "Huis van Looy" became a gallery for modern art exhibitions. When it closed its doors, most of the collection and the accompanying archive was given to the Frans Hals Museum.

== Jacobus van Looy Prize ==
Since 1985, a five-yearly Jacobus van Looy Prize has been awarded by the Stichting Jacobus van Looy (Jacobus van Looy Foundation) to artists who have excelled both as a writer and a painter.

Prizewinners have included:

- 2005:Wim T. Schippers
- Armando
- Lucebert
- Charlotte Mutsaers
- Breyten Breytenbach
