= He Hua Temple =

Buddhist temple in Amsterdam

- Fo Guang Shan He Hua Tempel
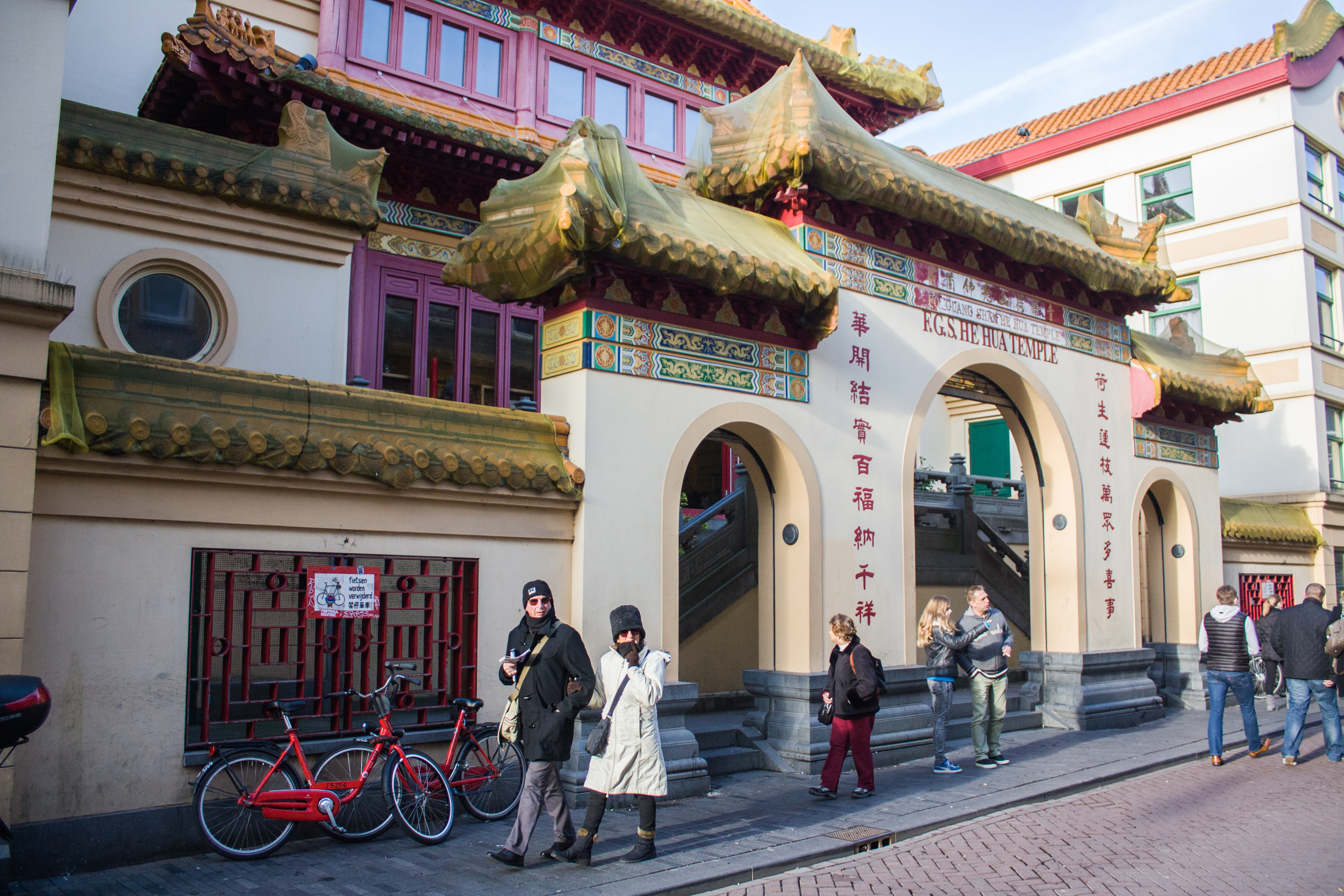
- He Hua temple

Religion
- Affiliation: Buddhist
- Sect: Fo Guang Shan
- Status: Active

Location
- Location: Zeedijk 106, 1012 BB, Amsterdam
- Country: The Netherlands
- Interactive map of He Hua Temple
- Coordinates: 52°22′26″N 4°54′00″E

Architecture
- Architect: Fred Greven
- Founder: Frank Man
- Completed: 2000

Website
- www.ibps.nl

Fo Guang Shan He Hua Temple (Chinese: 佛光山荷華寺; pinyin: Fó Guāng Shān Hé Huá Sì; lit. 'Buddha's Light Mountain Lotus Flower Temple', or simply He Hua Temple, is a Buddhist temple located at Zeedijk 106–118, Chinatown in Amsterdam. It is the largest Buddhist temple built in the traditional Chinese palace style in Europe. The temple is part of the Fo Guang Shan, and the BLIA. It is also the first Chinese Buddhist temple building in Europe.

== History ==
At the end of Zeedijk street, right before Nieuwmarkt was originally a convent for nuns which was founded in 1475. The convent was later used as shop premises. In 1944, the last remnants of the building were demolished after the Jewish owners were deported during World War II. It was turned into a playground in the 1950s.

Mid-1990s, there was a nuisance of drug addicts in the Chinatown of Amsterdam. A land lot was vacant at Zeedijk 106-118. Architect Aldo van Eyck installed playground equipment there. The organization NV Economisch Herstel Zeedijk was active with the economic recovery of Zeedijk. They weighed the options for the vacant lot. Frank Man, chairman of the Chinese Entrepreneurs Association Amsterdam, and the restaurant owner Fu Wen Lo, supported Chinese entrepreneurship in the neighborhood. They thought a large Buddhist temple was necessary as a crowning achievement of Amsterdam's Chinatown. In 1992, the mayor of Amsterdam Schelto Patijn told the Chinese community that "something is allowed there". In 1994, it was officially decided to build a Buddhist temple. Architect Fred Greven had multiple projects in the Zeedijk and joined the meetings. The Fo Guang Shan was interested in building a temple. Despite Greven's lack of experience in designing Buddhist temples, he was appointed and travelled to Taiwan to learn about Buddhist temples. Greven met the leaders of the Fo Guang Shan, most importantly Hsing Yun (founder of the Fo Guang Shan), and a Taiwanese woman who managed global Buddhist real estate. They agreed to finance the temple's construction.

The temple was commissioned by the Buddha's Light International Association based in Taiwan. It was designed by the Dutch architect Fred Greven. After several years of construction, the He Hua Temple was officially completed in September 2000. On September 15 of the same year, Queen Beatrix of the Netherlands attended the opening ceremony.

== Architecture ==
The leaders of the Fo Guang Shan dismissed the first temple design by architect Fred Greven as too small with incorrect measurements. For the second design he applied the Buddhist sacred measurement unit of 32 centimeters and everything fell in place. The temple is dedicated to the meeting between Chinese and Dutch culture. It symbolizes a blossoming lotus flower for Buddhism in the Netherlands. The granite outdoor stairs and balustrades were made in China.

The temple has four floors:

- Floor (-1) has a large dining hall and exhibition space. A free vegetarian meal is served after each ceremony.
- Floor (ground 1) has two rooms for Buddha worship with statues of Kuan Yin (Guanyin), Wei Tuo (Skanda) and Qie-Lan (Guan Yu).
- Floor (2) are private quarters.
- Floor (3) has a library.

The facades of the two side-buildings transition to typical Dutch architecture of the Zeedijk. The roof was originally covered with imported Taiwanese roof tiles. However, these were incompatible with Dutch weather. They were replaced by custom yellow glazed Romanesque tiles with replica fittings and prayer statues. These were made by the Dutch ceramics company Traditec.

== Events ==
There are events during traditional Chinese festivals and important Buddhist holidays. On Vesak Day, during full moon in May, a large number of Chinese Dutch and other Buddhists come to burn incense to worship Buddha, and the many bodhisattvas. During the procession, a statue of Siddhartha Gautama is carried from the temple to the Nieuwmarkt.

== Gallery ==
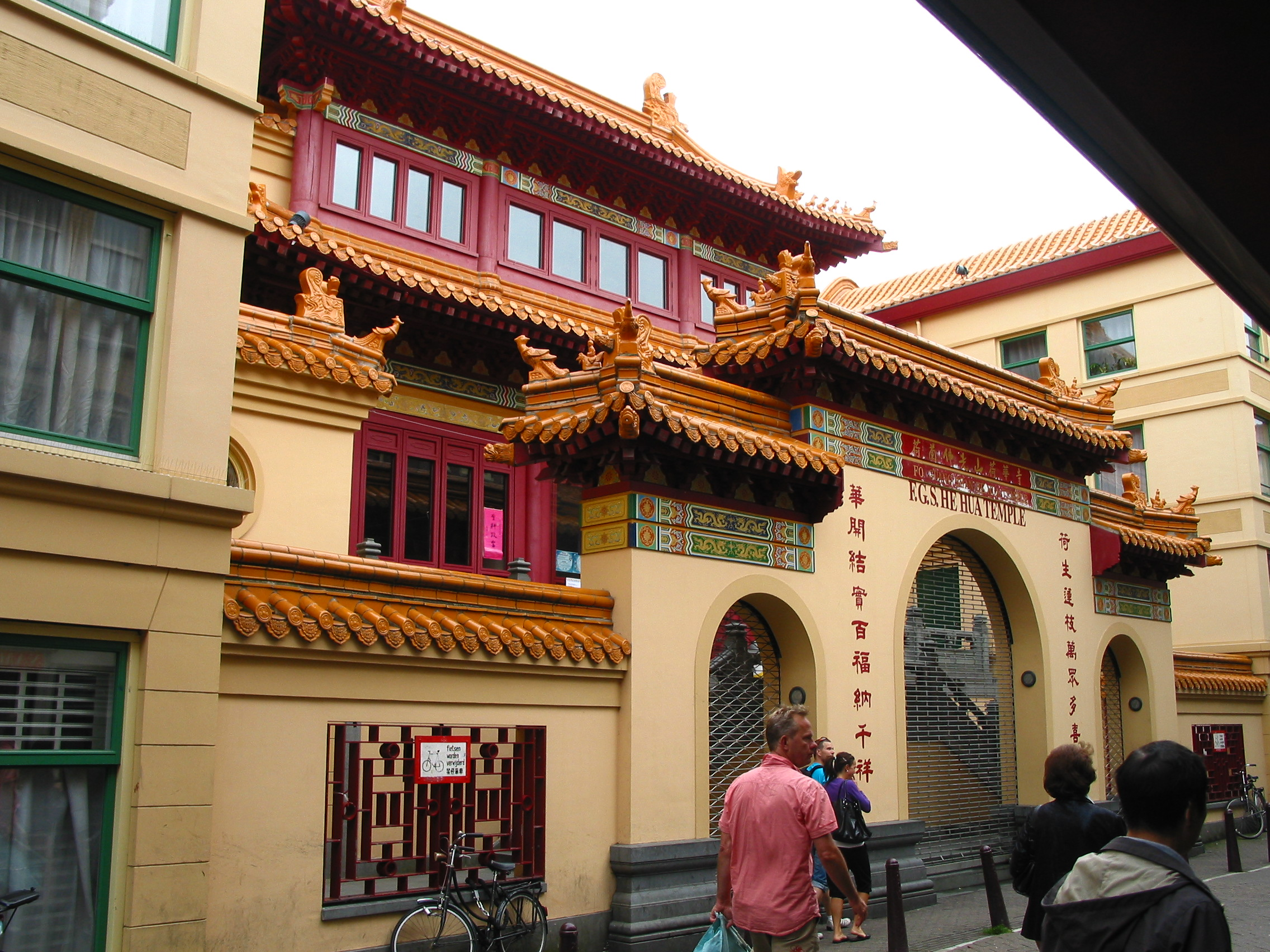
He Hua temple

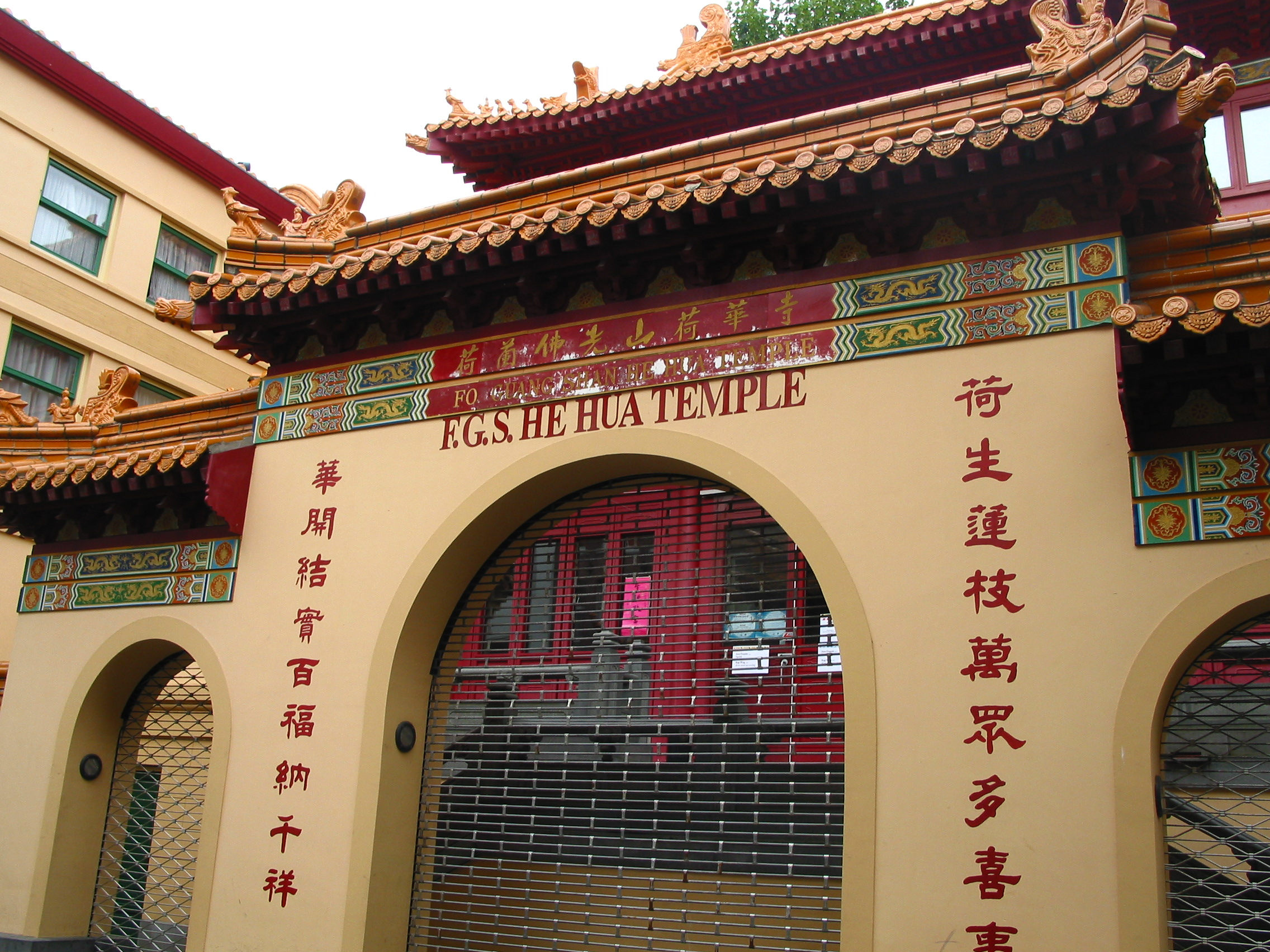
Temple during non-opening hours with closed bars

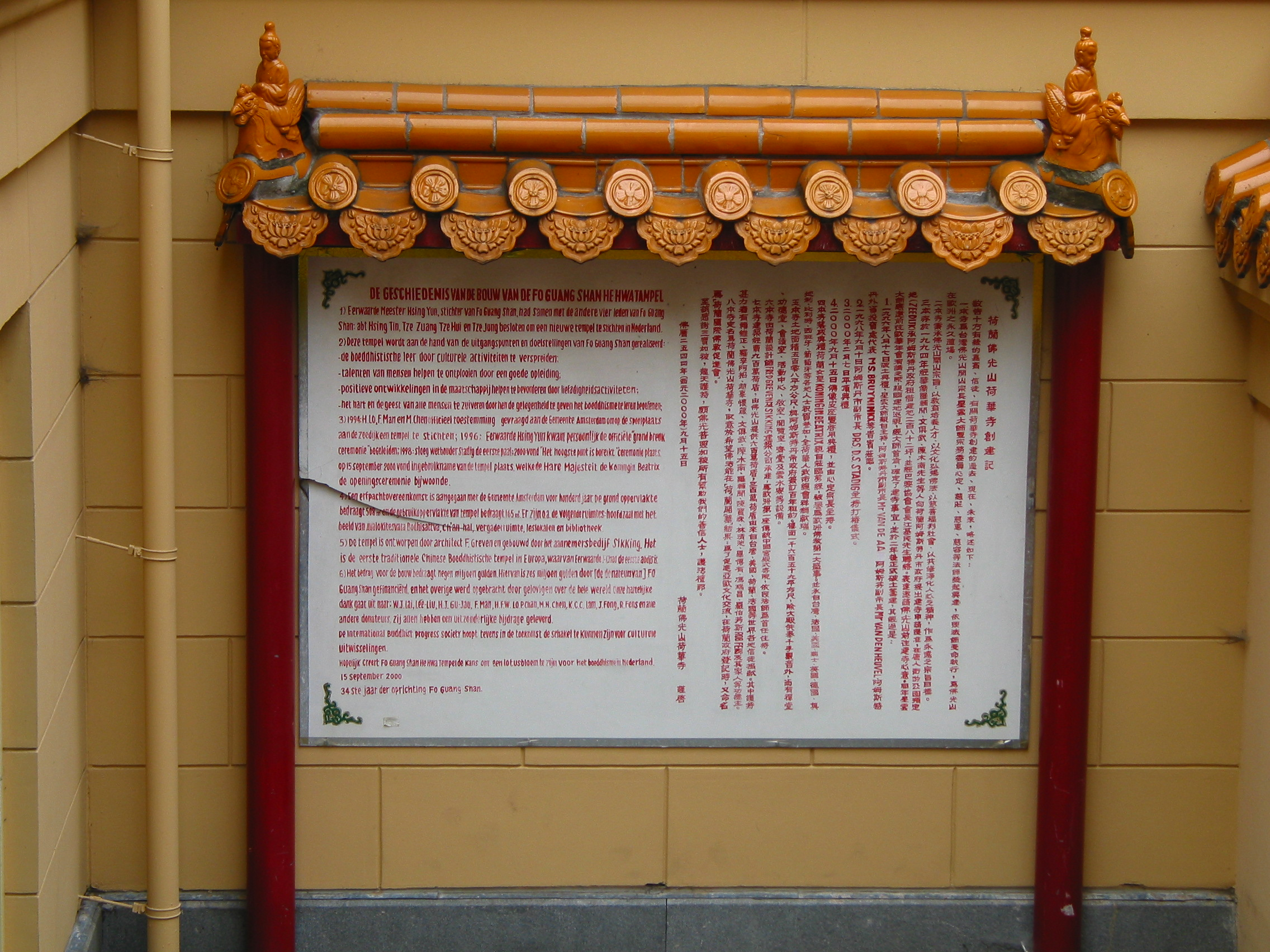
Handwritten information board

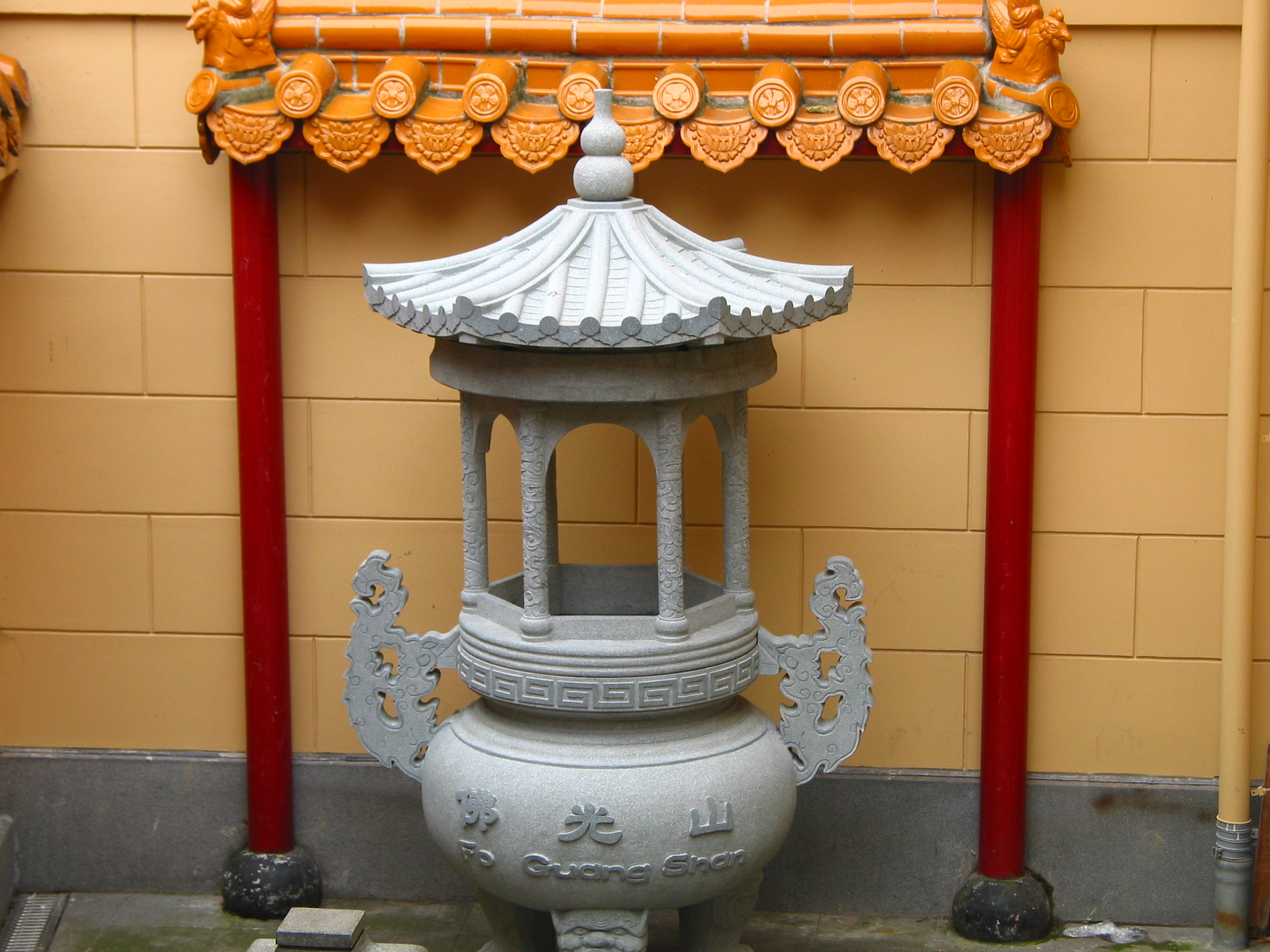
Incense pot

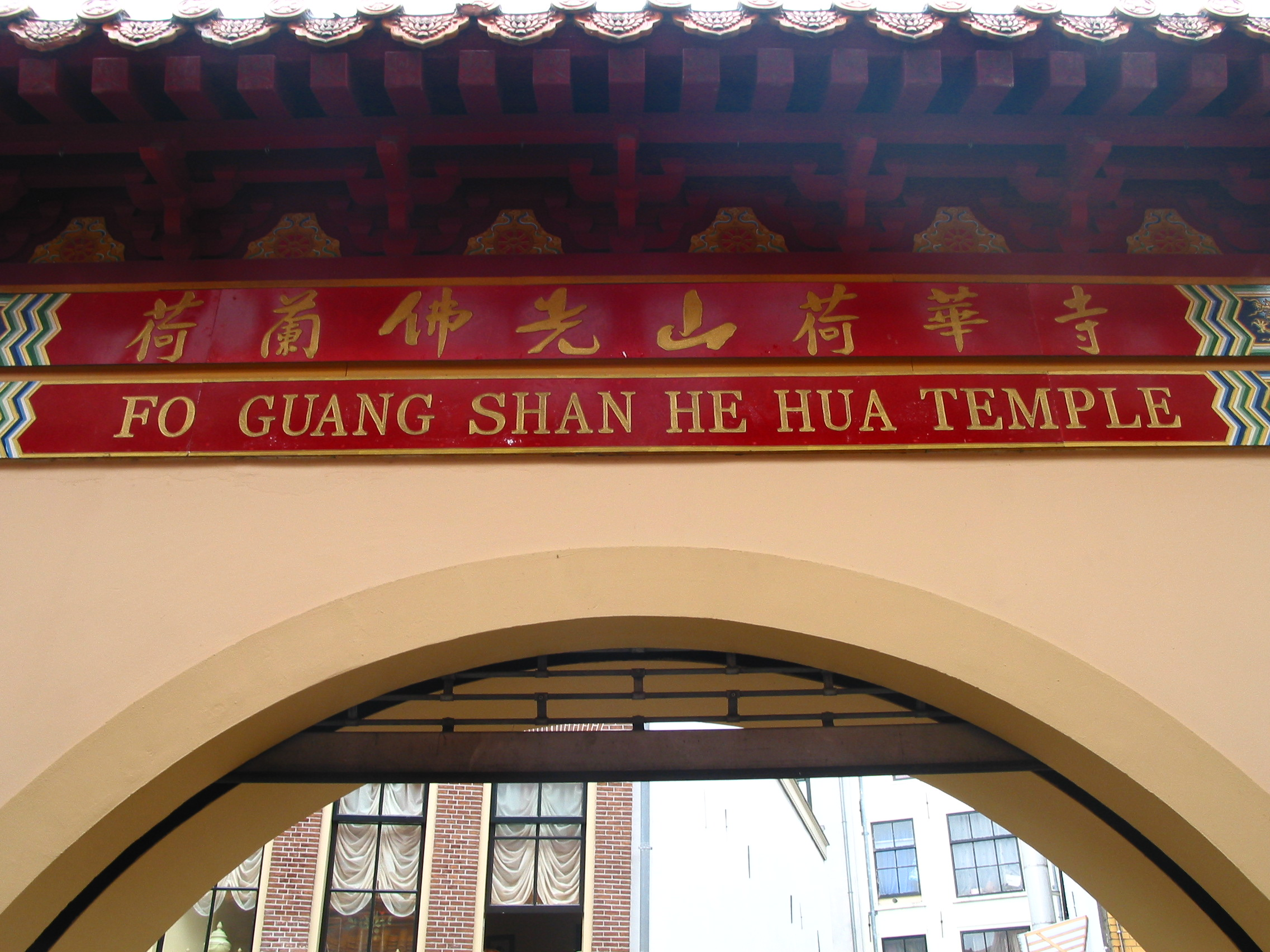
Gate seen from Kuan Yin Shrine

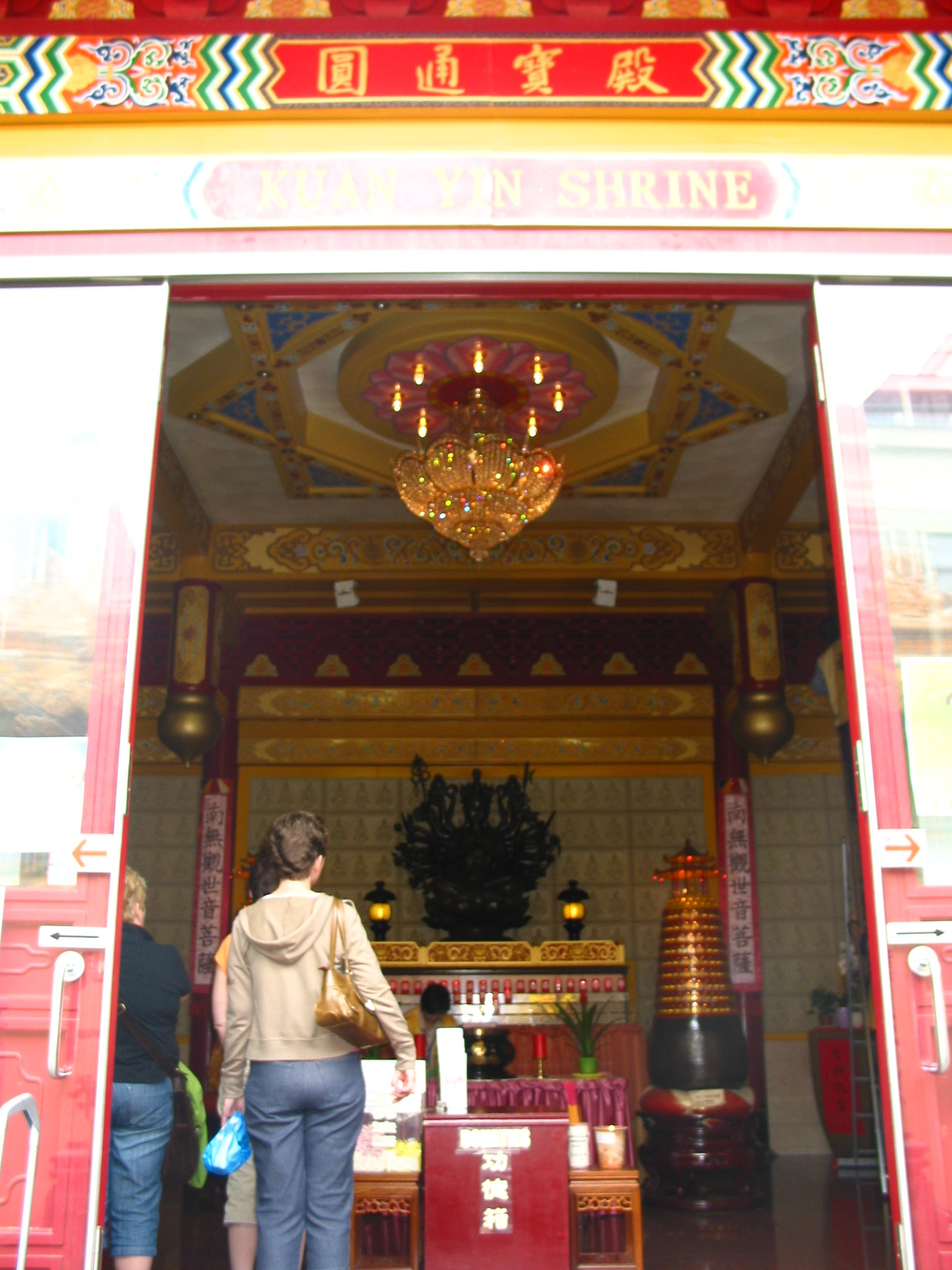
Kuan Yin Shrine

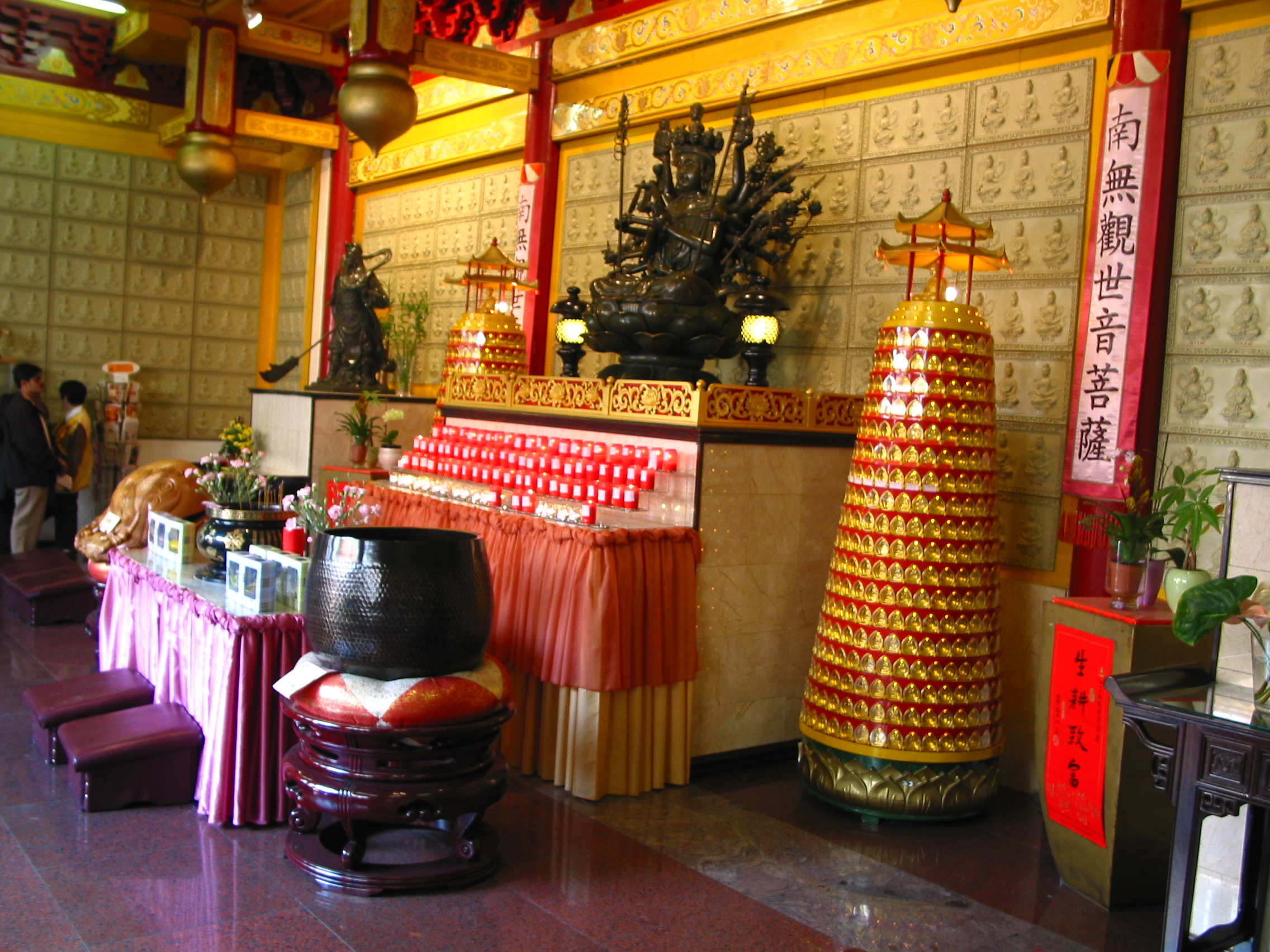
Kuan Yin Shrine

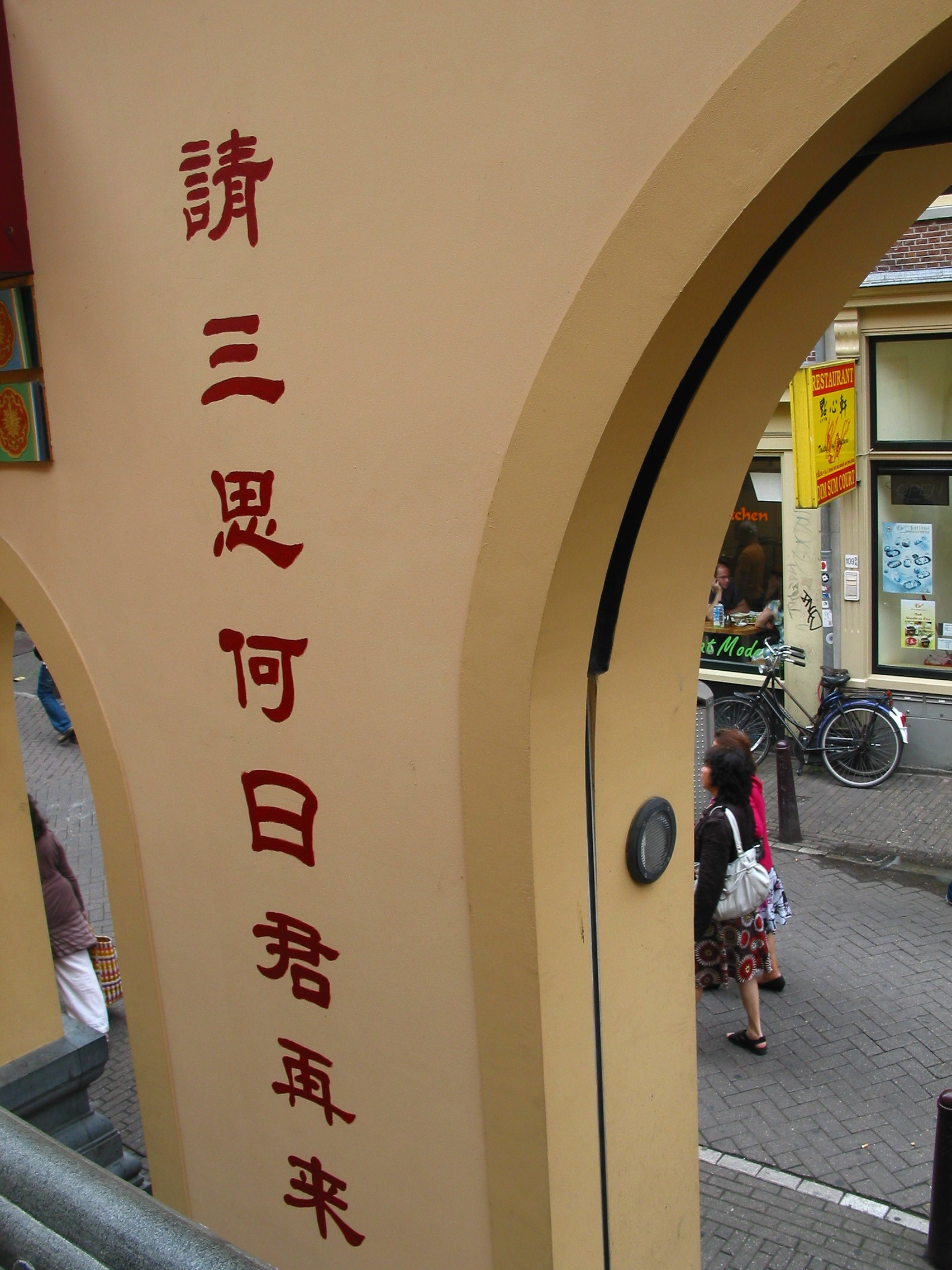
Left duilian on the gate seen from the Kuan Yin Shrine

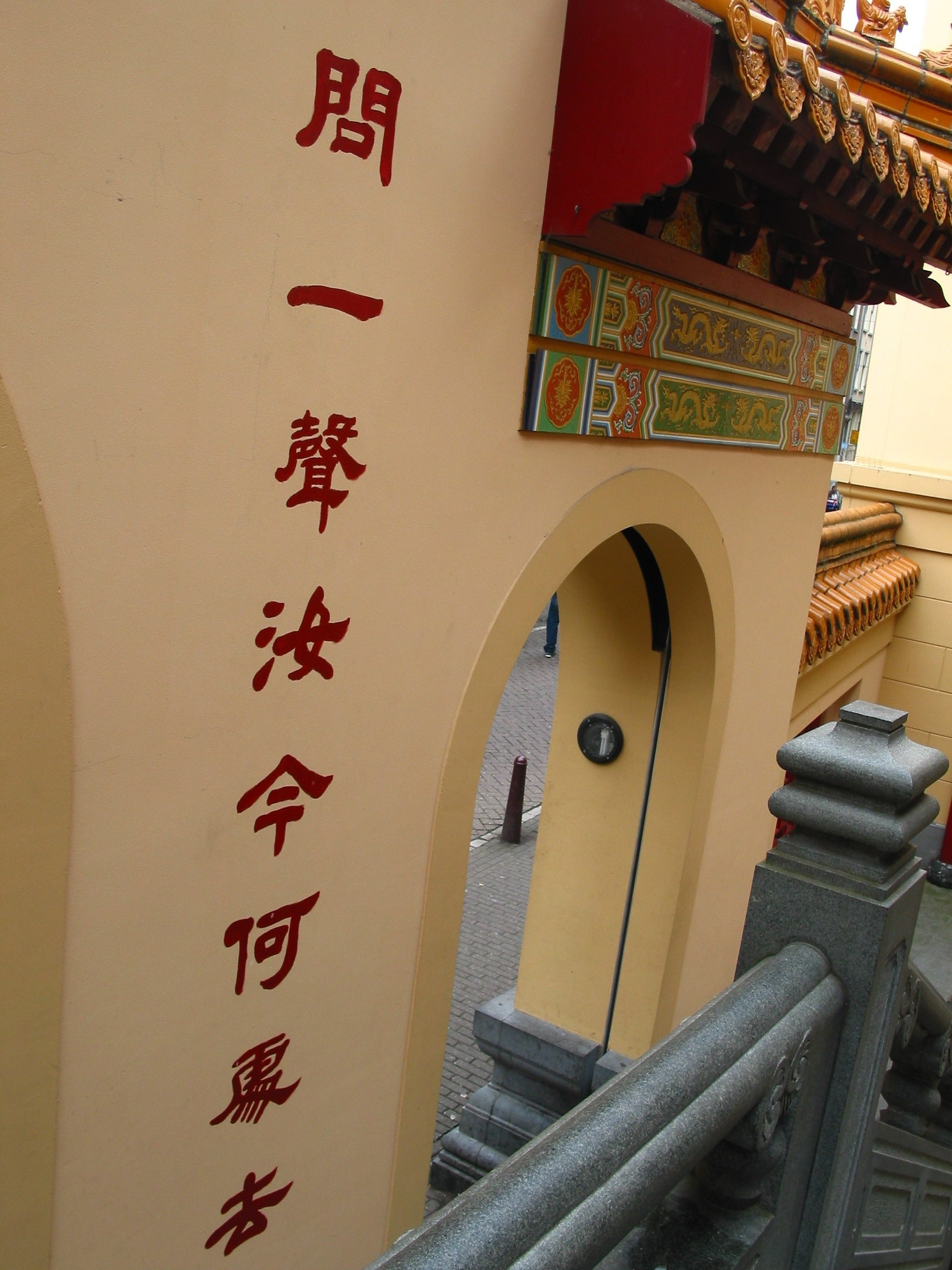
Right duilian on the gate seen from the Kuan Yin Shrine

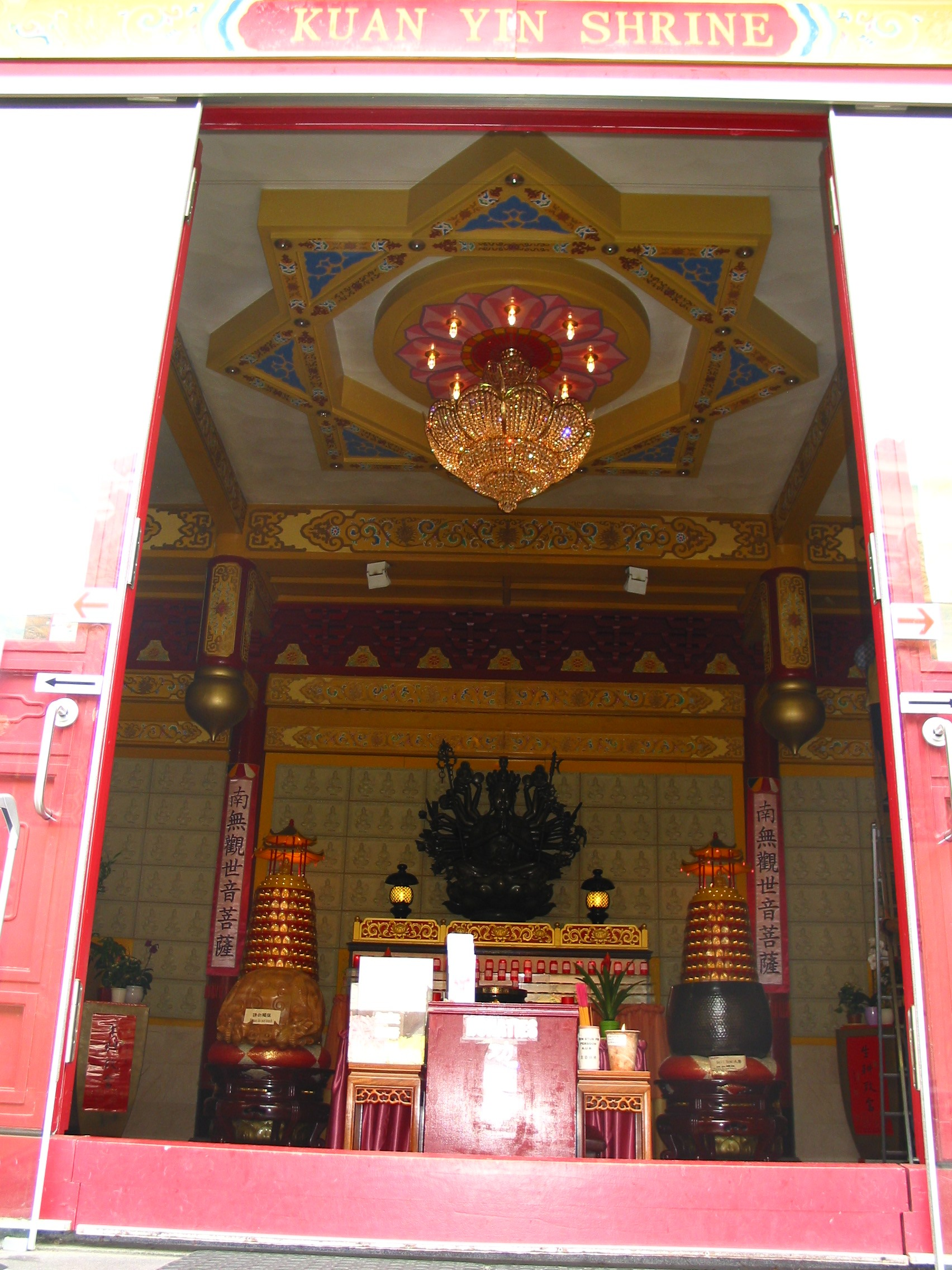
Kuan Yin Shrine (Guanyin)

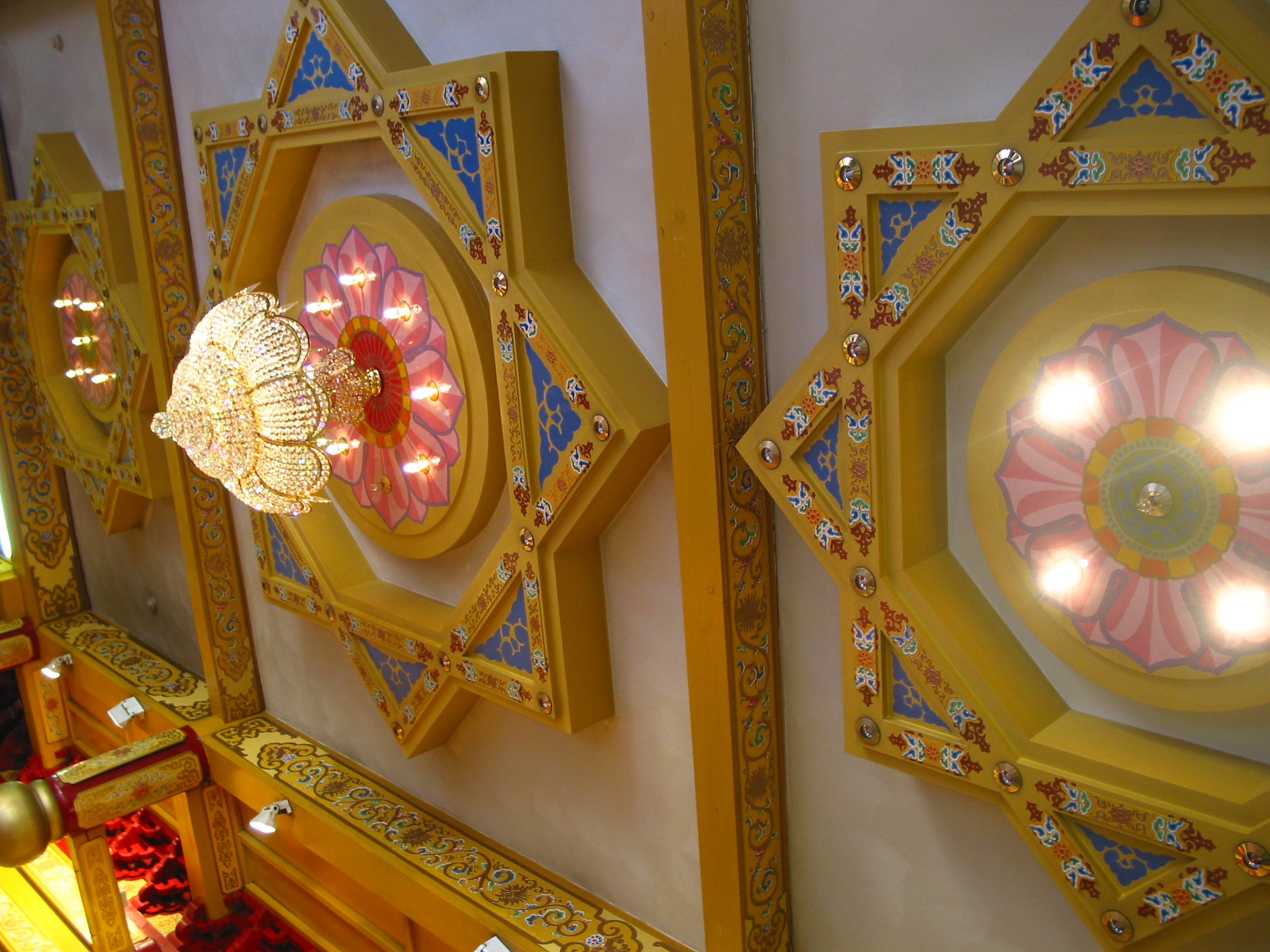
Roof of the temple

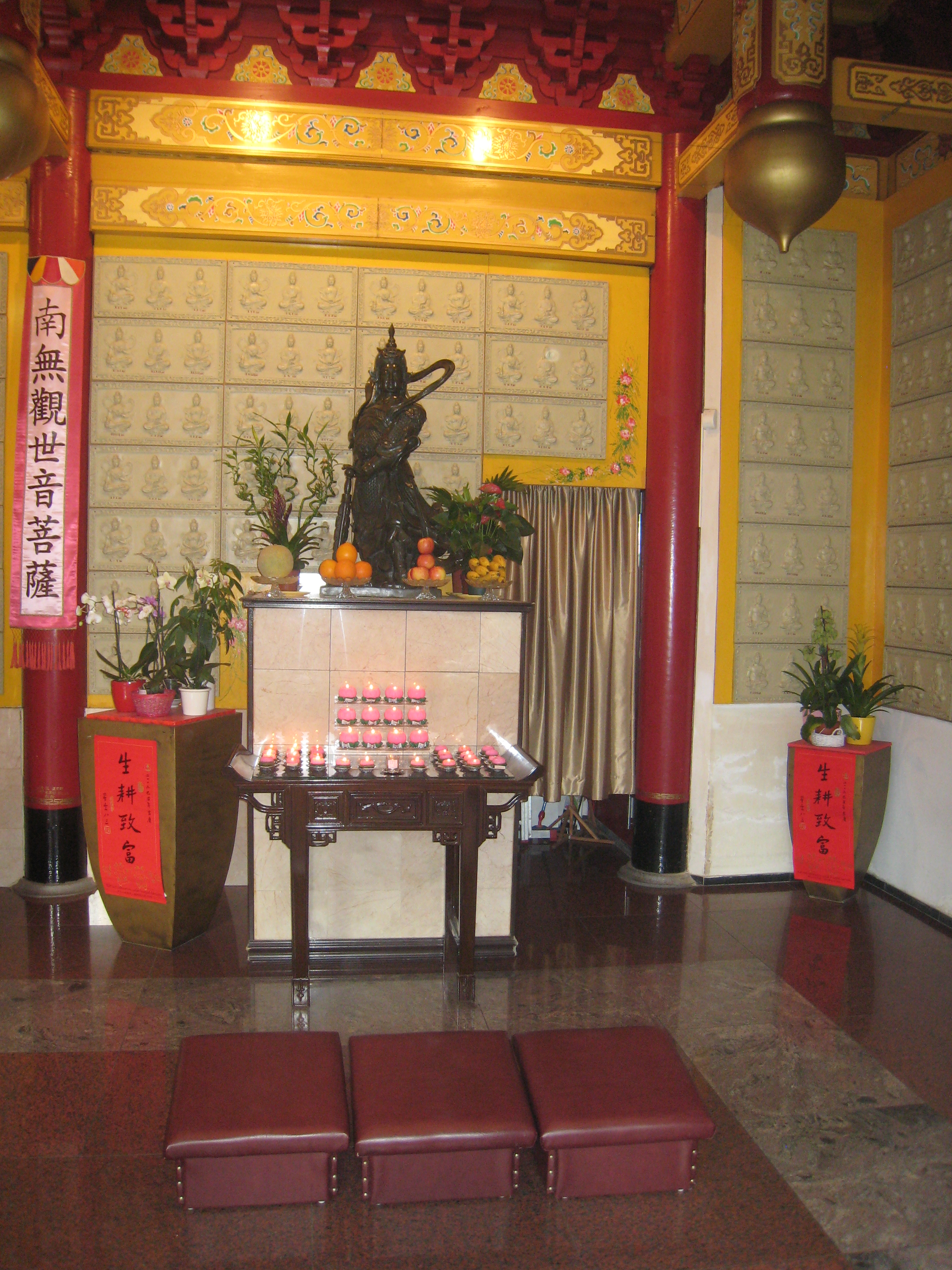
Altar of Skanda

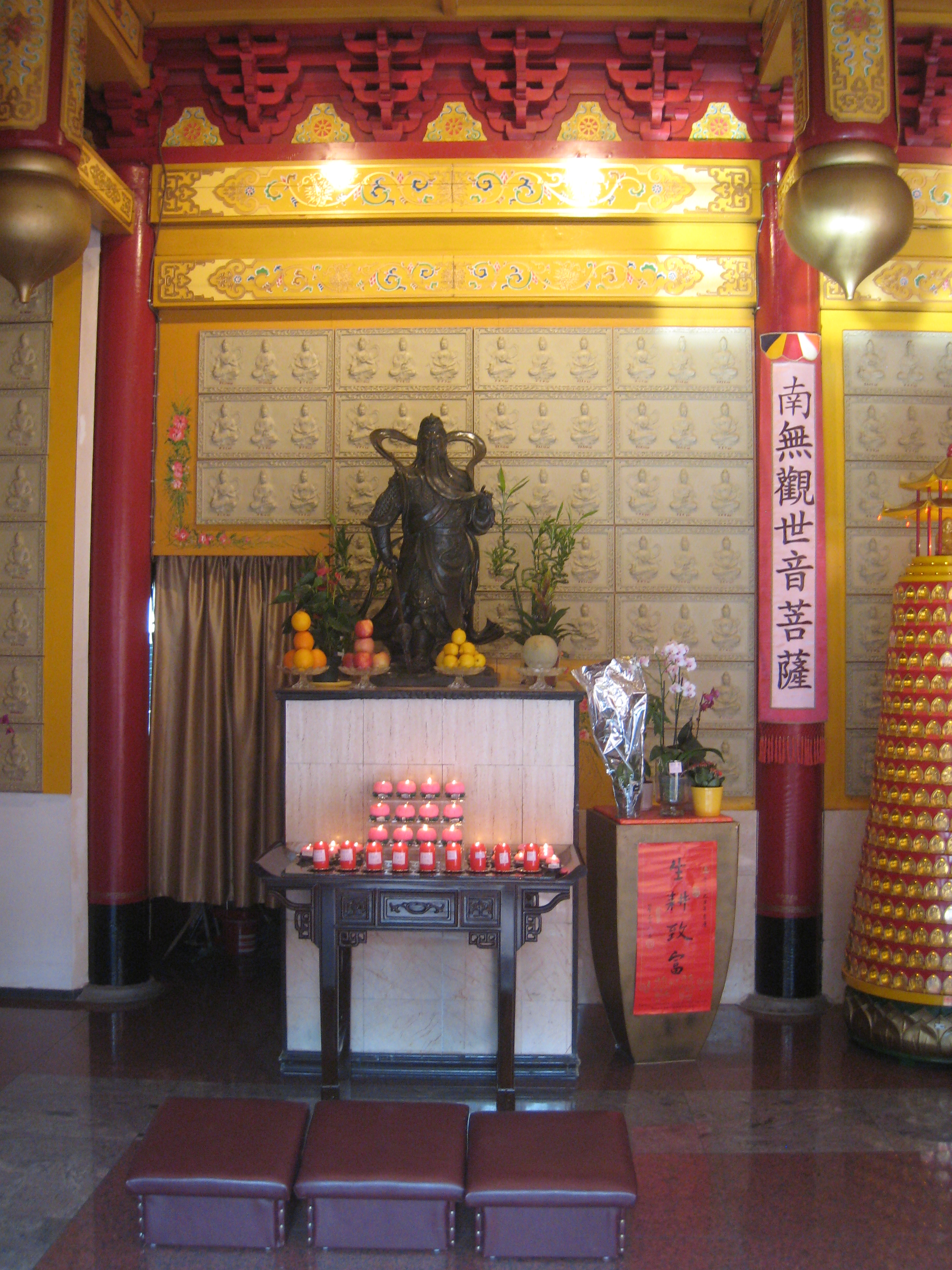
Altar of Guan Yu

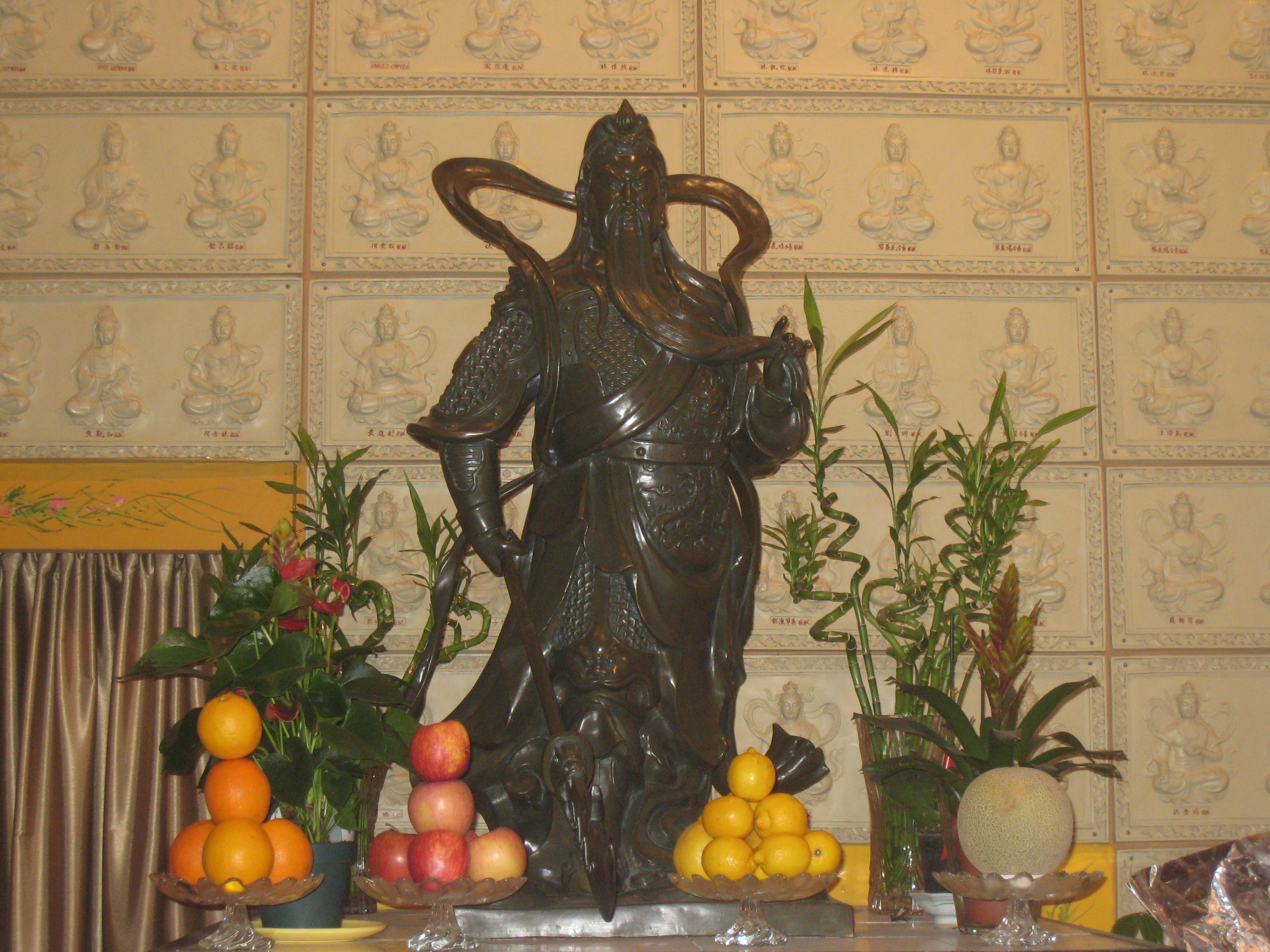
Guan Yu

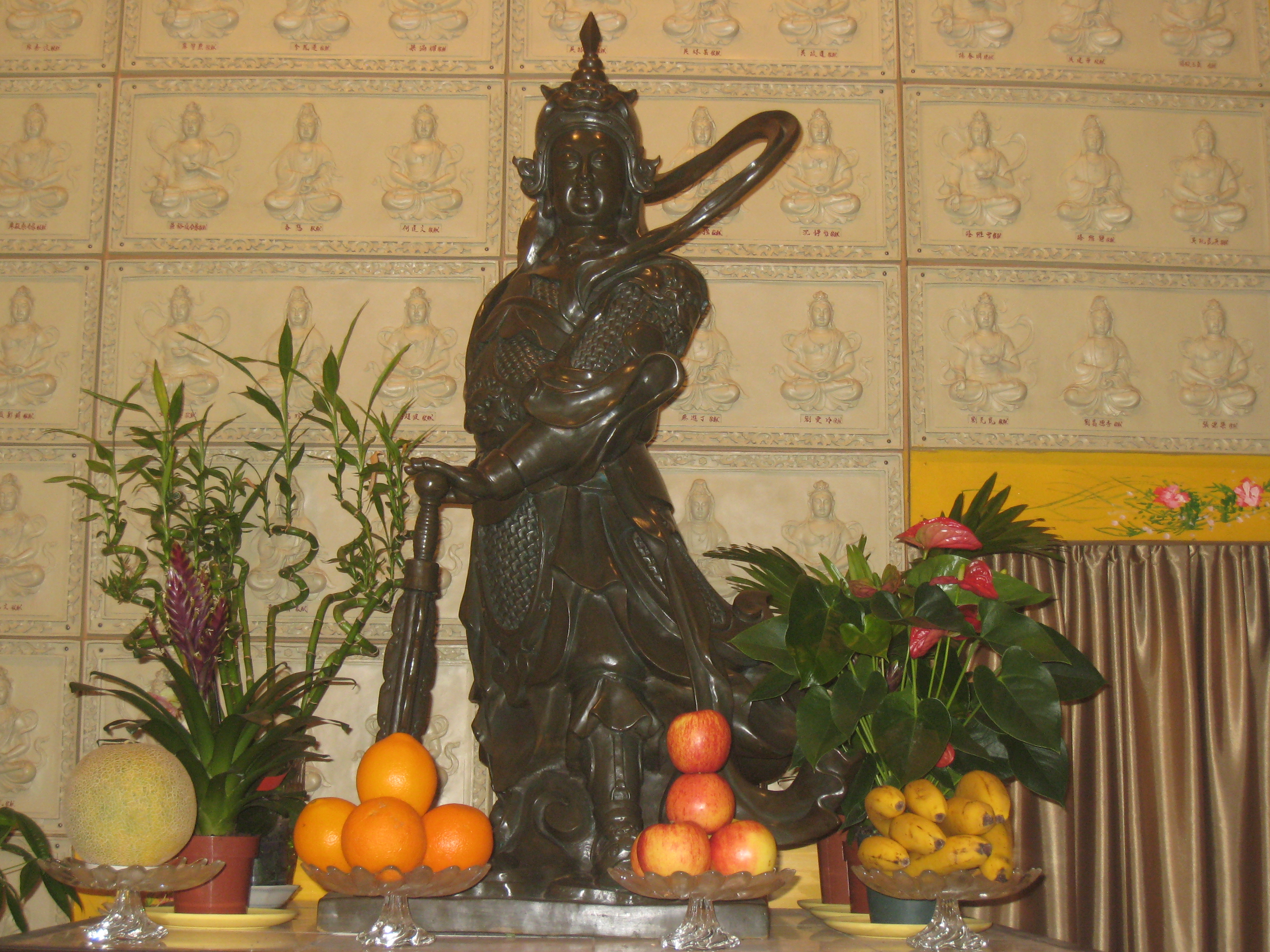
Skanda

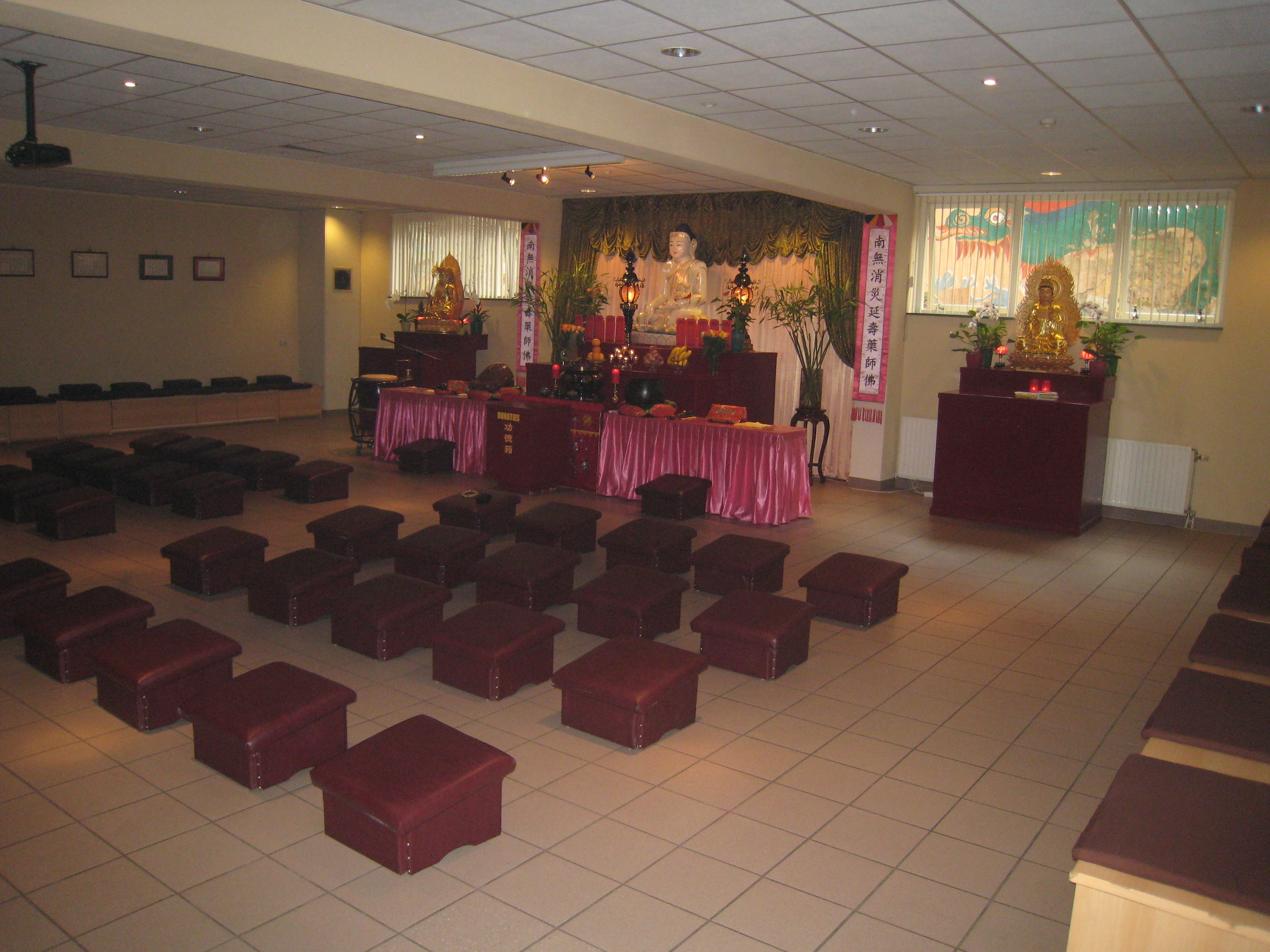
Jaden Buddha hall

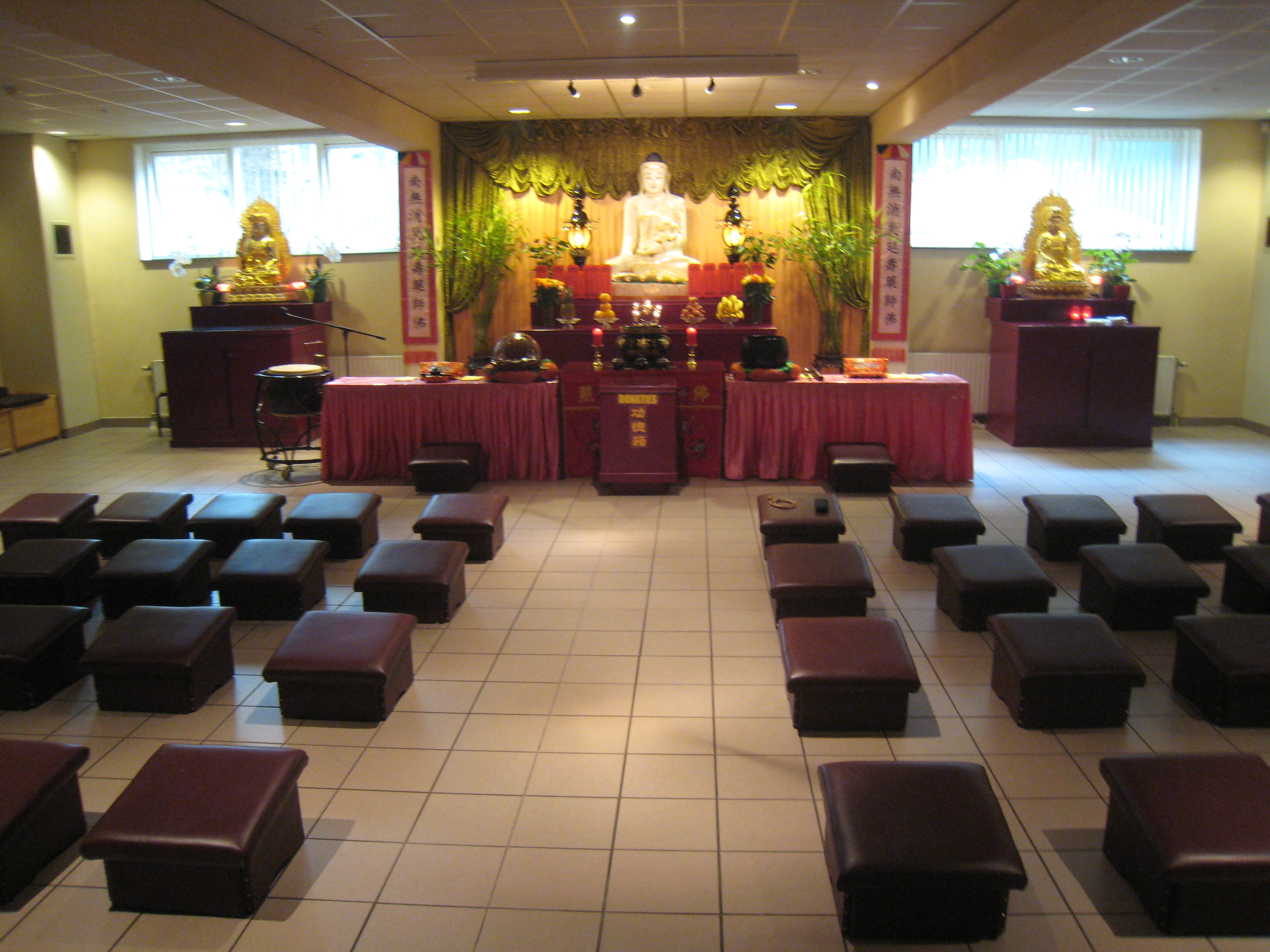
Altar of Siddhartha Gautama
