= Zeedijk =

Street in the old centre of Amsterdam

Coordinates: 52°22′26.64″N 4°54′1.50″E

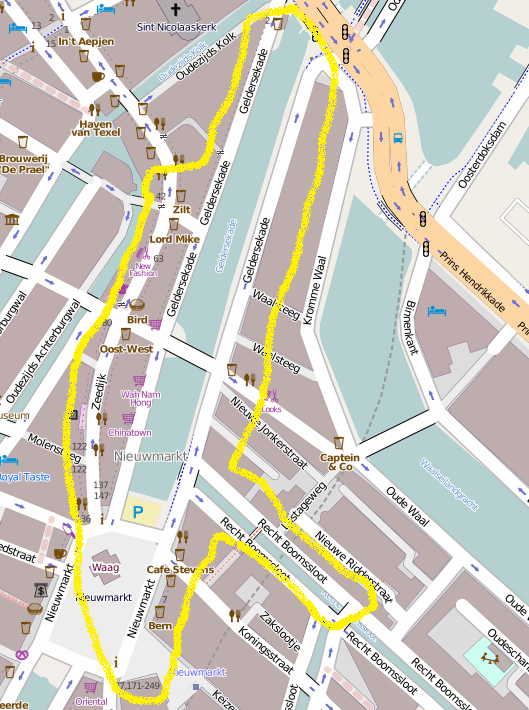
- Traditional Chinese: 善德街
- Simplified Chinese: 善德街
Transcriptions
Standard Mandarin
- Hanyu Pinyin: shàndé jiē
Yue: Cantonese
- Yale Romanization: sin^{6} dak^{1} gaai^{1}

Zeedijk (English: "Sea dike") is a street in the old centre of Amsterdam. The street is the northern and eastern boundary of De Wallen red-light district and runs between Prins Hendrikkade and Nieuwmarkt. Historically an area riddled with crime and drug addicts, the area went through a revitalization and is now the main street of Amsterdam's Chinatown, where locals come to eat at Vietnamese, Thai and Chinese restaurants. The Zeedijk neighbourhood is also known as the Nautical Quarter (Dutch: Nautisch Kwartier) because of its past as a sailors' neighbourhood.

== History ==
The zeedijk was constructed as seawall or dike to protect Amsterdam from the water of the IJ, which was in open connection with the Zuiderzee until 1872. The street's curvature is a noticeable remnant of its adherence to the contours of the old dike. Halfway along the dike is the former Sint Anthoniespoort, the old city gate now called the Waag. Beyond the gate running south-east, the dike continued as Sint Antoniesdijk (now Sint Antoniesbreestraat).

The neighbourhood is one of the oldest parts of Amsterdam. In 1544, Zeedijk was the first street to have permanent street lights installed. Until the 17th century, the curve of the promenade was one of the most respectable places where one could live. After the construction of the luxurious Herengracht, the wealthy merchants moved out of the area and it became a centre of nightlife for passing sailors. The old bars and the shops for ship supplies are still a reminder of this.

== Chinatown ==
Zeedijk is the heart of Chinatown, the Chinese neighbourhood of Amsterdam. There are many tokos and restaurants there, such as Nam Kee, described in the novel De Oesters van Nam Kee by Kees van Beijnum and the movie based on the book. The text on the street signs in the Zeedijk area and Nieuwmarkt are both in Dutch as well as in Chinese. The neighborhood is the location of the He Hua Temple, a Buddhist temple which is open to the public. This is the second oldest Chinatown in Europe after the Chinatown in London.

== Culture ==
Jazz musician Chet Baker fell to his death at Zeedijk in 1988. A plaque was put up at the site in his memory.

Café 't Mandje on Zeedijk 63 was an early example of a bar where, aside from prostitutes, pimps and sailors, gays and lesbians were also welcome. Opened in 1927, owner Bet van Beeren soon became an icon within Amsterdam's LGBT community. After her death in 1967, her sister Greet continued the café until 1983. It was reopened in 2008 by relatives. Besides Café 't Mandje, there were other gay bars in Zeedijk as well. Around the year 2000, four gay bars (De Barderij, The Queen's Head, De Engel van Amsterdam, and De Engel Next Door) opened in close proximity to each other along the bend at the north-east end of Zeedijk, making this area one of Amsterdam's hotspots of gay nightlife.

Once a year, in August, the Hartjesdag takes place on the Zeedijk, a festival featuring a parade of costumed participants.

== Gallery ==
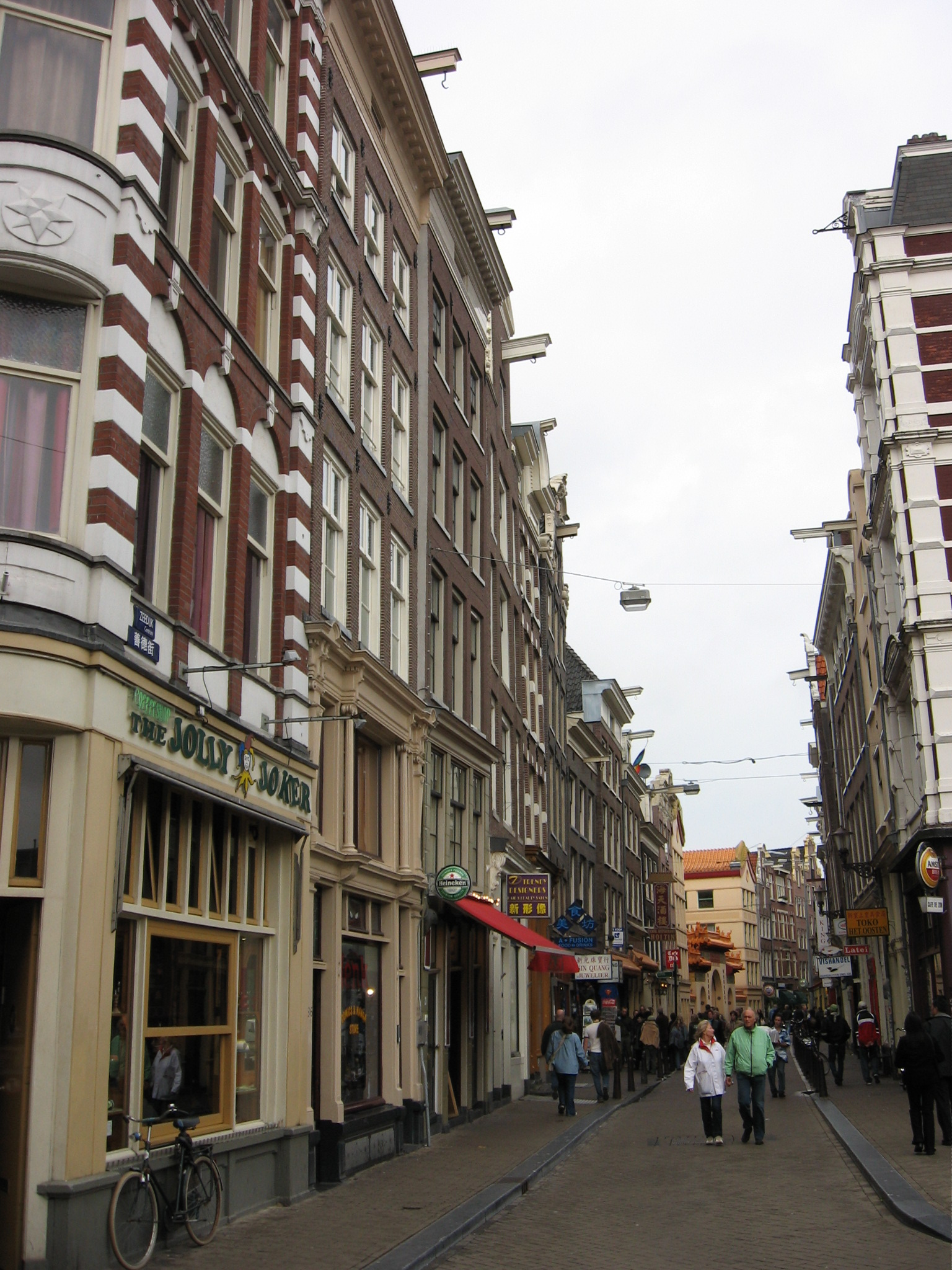
Zeedijk in Amsterdam

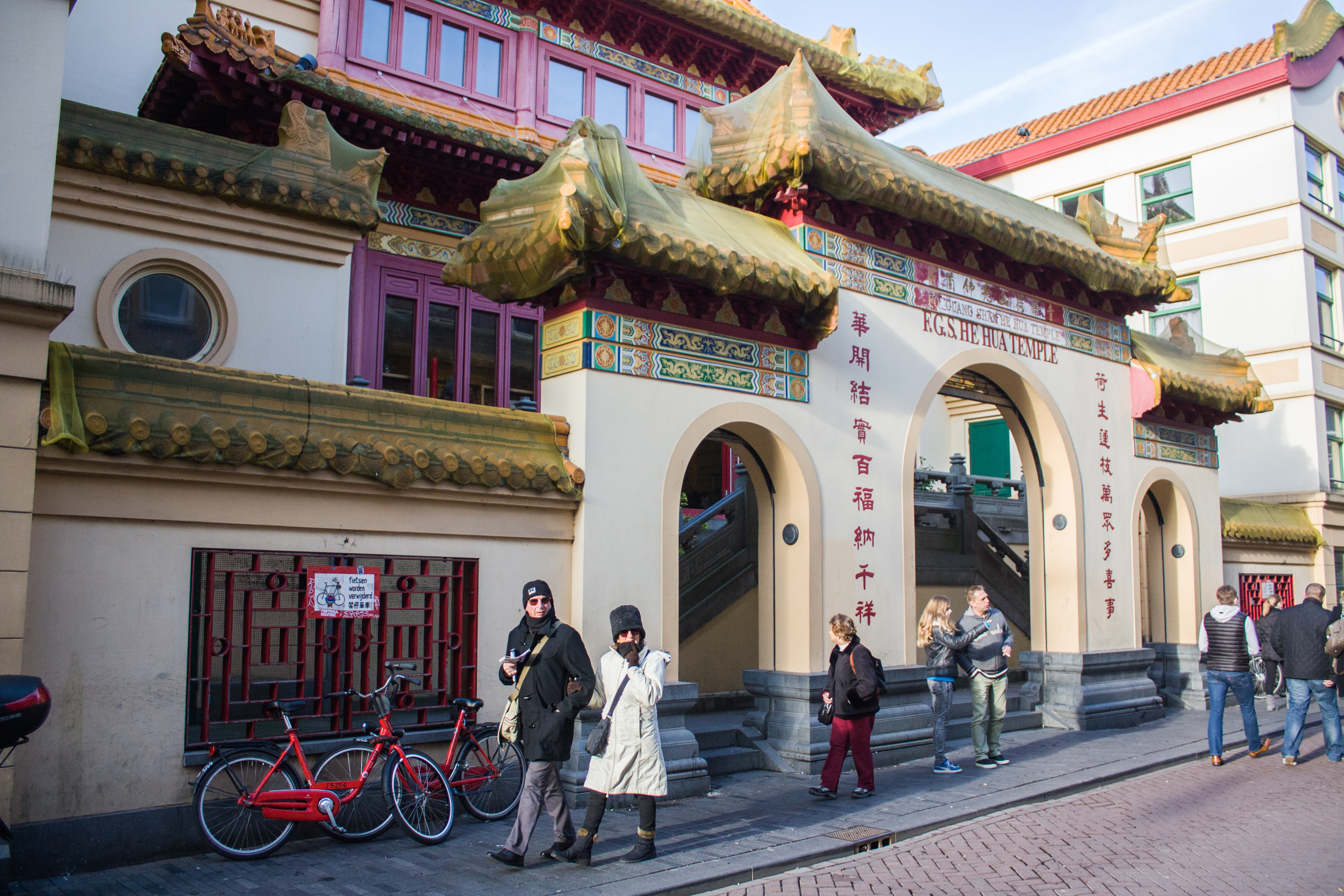
He Hua Temple

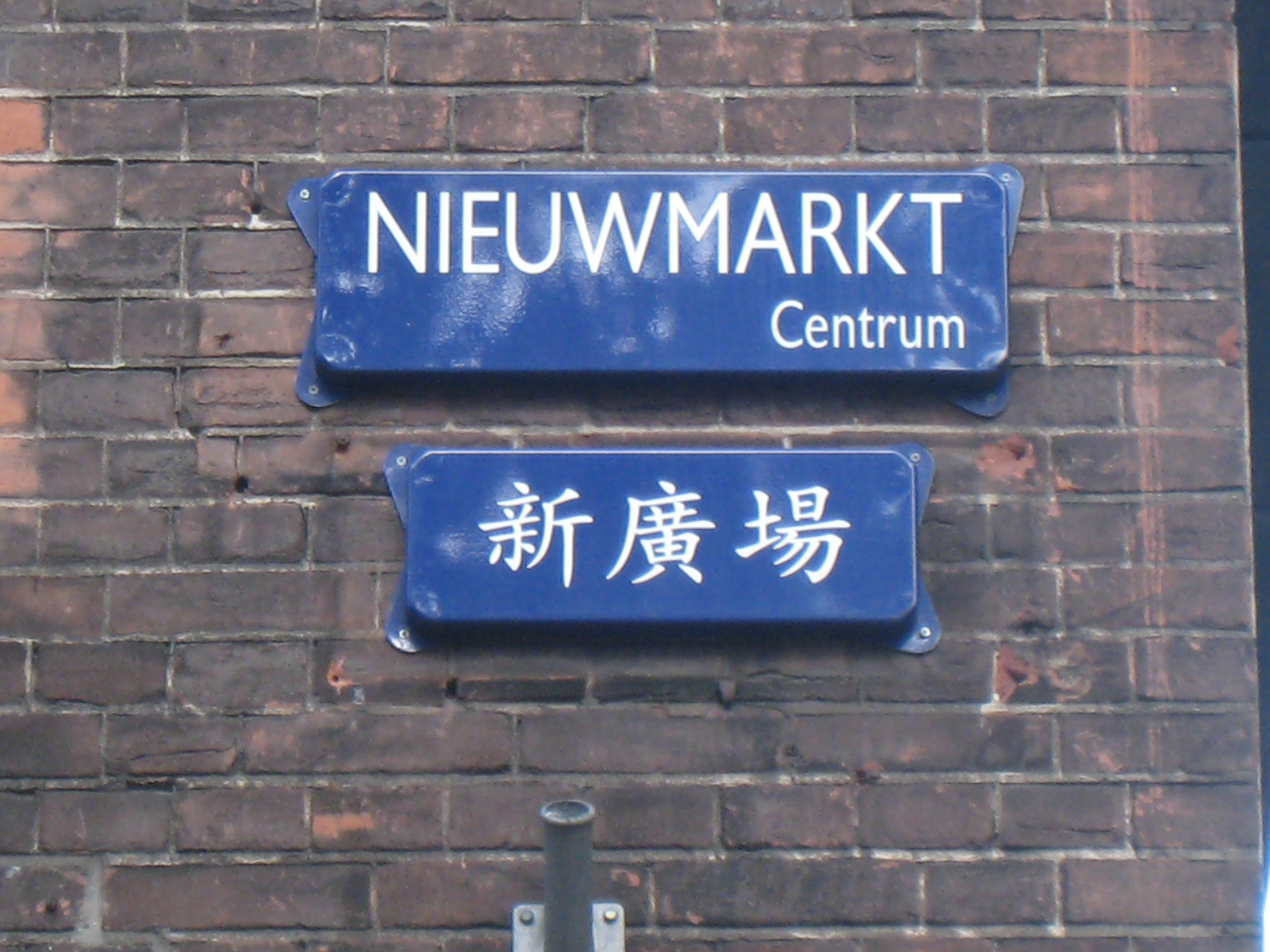
The Chinatown area has bilingual street signs

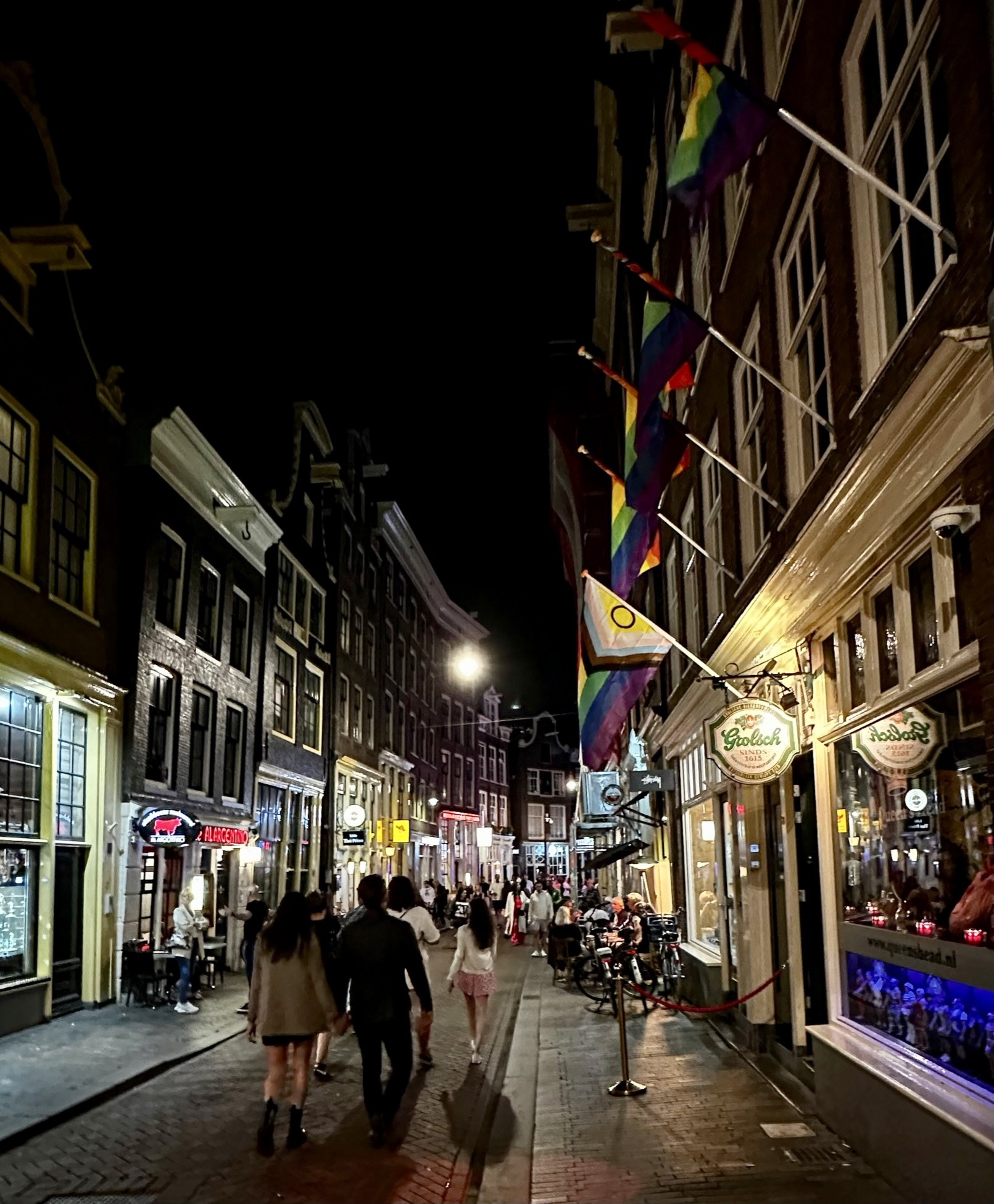
Zeedijk at night

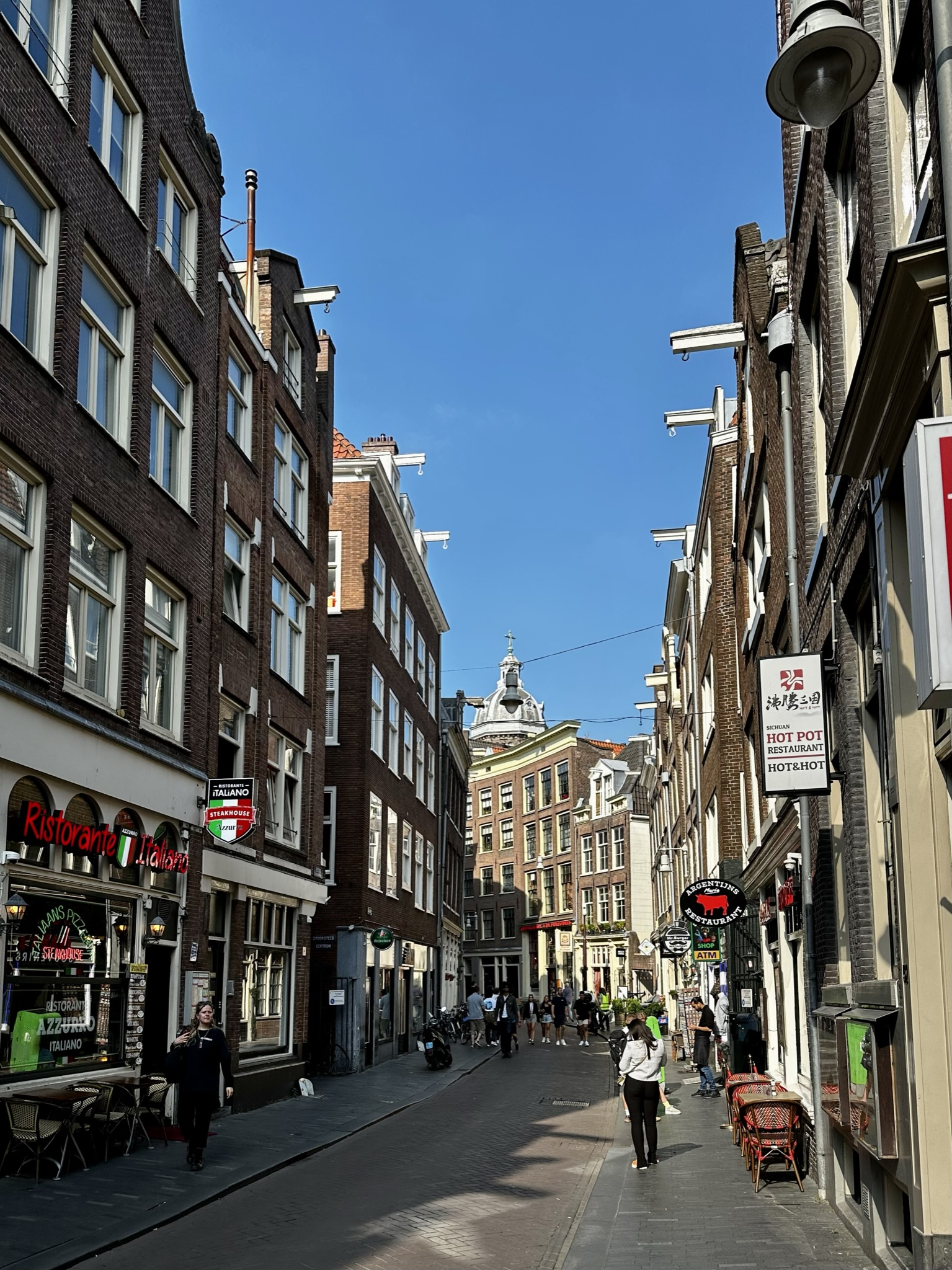
Zeedijk in 2023
