= Hartjesdag =

Holiday in the Netherlands

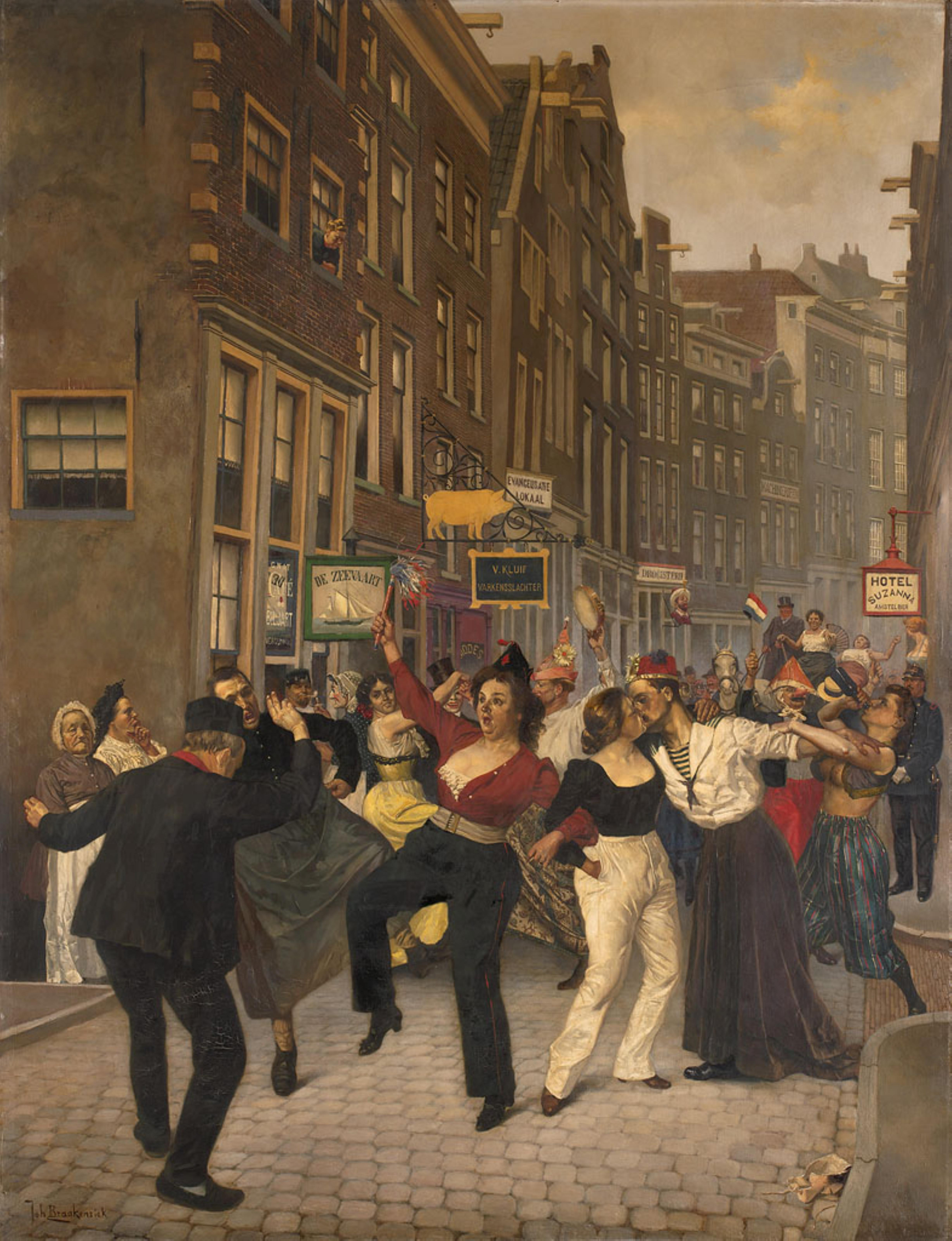
Painting by Johan Braakensiek (1858-1940) of Hartjesdag, from the collection of the Amsterdam Museum.

Originally Hartjesdag (Day of Hearts) was a festival celebrated on the third Monday in August in the Dutch areas of Haarlem and Bloemendaal and in various parts of Amsterdam, particularly around the Haarlemmerplein, in the Jordaan, and in the Dapperbuurt. On Hartjesdag fires were kindled and children collected money. Later it developed itself into a type of cross-dressing carnival, where men dressed as women, and women dressed as men. A typical scene was captured in the oil painting entitled Hartjesdag, by the artist Johan Braakensiek in 1926.

== Origin and development ==
Where the name Hartjesdag comes from is not clear. Probably it has arisen in the Middle Ages. It is suspected that the name is a bastardisation of 'hertjesdag' (Deer Day). This was a festival where in the forests around Haarlem deer (herten) hunting could be done by the ordinary people, which was normally reserved for nobility. The deer were then taken to Amsterdam and roasted in the streets.

During the German occupation in 1943 the Hartjesdag became prohibited, and after the war it eventually became obsolete.

In 1997 a local committee in the Zeedijk, Amsterdam, decided to see if they could revive the tradition. Each year since then, the festival has flourished into a two-day event on the 3rd weekend in August.

== Photo-impression ==
Some photos of the Hartjesdag celebration in 2005:

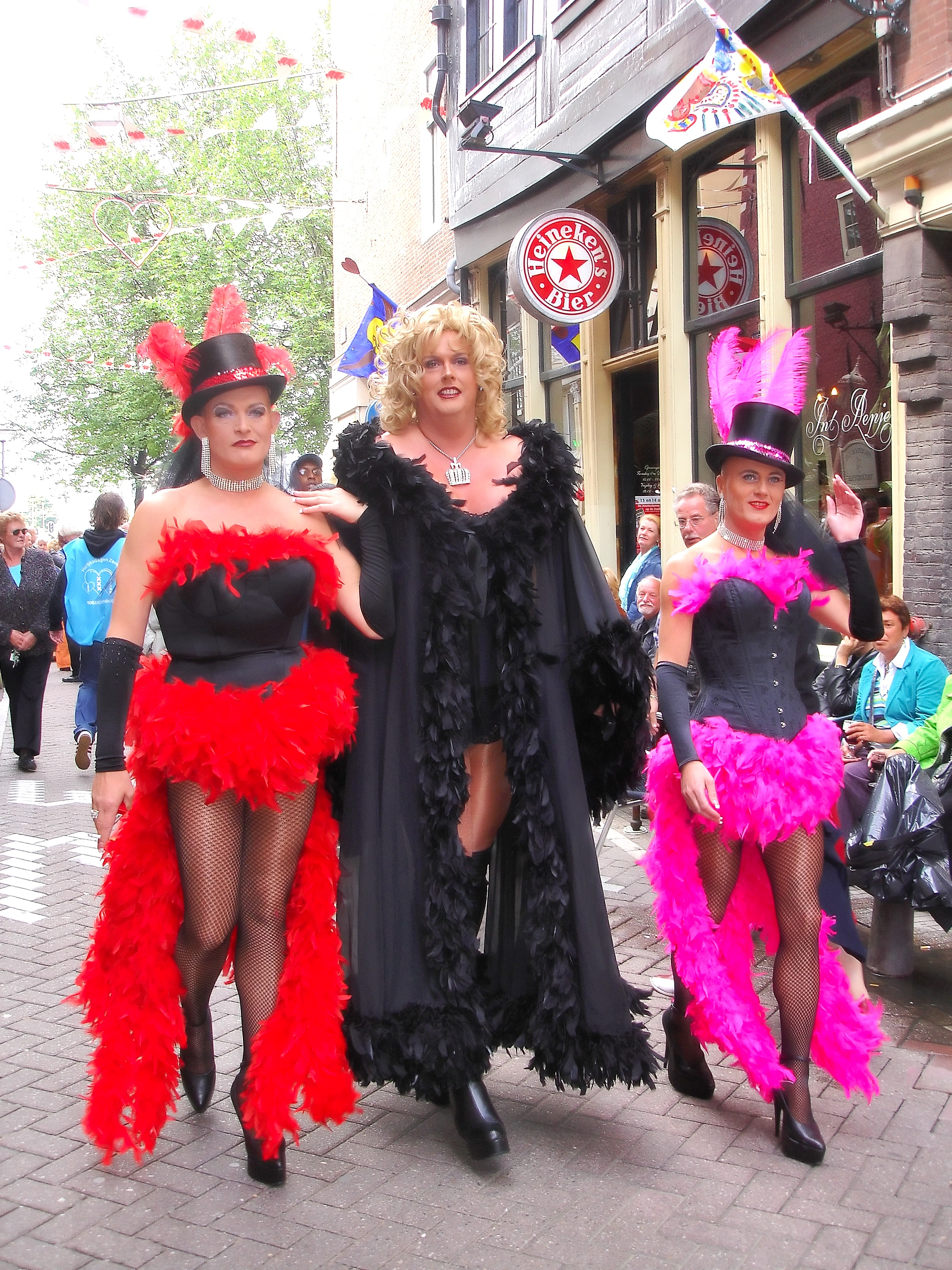

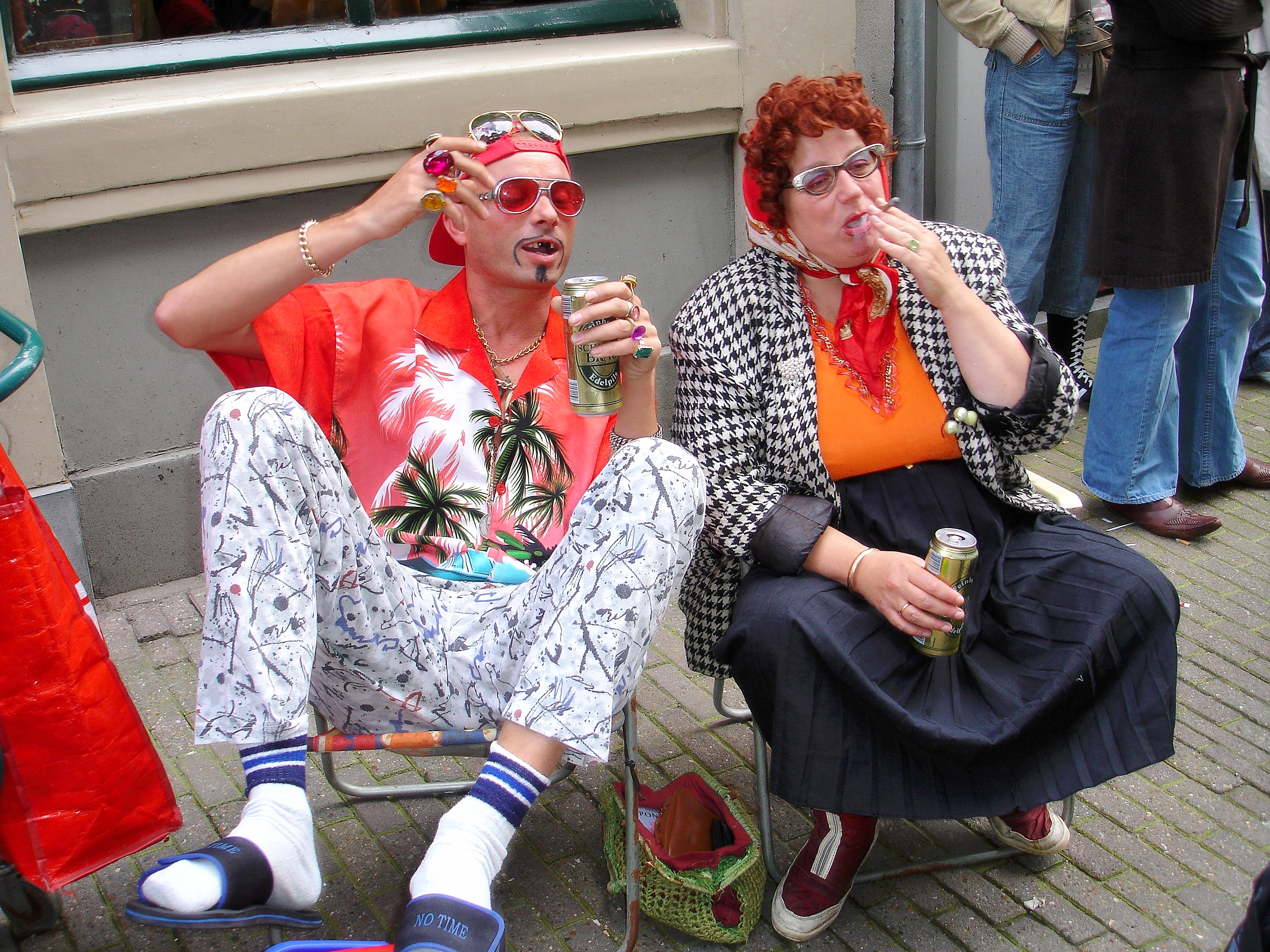

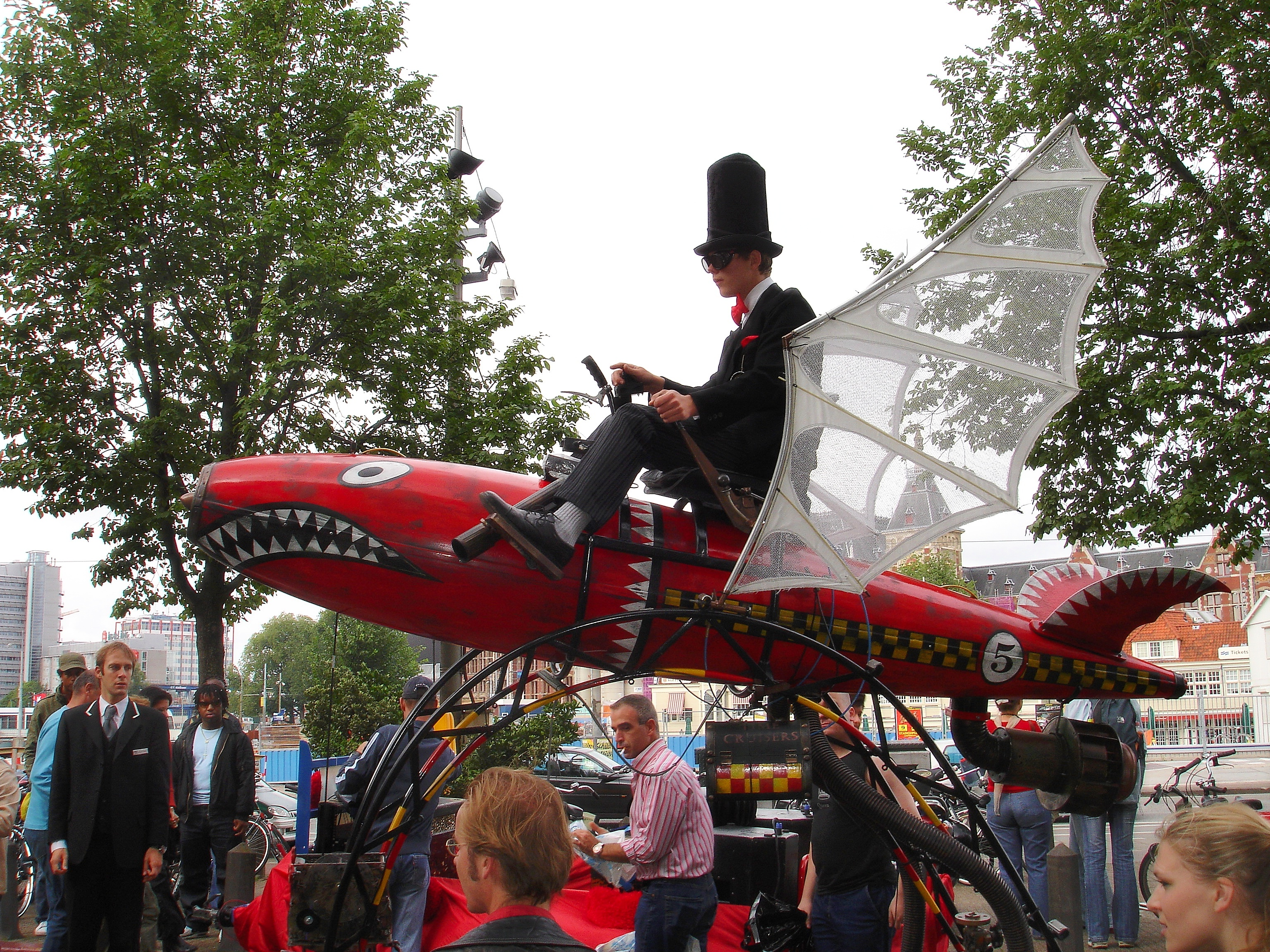

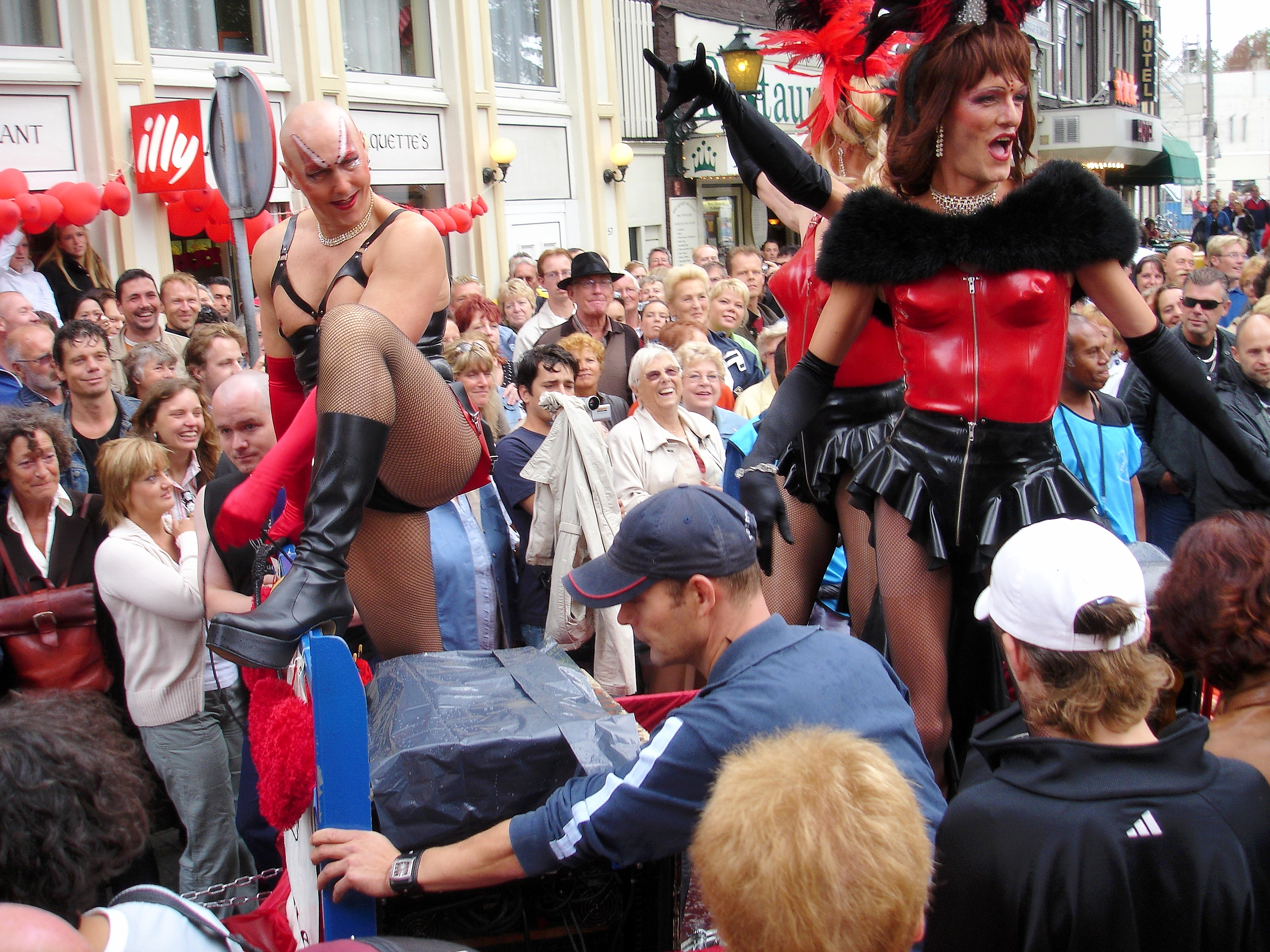

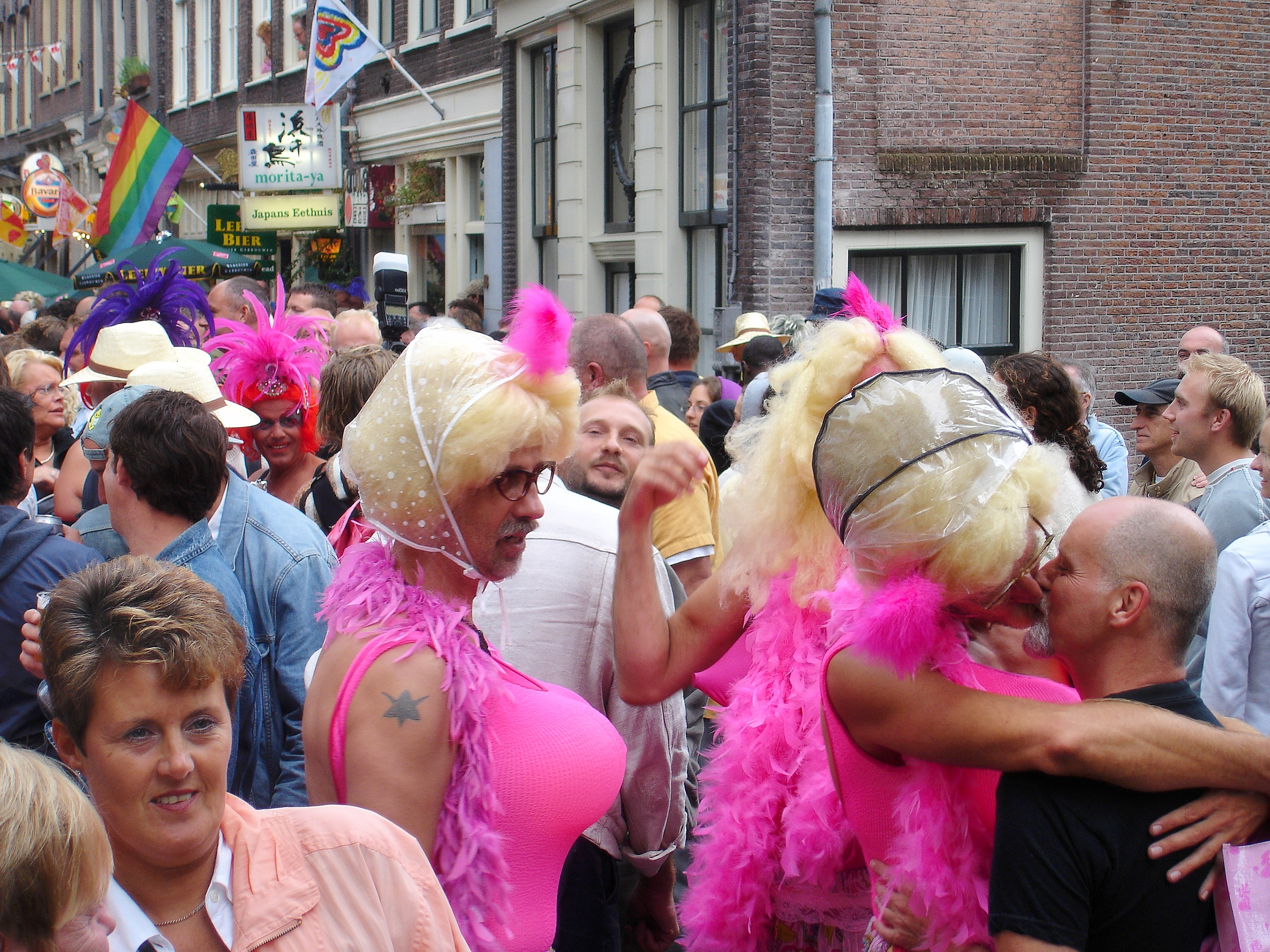

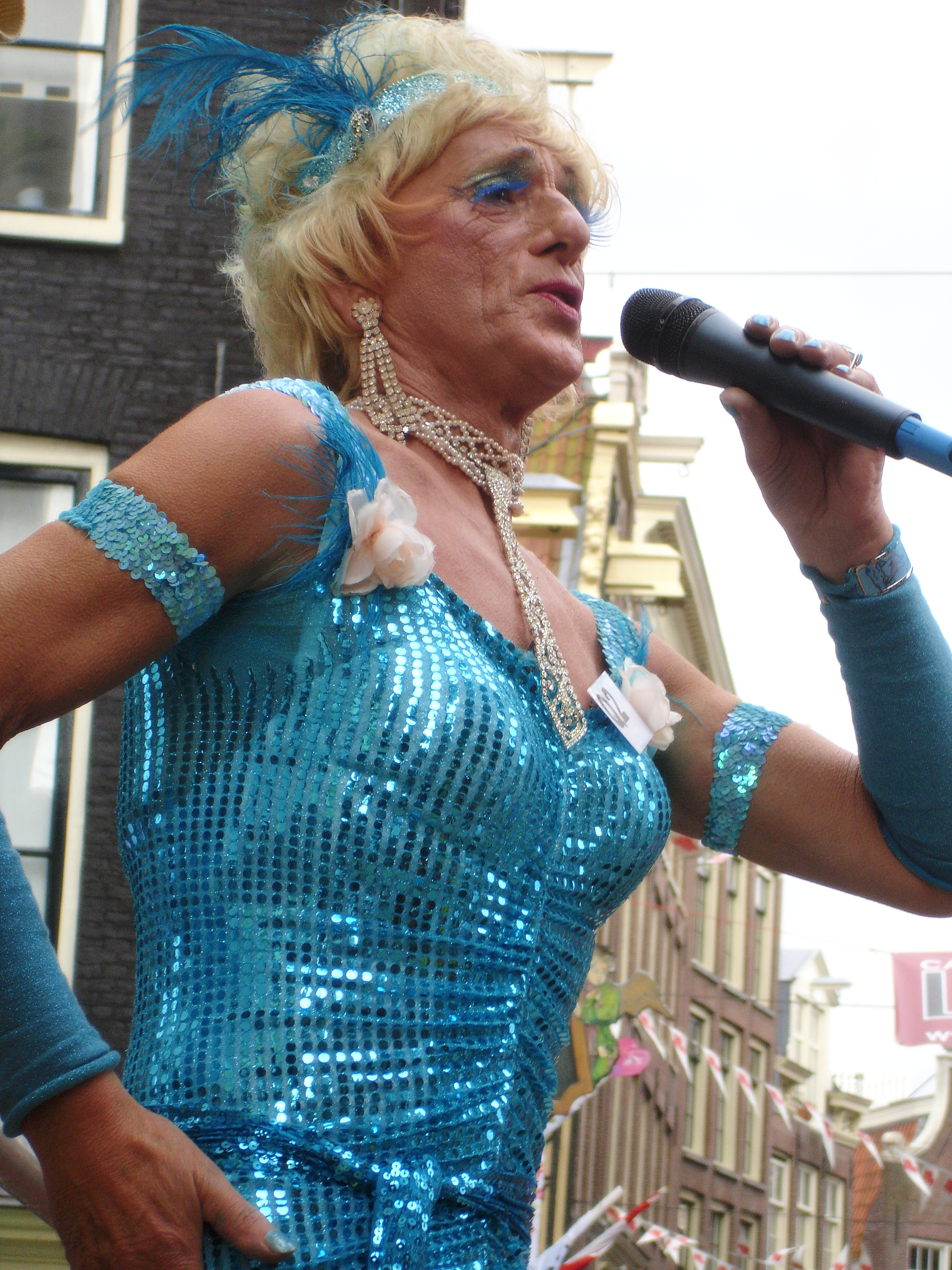

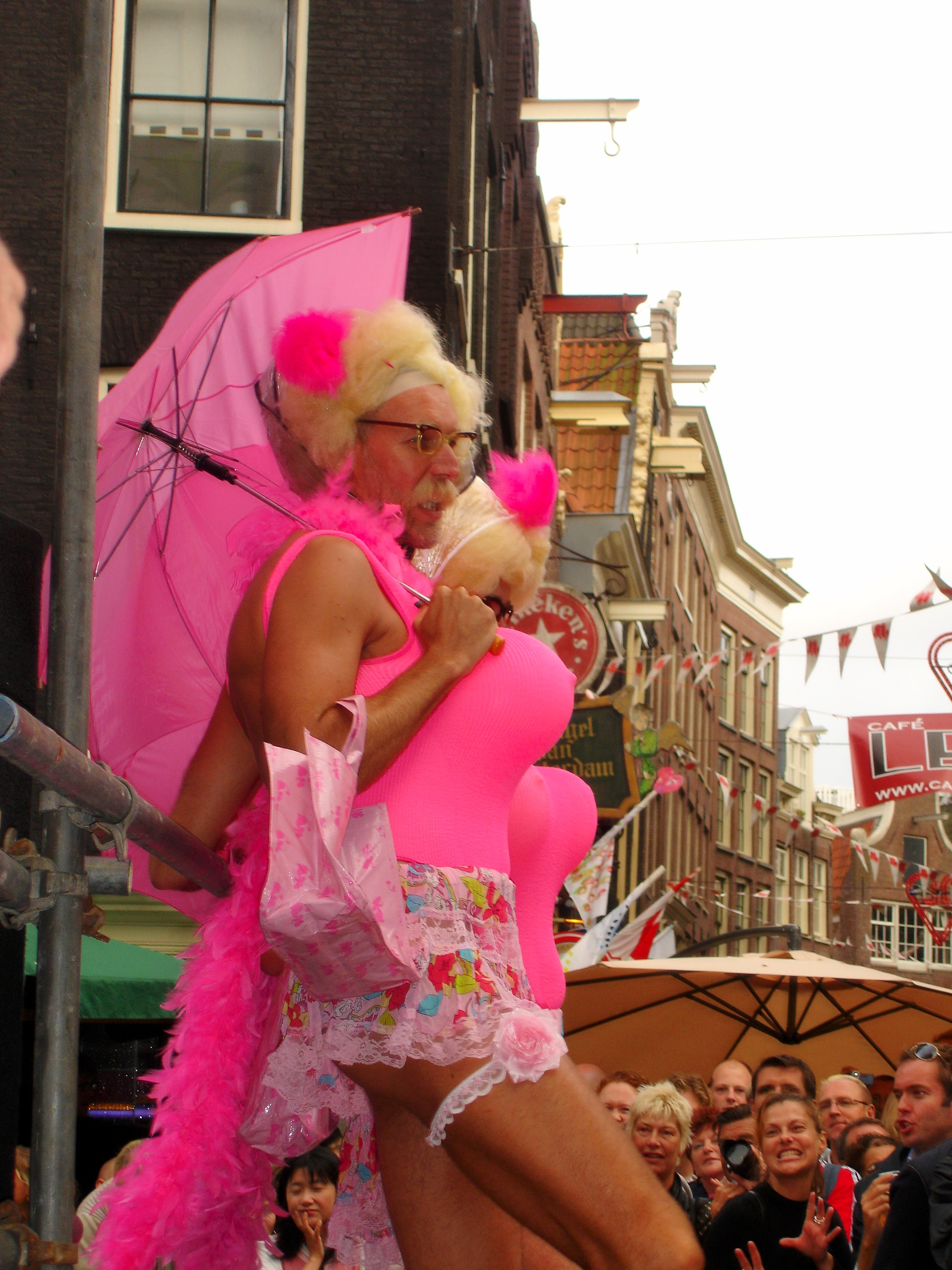

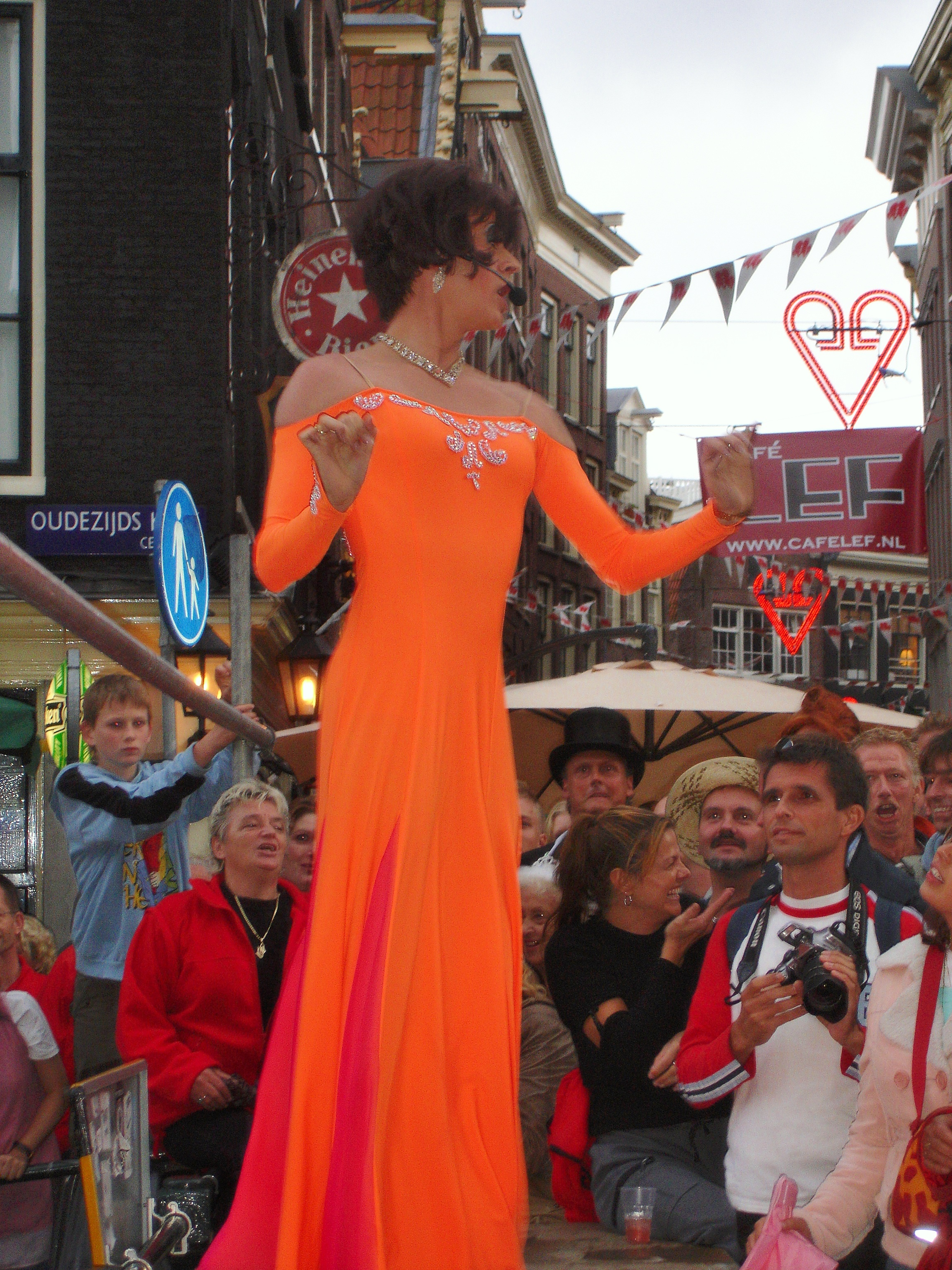

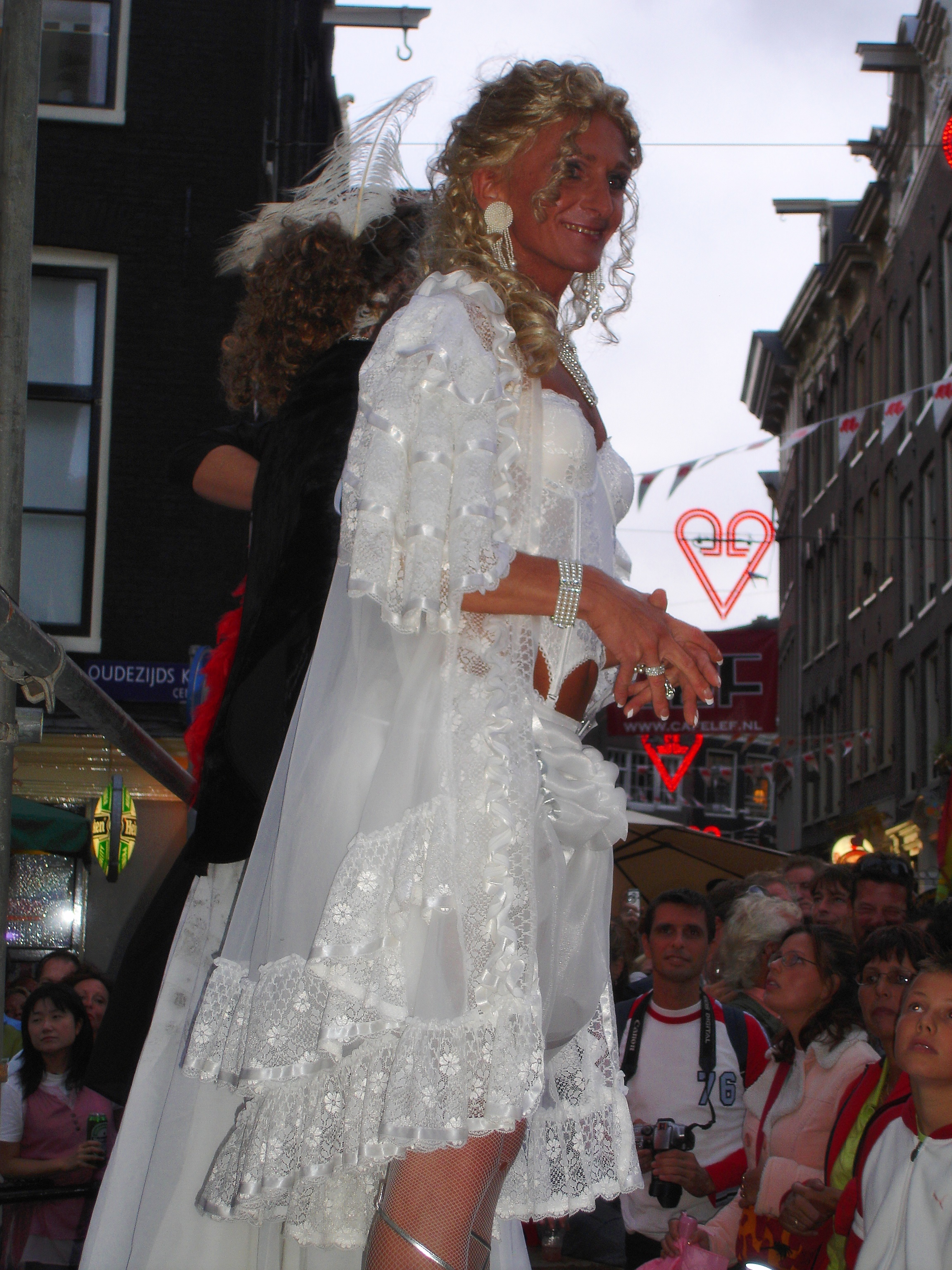

== See also ==
- Transvestism
