= Gay bar =

Drinking establishment catered to LGBTQ clientele

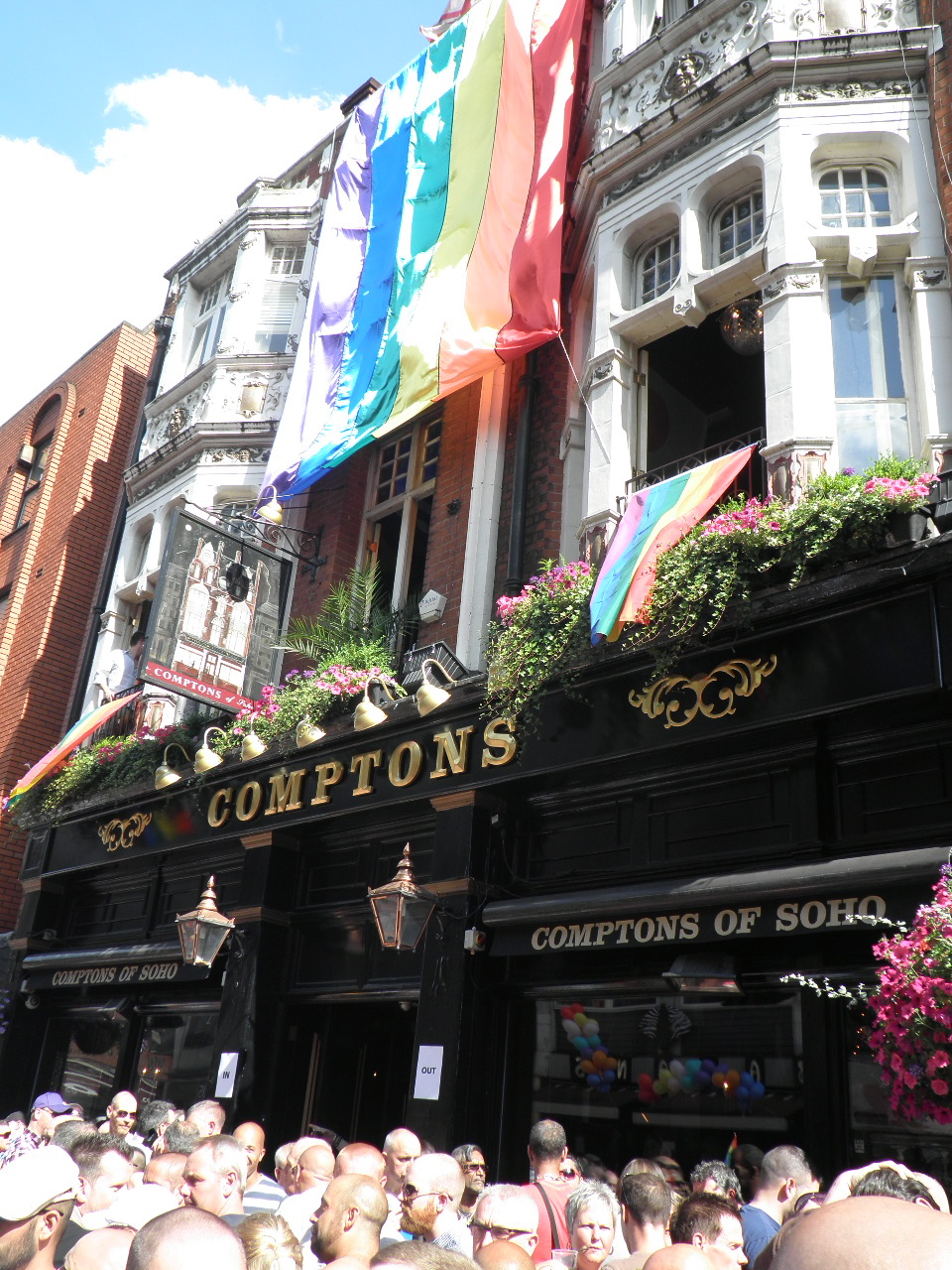
Comptons of Soho, London, UK. Taken during London Pride 2010.

A gay bar is a drinking establishment that caters to an exclusively or predominantly lesbian, gay, bisexual, transgender, and/or queer (LGBTQ+) clientele; the term gay is used as a broadly inclusive concept for LGBTQ+ communities.

Gay bars once served as the centre of gay culture and were one of the few places people with same-sex orientations and gender-variant identities could openly socialize. Other names used to describe these establishments include boy bar, girl bar, gay club, gay pub, queer bar, lesbian bar, drag bar, and dyke bar, depending on the communities that they serve.

With the advent of the Internet and an increasing acceptance of LGBTQ+ people across the Western world, the relevance of gay bars in the LGBTQ+ community has somewhat diminished. In areas without a gay bar, certain establishments may hold a gay night instead.

== Background ==
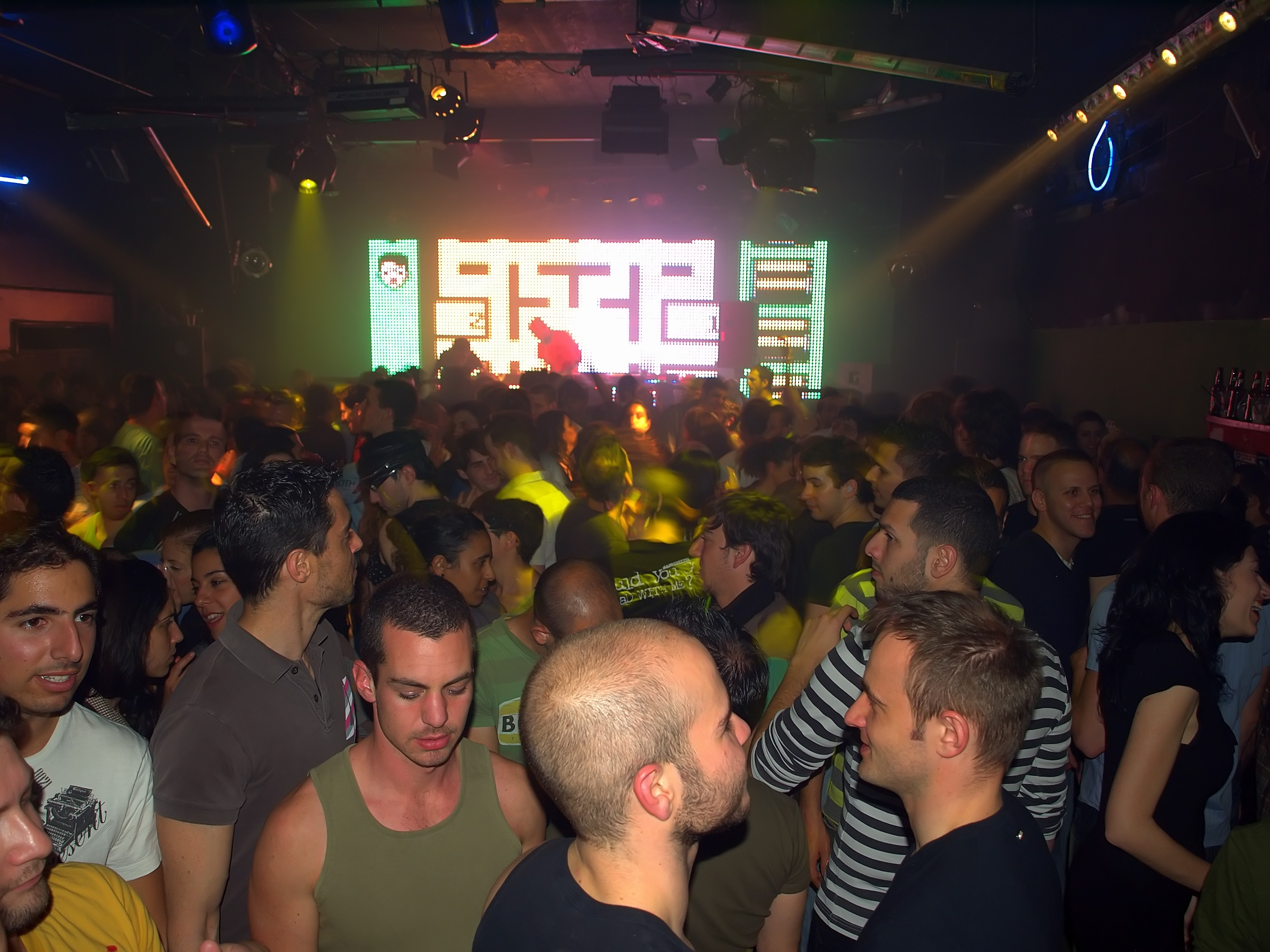
The interior of a gay bar in Tel Aviv, Israel, which features a dance floor and music

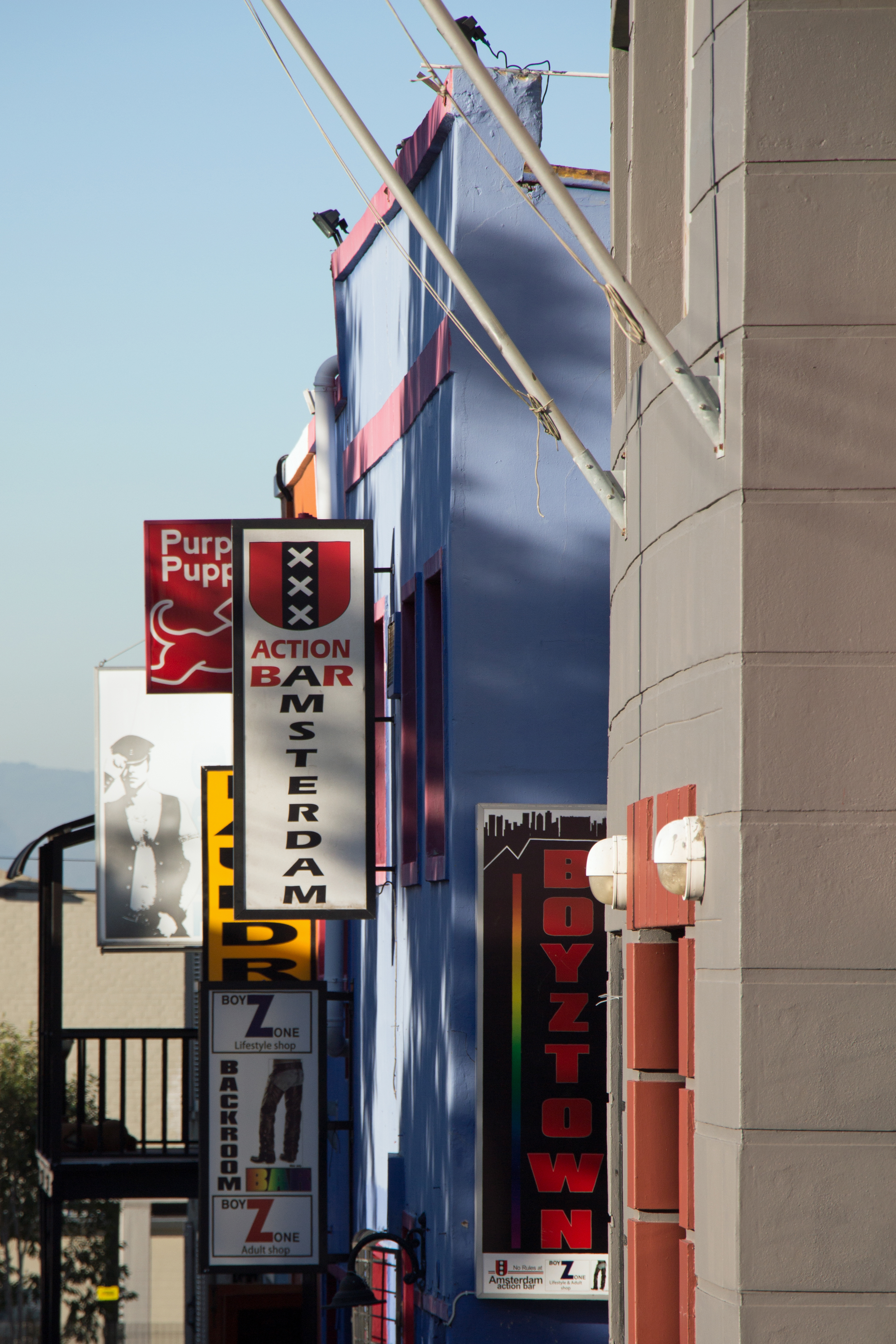
Hub of men-only gay bars in Cape Town, South Africa

Like most bars and pubs, gay bars range in size from the small, five-seat bars of Tokyo to large, multi-story clubs with several distinct areas and more than one dance floor. A large venue may be referred to as a nightclub, club, or bar, while smaller venues are typically called bars and sometimes pubs. The only defining characteristic of a gay bar is the nature of its clientele. While many gay bars target the gay and/or lesbian communities, some (usually older and firmly established) gay bars have become gay, as it were, through custom, over a long period of time.

The serving of alcohol is the primary business of gay bars and pubs. Like non-gay establishments they serve as a meeting place and LGBTQ+ community focal point, in which conversation, relaxation, and meeting potential romantic and sexual partners is the primary focus of the clientele. Historically and continuing in many communities, gay bars have been valued by patrons as the only place closeted gay men and lesbians can be open and demonstrative about their sexuality without fear of discovery. Gerard Koskovich of the Gay, Lesbian, Bisexual, Transgender Historical Society explains that "[Gay bars] were a public place where gay people could meet and start to have a conversation, where they didn't feel like sexual freaks or somehow not part of the larger social fabric; from that came culture, politics, demands for equal rights."

Gay bars traditionally preferred to remain discreet and virtually unidentifiable outside the gay community, relying exclusively on word of mouth promotion. More recently, gay clubs and events are often advertised by handing out eye-catching flyers on the street, in gay or gay-friendly shops and venues, and at other clubs and events. Similar to flyers for predominantly heterosexual venues, these flyers frequently feature provocative images and theme party announcements.

While traditional gay pub-like bars are nearly identical to bars catering to the general public, gay dance venues often feature elaborate lighting design and video projection, fog machines and raised dancing platforms. Hired dancers (called go-go girls or go-go boys) may also feature in decorative cages or on podiums. Gay sports bars are relatively unusual, but it is not unusual for gay bars to sponsor teams in local sports/game leagues, and many otherwise traditional gay pubs are well known for hosting post-game parties—often filling with local gay athletes and their fans on specific nights or when major professional sporting events are broadcast on TV. Some of the longest established gay bars are unofficial hosts of elaborate local 'Royal Court' drag pageants and drag-related social groups.

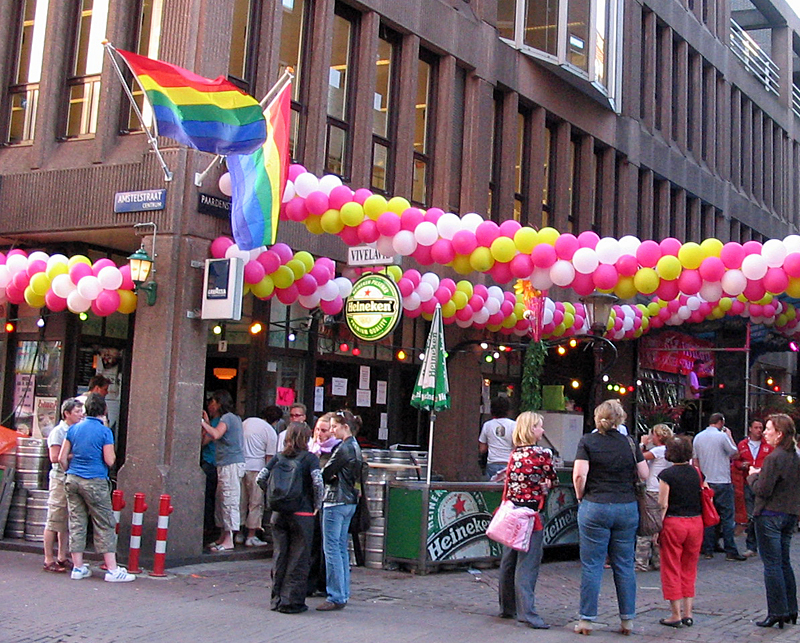
Lesbian bar Vivelavie in Amsterdam, 2008

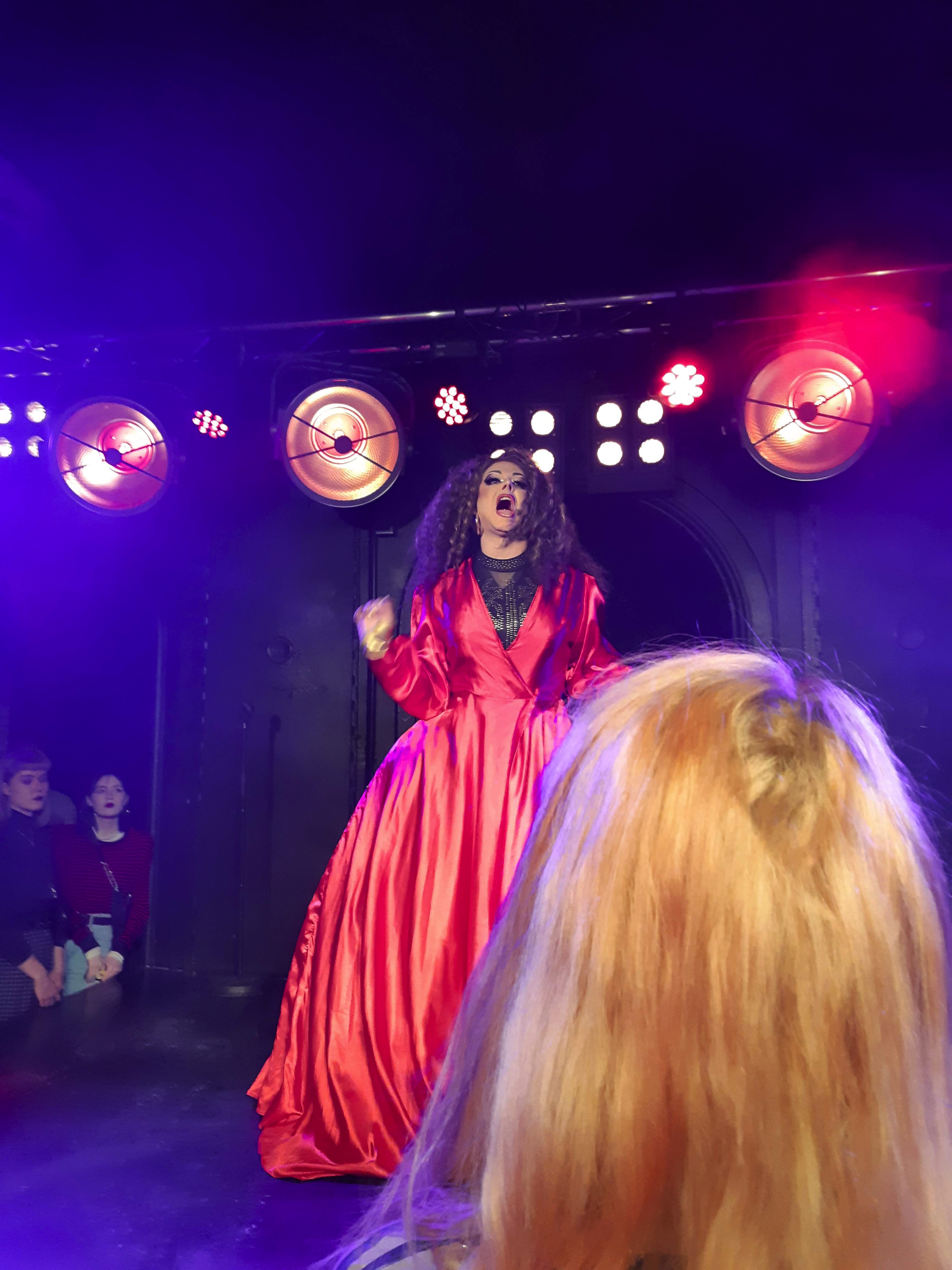
Finnish drag queen Miss B on stage at the DTM club in Helsinki, Finland, in 2019

Gay bars and nightclubs are sometimes segregated by sex. In some establishments, people who are perceived to be of the "wrong" sex (for example, a man attempting to enter a women's club) may be unwelcome or even barred from entry. This may be more common in specialty bars, such as gay male leather fetish or BDSM bars, or bars or clubs which have a strict dress code. It is also common in bars and clubs where sex on the premises is a primary focus of the establishment. On the other hand, gay bars are usually welcoming of transgender and cross-dressed people, and drag shows are a common feature in many gay bars, even men-only spaces. Some gay bars and clubs which have a predominantly male clientele, as well as some gay bathhouses and other sex clubs, may offer occasional women-only nights.

A few gay bars attempt to restrict entry to only gay or lesbian people, but in practice this is difficult to enforce. Most famously, Melbourne's Peel Hotel was granted an exemption from Australia's Equal Opportunities Act by a state tribunal, on the grounds that the exemption was needed to prevent "sexually-based insults and violence" aimed at the pub's patrons. As a result of the decision, the pub is legally able to advertise as a "gay only" establishment, and door staff can ask people whether they are gay before allowing them inside, and can turn away non-gay people.

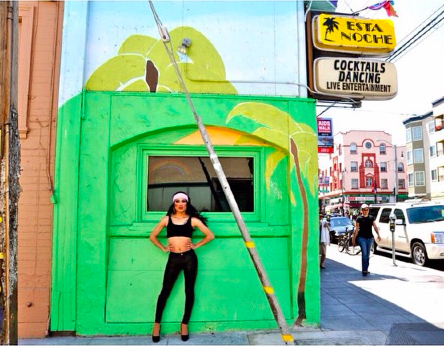
Vanity Ytinav in front of Esta Noche, a Latino gay bar in San Francisco

Already categorized as gay or lesbian, many gay bars in larger cities/urban areas take this sub-categorization a step further by appealing to distinct subcultures within the gay community. Some of these sub-cultures are defined by costume and performance. These bars often forge a like-minded community in dozens of cities with leather gay bars, line-dancing gay bars, and drag revues. Other subcultures cater to men who fit a certain type, one that is often defined by age, body type, personality, and musical preference. There are some bars and clubs that cater more to a working class/blue collar crowd and some that cater to a more upscale clientele. There are gay bars that cater to "twinks" (young, smooth-bodied pretty boys) and others that cater to bears (older, larger, hairier alternatives to the well-manicured and fey gay stereotype). There are also gay bars that cater to certain races, such as ones for Asian men "and their admirers", Latin men, or black men.

Music, either live or, more commonly, mixed by a disc jockey (DJ), is often a prominent feature of gay bars. Typically, the music in gay bars include pop, dance, Electropop, house, trance, and techno.

=== Gay cruise bar ===
A variation of the gay bar is the gay cruise bar. Normally gay bars usually prohibit sexual activity other than kissing or flirting on the premises, however cruise bars allow sex to happen on their property. Cruise bars have a secured entrance door so that only adults can enter, a cloakroom area to allow patrons to change, and seating that allow sexual activity to happen. There is usually an entrance change, however on special occasions it is waived. Mobile phones are banned for privacy reasons. Notable cruise bars include Vault 139 and Bunker Bar in London.

== History ==
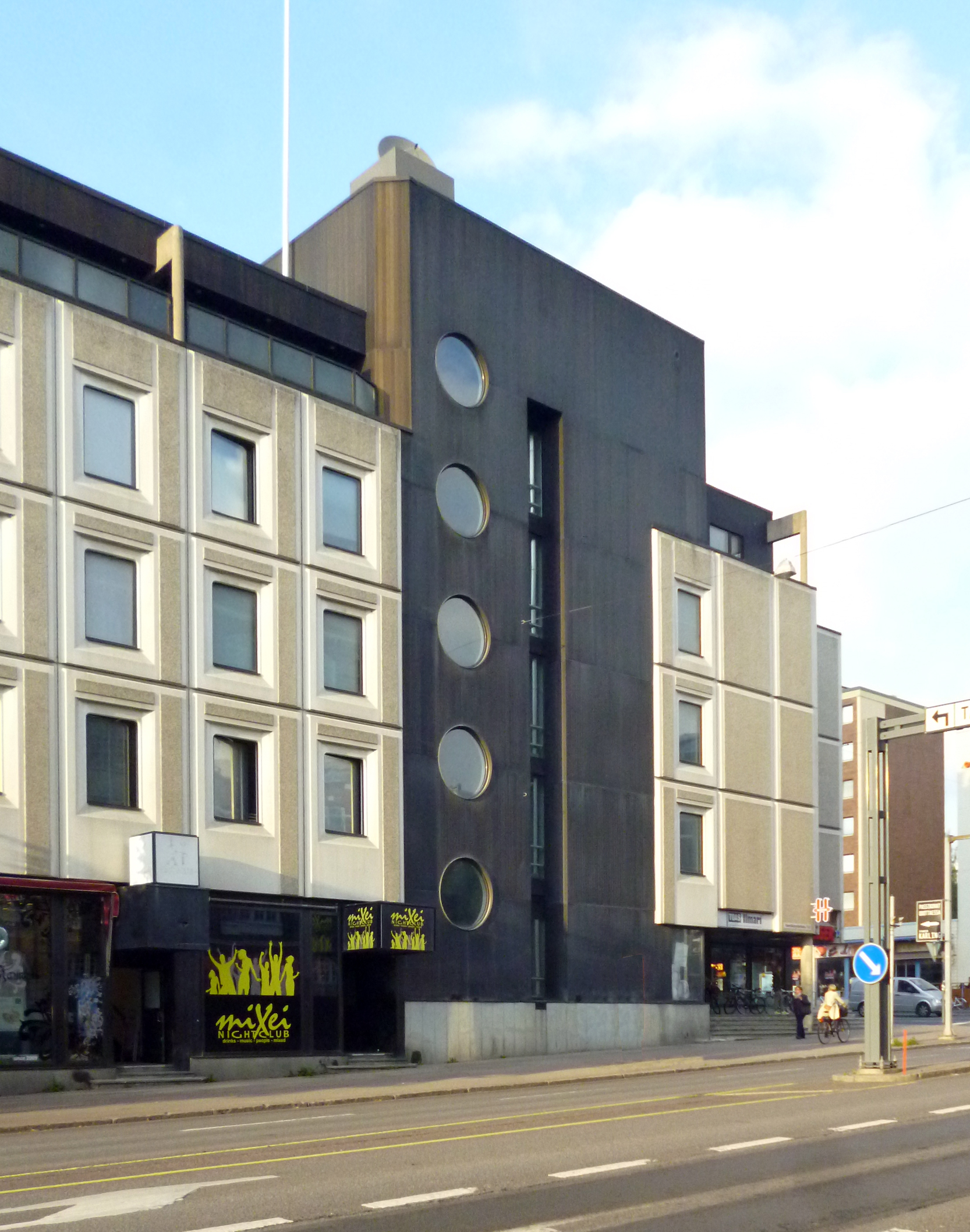
The Mixei nightclub in Tammela, Tampere, is the oldest still operating gay bar in Finland, having first opened its doors in 1990.

Gathering places favoured by homosexuals have operated for centuries. Reports from as early as the 17th century record the existence of bars and clubs that catered to, or at least tolerated, openly gay clientele in several major European cities. The White Swan (created by James Cook and Yardley, full name unknown) on Vere Street, in London, England, was raided in 1810 during the so-called Vere Street Coterie. The raid led to the executions of John Hepburn and Thomas White for sodomy. The site was the scene of alleged gay marriages carried out by the Reverend John Church.

It is not clear which place is the first gay bar in the modern sense. In Cannes, France, such a bar had already opened in 1885, and there were many more in Berlin around 1900. In the United Kingdom and the Netherlands gay bars were established throughout the first quarter of the 20th century.

=== China ===
The oldest gay bar in Beijing is the Half-and-Half, which in 2004 had been open over ten years. The first lesbian bar in China (also in Beijing) was Maple Bar, opened in 2000 by pop singer Qiao Qiao. The On/Off was a popular bar for both gay men and lesbians. The increase in China's gay and lesbian bars in recent years is linked to China's opening up to global capitalism and its consequent economic and social restructuring.

=== Denmark ===
The bar Centralhjørnet in Copenhagen opened in 1917 and became a gay bar in the 1950s. It is the oldest gay bar in Denmark and claims to be "the world's oldest gay bar". The main Copenhagen gay district is the Latin Quarter.

=== France ===
The very first gay bar in Europe and probably in the world was the Zanzibar in Cannes on the French Riviera. The Zanzibar was opened in 1885 and existed for 125 years, before it was closed in December 2010. Among its visitors were many artists, like actor Jean Marais and comedians Thierry Le Luron and Coluche.

Paris became known as a centre for gay culture in the 19th century, making the city a queer capital during the early 20th century, when the Montmartre and Pigalle districts were meeting places of the LGBTQ+ community. Although Amsterdam, Berlin, and London had more meeting places and organizations than Paris, the latter was known for the "flamboyance" of LGBTQ+ quarters and "visibility" of LGBTQ+ celebrities.

Paris retained the LGBTQ+ capital image after the end of World War II, but the center of the meeting place shifted to Saint-Germain-des-Prés. In the 1950s and 1960s the police and authorities tolerated homosexuals as long as the conduct was private and out of view, but gay bar raids occurred and there were occasions when the owners of the bars were involved in facilitating the raids. Lesbians rarely visited gay bars and instead socialized in circles of friends. Lesbians who did go to bars often originated from the working class. Chez Moune, opened in 1936, and New Moon were 20th-century lesbian cabarets located in Place Pigalle, which converted to mixed music clubs in the 21st century.

Since the 1980s, the Le Marais district is the center of the gay scene in Paris.

=== Germany ===
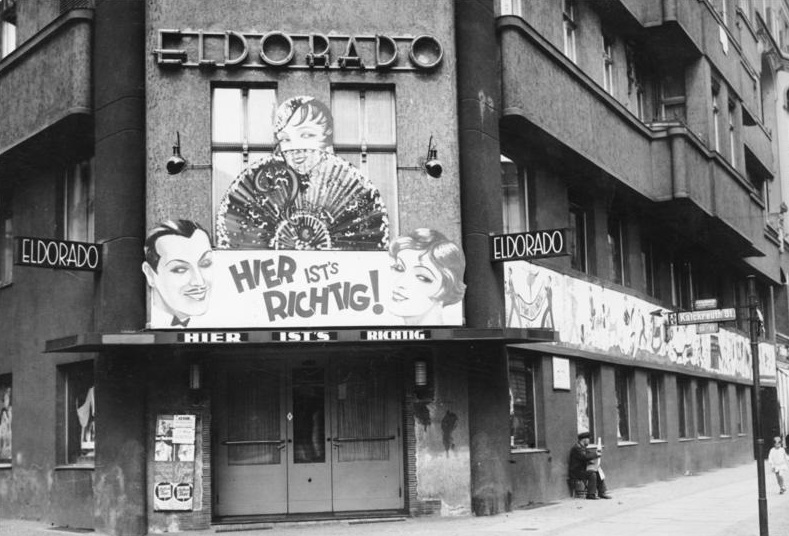
The gay club Eldorado in Berlin, 1932

In Berlin, there was gay and lesbian night life already around 1900, which throughout the 1920s became very open and vibrant, especially when compared to other capitals. Especially in the Schöneberg district around Nollendorfplatz there were many cafes, bars and clubs, which also attracted gay people who had to flee their own country in fear of prosecution, like for example Christopher Isherwood. The gay club Eldorado in the Motzstraße was internationally known for its transvestite shows. There was also a relatively high number of places for lesbians. Within a few weeks after the Nazis took over government in 1933, fourteen of the best known gay establishments were closed. After homosexuality was decriminalized in 1969, many gay bars opened in West Berlin, resulting in a lively gay scene.

In Munich, a number of gay and lesbian bars are documented as early as the Golden Twenties. Since the 1960s, the Rosa Viertel (pink quarter) developed in the Glockenbachviertel and around Gärtnerplatz, which in the 1980s made Munich "one of the four gayest metropolises in the world" along with San Francisco, New York City and Amsterdam. In particular, the area around Müllerstraße and Hans-Sachs-Straße was characterized by numerous gay bars and nightclubs. One of them was the travesty nightclub Old Mrs. Henderson, where Freddie Mercury, who lived in Munich from 1979 to 1985, filmed the music video for the song Living on My Own at his 39th birthday party. Other gay venues include Pompon Rouge, Mandy's Club, Pimpernel nightclub, the bar Mylord, the Ochsengarten, which was "Germany's first bar for leather men", as well as the gay hotel-pub Deutsche Eiche. Regulars in many of these bars and nightclubs include, for example, Freddie Mercury, Rainer Werner Fassbinder, Walter Sedlmayr (who met his later murderer in the Pimpernel), Inge Meysel and Hildegard Knef.

=== Japan ===
The oldest continuously operating Japanese gay bar, New Sazae, opened in Tokyo in 1966. Most gay bars in Tokyo are located in the Shinjuku Ni-chōme district, which is home to about 300 bars. Each bar may only have room to seat about a dozen people; as a result, many bars are specialized according to interest.

=== Mexico ===
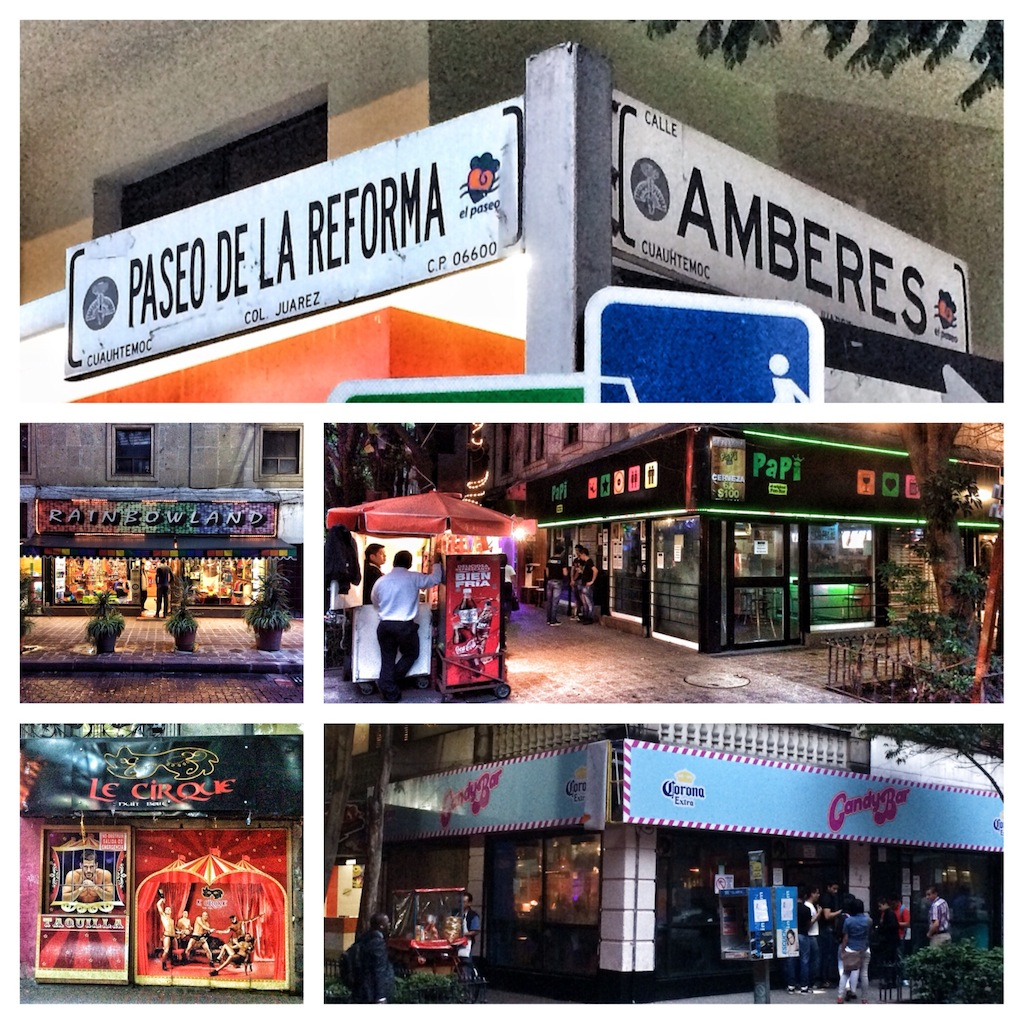
Amberes street in Mexico City's Zona Rosa is lined with gay bars.

Because of a raid on a Mexico City drag ball in 1901, when 41 men were arrested, the number 41 has come to symbolize male homosexuality in Mexican popular culture, figuring frequently in jokes and in casual teasing. The raid on the "Dance of the 41" was followed by a less-publicized raid of a lesbian bar on 4 December 1901 in Santa Maria. Despite the international depression of the 1930s and along with the social revolution overseen by Lázaro Cárdenas (1934–1940), the growth of Mexico City was accompanied by the opening of gay bars and gay bathhouses. During the Second World War, ten to fifteen gay bars operated in Mexico City, with dancing permitted in at least two, El África and El Triunfo. Relative freedom from official harassment continued until 1959 when Mayor Ernesto Uruchurtu closed every gay bar following a triple-murder. But by the late 1960s several Mexican cities had gay bars and, later, U.S.-style dance clubs. These places, however, were sometimes clandestine but tolerated by local authorities, which often meant that they were allowed to exist so long as the owners paid bribes. A fairly visible presence was developed in large cities such as Guadalajara, Acapulco, Veracruz and Mexico City. Today, Mexico City is home to numerous gay bars, many of them located in the Zona Rosa, particularly on Amberes street, while a broad and varied gay nightlife also flourishes in Guadalajara, Acapulco, in Cancún attracting global tourists, Puerto Vallarta which attracts many Americans and Canadians, and Tijuana with its cross-border crowd. However, there are at least several gay bars in most major cities.

=== Netherlands ===
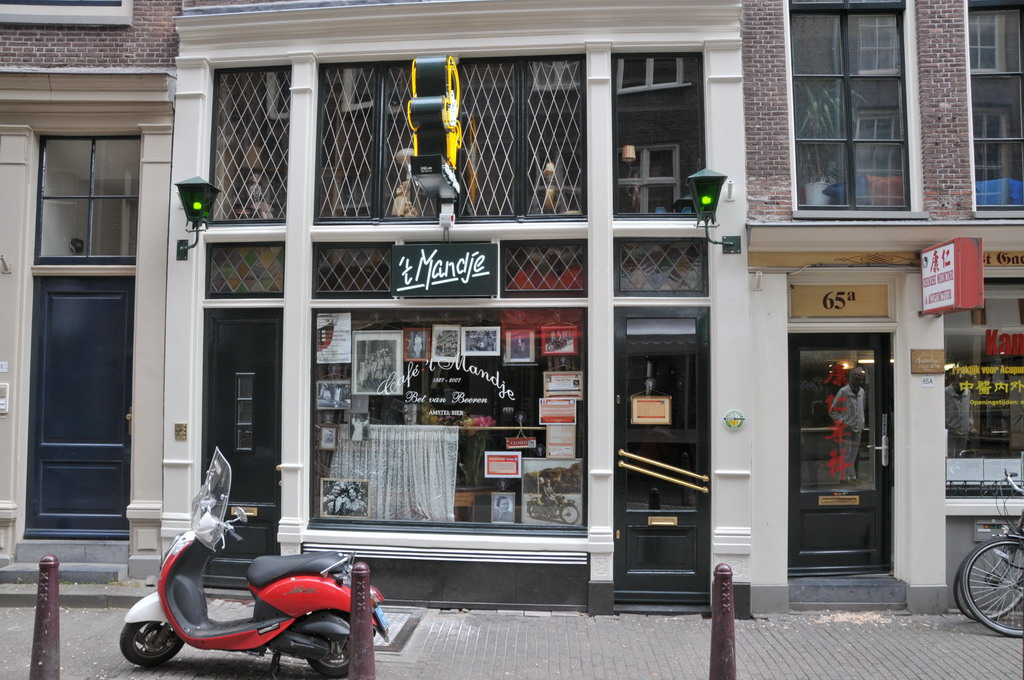
Café 't Mandje at Zeedijk in Amsterdam

In Amsterdam, there were already a few gay bars in the first quarter of the 20th century. The best known was The Empire, in Nes, which was first mentioned in 1911 and existed until the late 1930s. The oldest that still exists is Café 't Mandje, which was opened in 1927 by lesbian Bet van Beeren. It closed in 1982, but reopened in 2008.

After World War II, the Amsterdam city government acted rather pragmatic and tolerated the existence of gay bars. In the 1960s their number grew rapidly and they clustered in and around a number of streets, although this was limited to bars, clubs and shops and they never became residential areas for gays, like the gay villages in the US.

Since the late 1950s the main Amsterdam gay street was Kerkstraat, which was succeeded by Reguliersdwarsstraat in the early 1980s, when the first openly gay places opened here, like the famous cafe April in 1981, followed by dancing Havana in 1989. Other streets where there are still concentrations of gay bars are Zeedijk, Amstel and Warmoesstraat, the latter being the center of the Amsterdam leather scene, where the first leather bar already opened around 1955. The Queen's Head is a gay bar located at Zeedijk 20 in the centre of Amsterdam.

=== Russia ===
Because of the high prevalence of homophobia in Russia, patrons of gay bars there often have had to be on the alert for bullying and attacks. In 2013, Moscow's largest gay bar, Central Station, had its walls sprayed with gunfire, had harmful gas released into a crowd of 500 patrons, and had its ceiling nearly brought down by a gang who wanted to crush the people inside. Nonetheless, gay nightlife is increasing in Moscow and St. Petersburg, offering drag shows and Russian music, with some bars also offering discreet gay-only taxi services.

=== Singapore ===
The first recorded use of the term "gay bar" is in the diaries of homosexual British comedian Kenneth Williams: "16 January 1947. Went round to the gay bar which wasn't in the least gay." At the time Williams was serving in the British Army in Singapore. In the 1970s, straight nightclubs began to open their doors to gay clients on designated nights of the week. In the 1980s, a lesbian bar named Crocodile Rock opened in Far East Plaza, which remains to this day the oldest lesbian bar in Singapore. Today, many gay bars are located on the Neil Road stretch, from Taboo and Tantric, to Backstage Bar, May Wong's Café, DYMK and Play. Mega-clubs like Zouk and Avalon are also a big draw for the gay crowd.

=== South Africa ===
The history of gay and lesbian bars in South Africa reflects the racial divisions that began in the Apartheid era and continue, to some extent, in the 21st century.

The first white gay bar opened in the Carlton Hotel in downtown Johannesburg in the late 1940s, catering exclusively to men of wealth. In the 1960s, other urban bars began to open that drew more middle and working class white men; lesbians were excluded. The language of Gayle had its roots in the Cape Coloured and Afrikaans-speaking underground gay bar culture. In 1968, when the government threatened to pass repressive anti-gay legislation, queer culture went even further underground, which meant clubs and bars were often the only places to meet. These bars were often the targets of police raids. The decade of the 1970s was when urban gay clubs took root. The most popular gay club of Johannesburg was The Dungeon, which attracted females as well as males, and lasted until the 1990s. The 1979 police assault on the New Mandy's Club, in which patrons fought back, has been referred to as South Africa's Stonewall.

In the 1980s, police raids on white gay clubs lessened as the apartheid government forces found itself dealing with more and more resistance from the black population. In the black townships, some of the shebeens, unlicensed bars established in people's homes and garages, catered to LGBTQ clients. During the struggle against apartheid, some of these shebeens were important meeting places for black gay and lesbian resistance fighters. Lee's, a shebeen in Soweto, for example, was used as a meeting place for black gay men who were part of the Gay Association of South Africa (GASA) but did not feel welcome in the GASA offices.

With the establishment of the post-apartheid 1996 constitution that outlawed discrimination based on sexual orientation as well as race, South Africa's gay nightlife exploded, though many bars continued to be segregated by race, and fewer blacks than whites go to the urban bars. The 2005 inaugural gay shebeen tour was advertised as a gay pub crawl that would provide an opportunity for South Africans and foreigners to "experience true African gay Shebeen culture".

=== South Korea ===
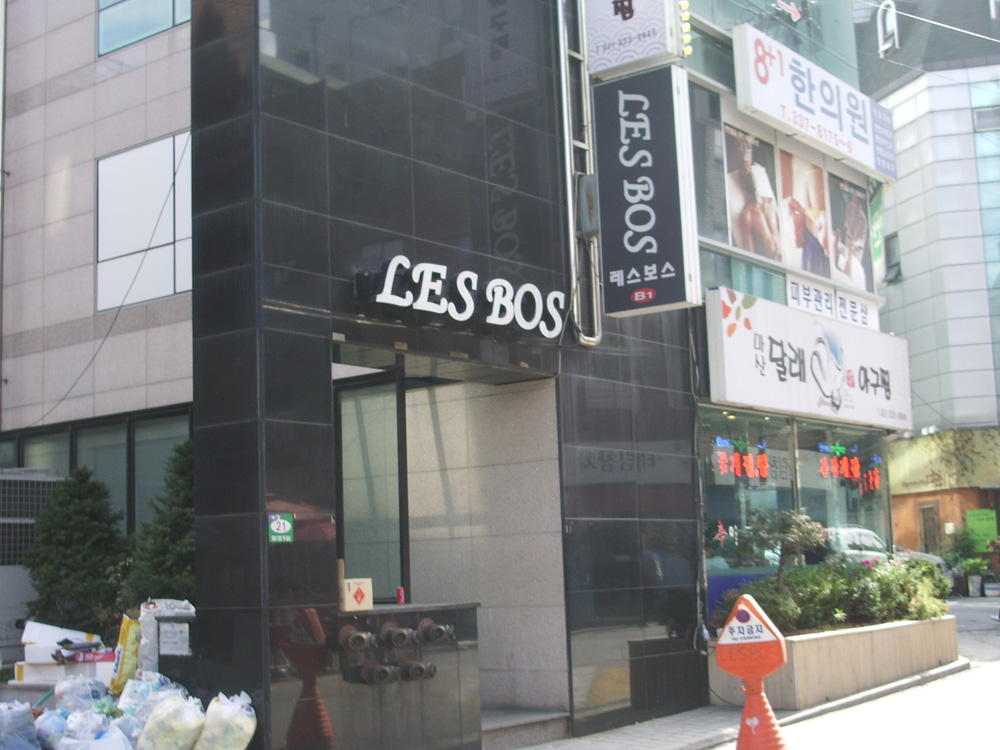
Lesbos bar in Sinchon, Seoul, South Korea 레스보스

In Seoul, most gay bars were originally congregated near the Itaewon area of Seoul, near the U.S. military base. But in recent years, more clubs have located in the Sinchon area, indicating that "safe spaces" for Korean LGBTQ+ people have extended beyond the foreign zones, which were traditionally more tolerant. One male bar patron said Korean bar culture was not as direct as in the United States, with customers indicating their interest in another customer by ordering him a drink through a waiter. The oldest lesbian bar in Seoul is Lesbos, which started in 1996.

=== Spain ===
Under the dictatorship of General Francisco Franco from 1939 to 1975, homosexuality was illegal. However, in 1962, Spain's first gay bar, Tony's, opened in Torremolinos and a clandestine gay bar scene also emerged in the 1960s and early 1970s in Barcelona.

=== Taiwan ===
In Taiwan, Gay bar culture was first brought to Taiwan by the US military stationed in the 1960s. In the 1970s, the first gay bar "Take" appeared in Taipei. At the same time, lesbians often held activities in American military bars and gay bars. It was not until 1985 that the first lesbian bar "Forgettable Valley" appeared. After the mid-1980s, Gay bars and T-bars sprouted up like mushrooms after a rain. In addition to Taipei, they also began to appear in Taichung and Kaohsiung. The style has also become diversified from simply drinking and chatting. For example, Funky in the 1990s divided its business hours into singing hours and dancing hours.

In the early 2000s, the human rights of gays and lesbians in Taiwan improved significantly. The gay nightlife entertainment scene shifted from being a scene opened by gays and only having gay customers. Some non-gay-only nightclubs were considered gay nightclubs because they gathered a large number of gays. Representative stores are TeXound and 2F.

Starting in 2007, gay bars began to move into the Ximen Red House, which was not operating well at that time. Relying on the gay customer base, this place gradually gathered a lot of popularity and became the first openly gay business district in Taiwan. Nowadays, Ximen Red House Bar Street is a must-visit attraction for gays from all over the world when visiting Taiwan.

Currently, the representative gay bars include Abrazo Bistro, Bacio Taipei, Belle's, Commander D, Fairy Taipei, G-Star, Ganymede, Hunt and Locker Room. There are also many small gay bars in Ximen Red House.

=== United Kingdom ===
In the 18th century, molly houses were clandestine clubs where gay men could meet, drink, dance and have sex with each other. One of the most famous was Mother Clap's Molly House.

The first gay bar in Britain in the modern sense was The Cave of the Golden Calf, established as a night club in London. It opened in an underground location at 9 Heddon Street, just off Regent Street, in 1912 and became a haunt for the wealthy, aristocratic and bohemian. Its creator Frida Strindberg née Uhl set it up as an avant-garde and artistic venture. The club provided a solid model for future nightclubs.

After homosexuality was partially decriminalized in the UK in 1967, gay bar culture became more visible and gradually Soho became the centre of the London LGBTQ+ community, which was "firmly established" by the early 1990s. Gay bars, cafes, restaurants and clubs are centred on Old Compton Street.

Other cities in the UK also have districts or streets with a concentration of gay bars, like for example Stanley Street Quarter in Liverpool, the Merchant City in Glasgow, Canal Street in Manchester and the Birmingham Gay Village.

=== United States ===
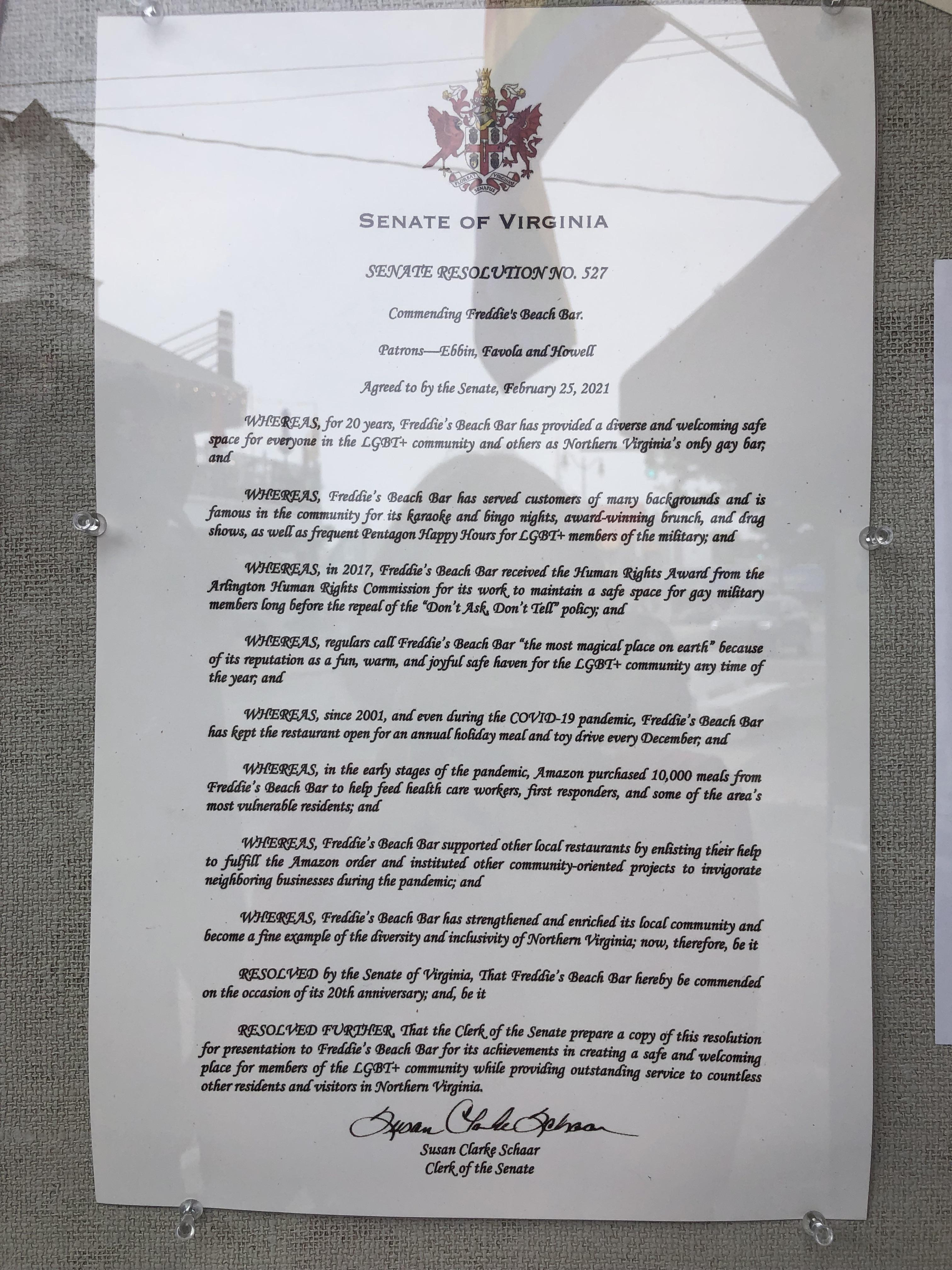
A 2021 Virginia State Senate resolution recognizing Freddie's Beach Bar, Northern Virginia's only gay bar at the time.

There are many institutions in the United States that claim to be the oldest gay bar in the country. Since Prohibition ended in 1933, there are a number of notable gay bars that have opened. In alphabetical order:

- The Atlantic House in Provincetown, Massachusetts, was constructed in 1798 and was a tavern and stagecoach stop before becoming a de facto gay bar after artists and actors, including Tennessee Williams, began spending summers in Provincetown in the 1920s.
- The Black Cat Bar, founded in 1906 and operated again after Prohibition was ended in 1933, was located in San Francisco's North Beach neighborhood and was the focus of one of the earliest victories of the homophile movement. In 1951, the California Supreme Court affirmed the right of homosexuals to assemble in a case brought by the heterosexual owner of the bar.
- The Black Cat Tavern opened in November 1966 and was one of many LGBTQ+ bars to be raided, which happened on New Year's Day in 1967. It is now considered a Los Angeles Historic-Cultural Monument.

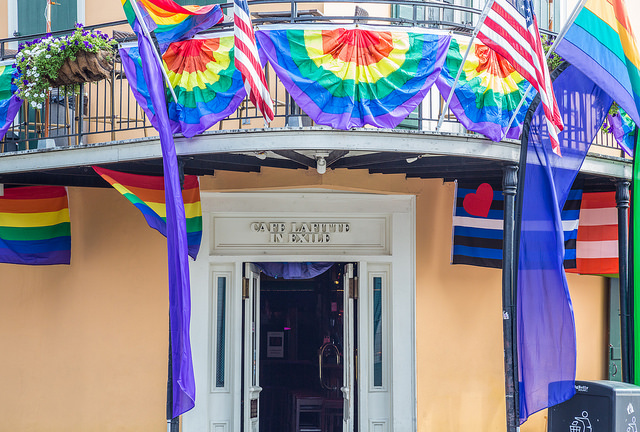
Cafe Lafitte in Exile, on Bourbon Street in New Orleans, opened in 1933, has a storied past, replete with celebrities.

- Cafe Lafitte in Exile in New Orleans, dating back to 1933 and the end of Prohibition, claims to be the oldest continuously operating gay bar in the United States.
- The Double Header in Seattle's Pioneer Square is claimed to be the oldest gay bar on the North American West Coast, operating since 1933.
- Esta Noche was the first gay Latino bar in San Francisco; it opened in 1979. It was located on Mission Street and 16th Street. It closed down in 1997 as one of the last gay Latino bars in the Mission District.
- Eve's Hangout was one of the first lesbian bars, also called Eve Adams Tearoom. It closed after a police raid in 1926. Eva Kotchever, the owner, was deported to Europe and murdered at Auschwitz.
- Julius Bar, founded by local socialite Matthew Nicol, is the first modern gay bar in New York City. It is where the Mattachine Society staged a "Sip-In" on 21 April 1966 challenging a New York State Liquor Authority rule that prohibited serving alcoholic beverages to gays on the basis that they were considered disorderly. The court ruling in the case that gays could peacefully assemble at bars would lead to the opening of the Stonewall Inn a block southwest in 1967, which in turn led to the 1969 Stonewall Riots. Julius is New York City's oldest continuously operating gay bar.
- Korner Lounge (1933) of Shreveport, Louisiana is believed to be the second oldest continuously operating gay bar in the country.
- Maud's Study (961 Cole Street, San Francisco), featured in the film Last Call at Maud's, was a lesbian bar which was founded by Rikki Streicher in 1966 and closed in September 1989. At closing, it claimed to be the oldest continuously operating lesbian bar. It closed during the AIDS crisis when a "clean and sober" mentality drove down a lot of bars.
- Nob Hill (1101 Kenyon St NW) In Washington D.C was a gay bar dedicated to providing a safe space for queer African-American men. Due to segregation many gay bars in the U.S. were centered around white queer people but from 1957 to 2004 Nob Hill was a space for Black queer people to celebrate. Nobb Hill was run for and by Black queer men and was one of the longest gay nightlife establishments in D.C and the entire country.
- The Tenth Floor club in Manhattan opened in 1972 and closed the following year. It was an early pioneer in disco music.
- The White Horse Inn in Oakland, California, operating legally since the end of Prohibition, but also likely illegally during it, claims to be the oldest gay bar in operation in the U.S.

== HIV/AIDS impact and response ==
Gay bars have been heavily impacted by the epidemiology of HIV/AIDS with both potential risk and crucial community support and education. Gay bars have always been a place of refuge and support for gay men and the HIV-affected community impacted by the virus. Cure fundraising, testing, support group, and free condom events have been present at gay bars. The National Institute of Health has noted that the gentrification of gay neighborhoods, the movement of more gay people into the suburbs, and decreased overall participation in AIDS and HIV related activism, health care providers are needing to turn to alternate venues to promote sexual wellness among this community. Turning to social media and other online resources, there has been an increase in these digital formats and approaches being used to spread HIV awareness among gay men around the world.

San Francisco had over 100 gay bars when the epidemic first hit in the early 1980s; by 2011 there were only about 30 remaining. During the worst years of the epidemic, before affordable and effective treatment, millions of gay men around the world died; consequently fewer persons owned or patronized gay bars.

A 2009 study revealed a correlation between gay bar attendance and certain high-risk sexual behaviors. Specifically, the research indicated that individuals who frequented gay bars were more likely to engage in insertive unprotected anal intercourse, including with partners whose HIV status differed from their own.

== Decline in locations ==
Some commentators have suggested that gay bars are facing decline in the contemporary age due to the pervasiveness of technology. Andrew Sullivan argued in his 2005 essay "The End of Gay Culture" that gay bars are declining because "the Internet dealt them a body blow. If you are merely looking for sex or a date, the Web is now the first stop for most gay men".

June Thomas explained the decline by noting that there is less need for gay-specific venues like bars because gay people are less likely to encounter discrimination or be made unwelcome in wider society. Entrepreneur magazine in 2007 included them on a list of ten types of business that would be extinct by 2017 along with record stores, used bookstores and newspapers.

Some commentators have argued there has been some recent decline in gay-specific venues mainly due to the modern effects of gentrification. By building physical spaces to host their community, gay men have introduced gay bars in urban neighborhoods to resist homophobia and ground a sense of belonging in the cities they live in and occupy. Gentrification of inner-cities via gay bars is partially a result of the efforts made by the LGBT community to instill hubs. But despite the decline, gay bars still exist in relatively strong numbers and thrive in most major cities where male homosexuality is not heavily condemned. They also asserted many gay men (especially men new to gay nightlife) still find some value in gay-specific venues and being in the company of other gay men. With there being an increase in LGBT acceptance throughout the United States, there appears to be a correlation between a decrease in the number of people within the community seeking out gay bars—as they are able to connect through other spaces and ways. The fate of established gay bars is affected by this transition and change in popularity as they may not be able to continue running due to lessened demand. Regarding gay bars in rural areas, there exists the possibility of LGBTQ+ members being affected by gentrification as people outside of the community move in surrounding spaces.

Unlike gay bars, lesbian bars have become a rarity around the world. Many articles have been published discussing possible reasons as to why lesbian bars struggle to exist despite a growing lesbian population. Reasons for the decline in Lesbian bars and other spaces for queer women include: the popularity of the internet for women to meet and create community, and finances/funding for queer establishments. As queer women have leaned towards social media to meet people, presence at queer-centered spaces has gone down, which has affected the economic stability/standing of Lesbian bars. The more reclusive spending practices and culture of queer women is also a factor that may be connected to the decline of Lesbian bars.

== Gentrification ==
Gay bars have historically been connected to the process of gentrification—people in the LGBTQ+ community have been both victims and/or agents. Complexities arise at the assessment of gentrification and the LGBTQ+ community as gay bars along with other queer-led establishments have at times been forms of infrastructure that contribute to driving out previous communities—which are oftentimes lower-class people of color living in urban areas. And as an effect of historic “gayborhoods” remodeling and renovating areas, there have been price increases on rent that in turn make it difficult for LGBTQ+ people to remain. Thus, the presence of the gay community in major cities becomes dispersed, leading to establishments such as gay bars closing or having a lower clientele. As changes in the current population of certain areas across the country can be traced back to institutional and financial forces that drive out residing demographics of certain races and class identities. The matter of gentrification and people of color in the LGBTQ+ community thus becomes complicated and nuanced—as these individuals are then in a divided positioned that places aspects of their identities at a cross.

The matter of displacement caused by gentrification in gay neighborhoods is complicated through the experiences of individuals within the greater queer community—with factors such as race, income, and sexuality. People within the LGBTQ+ community engage with gentrification from different sides as they move to seek refuge in big cities, which may eventually lead to previous tenants being priced out. And as some spaces with a high density of LGBTQ+ clientele continue to grow and gain popularity, people outside of the community might begin to move in which drives out the queer community, thus patronage in gay bars decreases—affecting their profits and stability.

In major cities such as San Francisco and Atlanta, there have been documented studies that explore the formation of queer neighborhoods—which often exclude or become a force that leads to the removal of the communities living there previously. A class barrier becomes established, which then also excludes the queer working-class residents of people of color in the area who cannot afford access to the spaces led and dominated by affluent white gay men. In an effort to escape verbal and physical violence, the gay community has sought to move to places such as the Castro District in San Francisco to avoid the chances of being targeted. Living in fear of hate crimes, many gayborhoods have a history of being formed out of a desire to form havens for the community. As some people living near or in those neighborhoods begin to notice the increase in queer people moving in, along with being priced out, there are also people who willingly seek to make a profit on selling their home to people who find the area attractive due to the popularity.

== Controversy ==
Date rape drugs at gay bars are a common problem. Gay bars have issued public service announcements to warn patrons to watch their drinks and never leave them unattended. In addition to sexual assault, date rape drugs have been used to rob bar patrons. Some authors, like George Johnson, have criticized racist behaviors by both white patrons and white owners of gay bars.

=== Pinkwashing ===
The presence of gay bars has been used to make political arguments about the safety and desirability of neighborhoods and communities. In the case of Israel, the presence of established gay bars and the publicized government stance of LGBT acceptance has been used to advertise the country as a safe and progressive location in West Asia for LGBT people. Image of gay bars frequently occur in Israeli marketing campaigns for “pink dollars.” This practice of using gay bar to promote Israel's agenda both internationally and domestically has been termed “pinkwashing.” Numerous accounts by queer Palestinians reflect a common sentiment of hostility while in gay bar spaces in Israel. This often begins by them having to go through checkpoints when attempting to access those spaces. When their queerness is acknowledged by police and at border checkpoints, it typically intensifies the abuse rather than mitigating it, serving as a vulnerability rather than a form of protection.

== List of gay bars ==
This is not a complete list of gay bars around the world.

Argentina

- Amerika, Buenos Aires

Canada

- Woody's, Toronto

Colombia

- Theatron, Bogotá

Denmark

- Pan Club Copenhagen (closed 2007)

Finland

- DTM, Helsinki
- Hercules, Helsinki

Ireland

- The George, Dublin
- Panti Bar, Dublin

Netherlands

- Café 't Mandje

Puerto Rico

- Loverbar

Thailand

- Sunee Plaza, a close collection of gay bars

United Kingdom

- Admiral Duncan, London
- Comptons of Soho, London
- Royal Vauxhall Tavern, London
- G-A-Y, London
- The Black Cap, London
- The Coleherne, London (closed)
- London Astoria (closed)
- Heaven, London
- Cruz 101, Manchester
- The New Penny, Leeds
- The Joiners Arms, Hackney, London
- The Golden Lion, London - a former gay pub, now an ordinary pub

United States

- Axis Nightclub, The Short North, Columbus, Ohio
- The Abbey, West Hollywood, California
- Black Banana, Philadelphia (closed)
- Black Cat Bar, San Francisco (closed)
- Black Cat Tavern, Silverlake, Los Angeles, California (closed)
- Blueberry Hill, Durham, North Carolina (closed)
- Boxer's Ringside, Durham, North Carolina (closed)
- CC Slaughters, Portland, Oregon
- Club Universe, San Francisco (closed)
- Down the Street, Asbury Park, New Jersey (closed)
- Embers Avenue, Portland, Oregon
- Hobo's, Portland, Oregon
- Jewel's Catch One, Los Angeles (closed)
- Julius, New York City
- Legends Nightclub, Raleigh, North Carolina
- Neon Boots Dancehall & Saloon, Houston, Texas
- Paddock Club, Greenville, North Carolina (closed)
- Phase 1, Washington, D.C.
- Pint, Jersey City, New Jersey
- Pulse, Orlando, Florida (closed after a mass shooting on the night of June 12, 2016)
- Red Cap Garage, Portland, Oregon (closed)
- Silverado, Portland, Oregon
- South Beach, Houston, Texas
- Stag PDX, Portland, Oregon
- Stonewall Inn, New York City
- This Is It!, Milwaukee, Wisconsin (closed)
- Three Sisters Tavern, Portland, Oregon (closed)
- Velvet Nation at Nation, Washington, D.C. (closed)
- Ziegfeld's, Washington, D.C.

== List of lesbian bars ==
While some gay bars open their doors to all LGBTQ people, other bars cater specifically to lesbians. In recent years many popular lesbian bars have closed down. In 2015, JD Samson made a documentary exploring the very few remaining lesbian bars in the United States. Although the number of established Lesbian bars in the United States has decreased, the spaces that remain serve as core locations for queer women to socialize and be in community. The attendance of queer women in lesbian bars is often higher when they are younger—with older queer women seeking lesbian bars at a lesser rate. The correlation between the stage of self-discovery and desire to attend social spaces such as lesbian bars addresses a shift as people find and connect with the queer community in other ways with time. While queer women feel more comfortable in lesbian bars compared to heterosexual bars, a lack of funds serves as a major reason for dwindling locations.

United States

- As You Are Bar, Washington, DC
- Babes of Carytown, Richmond, VA
- Blush & Blu, Denver, CO
- Chances Bar, Houston (closed)
- Henrietta Hudson, New York, NY
- Herz, Mobile, AL
- Lipstick Lounge, Nashville, TN
- Maud's, San Francisco (closed)
- Peg's Place, San Francisco (closed)
- Phase 1, Washington, D.C. (closed)
- Slammers, Columbus, OH
- Sue Ellen's, Dallas, TX
- The Lexington Club, San Francisco, CA (closed)
- Toasted Walnut, Philadelphia, PA (closed)
- Wildrose, Seattle, WA
- Wild Side West, San Francisco, CA

United Kingdom

- Candy Bar, Soho (closed)
- Gateways club (London) (closed)

== See also ==
- Circuit party
- Gay village
- Homosocialization
- Index of drinking establishment-related articles
- List of bars
- Lloyd G. Davies, Los Angeles City Council member, 1943–51, fought against "undesirable" bars in Hollywood, California
- Our Happy Hours: LGBT Voices from the Gay Bars
- Party and play
