= Affected community =

An affected community indicates a community affected by a disease. This may refer to:

- HIV-affected community
- Leper colony
- A community affected in an epidemic or pandemic
