= John Church =

John Church may refer to:

== Politicians ==
- John Barker Church (1748–1818), American financier, briefly an MP in the UK Parliament
- John Church (MP for Leicester), see Leicester (UK Parliament constituency)
- John Church (politician) (1859–1937), Australian politician

== Others ==
- John Church (clergyman) (1780–c. 1835), clergyman involved in the homosexual scandal of the Vere Street Coterie
- John Church (footballer) (1919–2004), English footballer
- John H. Church (1892–1953), U.S. Army officer
