= Disneyland After Dark: Pride Nite =

Event at Disneyland

- Date: Every June
- Time: 9:00 pm (Pacific Standard Time)
- Duration: 5 hours
- Location: Anaheim, CA, United States and Disneyland
- Theme: LGBTQ

Disneyland After Dark: Pride Nite is the official LGBTQ pride celebration held at Disneyland Park in Anaheim, California. It is the first official LGBTQ event at the Disneyland Resort. The event was inspired by the Disneyland Paris Pride event at Disneyland Resort Paris and is a part of the Disneyland After Dark event series. This event comes 25 years after the first unofficial Gay Days Anaheim.

== History ==
Concept art for the event's themed costumes.

The event was announced April 13, 2023. The private event is intended for the LGBTQIA community and their allies. The event included Disney character Meet and Greets such as Phastos from Eternals, Cruella de Vil from 101 Dalmatians, Terk and Jane Porter from Tarzan, Princess Tiana and Prince Naveen from The Princess and the Frog, photo opportunities at rainbow steps in Main Street U.S.A and a rainbow crosswalk in Fantasyland, Mickey Mouse, Donald Duck, Goofy, Minnie Mouse, Clarabelle Cow, and Daisy Duck dressed in outfits designed specifically for the event, a pride parade called the Pride Night Cavalcade which travels down Main Street U.S.A, a Lilo & Stitch themed dance party called the Ohana Dance Party, a dance party called Pride Nite Dance Club at the Rivers of America, line dancing at the Golden Horseshoe Saloon restaurant, unlimited Disney PhotoPass digital photo downloads, specialty food and drinks, themed merchandise, and a fireworks show called Welcome, which includes songs from films such as "Show Yourself" from Frozen II, "Reflection" from Mulan (2020), and "This is Me" from The Greatest Showman.

== Reactions ==
Christian Martinez of the Los Angeles Times wrote that organizers of the unofficial Disney holiday, Gay Days Anaheim, responded positively to the announcement of Pride Nite. Eddie Shapiro, the organizer of Gay Days Anaheim, responded by saying "in the wake of everything that’s happening to the country, that Disney is coming out in support of the community and inviting the community in, in this way, I think is a great thing." Some conservatives expressed displeasure with the event and claimed that they would not go to Disneyland again or watch any Disney films or television shows because of the event. Some called the Walt Disney Company "groomers" because of the event.
