= Pint (gay bar) =

Gay bar in Jersey City, New Jersey

- Interactive map of Pint
- Former names: El Negro Tavern, Star Bar
- Location: Jersey City, New Jersey, U.S.
- Coordinates: 40.719029°N 74.043741°W
- Capacity: 48
- Type: Gay bar

Construction
- Opened: 1911

Website
- pintjerseycity.com

Pint is a gay bar serving craft beer in Jersey City, New Jersey in the United States. First opened in 1911, it is the oldest continuously operating bar in Jersey City.

== Location ==
Pint is located at 34 Wayne Street in Jersey City. Pint is Jersey City's oldest continuously operating bar, which first opened in 1911. Former mayor of Jersey City Frank Hague ran the bar as a speakeasy during Prohibition.

United States Navy veteran Wolf Sterling purchased the bar in 2009. The bar began operating as a gay bar after Sterling purchased it. He now operates the bar with co-owner Tommy DeMaio.

The bar is a "hole in the wall" or small establishment. It is decorated with 600 vintage tap handles that Sterling has collected.

== Recent history ==
In October 2013, Pint co-hosted a "Big Gay Wedding Reception" with gay social group Gayborhood to celebrate same-sex marriage becoming legal in New Jersey.

In September 2015, a Regional Industries sanitation worker was fired after being accused of refusing to make trash collections from the bar unless he was served free drinks. In August, a Jersey City Incinerator Authority employee told a worker at Pint that his supervisor had told him that he could no longer collect recycling, but that be would do so if he and his team were given liquor on a weekly basis. Sterling said that when he went to report the incident to the Jersey City Incinerator Authority he was told that city inspectors would visit his bar, he perceived this as a threat not to proceed with the complaint.

In 2016, the bar ended sales of Yuengling and closed the bar's account with its distributor (Peerless Beverage Company) after the brewery announced its support for Donald Trump.

In 2022, the bar has raised more than $10,000 in funds to support the Ukrainian military during the Russo-Ukrainian war, Sterling said: "It’s one thing to say you support Ukraine, we felt we needed to demonstrate our tangible support".

In September 2023, an employee at the bar was assaulted by a person who used homophobic slurs to describe the bar's patrons. The assailant had first asked staff why there were rainbow flags flying at the establishment. After being told it was a gay bar, the owner said that the assailant "flew into a rage" and said: "gay people and gay bars should be illegal." Councilman James Solomon described it as a "disgraceful hate incident" and said that "hate has no home here in Jersey City".

In October 2026, the bar apologized after a team at its trivia night won best team name with the name "Cornell 7 inches" in reference to the 2024 Cornell University rape allegations. Bar co-owners Wolf Sterling and Tommy DeMaio immediately fired the trivia host, the owners then pledged all proceeds from trivia night would be donated to sexual violence prevention programs.
