= DTM (nightclub) =

Gay nightclub in Helsinki, Finland

- Photograph of DTM's logo

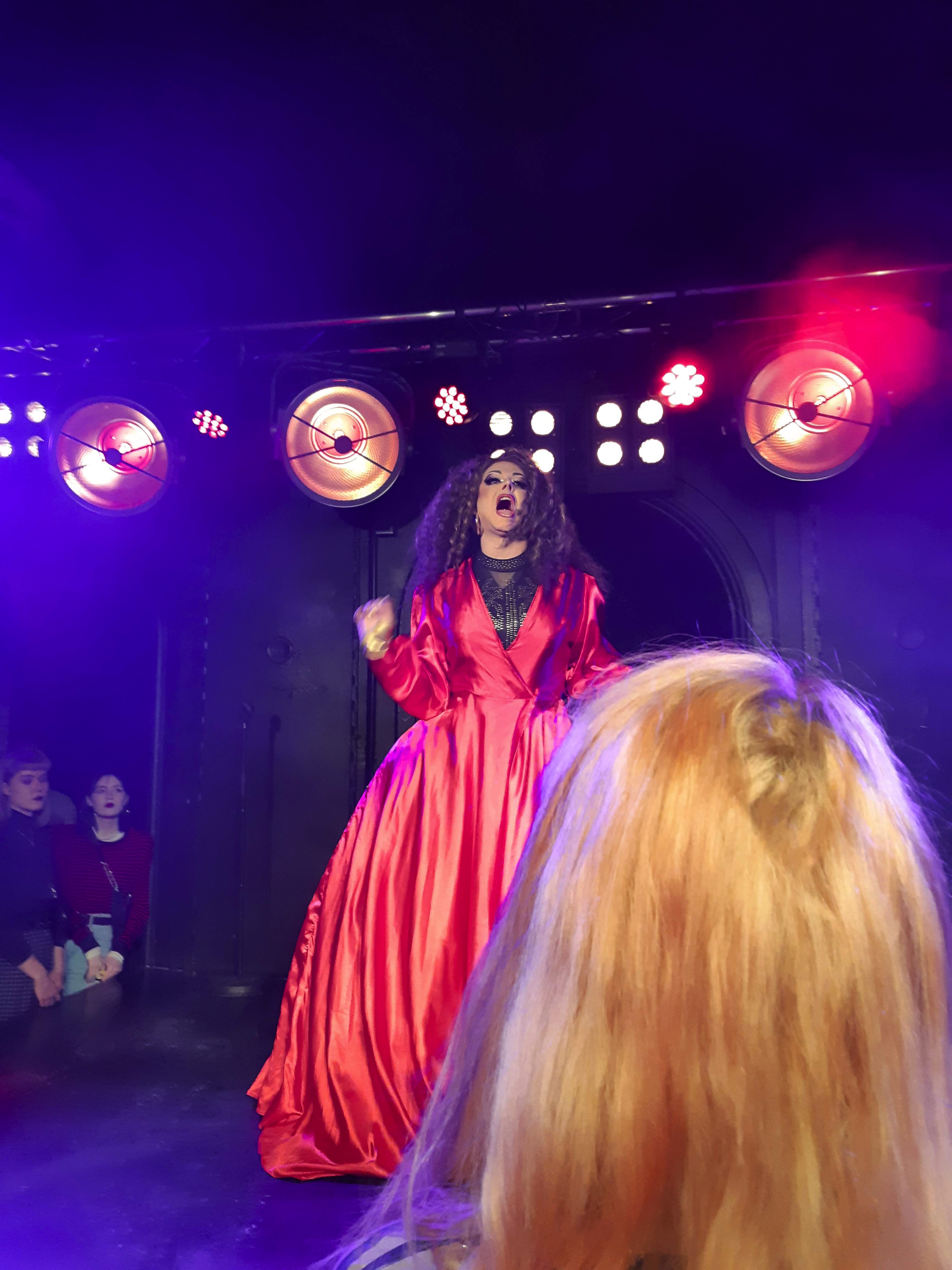
- Finnish drag queen Miss B on stage at DTM's Mannerheimintie location in 2019
- Interactive map of DTM
- Address: Työpajankatu 2a
- Location: Helsinki, Finland
- Coordinates: 60.1904°N 24.9700°E
- Owner: Ravintola Oy Afrodite (1992–2012); Äkä Oy (2012–present)
- Type: Gay bar; nightclub
- Public transit: Helsinki central railway station (metro); Kamppi metro station

Construction
- Opened: 1992
- Closed: 2025

Website
- dtm.fi

DTM (originally Don't Tell Mama) was an LGBTQ nightclub in Helsinki, Finland. Founded in 1992, it was once the largest gay club in Northern Europe. The venue was initially situated in Helsinki's Kamppi neighborhood and subsequently relocated three times: to Iso Roobertinkatu in Punavuori in 2003, to Mannerheimintie in Kluuvi in 2012, and to Teurastamo in Kalasatama in 2023.

Popular with gay men, DTM also catered to a straight and lesbian customer base. The club's playlists contained primarily pop songs, dance music, techno and Finnish hits, with live entertainment often taking the form of drag shows. Through an agreement with UK-based promoter Klub Kids, DTM hosted visiting performers from RuPaul's Drag Race from January 2019 to early 2020, when the Mannerheimintie venue closed.

The club temporarily ceased operation due to the COVID-19 pandemic, but following a protracted conflict over noise complaints from a neighboring hotel—which ended in June 2020—the Mannerheimintie location's rental agreement was dissolved. In April 2025, most of the staff and resident DJs at DTM's new home in Kalasatama resigned in protest of management that they feared would compromise DTM's principles and status as a safe space for the LGBTQ community. On 12 June, the club announced via social media that its parent company had filed for bankruptcy and that it would be closing its doors.

== Description ==
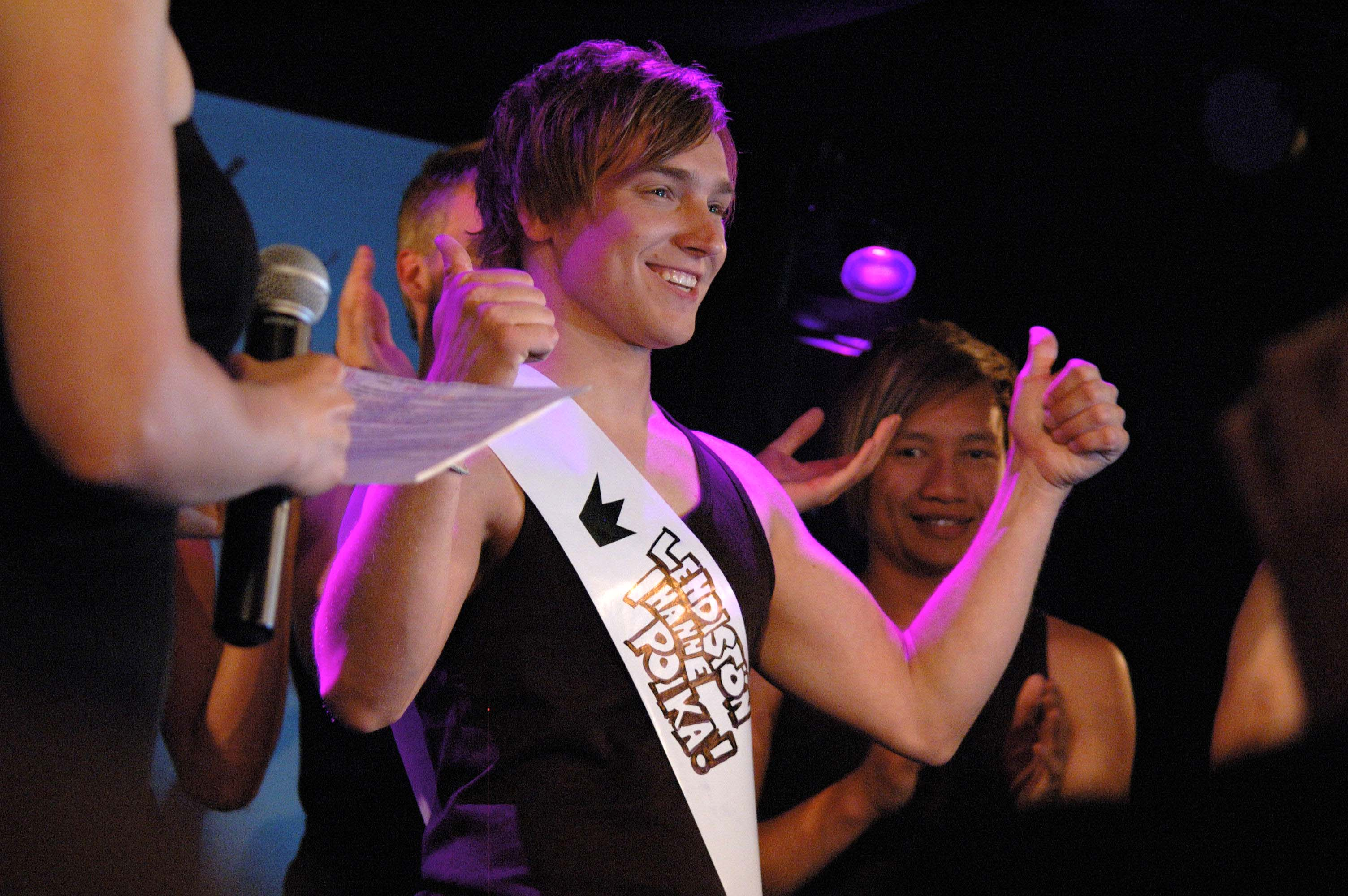
The first Mr. Gay Finland was crowned at DTM in 2010.

Owned by Äkä Oy, DTM was once the largest gay club in Northern Europe. It relocated several times, though until 2020 it was always in the vicinity of Helsinki's downtown area.

The club's music selection consisted mostly of "multilingual Eurovision pop tunes", English-language dance music and techno, as well as a selection of Finnish-language hits by artists such as Kaija Koo. Its live entertainment often featured drag queens and go-go dancers. Each year during Pride Week, the venue hosted the finale of the Mr. Gay Finland competition, which began in 2010. International businesses, such as Nordea and Nokia, sometimes held events and product launches there.

From 2019 to 2020, DTM had a partnership with Klub Kids, a European promoter that organizes continent-wide drag tours. The company produced a series of live shows called Klub Kids Helsinki, which brought RuPaul's Drag Race stars to DTM several times per year. Through Klub Kids, performers including Kameron Michaels, Bob the Drag Queen and Vanessa Vanjie Mateo made appearances.

== History ==
=== Background and early years ===
In the early 1980s, Helsinki did not have any gay restaurants or nightlife venues. Consequently, Seta, the largest LGBT rights organization in Finland, invested in a company called Ravintola Oy Afrodite. With Seta's funding, the firm opened Gay Gambrin, Helsinki's first LGBTQ restaurant, in 1984. Because this venture was successful, Ravintola Oy Afrodite then took over an existing nightclub, Don't Tell Mama, in 1992. Later renamed DTM, Don't Tell Mama was located at the corner of Annankatu and Kansakoulukatu in Helsinki's Kamppi neighborhood. It was the only gay club in Helsinki until 1996, when a venue called Lost & Found opened and began to compete with it for customers. DTM nevertheless maintained its reputation as Finland's flagship LGBT nightlife establishment. In 1997, the club began to host the Miss Drag Queen competition, a regularly recurring drag show that ran until 2013.

=== Iso Roobertinkatu location ===
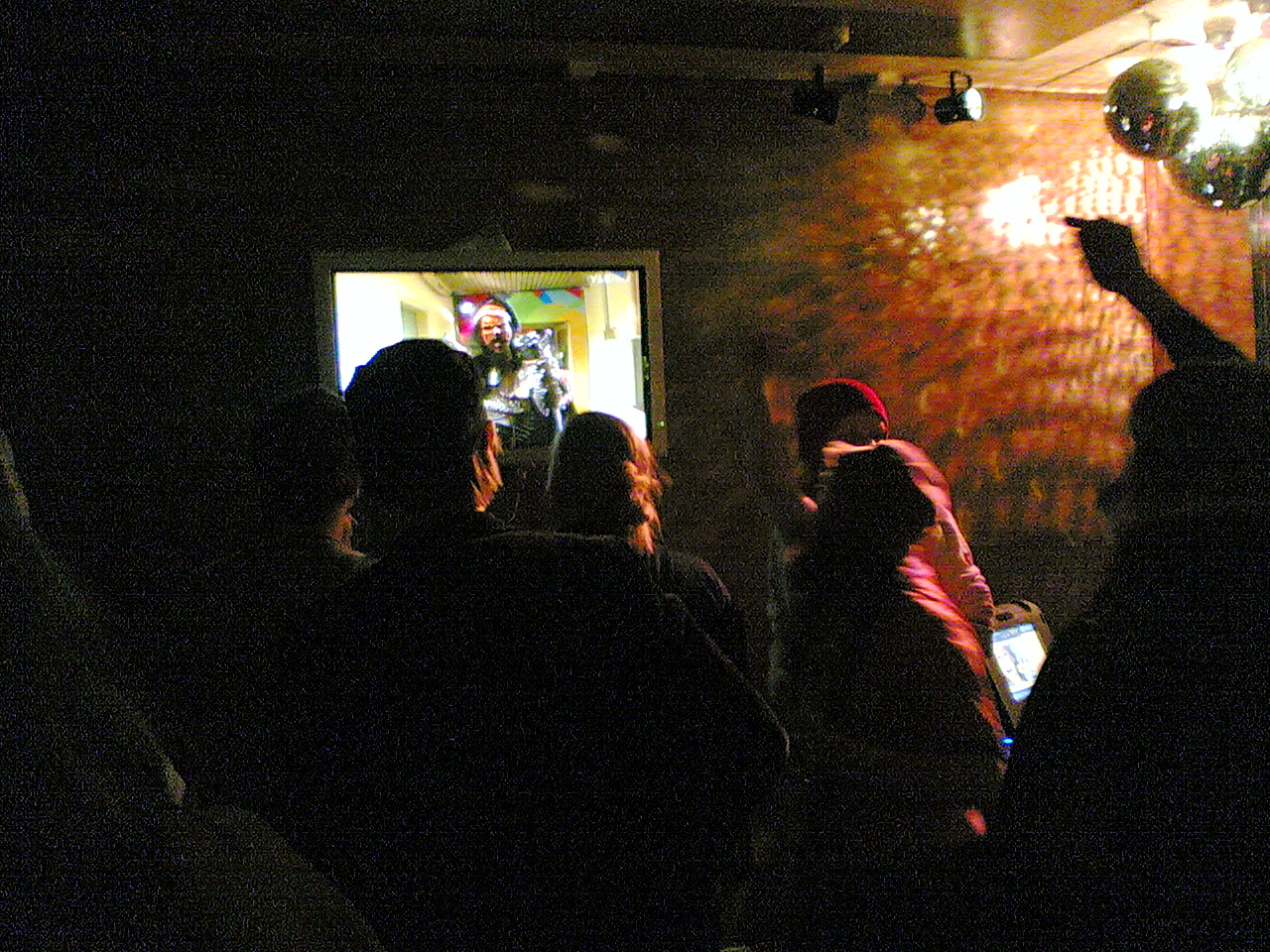
Eurovision Song Contest viewers at DTM's Punavuori location in 2006

In late 2002 or early 2003, DTM moved to Iso Roobertinkatu in Punavuori. There, it occupied a bilevel space that included bars on both floors, a cafe, and a 54-seat terrace for outdoor dining. During this period, DTM was noted for targeting a wider customer base than Hercules, another popular local gay club. Unlike the latter, DTM actively welcomed lesbians and straight clientele in addition to gay men. Its second floor was open to women only on Saturday evenings. According to Riitta Suominen, who managed DTM from 1996 to 2006, all profits the venue made under Ravintola Oy Afrodite's ownership were donated to LGBT charities and initiatives.

In December 2011, American singer Adam Lambert and his then-boyfriend Sauli Koskinen were arrested outside the club, which had ejected them for fighting.

=== Mannerheimintie and conflict with St. George ===
After Ravintola Oy Afrodite went bankrupt in early 2012, Äkä Oy bought DTM and moved the business to Mannerheimintie. The new address, in Kluuvi, was near the Helsinki central railway station. For part of the 2010s, the establishment was managed by Markku Valtanen. In June 2018, a woman was raped in one of the club's toilet stalls. This prompted DTM's management to make structural changes to its bathrooms and to increase signage encouraging patrons to report suspicious activity. According to manager Tomi Häkkinen, the frequency of harassment and other inappropriate behavior in the venue subsequently decreased.

Around the same time, in May 2018, a luxury hotel called St. George opened next door. Four months later, St. George's management lodged a complaint against DTM, stating that loud music from one of its dance floors, the Puma Bar, was audible in three hotel rooms. The City of Helsinki's environmental board investigated the matter in August 2019, concluding that the noise was loud enough to prevent hotel guests from sleeping. In response, DTM modified its sound equipment and indicated that the onus for addressing any remaining concerns should be on the hotel. Nevertheless, the environmental board deemed DTM's adjustments insufficient and notified the club that it would be fined €25,000 if it did not quiet the music by the end of January 2020. DTM challenged the decision in court, but a ruling had not been made by June. In the meantime, the venue had been closed for several months due to the COVID-19 pandemic, though it continued to stream live music shows online.

After consulting with acoustics experts, the club's management learned that the only way to soundproof the Puma Bar enough to shield hotel patrons from the noise would be to reconstruct the area as a room within a room, which would have been prohibitively expensive. Because of this, they decided that the only viable solution was to move. They dissolved the Mannerheimintie rental agreement in late June, announcing together with the establishment's closure that it would reopen pending the procurement of a new space.

=== Teurastamo location, change in management and closure ===
In January 2023, Helsingin Sanomat reported that DTM was scheduled to reopen in the Teurastamo area of Helsinki's Kalasatama neighborhood later that year. The new venue took up residence at Työpajankatu 2a, an industrial hall containing two dance floors and multiple bars.

In early 2025, DTM's general manager left the position for school and was replaced by Carmen Mölder of FlyAF, a short-lived bar that had opened in Punavuori in 2022. Ranneliike.net reported on 16 April 2025 that, according to some event producers, DTM's daily operations were now under the control of FlyAF's ownership. Though no formal announcement had been made, both FlyAF's and DTM's Facebook pages had featured one another's logos since early April. Around the same time, some producers expressed concerns about the continued assurance of safe space principles at DTM and began looking to rehome their events.

On 26 April, Helsingin Sanomat published a story stating that nearly the entire staff of DTM and several resident DJs had resigned (or were about to resign) due to a value conflict between them and the new management duo consisting of Mölder and hospitality manager Ramy Sekaly. Several employees notified DTM's management via email that they would quit if Sekaly remained in his post, citing a value conflict with his appointment. Management replied to the staff that their position was noted and that the club would move forward with its changes.

Some employees and DJs expressed dissatisfaction with other major changes that seemed to be coming to the bar without their input, raising concerns that DTM would cease to be a safe space for the LGBTQ community and transform into another "basic" nightclub. A spokesperson for FlyAF told the paper that the enterprise wanted to keep up with the times and stay relevant, and they wanted to have a new home for the clientele that frequented their now-defunct establishment in Punavuori. Mölder stated intentions to bring new energy and a more international atmosphere to DTM, which would remain a space for the queer community, as well as to expand the club's opening hours.

On 12 June 2025, DTM announced via social media that Äkä Oy had filed for bankruptcy and that the club would permanently shutter its doors.

== Reception ==
In an interview with Gay Star News, Terry Miller of the Tom of Finland Store described DTM as "a great place to go party and feel comfortable with your community", further classifying it as "the closest to a traditional gay club as you're going to get" in Finland. He stated to NewNowNext that the venue is "Helsinki's premier LGBTQ disco/bar". Helsingin Uutiset, a local Helsinki newspaper, called DTM "legendary".

== See also ==
- List of LGBTQ bars
