= Theatron (club) =

Gay bar, dance club, and nightclub complex in Bogotá, Colombia

- Interactive map of Theatron
- Address: Calle 58 Bis No.10 - 32, 110321
- Location: Chapinero, Bogotá, Colombia
- Coordinates: 4.645078707000851°N 74.0635279678298°W
- Type: Night club

Construction
- Opened: February 27, 2002; 24 years ago

Website
- www.portaltheatron.co

Theatron is a building complex in Bogotá, Colombia hosting gay bars, dance clubs, and nightclubs founded in 2002. It is the center of the gay community in Bogotá, located in the central part of the Chapinero locality, the focus of the city's gay scene. The Theatron is composed of 20 rooms and has been described as the largest gay nightclub in Latin America and one of the biggest in the world. It can allow 7000+ people on a Saturday night.

Built in an old movie theater, the complex has 20 different dance floors with different musical styles and atmospheres. In the main room, there is usually a drag show or contest held on Saturdays.
