= Gay day =

Time at an establishment catering to the gay community

A gay day or gay night is a scheduled time at an establishment dedicated to attracting and catering to the gay community. They are typically held at amusement parks and other tourist attractions.

== Bars ==
In many communities there are no gay bars or gay community centers and therefore there are no facilities dedicated to or allowing for socializing amongst the LGBTQ community. The most common form of a gay establishment is a gay bar and in areas without any this is the most common form of non-gay establishment to create a time and a place for gay men and lesbians to congregate outside of private parties or trips to isolated gay pride events. These bars hold a gay night that markets to gay people to dance, drink and meet one another. This is in addition to their friends and supporters also known as the PFLAG community or straight allies in general. The designated gay night is typically a slow night, such as Tuesday or Wednesday nights.

== Amusement parks ==
=== Disney parks ===
At Walt Disney World, an unofficial week-long event for the LGBTQ+ community is held each June. Although the event mainly involves visiting Disney World, related events in the area (conventions, festivals, etc.) also take place. The first documented event was held in 1991 and was attended by approximately 3,000 LGBTQ+ people. Attendance has grown over time; in 2010, the event had approximately 150,000 attendees.

== See also ==
- Gay Days at Walt Disney World
- List of LGBTQ events
