= Hercules (nightclub) =

Gay nightclub in Helsinki, Finland

- Logo

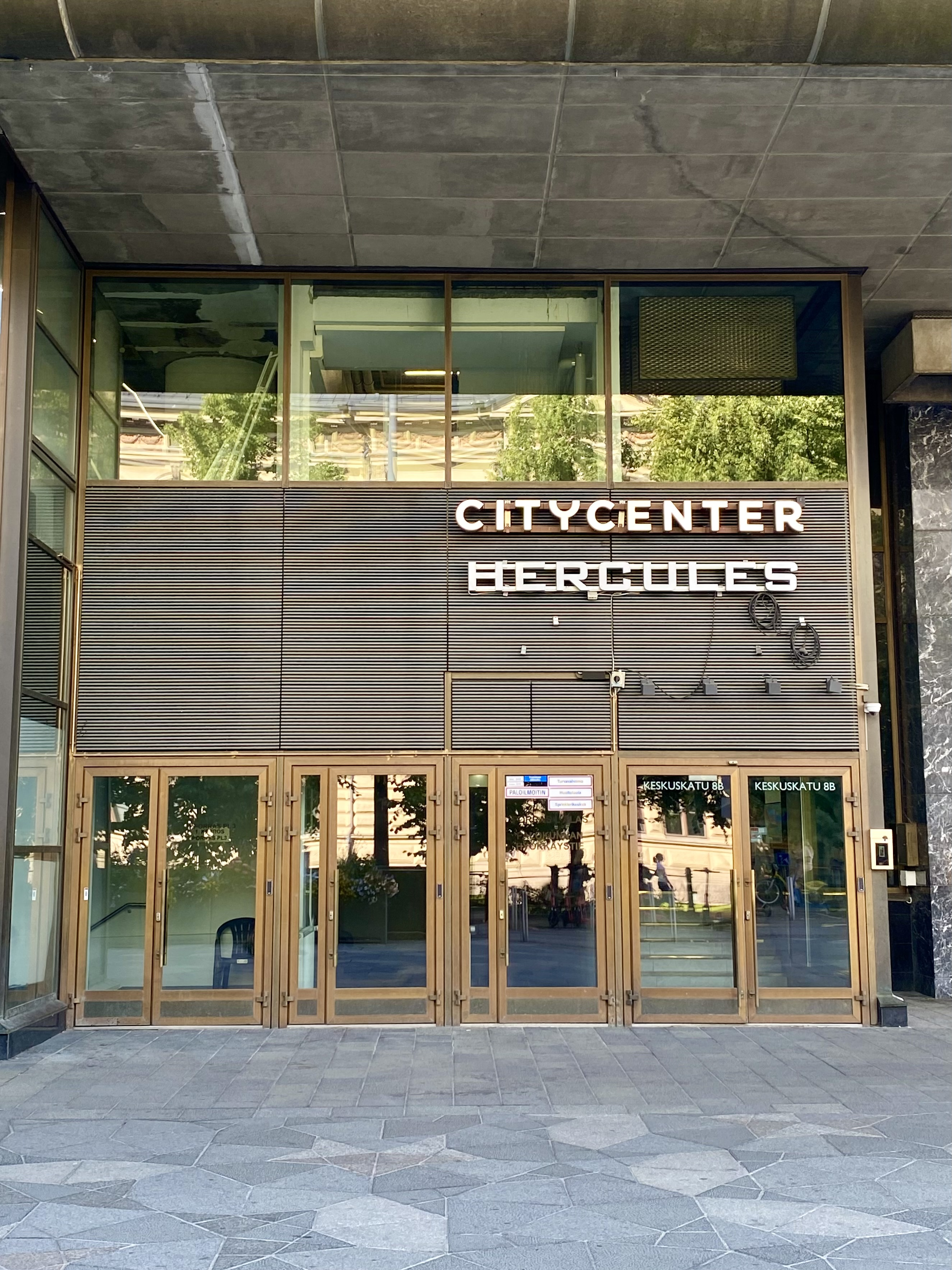
- The bar's entrance in July 2025
- Interactive map of Hercules
- Address: Keskuskatu 8
- Location: Helsinki, Finland
- Coordinates: 60.1701°N 24.9425°E
- Owner: Moek Trading Oy (Erkki Koski and Mika Olkkonen)
- Type: Gay bar; nightclub
- Public transit: Helsinki central railway station (metro)

Construction
- Opened: 30 August 2000

Hercules is a gay bar and nightclub in Helsinki, Finland. Operating since 2000, it is the third establishment opened by Moek Trading Oy. The venue caters primarily to gay men over 30, and its live entertainment features drag queens and strippers. The bar was located in Helsinki's Kamppi neighborhood until the end of 2015, when a hotel took over its space. It subsequently reopened at an address in Etu-Töölö, where it endured a number of events that caused financial strain. That location closed in December 2020, when the building was sold to new owners. The club then reopened across the street from Helsinki's central railway station in October 2021. Critics generally describe Hercules as popular, edgy and welcoming.

== Description ==
Hercules is a gay bar and nightclub that is owned and operated by Moek Trading Oy, a partnership between restaurateurs Erkki Koski and Mika Olkkonen. It attracts a customer base ranging in age from 18 to 60 but caters primarily to gay men over 30, restricting entry to those 24 and older on weekends. The venue's playlists are heavy in Europop, trance music and Finnish folk songs. Through the end of 2020, it regularly hosted drag shows and events featuring strippers. As of 2014, the club was managed by Mikko Ikonen.

To date, Hercules has occupied three spaces in downtown Helsinki. Its second location, on Pohjoinen Rautatiekatu, had a dance floor on the main level, a bar in the basement, and a summer terrace outdoors. Its newest spot, across the street from Helsinki's central railway station, is a single large room featuring a dance floor, two bars, a stage and a lounge. This location, too, has an outdoor terrace. The club shares a lobby, bathroom and coat check with an adjacent bar in the same building. Opened in October 2021, the space is outfitted with ultraviolet lights capable of destroying the SARS-CoV-2 virus. It is open from 9 p.m. to 5 a.m. daily.

== History ==
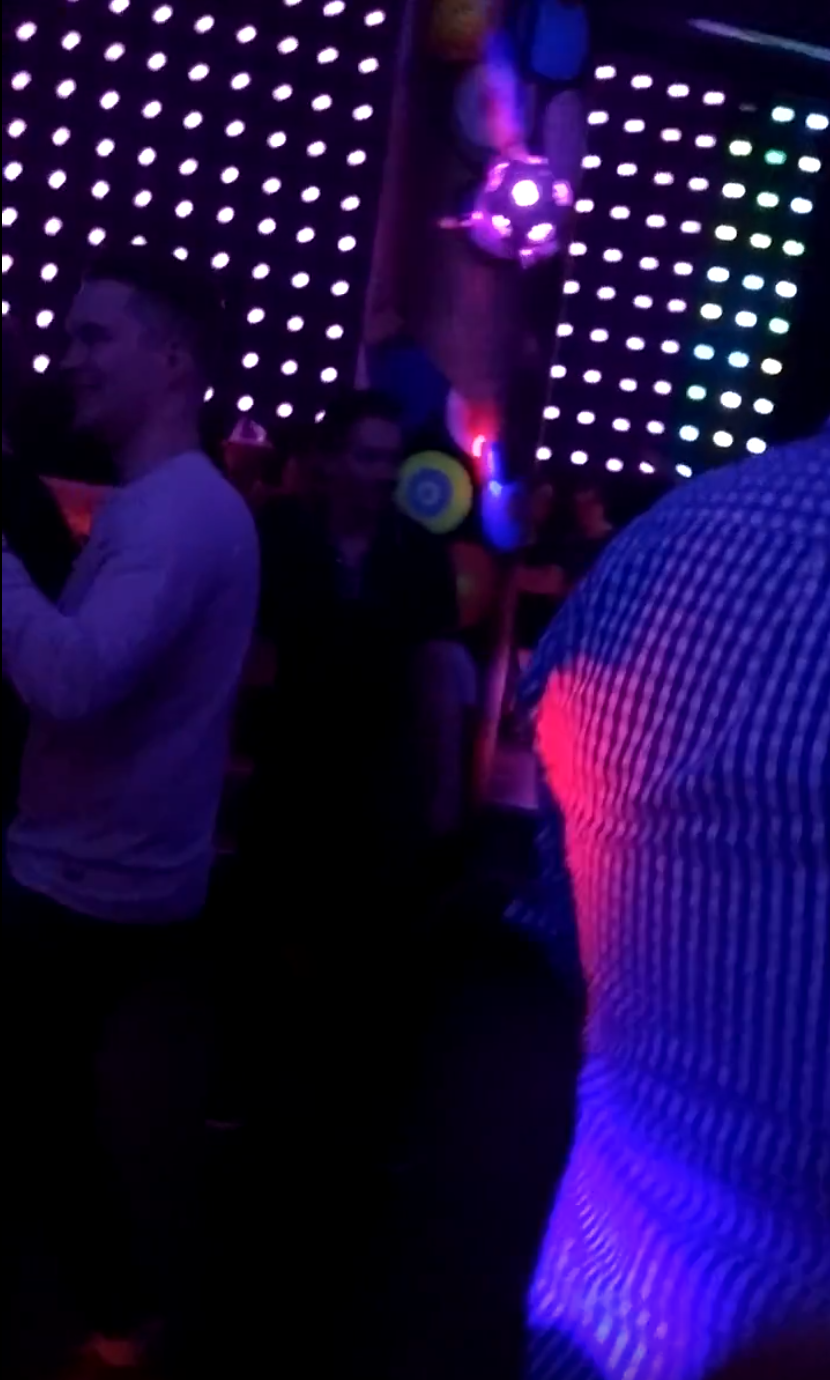
Upper-level dance floor of Hercules' Etu-Töölö location in 2017

In 1994, Koski and Olkkonen opened their first gay bar, Café Escale. This was followed by a second establishment, Mann's Street, in 1998. They received orders to vacate the building that housed Escale in what Koski described as an incident of homophobic discrimination, which ultimately led to Escale's closure in early 2001. While working through that situation, Koski and Olkkonen opened a new nightclub, Hercules, on 30 August 2000. They temporarily closed Mann's Street for renovation around the same time, directing their customer base to try out the new venue. Hercules became popular almost immediately. Shortly after opening, it lost its liquor license for a week when it was caught operating above capacity. Koski and Olkkonen then repurposed the kitchen and staff areas, which increased the capacity by 100 customers.

From its inception through the end of 2015, Hercules was located on Lönnrotinkatu in Helsinki's Kamppi neighborhood, where it contained a dark room. Koski and Olkkonen had the original space remodeled in 2013. The club was forced to relocate at the beginning of 2016, when Hotel St. George moved into its space. For the next five years, it operated at an address on Pohjoinen Rautatiekatu in Etu-Töölö.

Those years were fraught with financial difficulties. From November 2016 through April 2017, while Koski was hospitalized for a stroke, the club's manager embezzled approximately €61,500 in cash, a crime for which he was convicted in February 2020. In April 2017, Hercules received public backlash after a racially charge post appeared on its Facebook page. In a request for comment from the press, manager Antti Seppälä stated that several people had access to the venue's social media accounts and that the post must have been published to the club's profile in error. Koski said that it did not represent the views of the business. The venue then lost €60,000 one summer due to a pricing error on its outdoor terrace, where premium sparkling wine was accidentally sold for €3.50 less than its wholesale price. In spring 2019, Hercules was shuttered for two months following an incident that caused extensive water damage.

The establishment's operation was irregular throughout 2020 due to the COVID-19 pandemic, which caused further strain. After closing to customers, it converted its dance floor into a TV studio, from which it hosted live-streamed talk shows, drag revues, concerts and theatre events for several months. By September 2020, Hercules had reopened and launched a new annual competition called Queer of the Year. Hercules was made to relinquish its Etu-Töölö premises in December 2020, when the building's ownership changed hands.

In October 2021, the club reopened in Makkaratalo, on the corner of Keskuskatu and Kaivokatu, across the street from Helsinki's central railway station. The new space is shared with Baarikärpänen, another nightlife venue that was evicted from the Pohjoinen Rautatiekatu building at the end of 2020.

== Reception ==
Passport Magazine dubbed Hercules the most popular gay club in Helsinki. Will Stroude of Attitude characterized it as a place of "Euro-pop, vodka and a mixed crowd of edgy Finnish locals". The venue's GayCities.com listing reads: "Hercules ... is just as packed, fun and raucous as Helsinki's other gay disco, dtm, and can even be a fair bit raunchier." After DTM, often billed as the largest gay club in Northern Europe, entered into a state of temporary closure in June 2020, Finnish news service Yle described Hercules as the largest one in the Nordic region. The club's Yatra review characterizes its client base as "open-minded and friendly", adding that patrons "can let [their] guard down and have an excellent time".

== See also ==
- List of LGBTQ bars
