= Café 't Mandje =

Bar in Amsterdam, Netherlands

Coordinates: 52°22′29″N 4°54′4″E

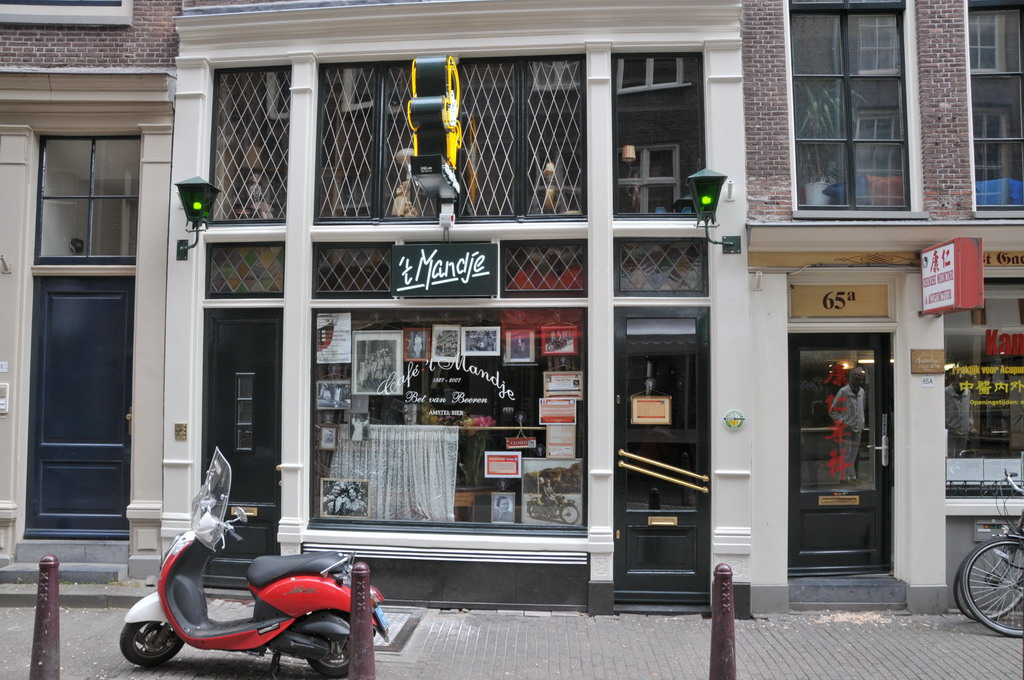
Café 't Mandje at Zeedijk

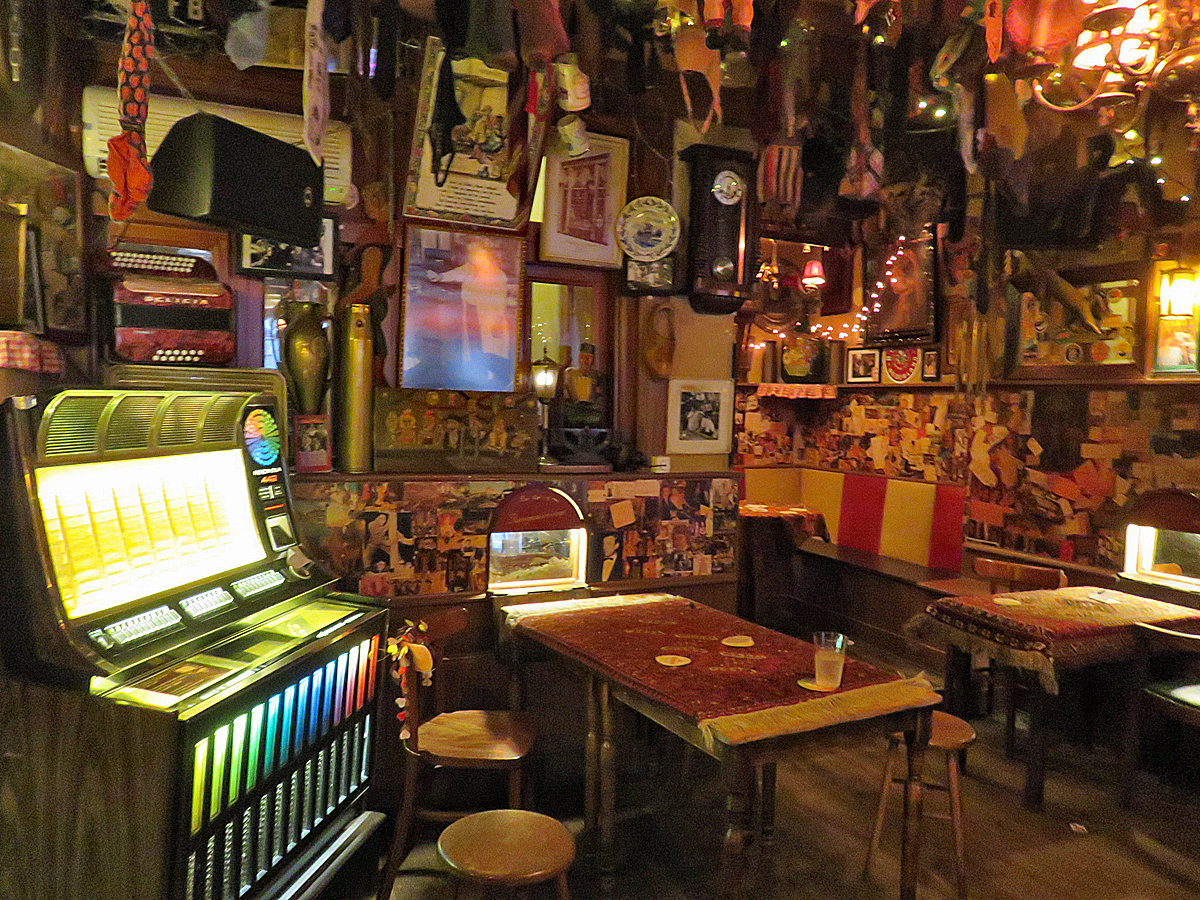
Impression of the interior

Café 't Mandje is a bar in Amsterdam, Netherlands. It is located in Zeedijk street and was opened in 1927 by Bet van Beeren, herself a lesbian. The Amsterdam Museum holds a small replica of 't Mandje.

't Mandje is often presented as the first gay bar in the Netherlands, but that is not correct: in Amsterdam there were already some gay bars in the first decade of the 20th century. Also, 't Mandje was not specifically a bar for gay men, but more of a tolerant place where prostitutes, pimps, seamen and lesbian women came together.

== History ==
Café 't Mandje, on Zeedijk 63 in the historic heart of Amsterdam, was opened in 1927 by lesbian Bet van Beeren. After her death in 1967, her youngest sister Greet continued the business until it closed in 1982. However, the bar and its entire interior was preserved by her ever since and could be visited upon request. Just before her death in August 2007, she took the initiative to have the bar reopened. The bar has been open under the management of her niece Diana since 29 April 2008. Orlando Lansdorf used to work at 't Mandje as a barman.

== See also ==
- List of LGBTQ bars
