= Cotton Street, Shreveport, Louisiana =

Street in Shreveport, Louisiana, US

Coordinates: 32.510313°N 93.747181°W

Cotton Street runs along the south side of Downtown Shreveport. One of the oldest gay bars in Louisiana, the Korner Lounge, has been continuously operating since 1951 at the corner of Cotton and Louisiana Avenue. It is the second oldest in the state. On Marshall Street near the terminus of Cotton Street is the largest of Shreveport's gay and lesbian bars, Central Station. This club is located in the Central Railroad Station of Shreveport, built in 1909, and features a country and western bar, a dance club, a video bar, and a drag queen showroom upstairs.
