= Teurastamo =

Public space in Helsinki, Finland

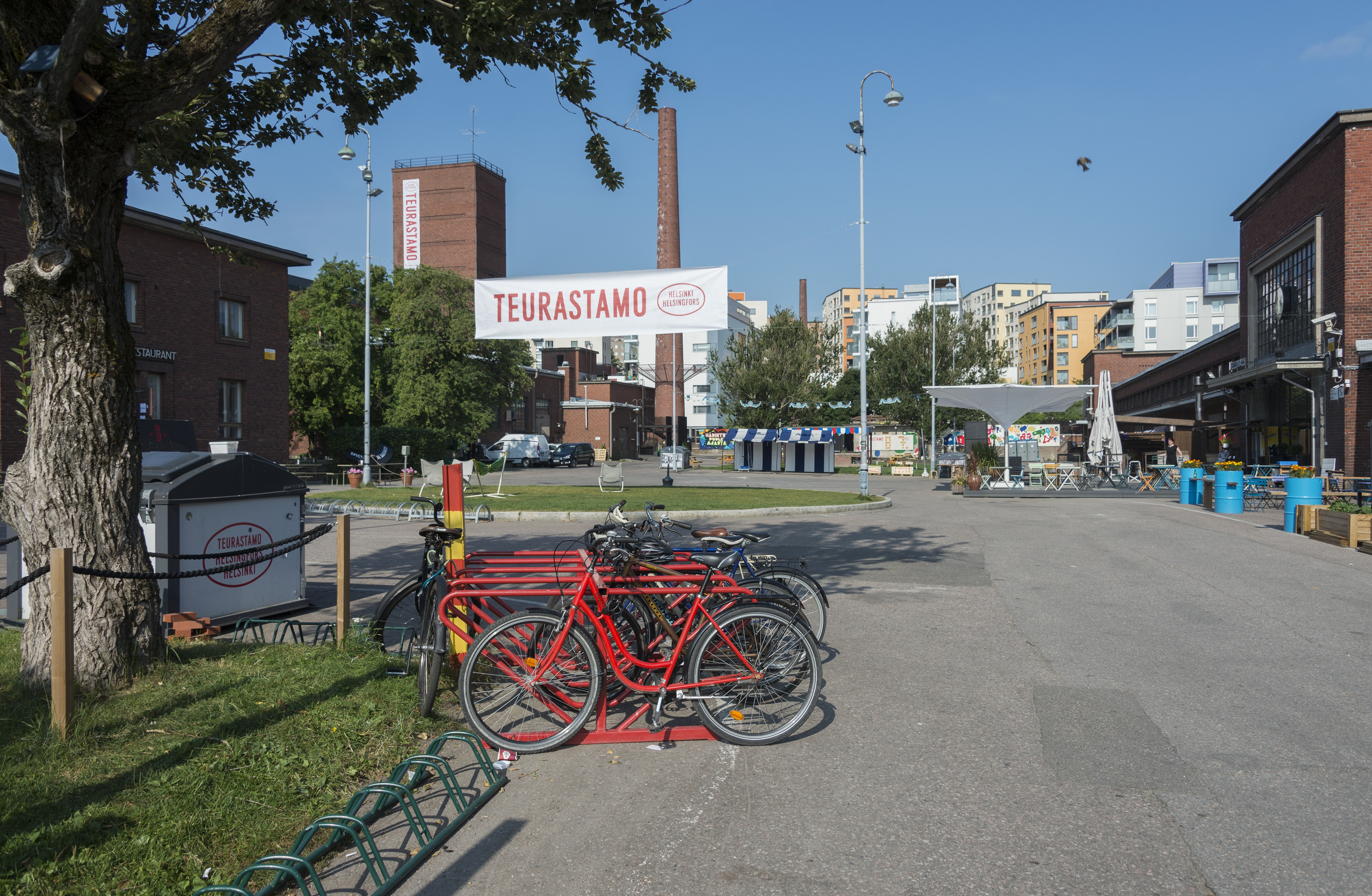
- Teurastamo area in July 2016

- Location within Helsinki Location within Finland
- Etymology: literally meaning "slaughterhouse"

General information
- Status: General public space
- Location: Hermanni, Työpajankatu 2 A, Helsinki, Finland
- Coordinates: 60.18979°N 24.97179°E
- Opened: 1933 (as slaughterhouse); 2012 (as public area)
- Owner: Tukkutori

Design and construction
- Architect: Bertel Liljequist

Teurastamo (Finnish pronunciation: [ˈteu̯rɑstɑmo]; literally meaning "abattoir") is a public area managed by Tukkutori in Hermanni, Helsinki, Finland, which hosts events, restaurant and bar operations and other urban culture. The area is located along the Työpajankatu street near the Kalasatama area.

The name of the area, Teurastamo, is derived from the city's former slaughterhouse, designed by architect Bertel Liljequist and opened in 1933. The slaughterhouse closed in 1992 and has since housed smaller butchers, bakeries and other food and flower businesses. The area was officially opened to the general public in the autumn of 2012.

Teurastamo is run by more than a dozen active players, from distilleries to restaurants and coffee roasters. Notable restaurants in the area include the Restaurant Kellohalli, the Restaurant Palema, and Roslund, the "Gate of Teurastamo", known for its burgers. Teurastamo also includes a yard and barbecue for free use all year round by the townspeople, a bicycle repair point, a sack-growing area and a sauna for rent. A variety of free events are held in Teurastamo's yard, such as picnics, a farmers market-style markets and flea markets.

In autumn 2023, the LGBTQ nightclub DTM, which had closed at its previous location on Mannerheimintie, opened at Teurastamo.
