= Orlando Lansdorf =

Dutch drag queen and HIV activist (1965–2021)

- Born: 1965; Paramaribo, Suriname
- Died: 6 March 2021 (aged 55)
- Occupations: Drag queen, HIV activist

Orlando Lansdorf (1965 – 6 March 2021) was a Surinamese-Dutch drag queen and HIV activist who received media attention in the Netherlands.

Landsdorf was born in Paramaribo, Suriname. He moved to Veghel in the Netherlands. Landsdorf was the father of two children with a lesbian mother. In the 1990s, he was active in Safe Seks Guerrilla, a performance group to raise awareness of HIV, and to promote safe sex. Later, he was diagnosed HIV positive himself. He worked as a bartender at Café 't Mandje on the Zeedijk in Amsterdam. Lansdorf died in his sleep on 6 March 2021, aged 55.
