= Disneyland Paris Pride =

LGBTQ event at Disneyland Paris

- Type: Private
- Headquarters: Marne-la-Vallée, France
- Number of locations: Disneyland Park (2020); Walt Disney Studios Park (2019)
- Website: https://pride.disneylandparis.com

The Disneyland Paris Pride party is the official LGBT pride celebration held annually at Disneyland Paris. Originally called Magical Pride Party, it is the first Disney-sponsored Gay Day at a Disney park. The party is usually held every first Saturday of June, similar to the Gay Days held in Walt Disney World and Disneyland.

== Events ==
=== 2019 - Magical Pride ===
The inaugural party was held at the Walt Disney Studios Park on June 1, 2019 from 8:00 PM to 2:00 AM. The private party included access to select attractions, Disney Character Meet and Greets, a "Magical March of Diversity Parade", DJs, live music performances with "Karaoke Theatre Experiences", as well as themed photo locations. Entertainment included Years & Years lead singer Olly Alexander, Boy George, and acts with significant LGBTQ fanbase like Corine and Sindykatz.

=== 2020 onwards - Disneyland Paris Pride ===
The 2020 party was to be held at Disneyland Park on June 6, 2020 from 8:00 PM to 2:00 AM. This would have marked the first time a Disney-sponsored Pride celebration would have been held inside a Castle park. The event would have featured live performances, dance parties, a Disney lip-sync-along, the return of the "Magical March of Diversity Parade", Disney Character Meet and Greets, access to selected attractions, and many more. However, due to the COVID-19 pandemic, the 2020 Disneyland Paris Pride event was cancelled, with the next event taking place in June 2021.

The 2022 Disneyland Paris Pride event took place on 11 June 2022. The June 2023 event featured performances by Calum Scott and Jenifer The 2024 event held on 29 June included a festive parade float with Mickey, Minnie other Disney characters dressed up in Pride colours. For the first time, 2024 Pride was not a separately ticketed event, but rather part of general admission.

== Reactions ==
Hugo Martin of the Los Angeles Times wrote that the event "marks a dramatic shift for the world's biggest theme park operator", noting that The Walt Disney Company has previously allowed independent groups to stage gay-themed events in its parks in the United States, Japan and China but never participated themselves. Nathan Tunnah, a travel consultant, stated that he believes that Disney taking over the LGBT celebration would bring more people from across Europe to them each year. Jacob Ogles of The Advocate expressed that the event signified another step in Disney's evolution of acceptance of their LGBT fans. Many conservative organisations which previously criticised Disney for their pro-LGBT actions stayed silent on the announcement.

== See also ==
- Gay Days at Walt Disney World
