= Gay Days at Walt Disney World =

Unofficial annual LGBTQ event at Disney World

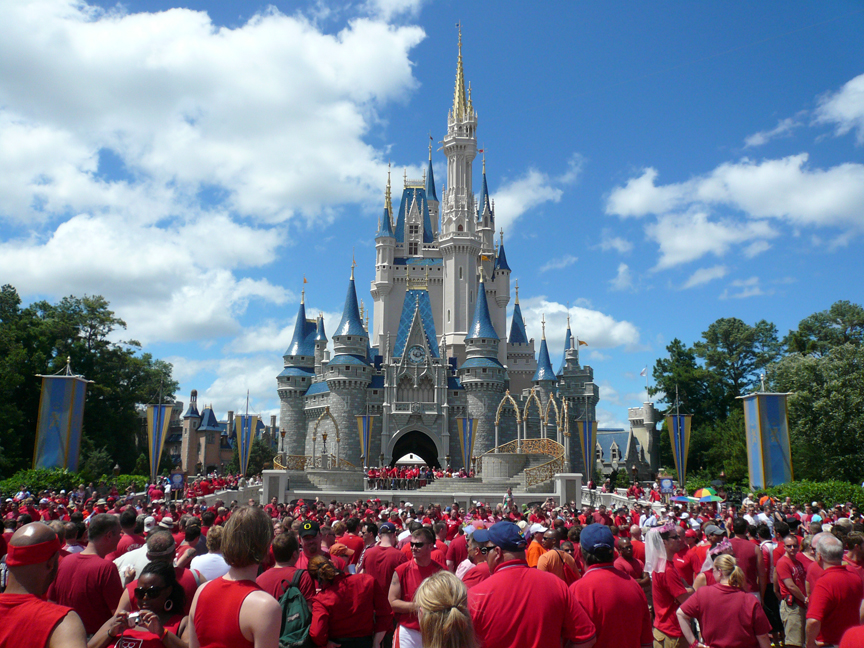
People attending Gay Day dressed in red, in front of the Cinderella Castle

Disney World Gay Days is a loosely organized event where lesbian, gay, bisexual, transgender, and queer (LGBTQ) individuals, their families, friends and supporters go to Walt Disney World on a week-long event each year. It is held on the first Saturday in June (with numerous other events in the area during the preceding week).

== History ==
The first documented event, in June 1991, had 3,000 LGBTQ+ people from central Florida going to area theme parks on one day wearing red shirts to make their presence more visible. By 1995, the event had grown to 10,000 gays and lesbians traveling for the gay day at Disney. As of 2010 approximately 150,000 LGBT people, their families, friends and supporters attended the six-day gathering (including various pool parties, conventions, festivals, a business expo, activities for kids, etc.) with 20,000 to 30,000 going to Disney on the final day.

The popularity of the event is seen by some attendees as a way of "reclaiming" normal joys of childhood lost to homophobia in their earlier years. Growth in attendance also reflects the growing number of LGBT families with children as well as increasing number of LGBT marriages, since Disney World is also a top honeymoon destination. A local Doubletree resort has dubbed itself the "official" hotel for the event, with convention space rented to various businesses (bathroom remodelers, gourmet cooking suppliers, sex toys, etc.) and organizations (free health tests, vaccinations, etc.) pitching to attendees.

== Equivalent events at Anaheim Disneyland ==
In the 1990s, third party organizers and travel agencies rented Disneyland and Walt Disney World to hold events after the park's official hours. One such event was 'Gay Night' held by the Odyssey Tours travel agency, who purportedly donated proceeds to the Aid for AIDS charity. It was later found out that Odyssey Tours' was only making token donations to the charitable organization, and attendance dimmed as a result. In 1998, Odyssey Tours cancelled 'Gay Night'. In response, 'Gay Days' began being celebrated at Disneyland Anaheim the very same year, inspired by the unofficial event held at Disney World with the same name. According to Gay Days' organizers, the inaugural Gay Days Anaheim saw around 2,500 visitors, and as of 2023, they estimate that more than 30,000 people participate in Gay Days Anaheim each year. In 2021, organizers moved the annual Gay Days from October to September. Usually, the event is hosted by separate parks on separate days, with Disneyland hosting on Saturday and Disney California Adventure hosting on Sunday.

On April 13, 2023, it was announced that Disneyland would be holding its first official "Pride Nite" on June 13 and 15, 2023, as part of the Disneyland After Dark event series. This event comes 25 years after the first unofficial Gay Days.

== Criticism ==
Gay Days have attracted criticism from religious groups. While Disney does not sanction Gay Days (and officially tells employees to treat it as any other summer day), conservative Christian groups accuse Disney of not doing anything to stop the event. The Southern Baptist Convention boycotted Disney for eight years. The Florida Family Association flew banner planes one year warning families of gay events at Disney that weekend, citing emails from people nationwide who unknowingly booked their vacation during Gay Days. Janet Porter, president of the Christian organization "Faith 2 Action", is highly critical of the event. She encouraged families to re-think visiting Walt Disney World. She told families to expect to see "cross-dressing men parading public displays of perversion" during their visit.

== See also ==
- Disneyland Paris Pride
