= Sunee Plaza =

Area of Pattaya, Thailand

- Interactive map of Sunee Plaza
- Location: Pattaya, Thailand
- Coordinates: 12.9226545°N 100.87291°E

Sunee Plaza is an area in Pattaya known for gay nightlife. It is just off Soi V.C., which intersects Second Road in south Pattaya. It is built around two parallel streets, with a cross-linking street. All the buildings in the plaza are owned by Madame Sunee, a Thai national, and are leased to the various businesses. In the past, Sunee Plaza had been referred to as "the heart of the extreme city."; however in recent years, the Plaza hosts only a few bars. As of 2019, Most of the gay life in Pattaya has now relocated to Jomtien Complex.

== Businesses ==
The first gay bar at Sunee Plaza was open in 1996 and carried the name Crazy Pub. Soon behind it Sunee Plaza Bar opened, as did Topman Nightclub, the first gogo bar. (Note: As of 2019 this building hosts the Irish pub and Jazz hotel.) In 2010 in Sunee Plaza more than 50 institutions focused on LGBT including beer bars, go-go bars, host bars cafes, restaurants and budget hotels. Sunee Plaza at that time boasted the largest collection of gay venues in one location in Thailand. As of 2019, the quantity of gay establishments in Sunee Plaza has decreased significantly. Now there are fewer than a dozen beer bars, a few restaurants, and only one hotel. Additional services includes small shops, hairdressing salons, taxi services, travel agencies, and a few restaurants. The main reasons for closing gay institutions in Pattaya:

- toughening of business rules in Thailand in general after the military junta came to power in 2014;
- city administration desire to improve the image of Pattaya as a family destination;
- competition from online dating mobile apps;
- Recent influx of Arab-owned businesses on Soi 17 and in the Sunee Plaza area;
- rental increases by the owner of Sunee Plaza, Madame Sunee.

== Police raids ==
The police regularly conduct checks of the Sunee Plaza institutions. In July, 2008, July, 2010 and March, 2013 during raids underage males involved in gogo bars as dancers were found. During a raid in July, 2008 one of the minors detained by police was only 8 years old. During raids conducted in July, 2008, October, 2009, January, 2011 barstaff were found to be under the influence of illegal narcotics, based on blood analysis.
