= Vere Street Coterie =

Group of men arrested for sodomy

Coordinates: 51°30′49″N 0°7′2″W

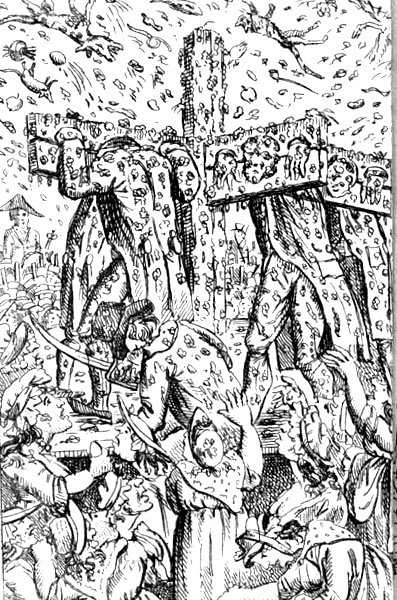
The Vere Street Gang at the pillory in 1810

The Vere Street Coterie was a group of men arrested at a molly house in Vere Street, London in 1810 for sodomy and attempted sodomy. Eight men were eventually convicted. Two of them were hanged (as per the then still extant sodomy laws promulgated by Henry VIII in 1534) and six were pilloried for this offence. Along with Oscar Wilde's imprisonment for a similar offence, this episode was one of the major events in gay history in England during the 19th century.

== Establishment of the White Swan ==
The White Swan on Vere Street in London was established as a molly house in early 1810 by two men, James Cook and Yardley (full name unknown).

== Police raid ==
The club had been operating for less than six months when, on 8 July 1810, it was raided by the Bow Street police. Twenty-seven men were arrested, but the majority of them were released (perhaps as a result of bribes), and eight were tried and convicted.

== Convicts pilloried in the Haymarket ==
Six of the convicted men, who had been found guilty of attempted sodomy, were pilloried in the Haymarket on 27 September that year. The crowds who turned out to witness the scene were violent and unruly, throwing various objects (including rotten fish, dead cats, "cannonballs" made of mud, and vegetables) at the convicted men. The women in the crowd were reported as being particularly vicious. The city provided a guard force of 200 armed constables, half of them mounted and the other half on foot, to protect the men from even worse mistreatment.

== Hangings ==
A man and a boy, John Hepburn (46) and Thomas White (16, a drummer boy), were convicted of the act of sodomy, despite not being present at the White Swan during the night of the raid. They were hanged at Newgate Prison on 7 March 1811.

== Alleged same-sex marriage ==
Vere Street Coterie is also known in connection with alleged same-sex marriages there, performed by Reverend John Church.

== Narrative by Robert Holloway ==
The history of the White Swan and the Vere Street Coterie were related by the lawyer Robert Holloway in The Phoenix of Sodom in 1813.

== Representations in popular culture ==
In 2022, filmmakers Brian Fairbairn and Karl Eccleston represented the scandal indirectly in their short film Tommies by looking at the incident from the perspective of the wives of the men involved.

== See also ==
- Cleveland Street scandal
