= Qiao Qiao =

Chinese singer

Qiao Qiao (Chinese: 乔 乔; pinyin: Qiáo Qiáo; born c. 1980) is a Chinese singer.

The first openly lesbian artist in China, she released her first single called "Ai Bu Fen" (爱不分), which translates as "Love does not discriminate", in 2006. A video clip for the song showed two ballerinas in love, but social conventions would not allow them to kiss. The government "made no effort to suppress the song".

In 2000, she opened the first lesbian bar in China (located in Beijing), Maple Bar.

She was the first guest on Tong Xing Xiang Lian (Gay Connections), a one-hour video webcast that debuted in 2007 on PhoenixTV.com.
