= Chances Bar =

Former nightclub in Houston, Texas

Coordinates: 29°44′42″N 95°23′35″W

- Defunct: November 20, 2010
- Headquarters: 1100 Westheimer, Houston, Texas, U.S.
- Area served: Montrose, Houston
- Website: web.archive.org/*/https://www.chancesbar.com

Chances Bar was a nightclub in the Montrose neighborhood of Houston, Texas, which catered to the local LGBTQ community, particularly lesbians. According to the Chances Bar Tribute Site, the bar opened in August 1994. The space had been owned by the Vastakis family since it was Charlie's Coffee Shop in the 1970s.

== History ==
Chances operated as a lesbian bar for sixteen years and was considered a "nightlife staple" in Montrose. In April 2006, the bar underwent a remodel following a fire. In 2010, the Vastakis family got out of the bar management business and into property development. The property was put on the market in July and the business closed on November 20. The owner said of the closing:

"Chances lasted a lot longer than we though it would. It's been a great time... It's a natural evolution for us all in the family. I was spear-fishing with my 12-year-old son in Greece and he said, "You know Dad, we never get to just hang out. You are always at the bar working," and so we decided to change the direction of our business plan."

The site was slated to become a "high-end restaurant, with a superstar chef". Chances held a closing party, for which its marquee displayed "Thanks for the mammaries".
