= Bet van Beeren =

Dutch bar owner

- Born: Elisabeth Maria van Beeren; 12 February 1902; Amsterdam, the Netherlands
- Died: 16 July 1967 (aged 65); Amsterdam, the Netherlands
- Other names: Queen of the Zeedijk
- Occupation: bar owner
- Years active: 1927–1967
- Known for: Café 't Mandje

Bet van Beeren (12 February 1902—16 July 1967) was a bar owner in Amsterdam. While hers was not the first bar that allowed LGBT persons to openly associate, the fact that she was openly lesbian, and accepting of a very diverse clientele, led her establishment to be one of the most known. In 2017, she was honored by the city of Amsterdam when a canal bridge was renamed in her honor.

== Early life ==
Elisabeth Maria van Beeren was born on 12 February 1902 in the Jordaan neighborhood of Amsterdam to Maria Johanna (née Brants) and Johannes Hendrik van Beeren. She was the oldest daughter and one of thirteen children of the couple. Her father worked in street construction and her mother ran a boarding house and delivered fish and vegetables by car around the neighborhood. Bet's education ended at middle school because her family needed her to work.

== Career ==
Van Beeren went to work in a canning factory on Haarlemmerweg, quickly working her way up to foreman, but she didn't like the job and the work was dangerous. She lost two fingertips while working and after a fight with her boss, quit and went to work for her uncle at his pub, Amstelstroom, where she had previously worked part-time. She also rode around town in leather clothing on her motorcycle and sold fish. In 1927, she bought the bar with loans from the Oranjeboom Brewery and thereafter, was always loyal to that brand of beer, though other breweries later tried to gain her patronage. It was very unusual for a woman to own a business at that time, especially on the rough seawall area where it was located. She renamed the pub Café 't Mandje (The Basket Café), because her mother brought the food in every day in a basket.

Van Beeren ran an open establishment where lesbians and gays could freely associate as long as there was no kissing, which would have violated the vice laws and have cost her her liquor license. Her mixed clientele included artists, intellectuals, pimps and prostitutes, sailors, and Major Bosshardt, the disapproving head of the Salvation Army. Van Beeren was flamboyant, craving the spotlight, and often dressed in a sailor suit or leathers, entertaining her clients with singing and dancing. She was openly lesbian, though she could entertain wealthy men if it would put meat or pastries on her family table. She drank a lot, some reports were 40 bottles of beer a day, and could curse like a sailor.

Making a lot of money from the pub, van Beeren was known for her charitable works, helping the poor, children and the elderly. She also claimed to have paid for one of the crosses atop the Nicholaas Church. Among her other legendary deeds, she allowed the bar to be used as an arms depot for the Dutch resistance during the Nazi occupation of the Netherlands. While homosexual men became targets of the Germans, van Beeren's pub was off-limits to German troops because of its reputation as a red-light district establishment. The use of the term owl for heterosexuals has been attributed to a device van Beeren used when the bar was being raided or when homophobic patrols were sweeping the area. She had a light installed in a plaster owl, which was lit to warn her customers. She hung neckties and souvenirs from patrons from the ceiling, held dances on Queen's Day where same sex couples could dance together, and on Fridays would let the Salvation Army band come in to raise funds for charity.

== Death and legacy ==
Van Beeren died of liver disease on 16 July 1967. She was laid in state on the billiard table of the pub for several days before her burial on 20 July at the Nieuwe Oosterbegraafplaats in Amsterdam. Greet, van Beeren's younger sister, continued to operate the business until 1982, when she closed it because of the heroin trade expansion in the area. Some of the items from the bar were incorporated into the Amsterdam Museum in 1998, but for the most part, the building remained untouched until Greet, shortly before her death, sold it to her niece, Diana van Laar. Van Laar completed a renovation of the pub and reopened it on 2 April 2008. In 2017, a bridge spanning the Oudezijds Achterburgwal canal between the Korte Stormsteeg and Korte Niezel streets was renamed on the pub's 90th anniversary to honor van Beeren in a symbolic representation of her building bridges in the community between diverse groups.
