= John Church (minister) =

John Church (1780 – c. 1835) was an Independent minister who was most famous for his involvement in the homosexual scandal of the Vere Street Coterie. He is claimed by some as the first openly ‘gay’ ordained Christian minister in England. Contemporary rumours about this are unproveable one way or the other, though circumstantial evidence may suggest that his "inordinate affections which led me into error" could be referring to homosexuality.

== Life ==
=== Early life ===
A foundling discovered as a toddler barely able to walk on the steps of St John's Church Clerkenwell (hence his name) or St Andrew's Church Holborn, Church's parents are unknown. He was sent to the Foundling Hospital and spent his first six years in the care of a woman at Hadlow, near Tonbridge in Kent, before returning to the hospital. There he remained, receiving a rudimentary education, including how to read but not how to write, until he was indentured at the age of 10 to a carver and gilder in Great Portland Street. This was broken off after only eight years due to a quarrel with the master but, though he complained of poverty during this time, he managed some self-education and acquired a small personal library.

=== Early preaching ===
Church then moved from job to job and, on 22 March 1801, married the daughter of a Mr Elliott of Hampshire at the (Swedenborgian) New Church in the Strand. He may have been introduced to Swedenborgianism by his first employer, despite claiming to have regularly attended Anglican services during his apprenticeship. Becoming more openly an evangelical dissenter, from about 1801 he attended Itinerant Society meetings, a few years later began to preach publicly and organise a Sunday school. In 1807 he was baptised at the Grafton Street congregation under the ministry of its minister, the Revd Richard Burnham. Tried and approved as a preacher there, he admired William Huntington's high Calvinism, though it is unclear that this led, as his detractors claimed, to his practising Huntingdon's "practical antinomianism" or showing wanton disregard for accepted Christian morality.

Church almost immediately accepted a permanent appointment at an Independent chapel at Banbury, Oxfordshire, being ordained on 15 September 1807 before a group of Baptist and Independent ministers, but had this office curtailed the following year as a result of rumours that he was sodomising young men in the congregation. He moved back to London, to the Grub Street congregation, but despite admitting that he had acted "imprudently" he refused to submit to their investigation of these allegations and moved on to many and various other short-term preaching appointments before joining the Obelisk Chapel, St George's Fields, as its regular minister.

=== Vere Street ===
In the course of 1813 rumours began to spread in the Weekly Dispatch and other pamphlets and broadsides connecting Church with the White Swan (a well-known homosexual brothel or 'gay bar' in modern parlance, in Vere Street, Clare Market), saying that Church was its chaplain and had performed mock marriage ceremonies for its male customers subsequently recognised by some modern historians as same sex marriages. Church denied this connection with Vere Street, claiming that it was propaganda by his clerical opponents and successfully taking legal action to prevent the Dispatch from publishing further reports. Attempted prosecutions against him for sodomy failed and his following did not decline – indeed, in 1814 he founded a new chapel, later known as the Obelisk Tabernacle, designed to accommodate larger numbers. His first wife died, having borne him 4 children, and he remarried not long afterwards to a wife of unknown name (though she is thought to have been the proprietor of a ladies' seminary at Hammersmith).

=== Imprisonment ===
In 1816 Church states that he dreamed of seeing a number of scorpions crawling about the floor of his chapel and being able to kill all but two of them "which fled to the very seat that was occupied by ******* and another". Soon afterwards, on 26 September, he was indicted at the Surrey assizes, Croydon, for attempted sodomy. His accuser was Adam Foreman, a 19-year-old apprentice potter in his congregation who alleged that Church had entered his room one night, placed a hand upon his genitals, and feigned his mistress's voice, upon which Foreman claimed to have fled. The trial was a cause célèbre, lasting to 17 August the following year and returning a guilty verdict and sentencing Church to two years' imprisonment. Upon the verdict, Church was burned in effigy by a large and violent crowd outside the Obelisk Tabernacle. During the 730 days he served of his sentence at Newington and Horsemonger Lane gaols, he was often in great anguish according to his autobiography, but he received many visitors, had access to books, retained many of his followers (especially women) and had his four children cared for. He soon recommenced regular services on release, including preaching to more than 1000 people on the evening of his release.

Though his correspondence survives, he did not incur further controversy and nothing more is known of him after 1826 (the date of his last published sermon), when he disappears from the public record – his date of death is unknown.

== Literary works ==
- A number of sermons.
- Autobiography, in which he represented himself as "a child of providence", a latter-day Moses with a life marked by divinely appointed trials and triumphs.

== Sources ==
- Famous adoptees
- R. Norton, Mother Clap's molly house: the gay subculture in England, 1700–1830 (1992)
- Anon, "The trial and conviction of John Church … for an assault with intent to commit an unnatural crime" (1817)
- Anon, "The infamous life of John Church, the St George's Fields preacher" (1817)
- I. McCalman, Radical underworld: prophets, revolutionaries, and pornographers in London, 1795–1840 (1988)
- W. Benbow, The crimes of the clergy (1823) – an ultra-radical anti-clericalist pamphlet
- R. Norton, John Church in Who's who in Gay and Lesbian History Aldrich, Robert and Wotherspoon, Garry (Eds) (2001)
