= HIV-affected community =

HIV-Affected community
- Specialty: HIV/AIDS
- Risk factors: Mainly unprotected sex
- Diagnostic method: Community-based Diagnosis methods

The affected community (also known as the HIV-affected community) is composed of people who are living with HIV and AIDS, plus individuals whose lives are directly influenced by HIV infection. This originally was defined as young to middle aged adults who associate with being gay or bisexual men, and or injection drug users. HIV-affected community is a community that is affected directly or indirectly affected by HIV. These communities are usually influenced by HIV and undertake risky behaviours that lead to a higher chance of HIV infection. To date HIV infection is still one of the leading cause of deaths around the world with an estimate of 36.8 million people diagnosed with HIV by the end of 2017, but there can particular communities that are more vulnerable to HIV infection, these communities include certain races, gender, minorities, and disadvantaged communities. One of the most common communities at risk is the gay community as it is commonly transmitted through unsafe sex. The main factor that contributes to HIV infection within the gay/bisexual community is that gay men do not use protection when performing anal sex or other sexual activities which can lead to a higher risk of HIV infections. Another community will be people diagnosed with mental health issues, such as depression is one of the most common related mental illnesses associated with HIV infection. HIV testing is an essential role in reducing HIV infection within communities as it can lead to prevention and treatment of HIV infections but also helps with early diagnosis of HIV. Educating young people in a community with the knowledge of HIV prevention will be able to help decrease the prevalence within the community. As education is an important source for development in many areas. Research has shown that people more at risk for HIV are part of disenfranchised and inner city populations as drug use and sexually transmitted diseases(STDs) are more prevalent. People with mental illnesses that inhibit making decisions or overlook sexual tendencies are especially at risk for contracting HIV.

== Community members ==
All members of a community are exposed or vulnerable to HIV infections, as in which HIV-affected community includes people that are affected by HIV or even influenced by it. Communities that are affected by HIV are usually doing risky behaviours, these behaviours include; sexual activities without the use of protection, and sharing of syringes and needles can contribute to HIV infection. These risk factors and behaviours includes; communities high in other sexually transmitted diseases such as gonorrhea, herpes, etc. and communities that are active users of sharing needles that includes drug solutions(WHO. HIV) Other factors that associate with communities such as limited healthcare access, poverty and power imbalances. all contribute towards communities that are affected by HIV.

These communities include large metropolitan communities that include certain ethnic/racial, gender, and behavioural of subpopulations that may be affected by high rates of HIV counts. Other communities in the rural areas could be more exposed to HIV infections as there is lack of communication between the outside world, such as less health care services, lack of food supplies and also education, that could be factors of increasing HIV infections. Communities in rural areas also suffer from obtaining an adequate and affordable house and it could be difficult for HIV infected people to rent a house if the landlord discovers they are infected with HIV. It is better to consider communities that include people who are more active in risky behaviours and are from particular racial groups that will be more likely to be affected by HIV. It will help to increase the chances of decreasing the prevalence of HIV overall and also helps to decrease the prevalence of HIV within that community. Communities are also socially impacted, family members that are affected by HIV reduces the capacity of that family to generate income and support for their family members. It also has a reduction in individual's self care even though if they do not have HIV, but through taking their time to provide care and support to other people that are affected by HIV. The suffering of HIV within communities does not affect some people within the community but the majority of the community. These affected HIV communities also work with their government in developing new approaches towards prevention of HIV, it helps to understand the effectiveness of community approaches and potentially assisting in the global crisis of HIV.

== Affected communities ==
Many communities are affected by HIV infection, whether they're infected or Influenced by HIV. In regards to the United States statistics of HIV infection among gay and bisexual men, there were 38,729 new cases recorded in 2017 but 70% of those cases were among adults and adolescents that are bisexual and gay men. There are a range of different communities that may be more vulnerable towards HIV infections, these communities include; young women in Africa and Indigenous communities in different countries. These communities come from different countries, which may vary the amount of infection in proportion to the population of the country but other factors may include such as disadvantages that may impact the community.

As it is more common for gay and bisexual men to interact in sexual activities like anal sex, without the use of protection, it can not only lead to HIV infection but also the transmission of other sexually transmitted diseases. This is a term called "barebacking" also known as intentional unsafe sex, as barebacking can be an unintentional health threat to the gay community. The high percentage of HIV infection within the gay/bisexual community is impacted by different factors. In most bisexual and gay communities anal sex is one of the most common factors that contribute to increasing of HIV infections, with men not using condoms or taking medicines that will help treat HIV. There are many other methods that increases HIV infection but anal sex is one of the main infection factors for HIV.

By understanding how gender affects HIV infection it is important and essential in reducing the risk of HIV, there are particular groups such as men, pregnant women, children, transgender people, and women who may have been affected by HIV infections. In 2016, 23% of HIV infection in the United States were women, similarly to men, black/African American women are more likely to be diagnosed with HIV and the most common way of transmission is through sex with a male partner. It is perceived that women need to be able to make a change in their sexual lives and insist that their partners use protection when doing sexual activities as women are bearing the burn of the HIV infection situations.

Another community that is affected by HIV are people who are diagnosed with mental illnesses and also people who are under the influence of drugs. It is believed that most HIV patients have experienced or are experiencing some sort of mental illness in their lives. The most common mental health disorders are depression and depressive symptoms, as the chance of developing a mental illness is high for HIV infected communities is two times higher in HIV-infected patients than in HIV-negative patients. It is due to the lack of prevention and diagnosis tools to support communities with mental illness, increases the rate of HIV infection within the communities.

Communities affected by HIV can include young people, young people age 10 to 24 years are increasingly being more affected by HIV in 2016 than any other age group community. There has been an increasing number of young people from 2000 to 2015 with its tripling between those periods. In 2020 the majority of people in a community are from the low and middle-income countries, which means Sub-Saharan Africa communities have a higher chance of HIV infection.

== Diagnosis within communities ==
Rapid tests can provide a same-day HIV diagnosis. However, reliable tests are less readily available in economically disadvantaged countries, delaying treatment for patients, and putting families and local communities under additional economic strain.

With the increase of new technologies and developments, people who are newly diagnosed with HIV will be able to expect a normal life span with the use of antiretroviral therapy. With the advancement of technology it has been much easier to design a multi-diagnosistic approach towards HIV infections which helps determine the prevalence and rates of HIV infection within a community. The role of states and local health departments, community-based organizations, and health care services in improving the outcome of HIV infection, this includes diagnosing HIV and reducing the rates of undiagnosed HIV infections within communities affected by HIV. Especially in HIV-affected communities, the lack of diagnosis for HIV creates complications for the public health as it will substantively increase new HIV infections, through unaware HIV positive people. In some countries community-based HIV testing services have been implemented, this is an important approach for HIV diagnosis as it is the first time tester and for people in the need for the test. These services are offered in many different areas, this includes community-based organizations, workplaces, school, and other institutions, the service is also mobile as it is designed to be provided through a mobile van, tents and other places. These services have been supported by the World Health Organization and it is widely practiced as it is targeted at particular communities to lower HIV infections. Even with the diagnosis of HIV within communities, connections of other existing diseases such as hypertension, malaria, diabetes, etc., remains a problem for community-based diagnosis services.

== Prevention and treatment ==
Originally, contracting the HIV infection meant the result was almost certainly fatal. To date, there is currently no cure for HIV, but it is more emphasised on the prevention and treatment of HIV, these approaches are related to behavioural and educational interactions. Community-based preventions are not fully developed due to the complexity of community components that prevent an accurate method of prevention for HIV infection within communities. Similarly to the roles of community-based organisations, health departments, and health care services' goal is to improve the diagnosis of HIV infection but also to prevent new HIV infections. Improvement still needs to be made across the HIV care continuum, to able to support communities/people in need for treatments and also increase prevention care goals on a national level. In the area of public health, there is a discussion between prevention and treatment, as both are limited resources, therefore, it is either treatment or prevention to be prioritized.

Within this HIV pandemic, introducing HIV strategies helps to prevent HIV infections, such as the DOT – HAART(directly observed therapy with highly active antiretroviral therapy) as it was able to decrease HIV/AIDs mortality significantly in Europe and North America. One of the main objectives of HAART is to be implemented towards poor communities however the high cost of medication and the lack of facilities needed to able to deliver such an approach has been limited. To consider community-based approaches for HIV infection to be effective, the approaches will need to decrease risky behaviours, increase condom use and increase HIV-related knowledge towards among young people living within the community. These preventions will not completely eradicate HIV infection within the community, but it will rather be able to decrease and slow down the rates of HIV infection. An important issue for community-based treatments is that within poorer communities with fewer resources have lower access to treatment of HIV infection than richer communities. Nonetheless, the HIV-affected community steadily grows due to not only unsafe sex, but also due to the lack of information on the disease. This has led to a growth in increased HIV prevention efforts being implemented everywhere, especially the susceptible areas of the world. There have also been HIV preventive groups implemented for communities where anyone who has been affected by HIV can help make efforts towards ending it.
