= List of bars =

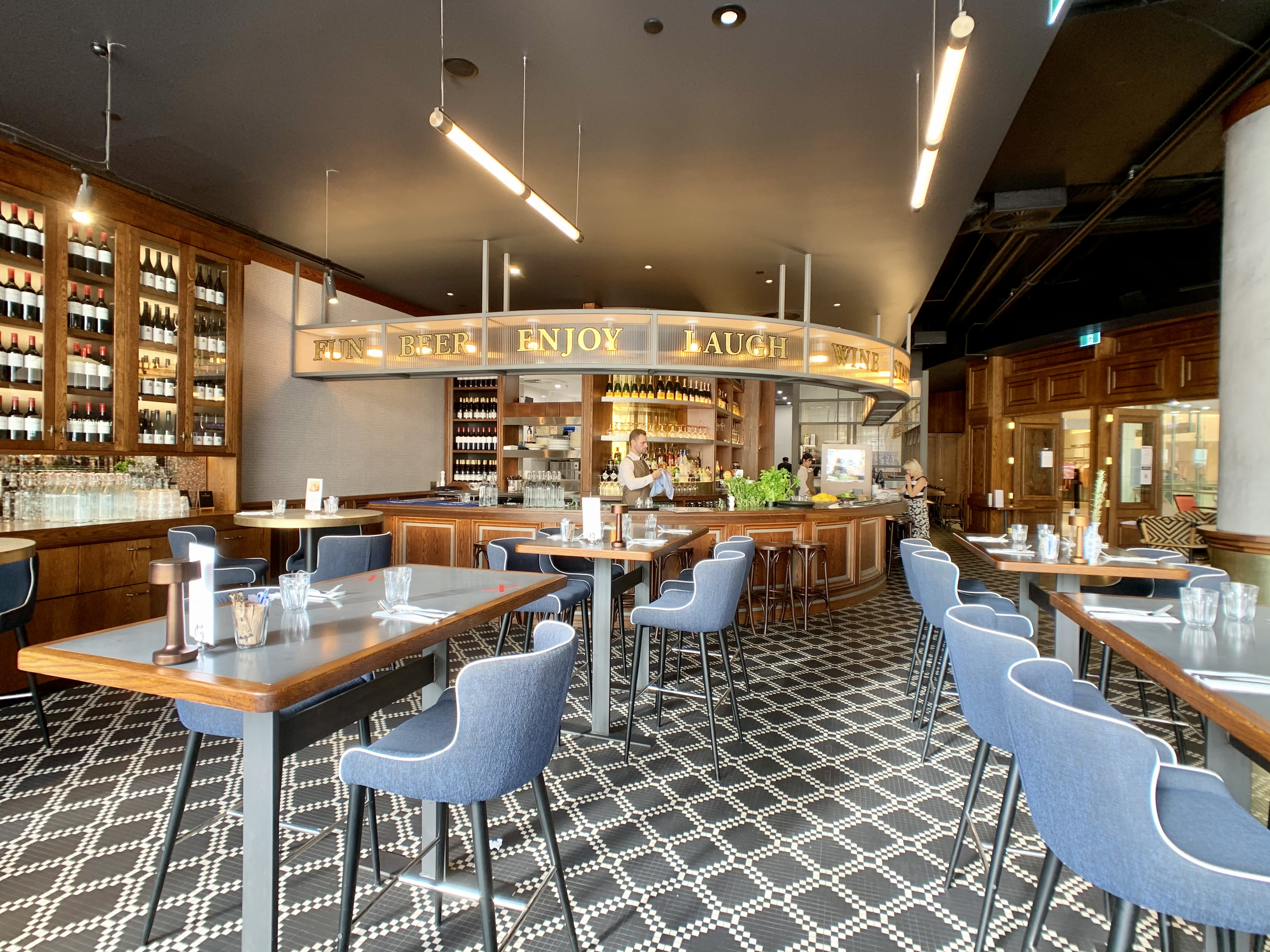
A bar in Brisbane, Queensland

This is a list of notable bars, public houses and taverns. A bar is a retail business and drinking establishment that serves alcoholic beverages, such as beer, wine, liquor, cocktails, and other beverages such as mineral water and soft drinks and often sell snack foods such as crisps or peanuts, for consumption on premises.

== Bars ==
- 21 Club
- Abbey Lounge
- Booches
- Britannia Pub
- Cafe D'Mongo's Speakeasy
- Costello's
- The Chatham
- Friar's Inn
- The Fours
- KGB
- Krazy Kat Klub
- Lucky Lou's
- Marie's Rip Tide Lounge
- The Queen's Head
- Tobacco Road
- Vesuvio Cafe

== Biker bars ==
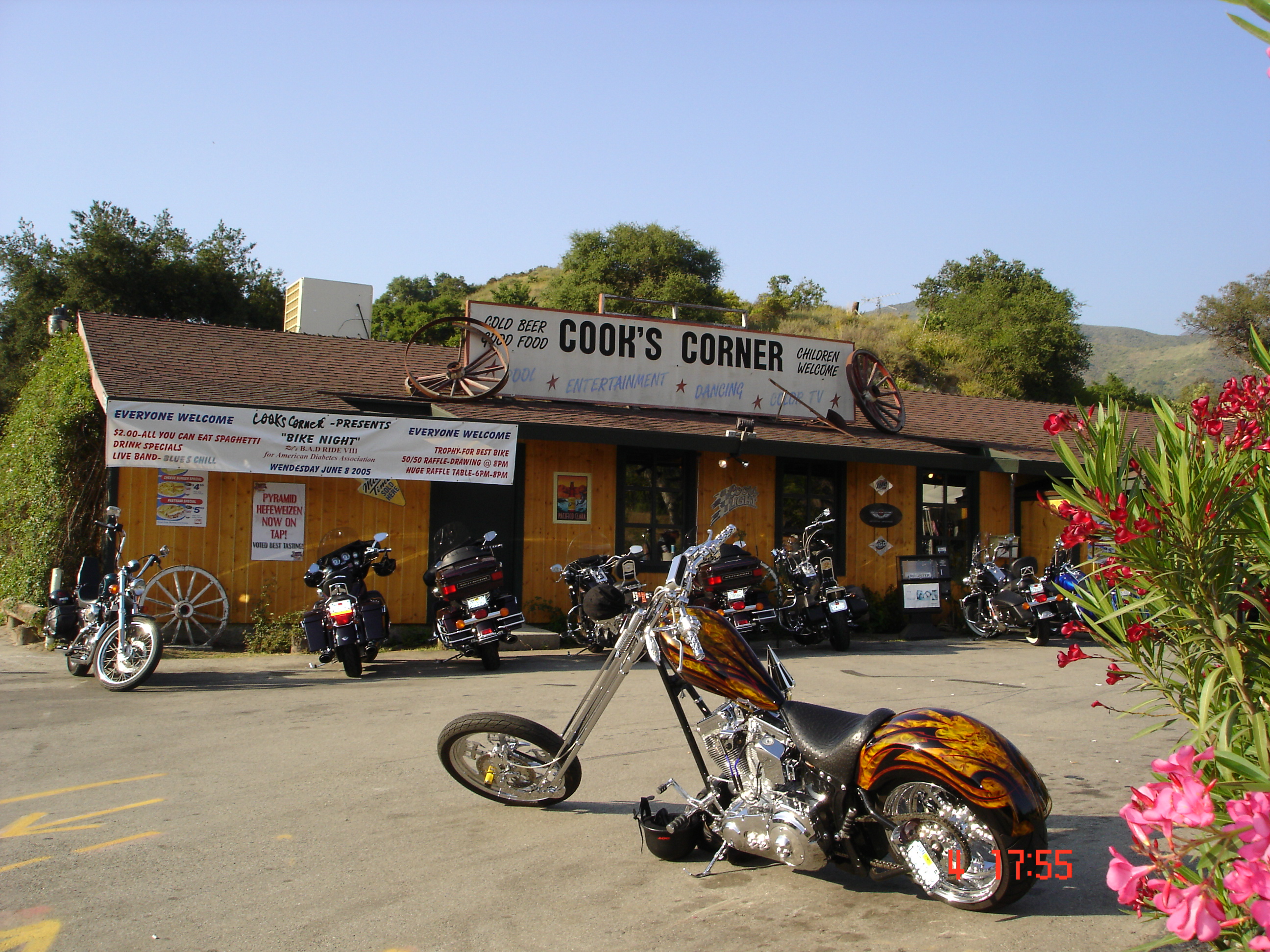
Cook's Corner, a biker bar, c. 2005

A biker bar is a bar that is frequented by motorcyclists (bikers). Some are owned or managed by people who are friendly toward motorcyclists. Biker bars are patronized by people from all walks of life, including bikers, non-bikers, and motorcycle club adherents, including outlaw motorcycle clubs.

- Ace Cafe
- Cook's Corner
- Full Throttle Saloon
- Hogs and Heifers
- Hurley Mountain Inn
- Neptune's Net
- Strokers Dallas

== Gastropubs ==
A gastropub is a bar and restaurant that serves high-end beer and food.

=== England ===
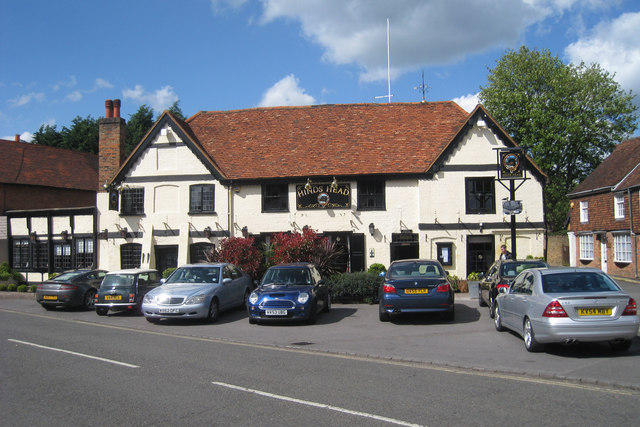
The Hinds Head in 2009

- The Hand & Flowers
- The Hinds Head
- The Old Bull and Bush
- Sir Charles Napier Inn

=== Taiwan ===
- TKK Fried Chicken – also has a location in China

=== United States ===
- The Spotted Pig

==== California ====
- Auburn Alehouse
- Father's Office

== Ice bars ==
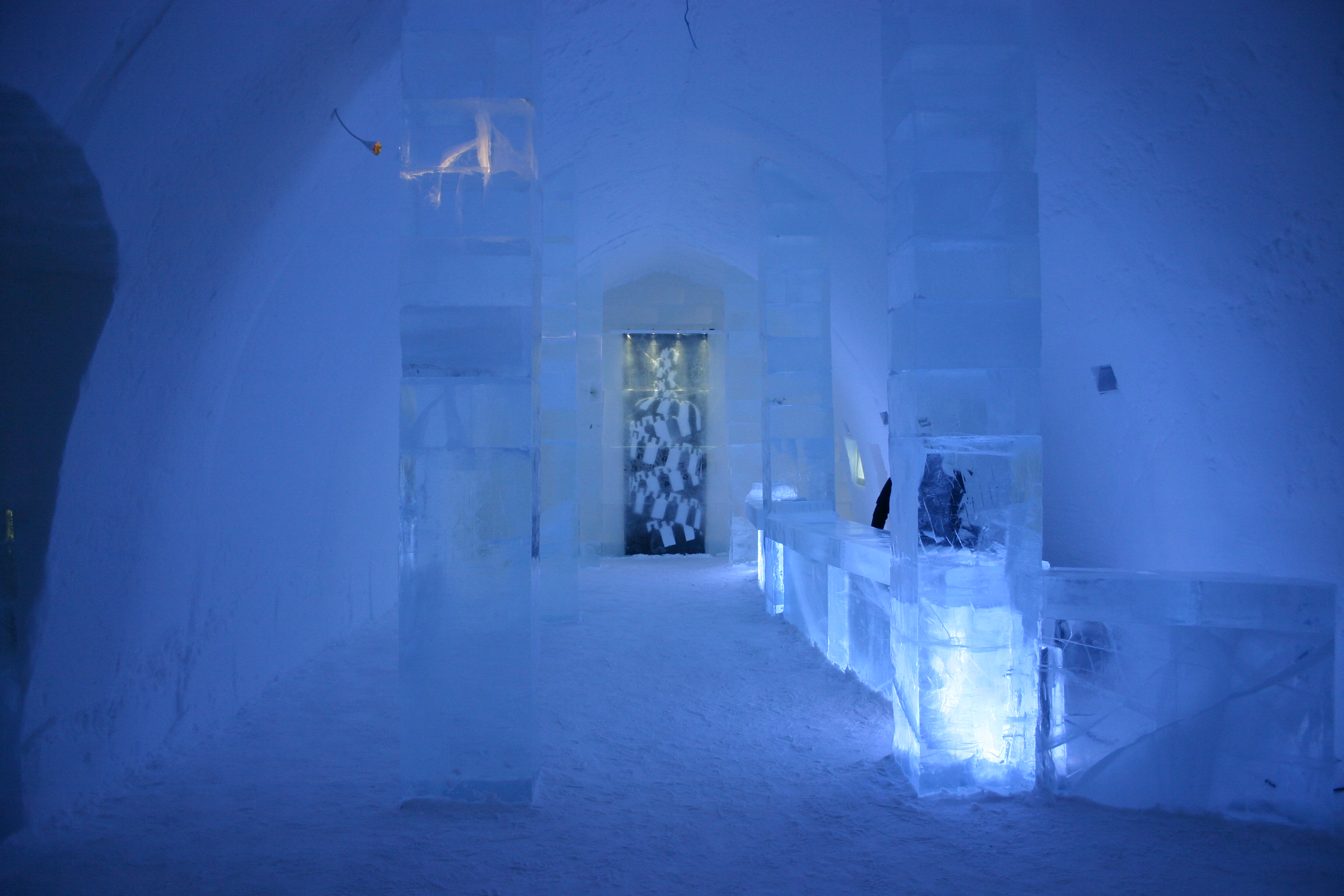
Absolut Icebar at the Icehotel in northern Sweden

An ice bar, sometimes associated with an ice hotel is a drinking establishment primarily made of ice. The bars usually contain ice sculptures and other formations and are kept at low temperatures (generally about -5 °C) to hinder melting. The walls and seating are also usually made of ice. Mostly a novelty, the ice bar is often considered a tourist destination.

- Icebar Orlando
- Icehotel

== Public houses ==
A pub, also referred to as "public house", is a house licensed to sell alcohol to the general public. It is a drinking establishment in Britain, Ireland, New Zealand, Canada, and Australia. In many places, especially in villages, a pub is the focal point of the community. Samuel Pepys described the pub as the heart of England.

=== By location ===
==== Afghanistan ====
- Irish Pub, Kabul

==== Australia ====
===== Brisbane =====
- Breakfast Creek Hotel
- Empire Hotel, Fortitude Valley
- Gambaro Group
- Grand View Hotel
- Jubilee Hotel
- Norman Hotel
- Normanby Hotel
- Orient Hotel, Brisbane
- Plough Inn
- Regatta Hotel
- Royal Exchange Hotel, Brisbane
- Transcontinental Hotel
- Victory Hotel
- Wickham Hotel

===== Melbourne =====
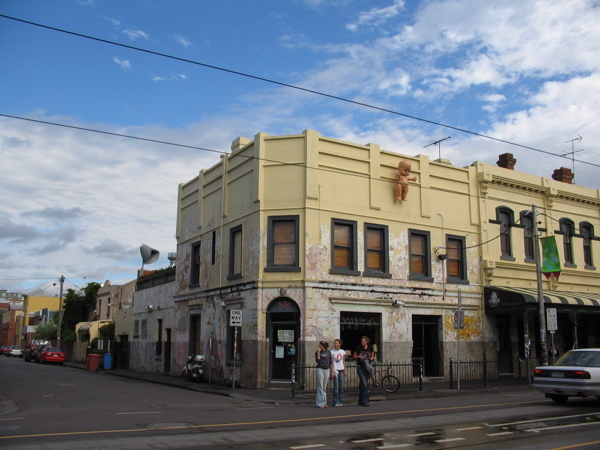
Punters Club was a pub and live music venue located in Fitzroy, inner Melbourne, Victoria, Australia.

- Corner Hotel
- Devonshire Arms, Fitzroy
- Empress Hotel, Fitzroy North
- Esplanade Hotel
- Punters Club
- The Tote Hotel
- Young and Jackson Hotel

===== Sydney =====
- Albion Hotel
- Bald Rock Hotel
- Beach Hotel
- Bowlers' Club of New South Wales
- Dick's Hotel
- Dry Dock Hotel
- Eastern Suburbs Leagues Club
- Exchange Hotel (Balmain)
- Forth & Clyde Hotel
- Grand Hotel – Broadway
- Kent Hotel
- Newport Arms Hotel
- North Sydney Leagues Club
- The Oriental Hotel
- Phoenician Club
- The Riverview Hotel, Balmain
- Royal Oak Hotel
- The Rugby Club
- Sandringham Hotel, Newtown
- Shipwright's Arms Hotel
- Sir William Wallace Hotel
- Star Hotel, Balmain
- UNSW Venues
- Volunteer Hotel
- White Bay Hotel
- White Horse Hotel, Surry Hills

==== Ireland ====
- List of pubs in Dublin

==== United Kingdom ====
- List of pubs in the United Kingdom
- List of pubs in London
  - List of award-winning pubs in London

==== United States ====
- The Cat & Fiddle
- Pig 'n Whistle

=== Former pubs ===
- Adam & Eve, Birmingham
- The Alexandra, New Barnet
- Bull and Crown, Chingford
- Fishmongers Arms
- Fleece Hotel
- Flying Horse Inn
- The Antelope Public House
- Lord High Admiral, Pimlico
- Lamb Hotel, Nantwich
- Neary's
- Queen's Head Tavern / Apollo Tavern

=== Micropubs ===
A micropub is a very small, one room public house. The concept is attributed to publican Martyn Hillier and his pub, The Butchers Arms, in Herne, Kent, England.

=== Pub chains ===
A pub chain is a group of pubs or bars with a brand image. The brand may be owned outright by one company, or there may be multiple financiers; the chain may be a division within a larger company, or may be a single operation.

- Antic Collective
- Bay Restaurant Group
- Belushi's
- Brewers Fayre
- Chef & Brewer
- Chicago Rock Cafe
- Eerie Pub Company
- Ettamogah Pub
- Firkin Brewery
- Inventive Leisure
- Mana Bar
- O'Neill's
- Punch Taverns
- Revolution Bar
- Scream Pubs
- Slug and Lettuce
- Spirit Group
- Spirit Pub Company
- Steamin' Billy
- Stonegate Pub Company
- Tynemill
- Varsity
- Walkabout
- Wetherspoons
- Yates's
- Young's

==== Mitchells & Butlers pub chains ====
Mitchells & Butlers runs around 1,600 managed public house, bars and restaurants throughout the United Kingdom.

- All Bar One
- Bass Brewery
- Harvester
- Innkeeper's Lodge
- Miller & Carter
- Mitchells & Butlers
- Mitchells & Butlers Brewery
- Mitchells & Butlers' Ground
- Nicholson's
- O'Neill's
- Phil Urban
- Toby Carvery

== Speakeasies ==
A speakeasy is an illicit establishment that sells alcoholic beverages. Such establishments came into prominence in the United States during the Prohibition era (1920–1933, longer in some states). Speakeasies largely disappeared after Prohibition was ended in 1933, and the term is now used to describe some retro style bars. Some former speakeasies continue to operate as bars.

- The Blind Pig, Michigan
- Delmonico's, New York
- Gallagher's Steakhouse, New York
- J.G. Melon, New York
- KGB, New York
- Light Horse Tavern, New Jersey
- Mystery Room, Arizona

=== Closed ===
- Arlington Steak House (formerly the Triangle Inn)
- Chumley's
- Dill Pickle Club
- Krazy Kat Klub
- Tobacco Road
- Top O' Hill Terrace

== Taverns ==
A tavern is a place of business where people gather to drink alcoholic beverages and be served food, and in most cases, where travelers receive lodging. An inn is a tavern which has a license to put up guests as lodgers. The word derives from the Latin taberna whose original meaning was a shed, workshop, stall, or pub.

=== England ===
- Upper Flask

=== United States ===
- McGillin's Olde Ale House
- Nick's Original Big Train Bar
- Old Tavern
- Tun Tavern Brewery

==== Taverns in the American Revolution ====
- Alden Tavern Site
- Buckman Tavern
- Burnham Tavern
- Cedar Bridge Tavern
- City Tavern
- Clifton House
- Fraunces Tavern
- French Arms Tavern
- Gabreil Daveis Tavern House
- Golden Plough Tavern
- Green Dragon Tavern
- Hartwell Tavern
- Indian King Tavern
- Mosby Tavern
- Munroe Tavern
- The Old 76 House
- Peleg Arnold Tavern
- Putnam Cottage
- Raleigh Tavern
- Red Lion Inn
- Rising Sun Tavern
- Rose and Crown Tavern
- Smith Tavern
- Three Pigeons
- Tun Tavern
- Warren Tavern
- White Horse Tavern
- Wright's Tavern

== Themed bars ==
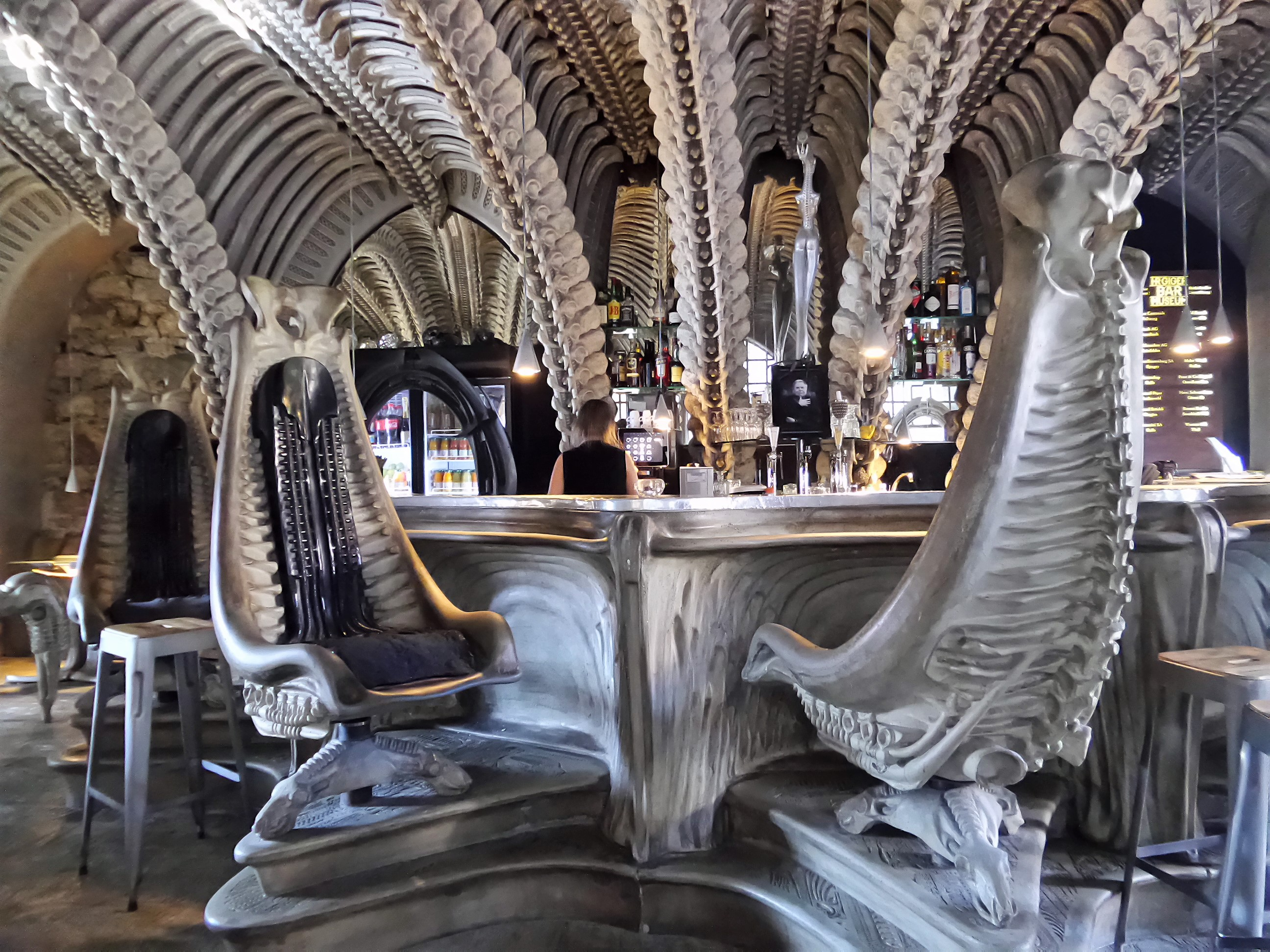
Giger Bar in Gruyères

A theme bar is an establishment centered around a specific concept, style, or subject, which influences its decor, ambiance, and sometimes its menu and drinks (similar to a theme restaurant). Examples are:

- Britannia Pub in Santa Monica, California (United States): A British-themed bar
- Coffin Club in Portland, Oregon (United States): A horror-themed bar
- Giger Bar in Chur/Gruyères (Switzerland): Interior designed by H.R. Giger, creater of the original Alien
- Storm Crow Manor in Toronto (Canada): A science fiction-themed restaurant and bar

=== Tiki bars ===
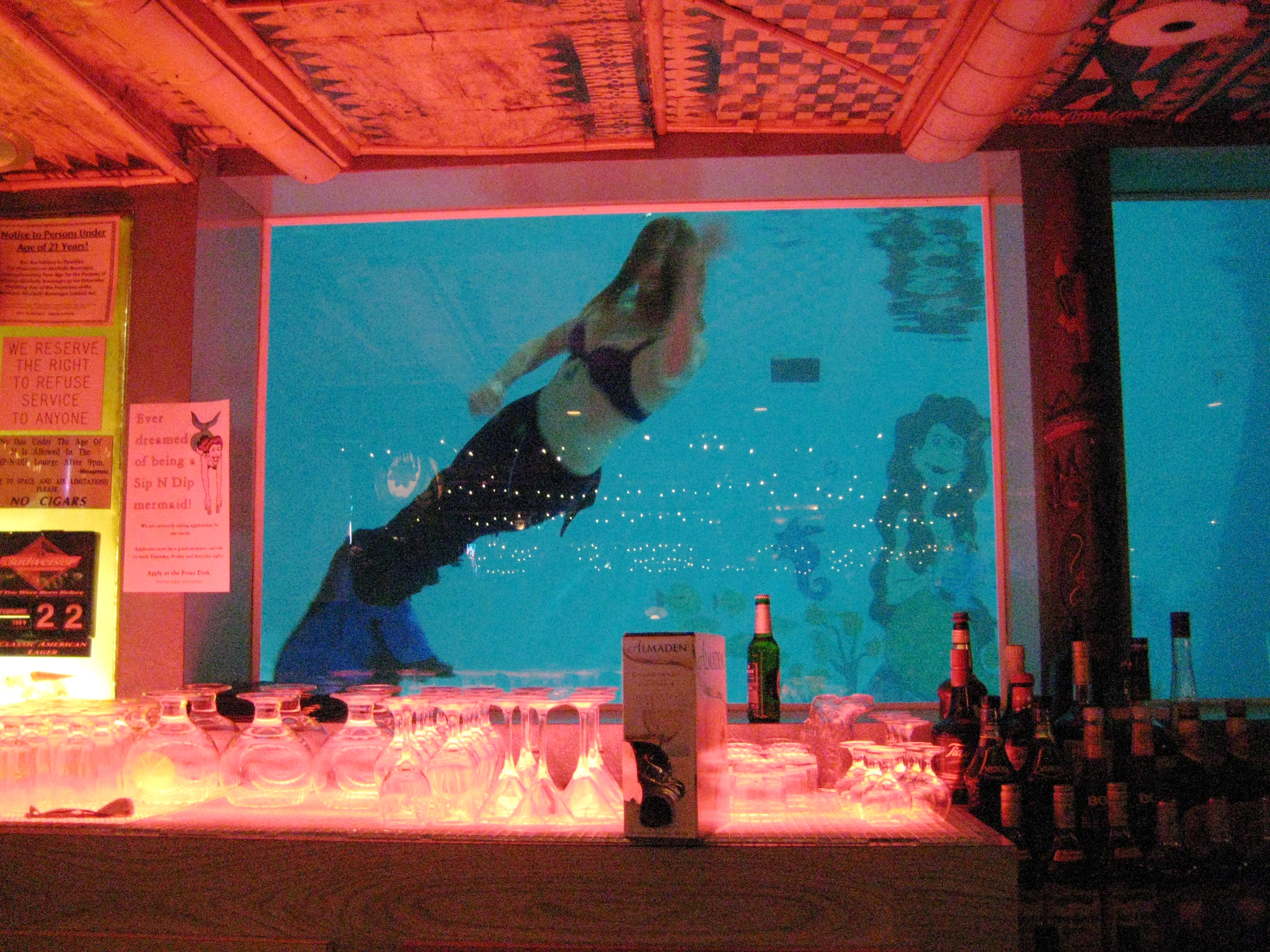
People dressed up as mermaids swim at the Sip 'n Dip tiki bar in Great Falls, Montana

A tiki bar is an exotic–themed drinking establishment that serves elaborate cocktails, especially rum-based mixed drinks such as the mai tai and zombie cocktail. These bars are aesthetically defined by their tiki culture décor which is based upon a romanticized conception of tropical cultures, most commonly Polynesian.

- Bahooka
- Bali Hai (Shelter Island)
- Jardin Tiki
- Kahiki Supper Club
- Mai-Kai Restaurant
- Sip 'n Dip Lounge
- The Hawaiian Inn
- Tiki Boyd's
- Tiki Ti
- Tonga Room
- Trader Sam's Enchanted Tiki Bar
- Trader Vic's

== Wine bars ==
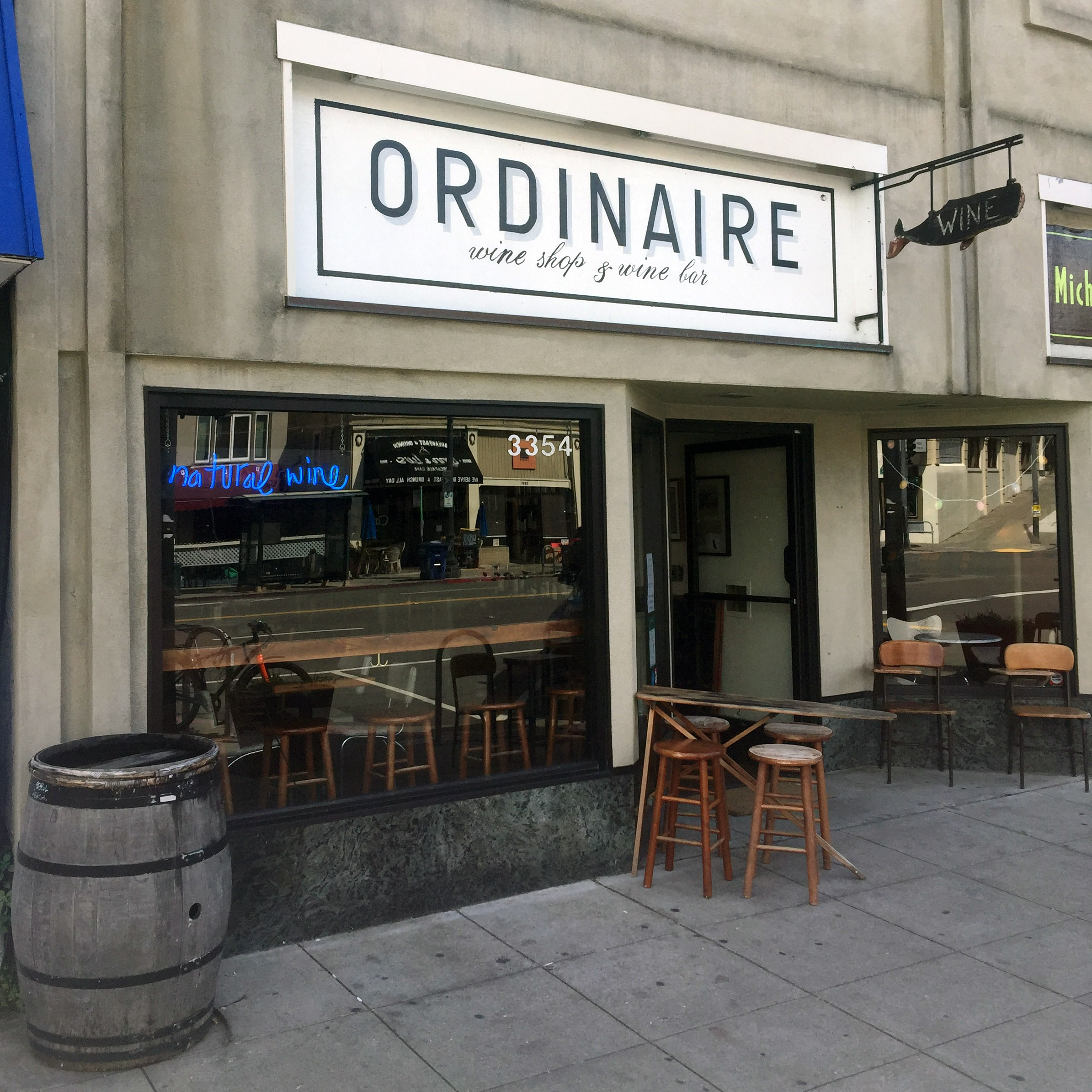
Ordinaire, a wine bar in Oakland, California

A wine bar, sometimes called a bodega, is a bar that principally or exclusively serves wine.

- El Vino (London, UK)
- Giant Cask (Bad Dürkheim, Germany)
- Ordinaire (Oakland, California)
- Vino Volo (San Francisco, California)
- Zum Weinberg (Wismar, Germany)

== See also ==
- List of dive bars
- List of microbreweries
- Types of drinking establishments
- The World's 50 Best Bars
