= The Railway, Putney =

Bar in Putney

Coordinates: 51.461183°N 0.2194475°W

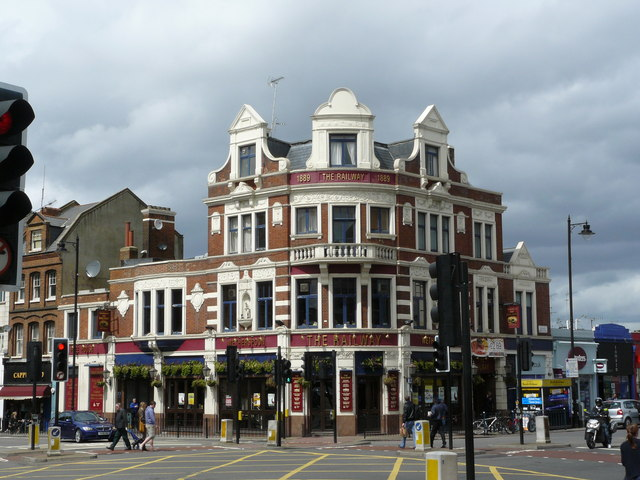
The Railway pub in 2009

The Railway is a pub in Putney, in the London Borough of Wandsworth.

== Location ==
The pub was on the northwest corner of the Upper Richmond road and Putney High street, at number 202 Upper Richmond road.

== History ==
The pub was built in 1886 on the site of the former Railway hotel.

The band The Police headlined their first gig at the pub in 1977.

The pub was managed by Drummonds between 1986 and 1993, then by J D Wetherspoon pub until 2017. The pub was protected by Wandsworth Council from redevelopment in 2016.

== Management ==
In 2021 the pub was managed by the Revolution Bars Group who subsequently left in May 2023, in September 2023 Urban Pubs & Bars took over.
