= Britannia Pub =

Restaurant in Santa Monica, California, U.S.

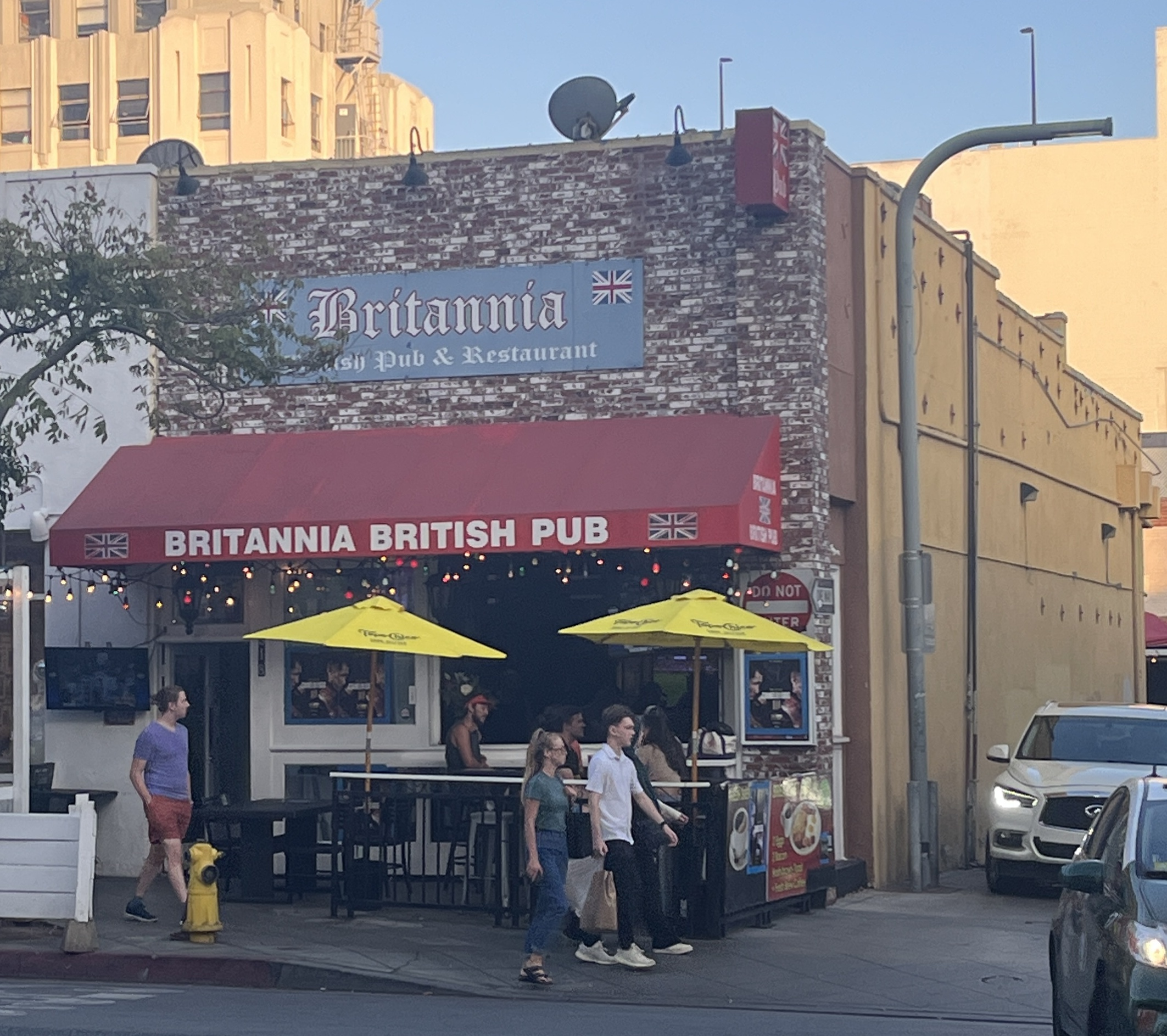
- The bar's exterior, 2022
- Interactive map of Britannia Pub

Restaurant information
- Owner: Paul Cain
- Food type: British
- Location: 318 Santa Monica Boulevard, Santa Monica, Los Angeles, California, 90401, United States
- Coordinates: 34°0′57.4″N 118°29′43.5″W
- Website: britanniapub.com

Britannia Pub was a British-themed bar and restaurant in Santa Monica, California, United States. The pub served British cuisine such as bangers and mash, fish and chips, sausage rolls, and shepherd's pie. Britannia was known for screening sports events, especially Philadelphia Eagles and Pennsylvania State University games. It also hosted viewing parties for television shows and events related to the British royal family, including the funeral of Diana, Princess of Wales and the coronation of Charles III and Camilla. The bar hosted various other events such as fundraisers, karaoke, lectures, and musical performances.

== Description ==
Described as a local hangout, the British-themed pub Britannia Pub (nicknamed "The Brit") operated in Santa Monica, California. In Hometown Santa Monica (2007), Jenn Garbee, Nancy Gottesman, and Colleen Dunn Bates wrote: "By day, Britannia is a friendly English pub where regulars saddle up to the bar [...] and tourists settle at a table outside for a traditional English lunch. By nightfall, it morphs into half karaoke club, half traditional pub – an odd combo that works well for the youngest imbibers." According to Fodor's, the bar hosted karaoke on Thursdays and Saturdays in 2012.

The Infatuation said to "expect rowdy crowds, pub foods, and lots of boxing on TV". Britannia served bangers and mash, fish and chips, sausage rolls, shepherd's pie, and ale. The pub also offered pretzels made by Los Angeles-based Shappy Pretzel Co. For breakfast, Britannia served Irish bacon and egg sandwiches. Drink options included beer, cocktails such as mimosas, and a "snakebite", which was half cider and half Guinness.

== History ==
Paul Cain was a co-owner of the pub, and his son helped run the business. Britannia was vandalized in 2016. Outdoor dining was made available during the COVID-19 pandemic. Britannia was featured on the television series Food Fetish in 2021. Britannia sponsored Matador FC of the Los Angeles Premier League. In 2024, the business partnered with the pop-up SportsFest, allowing guests to order food from the restaurant via an app.

In April 2026, the business announced plans to close permanently in July because of a lease expiration.

=== Events ===
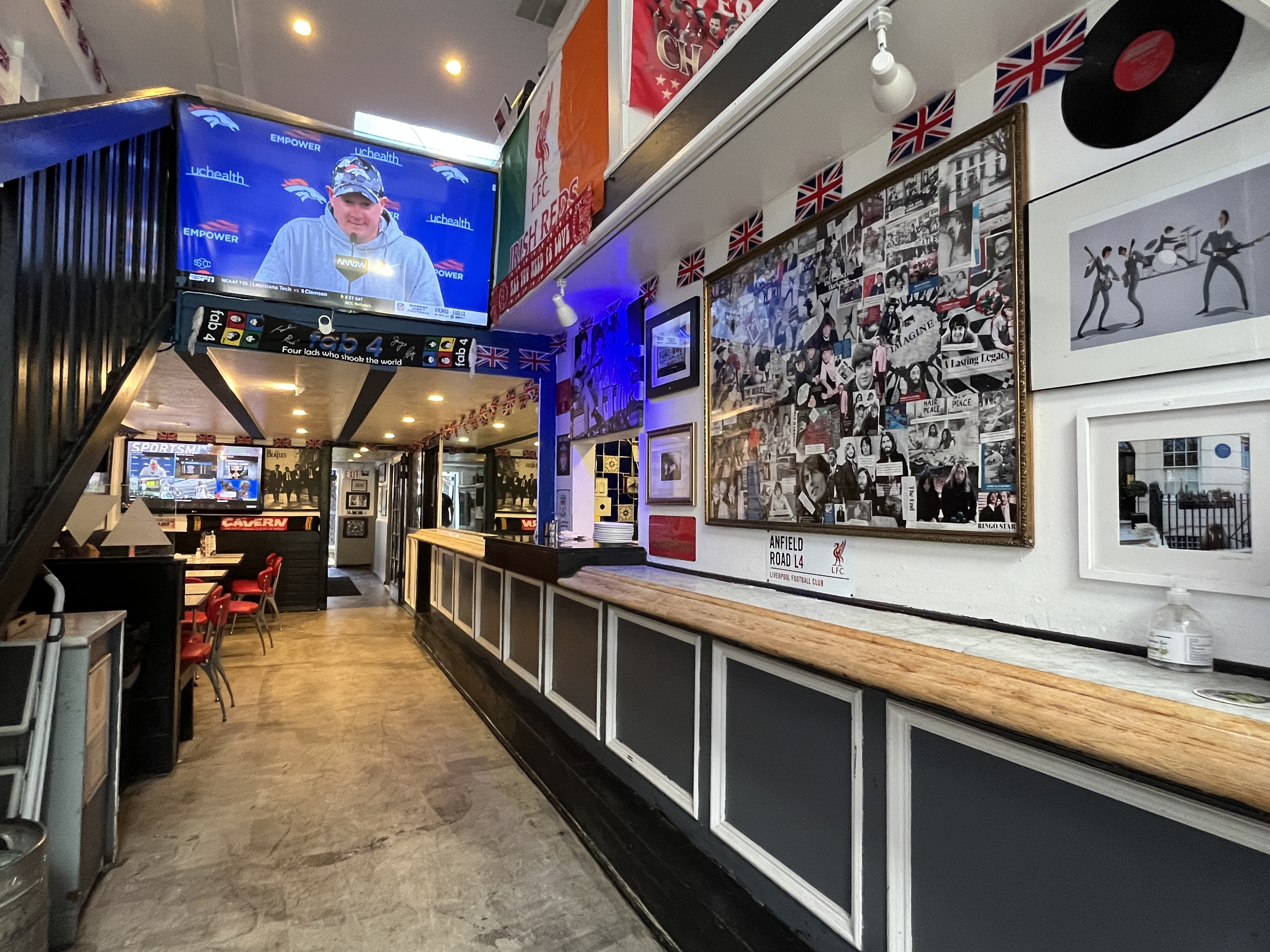
Interior, 2022

Britannia hosted a variety of events. The bar screened Philadelphia Eagles games and has been dubbed "Eagles Nest West". It also screened Pennsylvania State University games for over a decade.

In 1997, the bar streamed the funeral of Diana, Princess of Wales. In 2012, Britannia hosted a lecture by Beatles expert Kenneth Womack, followed by a Beatles cover band. The restaurant hosted "celebratory" karaoke and offered beer and food specials for Boxing Day in 2015. In 2018, actress and comedian Hannah Einbinder and her father were shown celebrating at a Super Bowl LII viewing party on KTLA, marking her first television appearance. She discussed the coverage during her 2024 interview with Stephen Colbert on The Late Show. In 2023, Britannia hosted a viewing party for Super Bowl LVII and a special event for the coronation of Charles III and Queen Camilla.

In 2024, Jason Kelce made a guest appearance and bartended at Britannia when he visited Greater Los Angeles for Monday Night Football. Britannia hosted a watch party to collect essential items for locals and donations for a fire station during the January 2025 Southern California wildfires. The Philadelphia Eagles team donated prizes for the event. Britannia also hosted a viewing party for the finale of the seventh season of Love Island in 2025.

== Reception ==
In 2008, John Flinn of the San Francisco Chronicle described Britannia as "one of three authentic British pubs in Santa Monica" but said the space is "a bit loud for [his] tastes". J. Brady McCollough included Britannia in the Los Angeles Times' 2021 "ultimate" college football sports bar guide for Southern California, writing: "It's unclear what Penn State and Brits have in common beyond the original founding of Pennsylvania by English writer and good Quaker William Penn, but Britannia Pub is definitely the spot for Nittany Lions fans to congregate in their timeless navy and white jerseys."

== See also ==
- List of bars
- List of British restaurants
- List of defunct restaurants of the United States
