= The Queen's Head (Amsterdam) =

Gay bar in Amsterdam

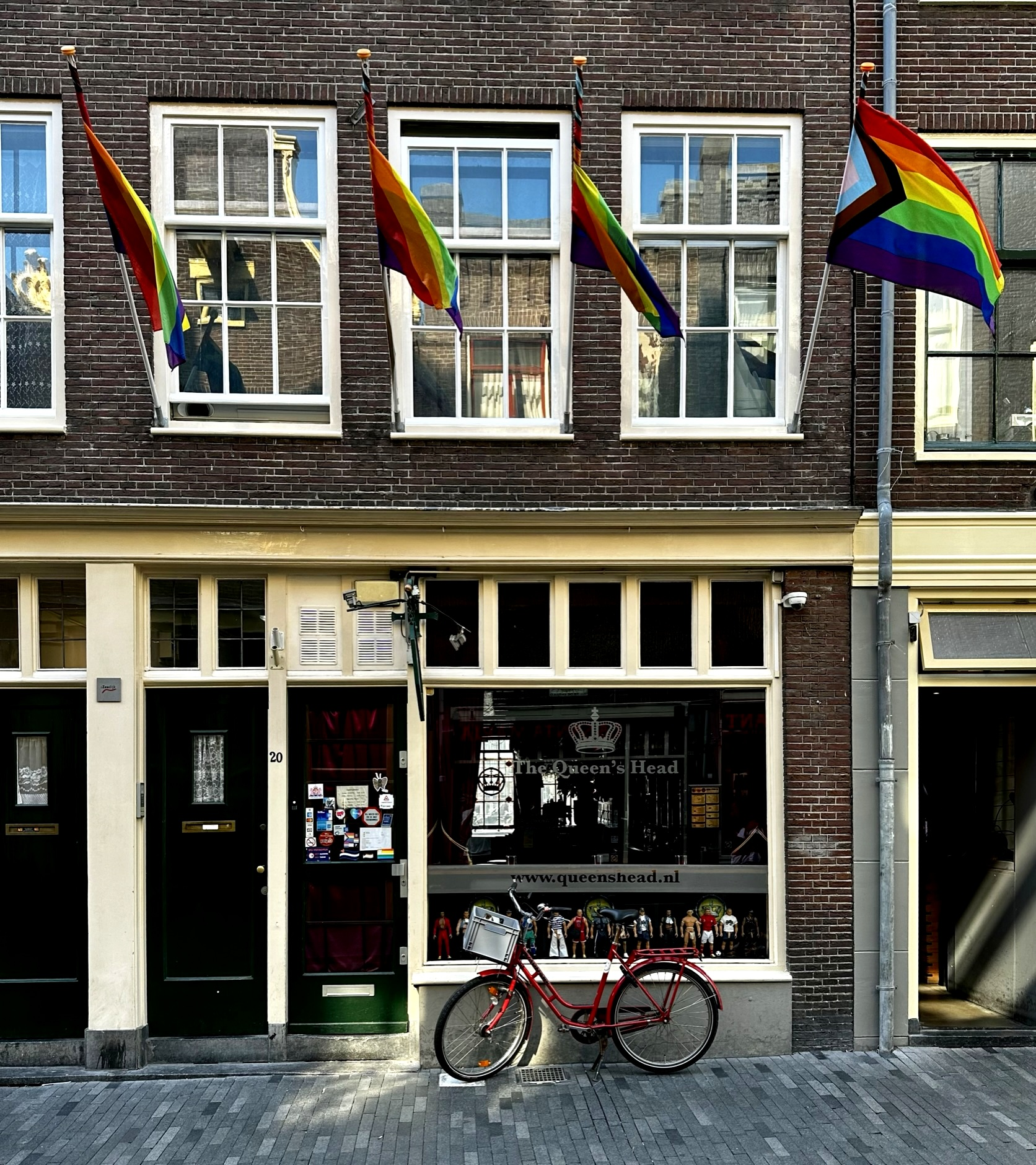
- Entrance on the Zeedijk, September 2023
- Interactive map of The Queen's Head
- Address: Zeedijk 20, Amsterdam
- Coordinates: 52.3756272°N 4.8984045°E
- Type: Gay bar; nightclub

Construction
- Opened: 26 May 1998

Website
- queenshead.nl

The Queen's Head is a gay bar located at Zeedijk 20 in the centre of Amsterdam. It opened in 1998 and is known for its drag queen bingo evenings.

== History ==
In the 1980s Zeedijk Street was the location of significant drug use, but after this was successfully reduced the city of Amsterdam and entrepreneurs worked to revitalise the area. John Dijkmeijer saw potential in a struggling lounge bar on Zeedijk, run by his neighbour's son; the property had a basement with French doors and a view of the canal. In 1998 with his life partner Willem de Wit he took it over, so de Wit could give drag queen performances under his stage name Dusty, and The Queen's Head opened on 26 May 1998. These performances stopped in 2003, and Dijkmeijer sold The Queen's Head to Don Nottet in 2004. Arjan de Wit became co-owner in 2010 and put the café up for sale in 2014 after Nottet had a stroke and was unable to run the business. At the start of 2015, The Queen's Head was taken over by John Jepma and Leon Oppers, who wanted to ensure the continued existence of the popular gay bar.

After The Queen's Head opened, a cluster of three other gay bars emerged in the northern part of the Zeedijk, making this street one of Amsterdam's gay nightlife areas. In 2015, gay bar De Engel van Amsterdam was taken over by the shipping company 't Smidtje, and the adjacent De Engel Next Door also closed. In 2016 De Barderij was sold and no longer attracted a gay audience, so The Queen's Head is now the only remaining gay pub in this part of the Zeedijk. The iconic gay bar Café 't Mandje, also on Zeedijk, opened in 1927, closed in 1982, and reopened in 2008.

== Description ==
The Queen's Head features a bar at the front, a performance stage in the center, and several seating areas with tables in the back. The decor is classic Dutch "gay bar" (nichtenkroeg) with red wallpaper, chandeliers, and heavy curtains, described as "1950s glam kitsch". The basement has a smoking area with a view of where the canals Oudezijds Achterburgwal and Oudezijds Voorburgwal meet; it won the 2009 Gouda Peuk Award as Amsterdam's best smoking room (smoking in bars in Amsterdam was banned in 2020).

== Reception ==
Under the stage name Dusty, Willem de Wit hosted a weekly Tuesday bingo evening with banter and comedy from 1998 to 2003, making him the "uncrowned bingo queen of Amsterdam". He appeared in a twelve-part weekly RTL 4 reality series about the Zeedijk in 1999, the highlight of which was de Wit collecting Dusty's iconic wig from the manufacturer in England and having it baptised by Dolly Bellefleur. After the RTL 4 series, so many tourists began coming to bingo evenings that seat reservations were needed. After five years Dusty had had enough and ended his performances, but returned in 2013 by popular request, this time under the name Dusty Gersanowitz. In addition to bingo nights, The Queen's Head initially hosted performances by Dolly Bellefleur and sports-themed sex parties, but its activities have since been toned down. There is still a popular weekly bingo night on Tuesdays and drag performances under the name "Queens in Queen's", as well as biweekly drinks for bears. On 26 May 2018, The Queen's Head celebrated its 20th anniversary.

== See also ==
- List of bars
- List of LGBTQ bars
