= Old Tavern (Sacramento, California) =

- U.S. National Register of Historic Places
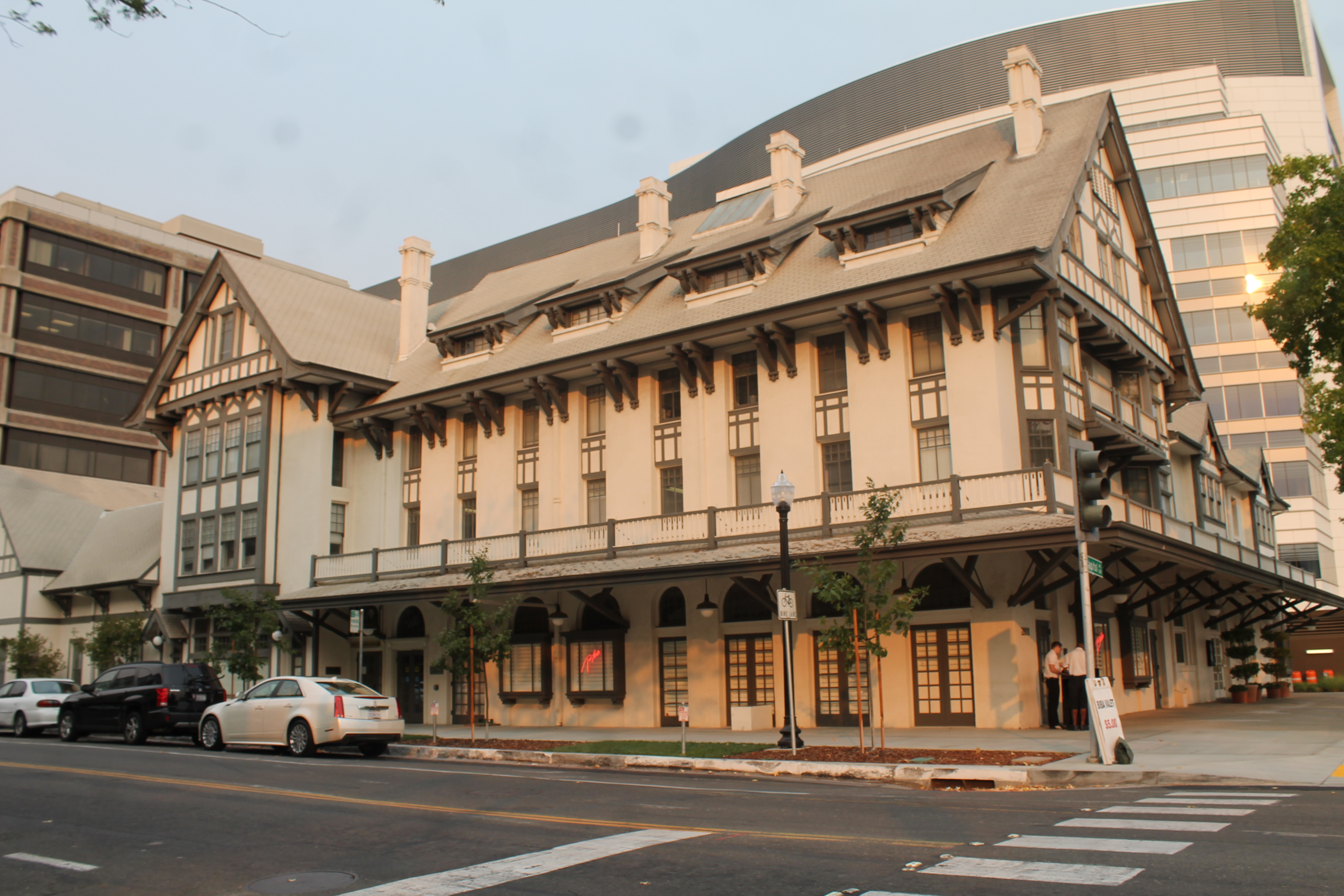

- Location within Sacramento, California Location within California Location within the United States
- Location: 2801 Capitol Ave., Sacramento, California
- Coordinates: 38°34′15″N 121°28′9″W
- Area: 0.6 acres (0.24 ha)
- Built: c. 1870s
- Built by: Madden, M.
- Architectural style: Tudor Revival architecture
- NRHP reference No.: 83001225
- Added to NRHP: September 15, 1983

The Old Tavern (also known as the Sacramento Brewery) is a historic building listed on the National Register of Historic Places located in Sacramento, California.

The first structure on the site of the Old Tavern, likely used for storage, was built by John Sutter after he constructed Sutter's Fort across the street. This edifice was expanded in the early 1850s when a Philip Scheld turned it into a two-story building and founded Scheld's Sacramento Brewery. Additional floors and buildings were added to the estate over the years as it was used for various business including a speakeasy, apartments, and a data-processing center.

During its time as a tavern, the site was a widely known landmark and a frequent stopping spot for stagecoaches on their way to downtown Sacramento.

The building was renovated in the mid to late 1980s to allow for an Italian restaurant to occupy the original tavern section and medical offices for other parts of the building.

It is rumored, with at least one historian agreeing, that in the 19th century there was a brothel upstairs frequented by Sacramento pioneers.
