= Light Horse Tavern =

Coordinates: 40.71395°N 74.03832°W

- Interactive map of Light Horse Tavern

Restaurant information
- Established: 2002
- Owners: Bill Gray and Ron Smith
- Location: 199 Washington Street, Jersey City, Hudson, New Jersey, 07302, United States
- Website: http://www.lighthorsetavern.com/

Light Horse Tavern is a restaurant located in Jersey City, New Jersey. Restored from an 1850s tavern, the building served as a speakeasy during Prohibition in the United States. Founders Bill Gray and Ron Smith named the restaurant after Henry Lee III, known as "Light Horse Harry", a historical figure from the American Revolution. Its first chef was Ian Topper-Kapitan; he was replaced in 2007 by Marcos Costas.

Reception of the restaurant included multiple favorable reviews in The Jersey Journal, the New Jersey section of The New York Times, and New Jersey Monthly.

== History ==
The restaurant was restored from an 1850s tavern. The Jersey Journal described the facility as a "pre-Civil War building that boasts a coveted landmark status". The building previously served as a speakeasy during Prohibition and functioned as a neighborhood bar. Light Horse Tavern was named after Henry Lee III, known as "Light Horse Harry", a historical figure from the American Revolution. Light Horse Harry led the successful Battle of Paulus Hook, which helped to retain Jersey City as a stronghold for the Continental Army.

Founders and brothers-in-law Bill Gray and Ron Smith started the establishment after becoming familiar with the relevant history while restoring two neighboring buildings. The restaurant first opened in 2002 with chef Ian Topper-Kapitan, pastry chef Marco Runanin, and wine steward Roland Arnold. In February 2010, the restaurant served as a location for an opening reception of visual artist, Frank Messina.

== Cuisine ==
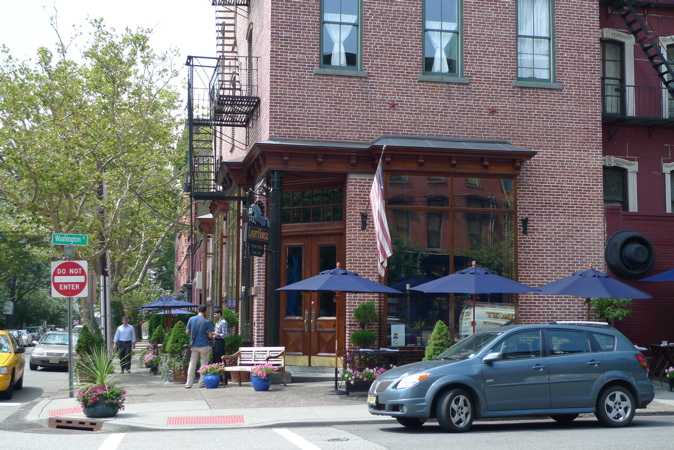
Light Horse Tavern (August 2009)

Chef Ian Topper-Kapitan was replaced in 2007 by Marcos Costas, who had previously been employed at Lespinasse and the Essex House in New York City. Dishes at the restaurant have included lobster salad and pan-roasted salmon, in addition to "a crisp, greaseless version of fish and chips". Troy Unruh joined the restaurant as executive chef in November 2008; he left in 2009 to become executive chef at a restaurant called Zylo.

== Reception ==
Light Horse Tavern received favorable mention in a 2003 review for The Jersey Journal, which noted, "With its beautiful decor, try to stay focused on the food. It's surprisingly good and reasonably priced." The Waterfront Journal described the Light Horse Tavern in 2004 as "an exquisite restaurant where you can dine Manhattan-style". In 2004, Hudson Reporter referred to the establishment as "the center" of the "political world" in Hudson County, New Jersey. The publication noted, "Unfortunately, so many political people show up at the Light Horse these days that enemies cannot help but bump into each other." The tavern was a favorite hangout location for New Jersey politician Paul Byrne. In 2005, The Jersey Journal recommended the Light Horse Tavern among locations to celebrate New Year's Eve. A 2006 article about Jersey City in New York Magazine highlighted the Light Horse Tavern, among recommended local attractions of the city, and described it as "upscale".

The New York Times included the restaurant in a 2007 piece on regional New Jersey restaurants, "Standouts Among the Year's Best", giving the restaurant a rating of "very good". (Note: The paper explained its standards: "Of the 46 restaurants we reviewed, 21 (or 46 percent) received one of the top ratings: 3 excellent, 18 very good.") David Corcoran wrote favorably of the restaurant in a 2007 review for The New York Times, and commented of the establishment's bar: "Long and lively, a scene all its own. Extensive, well-chosen wine and beer lists." In 2008, New Jersey Monthly selected Light Horse Tavern as "Critics' Choice" for "Best Bar Scene". Amaechi Okoro wrote favorably of the dining and bar at the establishment in a 2008 piece for The Waterfront Journal, and called it a "classy alternative" to louder facilities. Stan Parish of New Jersey Monthly reviewed the restaurant in 2008, and came to a negative conclusion, "Best bet? Sidle up to the bar, where you should have been all along, for a can of Young’s Chocolate Stout. Bottom line? The neighs have it." Mariam Ayad of The Waterfront Journal wrote of the establishment's bar in 2009, "The Light Horse Tavern is a nice bar with a cozy fireplace and tidy table arrangement. Behind the bar, you'll find friendly bartenders ready to listen or have a good laugh. The venue also hosts live music a few days each week." In 2010, New Jersey Monthly highlighted the establishment among "Critics' Picks" for beer selection, in its "2010 Readers' and Critics' Restaurant Poll". Jon Whiten of The Jersey City Independent recommended the restaurant among "This Weekend’s Best Bets" in June 2010, for its wine tasting fundraiser with sommelier Roland Arnold. Zagat Survey listed Light Horse Tavern as "top listed" in "Best Buys: Pub Grub".

== See also ==
- Light-Horse Harry
