= The Alexandra, New Barnet =

Former pub in London, England

Coordinates: 51.64758°N 0.16743°W

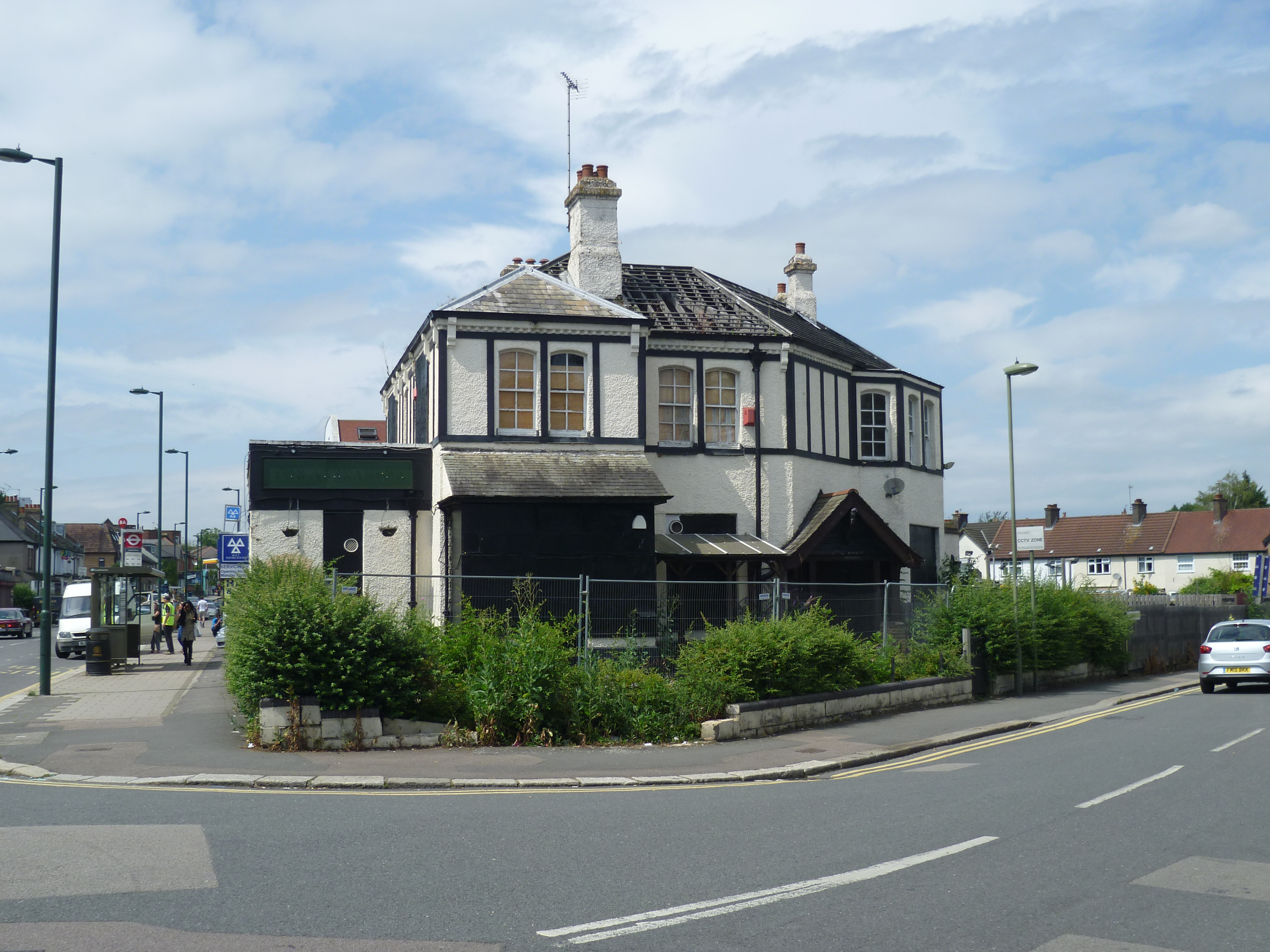
The disused Alexandra shortly before it was demolished in 2015.

The Alexandra was a pub at 133 East Barnet Road, New Barnet, London, dating from the mid nineteenth century. It was on the corner with Victoria Road. The pub was demolished in 2015 and replaced with housing.

== History ==
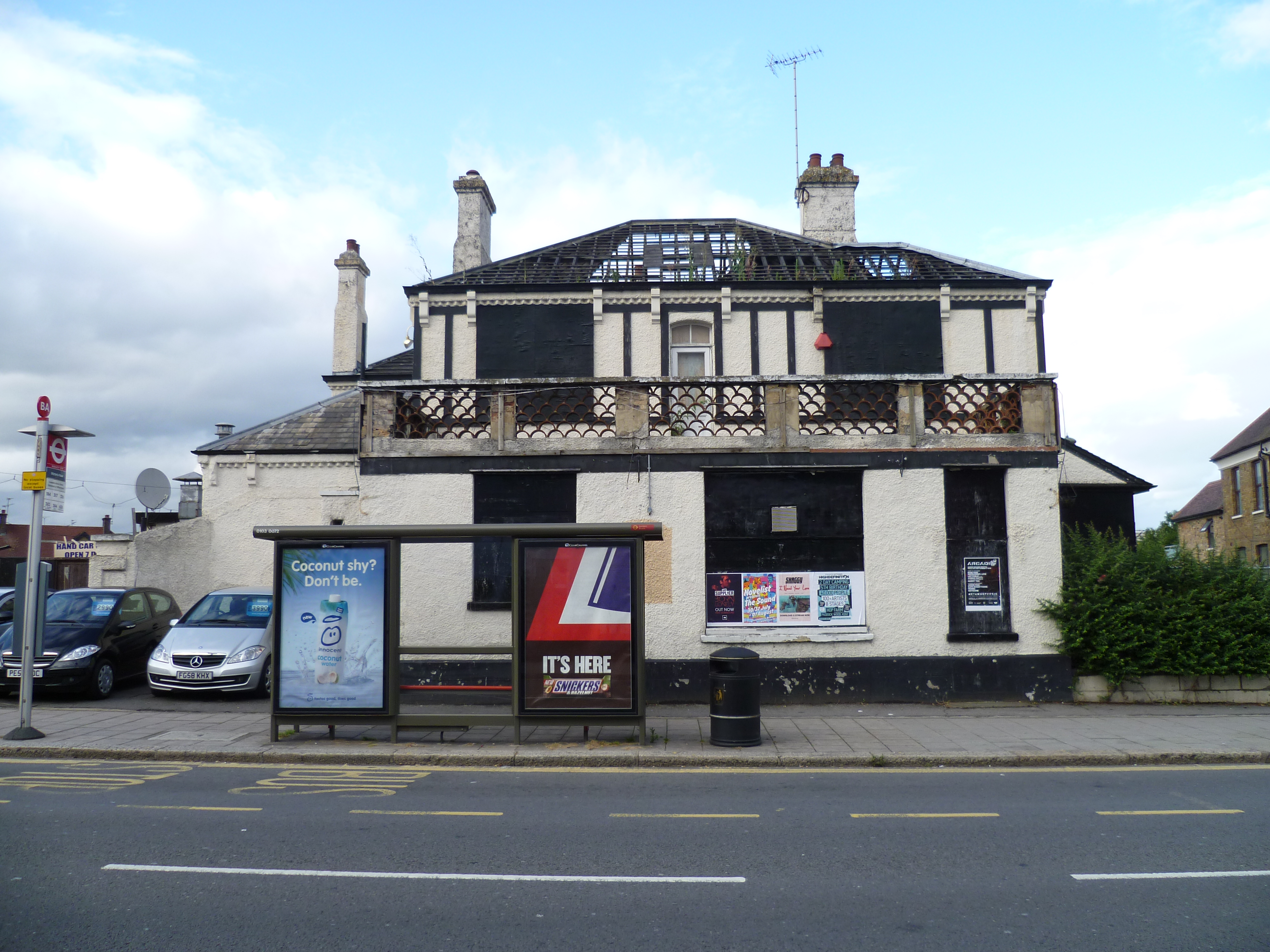
The Alexandra from East Barnet Road.

The pub was formerly known as the Alexandra Tavern and appears in newspapers under that name as early as 1869. It was probably built during the development of the area after the opening of nearby New Barnet railway station in 1850.

In October 1871, the landlord changed from Mr Hocking to Walter Capon.

In February 1881, the landlord, Mr Decamps, was burned when, having detected a strong smell of gas, he went searching for the source of the leak with a lighted candle. His daughter Miss Decamps was "slightly scorched".

In 1905, the pub was run by the Barnet Brewery.

In 1953 the pub was taken by Desmond and Thelma Blackall who run it until the mid ‘80's, whilst it was owned by Charrington brewery.

== Closure ==
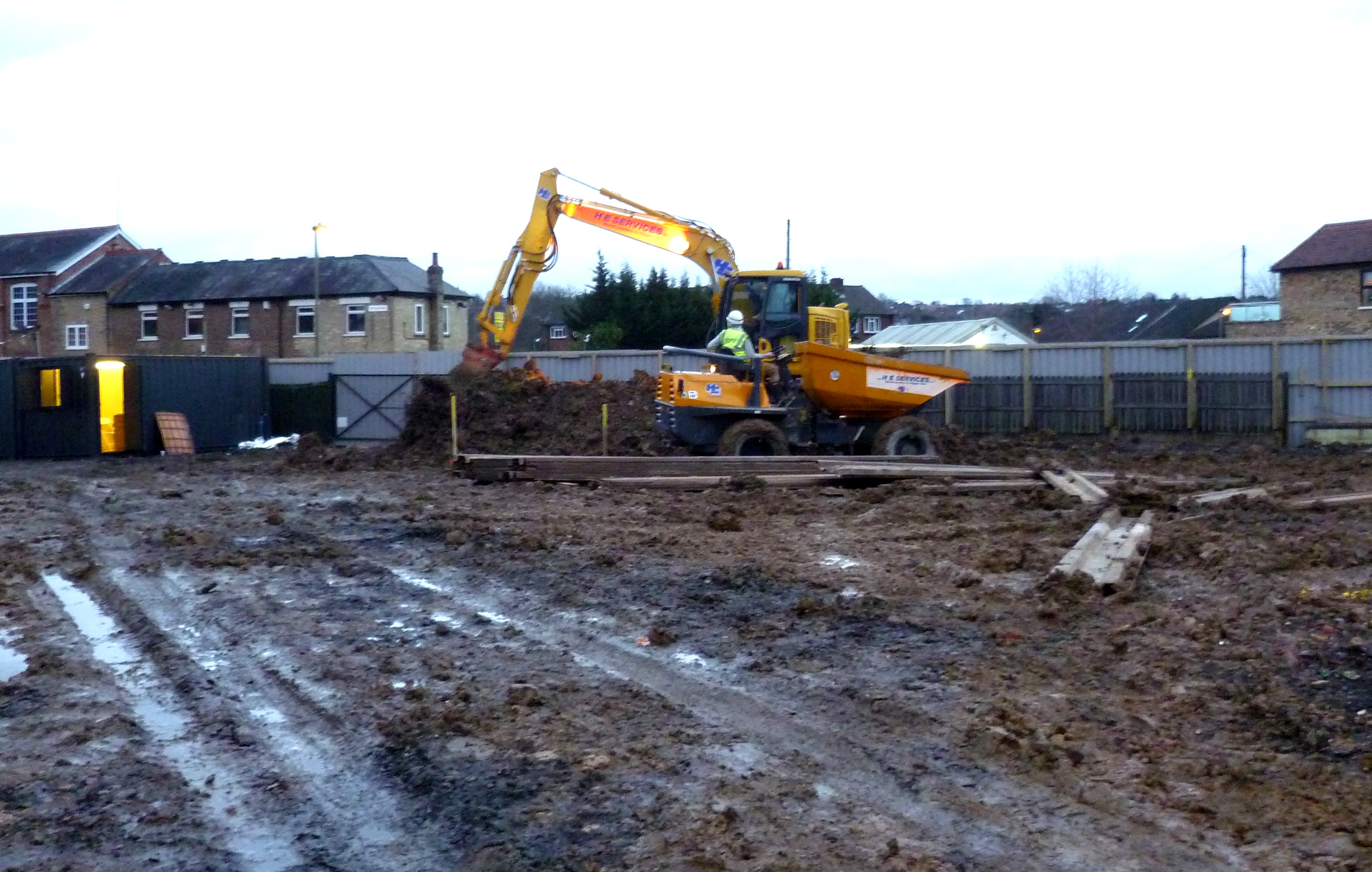
Working on the site where The Alexandra once stood, December 2015.

The Alexandra closed in 2013. In 2014, the Save New Barnet Campaign reported that the site owner, Optic Realm, had applied to demolish the pub and replace it with 15 apartments. The pub was demolished in October or November 2015.

The 15 flats were completed in February 2017.
