= Irish Pub, Kabul =

Pub in Kabul, Afghanistan

The Irish Pub of Kabul was a pub in Kabul, Afghanistan; it opened on Saint Patrick's Day, 2003.

Owner Sean Martin McQuade received approval of a local mullah by promising to repair the road adjacent to the club and assist in relocating a nearby school to a larger site. The pub is licensed by the Afghan government, with the caveat that it not sell alcohol to Afghans. When interviewed a staff member of the bar commented, "Our families know what we do, but we tell other people we just work in a restaurant or a guesthouse selling food and soft drinks." Within 2 months of opening it received warnings of a possible attack and temporarily closed. By September of the next year the bar had moved into a Kabul hotel.
