= Marie's Rip Tide Lounge =

Former bar in Chicago

Coordinates: 41.917753°N 87.672418°W

Marie's Rip Tide lounge was a late-night Bucktown lounge and dive-bar.

It had garnered national attention numerous times, most recently by its appearance on Late Night with Conan O'Brien, where he referred to it as his "favorite Chicago bar". Marie's was open until 4 am on weekends and was known for its pickled eggs and Old Style sold by the six-pack.

Marie's closed in August 2013.

Marie's was filmed in an episode of the 1980s drama Crime Story, and was the subject of songs including Robbie Fulks' "Marie's Riptide" and Michael McDermott's "20 Miles South of Nowhere".

== Honors ==
- Editorial Winner for Best Dive Bar in Citysearch: Chicago's annual poll (2000)
- Editorial Winner for Best Jukebox (Citysearch 2001)
- Editorial Winner for Best Bar to Celebrate the Holidays (Citysearch 2001)
- Top After-Hours Bar by Digital City Chicago (2002)
- One of Citysearch's Top 10 Taverns in the US (2002)
