= Gambaro Group =

Australian hospitality group

Gambaro
- Type: Private
- Industry: Hospitality
- Founded: 1953; 73 years ago
- Founder: Giovanbaptista Gambaro
- Headquarters: 33 Caxton Street, Petrie Terrace, Brisbane, Queensland, Australia
- Area served: Brisbane, Australia
- Key people: Dominic Gambaro; Michael Gambaro; John Gambaro
- Services: Seafood restaurant, boutique hotel, bar, events and function venues
- Number of employees: 51-200

Gambaro is an Australian hospitality group headquartered in Brisbane, Queensland and founded in 1953. The group was passed from founder Giovanbaptista Gambaro to sons Michael and Domenico, who opened the Gambaro Seafood Restaurant in 1974. It is the oldest established restaurant in Brisbane. Currently, the Gambaro Group comprises businesses including the Gambaro Restaurant, Black Hide Steakhouse, Persone, the Gambaro Hotel, MG Bar, and Function Centre.

== History ==
The first Gambaro establishment opened in Brisbane in 1953. It started as a family business by Giovanbaptista Gambaro, an Italian immigrant who moved to Australia in 1938 and settled in North Queensland. In the late 1940s, his family also migrated and started working with him. In 1953, Giovanbaptista started a fish and chips shop along with his sons Domenico and Michael at a seafood wholesale site in South Brisbane. In 1974, Michael co-founded Gambaro Seafood Restaurant with his brother Domeico, which became a fine dining restaurant in Brisbane, as well as a network of wholesale and retail seafood export business. Gambaro restaurant is now run by third generation sons John, Frank, and Donny Gambaro. In 2013, the family added to their property portfolio with Black Hide Steakhouse across the road, and in 2014, a boutique hotel. They also included a bar and function centre for hosting events and conferences.

== Services ==
=== Gambaro Seafood Restaurant ===
Established in 1974, the Gambaro Seafood Restaurant serves mud crab, lobster, and barramundi dishes invented by Michael Gambaro. In 2012, the restaurant was featured at the Caterer of the Year awards and was named the best seafood restaurant in Brisbane.

Gambaro Hotel Brisbane

On the 1 May 2014, Gambaro Hotel Brisbane opened on Caxton Street along with the Gambaro Seafood Restaurant and Function Centre. The 68-room luxury boutique hotel is designed by Hirsch Bedner Associates and offers nine different room types. It is only five-star luxury accommodation available in the area of Lang Park and Paddington. The third level of the hotel has a Sunset Lounge terrace that is available for dinners. In addition to this, all rooms have the Appelles Black Label amenities to the Gambaro Hotel. The hotel received QHA Awards for Excellence as the "Best New Accommodation Hotel in Queensland" in October 2014. In July 2022, it was sold to the Australian Rugby League Commission.

=== Black Hide Steakhouse ===
The Gambaro owners opened a new restaurant on the Caxton Street in June 2013. Initially it launched as Cut Steakhouse & Tapas and soon changed its title to Black Hide Steakhouse. The Steakhouse was named Restaurant of the Year at the 2014 Restaurant & Catering Awards for Excellence, held at the Brisbane Convention and Exhibition Centre. It also received Queensland's Best Steak Restaurant award in a row in 2014 and 2015 at the Queensland Restaurant & Catering Awards for Excellence. It received national recognition, winning Australia's Best Steak Restaurant at National Restaurant & Catering Awards for Excellence in 2014.
