= Lucky Lou's =

Bar located in college town of Denton, Texas

Coordinates: 33.2145°N 97.1454°W

- Interactive map of Lucky Lou's

Restaurant information
- Established: October 17, 1996; 29 years ago
- Dress code: Casual
- Location: 1207 W Hickory St, Denton, United States, Texas, 76201
- Website: luckylous.com

Lucky Lou's is a bar located in the college town of Denton, Texas.

Opened in 1996, Lou's established itself as popular bar in the area. Lou's has three separate bar serving areas, foosball tables, arcade games and pool tables. There is a large outdoor patio area that faces out to the Fry Street area. Lou's had a beer specifically created for it by Franconia Brewing Company called "Lucky 7". The bar has been visited by the ESPN Street Team and hosted the official 2010 playoff berth party for FC Dallas and its players.
