= Zum Weinberg =

- Native name: Gastro GmbH zum Weinberg
- Industry: Restaurant
- Founded: 1354
- Headquarters: Hinter dem Rathaus 3, 23966 Wismar, Germany
- Key people: Marco und Martina Pusceddu
- Website: www.steaks-n-more-wismar.de

Zum Weinberg is a traditional wine tavern founded in 1354 and located in the historic center of Wismar city, Mecklenburg-Vorpommern federal state in northern Germany.

In the 20th century the restaurant was reconstructed and the guest rooms were created from the hall and on the first floor.

== See also ==
- List of oldest companies
