= Ordinaire (wine bar) =

Wine bar, wine shop, and bistro-style restaurant

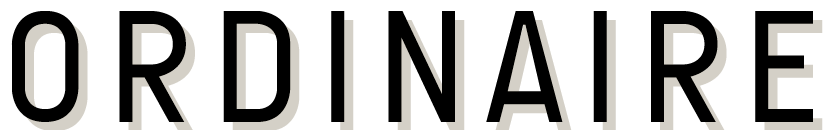

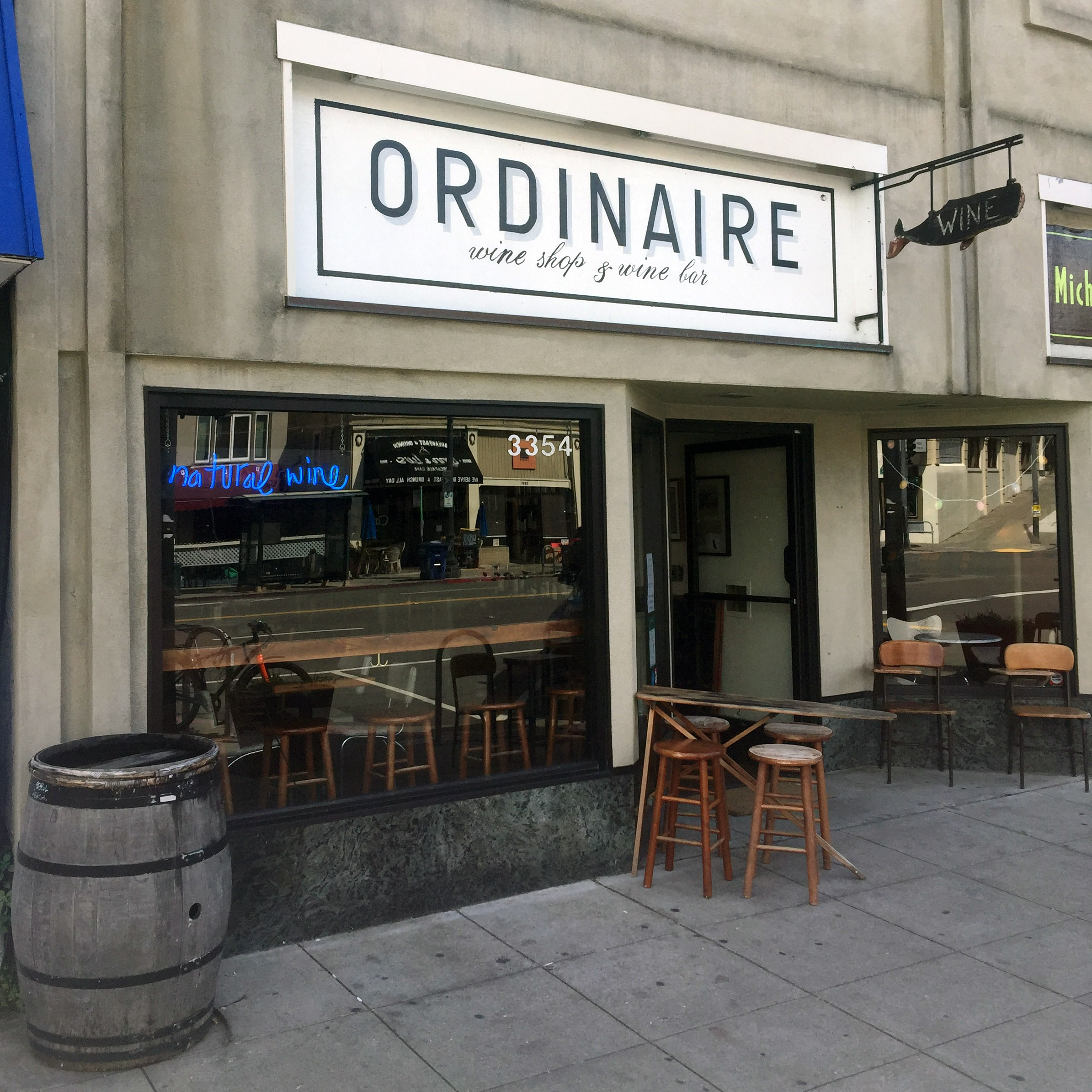
- Ordinaire's storefront on Grand Avenue
- Interactive map of Ordinaire

Restaurant information
- Established: August 22, 2013
- Owner: Bradford Taylor
- Location: 3354 Grand Avenue, Oakland, Alameda, California, 94610, United States
- Coordinates: 37°48′48.8″N 122°14′47.1″W
- Website: ordinairewine.com

Ordinaire is a wine bar, wine shop, and bistro-style restaurant in the Grand Lake District of Oakland, California. Ordinaire specializes in selling natural wine produced from organic grapes with minimal chemical and technological intervention. Owner Bradford Taylor opened Ordinaire in September 2013. Taylor is also an organizer of an annual natural wine festival in Oakland called Brumaire, which has held events at Ordinaire.

Ordinaire periodically partners with chefs to open as a pop-up restaurant called Bistro Ordinaire. Food and wine critics have praised Ordinaire for its selection of wines and hip yet unpretentious atmosphere. Amid a wave of interest in natural wine in the United States, Ordinaire has helped to establish Oakland as a natural wine hub. The shop has been described as an important site for natural wine culture within the East Bay, the San Francisco Bay Area, the West Coast, and the United States as a whole.

== Ordinaire and natural wine ==
Ordinaire exclusively stocks and sells natural wine. Owner Bradford Taylor modeled Ordinaire after the caves à manger—small natural wine shops that serve food—he encountered while living in Paris, particularly Le Verre Volé, Le Chateaubriand, and Le Baratin. "Natural wine" does not have a precise formal or legal definition; however, the term is generally accepted to mean wine produced from organically farmed or biodynamic grapes, without the use (or at least, minimal use) of filtration or additives (except for preservative sulfites, which are still often avoided). Taylor has said "there's something productive about how nebulous the term 'natural' is, how it opens itself up to debate every time it comes up."

Ordinaire has helped to promote natural wine in the Bay Area and the United States generally, and has become an Oakland destination for tourists. Chaney Kwak of The Guardian cited Ordinaire in an article arguing that Oakland was becoming a "New Brooklyn" and a "creative capital to rival" San Francisco. According to Jordan Michelman at Sprudge, there is "no one true home for natural wine in America ... But there are certain addresses that help define the culture here, and among them there's none more important on the west coast than that of Oakland's Ordinaire. ... [Taylor's] vision and influence at the helm of Ordinaire has helped define natural wine in America." Luke Tsai of the East Bay Express said Taylor was "doing God's work in helping dispense with the notion that wine shops are all stuffy, intimidating places frequented only by the rich."

== History ==
Location of Ordinaire in Oakland

Taylor opened Ordinaire while he was a doctoral candidate at UC Berkeley, writing his dissertation on the sense of taste in modernist literature. Taylor and his wife Nicole Betenia rented the building, a 3,000-sq ft former gym, and began renovations in October 2012. The shop was originally going to be named The Red Whale, but was renamed shortly before opening when Taylor received a cease-and-desist letter from a coffee business with the same name. The name Ordinaire was chosen after the French term vin ordinaire, which refers to everyday, "ordinary" wines that skip bottling to be served by winemakers among their friends, typically in a bistro setting.

Ordinaire had a soft opening in August 2013 and its grand opening in September. The shop is located on Grand Avenue in the Grand Lake District, a neighborhood of Oakland located at the northwest corner of Lake Merritt. Taylor chose the location because it was less expensive than many of the city's other, better-established commercial districts; he also said he "thought it was ridiculous that this part of Oakland didn't have a shop that was an alternative to Trader Joe's and Whole Foods."

=== Brumaire Natural Wine Festival ===
Taylor helps organize the Brumaire Natural Wine Festival, an annual Oakland-based natural wine festival that began in 2016. Brumaire was inspired by wine-tasting salons and festivals in Europe and has featured wines from California, France, Italy, and Spain. Events at Brumaire have been hosted at Ordinaire itself, with other events hosted at nearby bars and restaurants. By its third year in 2018, Brumaire hosted 51 wineries and 500 attendants.

== Food and Bistro Ordinaire ==
Ordinaire serves small sides for wine and food matching like cheese, charcuterie, and sardines. Ordinaire periodically opens as a pop-up restaurant called Bistro Ordinaire.

For several years, Ordinaire partnered with the nearby pizzeria Boot & Shoe Service to serve pizza at the bar. In January 2018, Ordinaire discontinued the partnership after Boot & Shoe's owner was accused of sexual harassment by 17 former employees.

== Reception ==
Within a year of its grand opening, Ordinaire received positive reviews in Eater San Francisco, San Jose Mercury News, SF Weekly, Oakland Local, Wine & Spirits, The San Francisco Examiner, and Saveur. In December 2013, Eater named Ordinaire one of the 19 "hottest" wine bars to open in the United States (plus one in Montreal) in the preceding year. Ordinaire has been listed as one of the best wine bars in the United States by Thrillist (in 2014), Bon Appétit (in 2015), and Food & Wine (in 2017). In 2018, Esquire named Ordinaire one of the 21 best bars in the United States.

== See also ==
- Natural wine
- Organic wine
- Biodynamic wine
- California wine
