= Abbey Lounge =

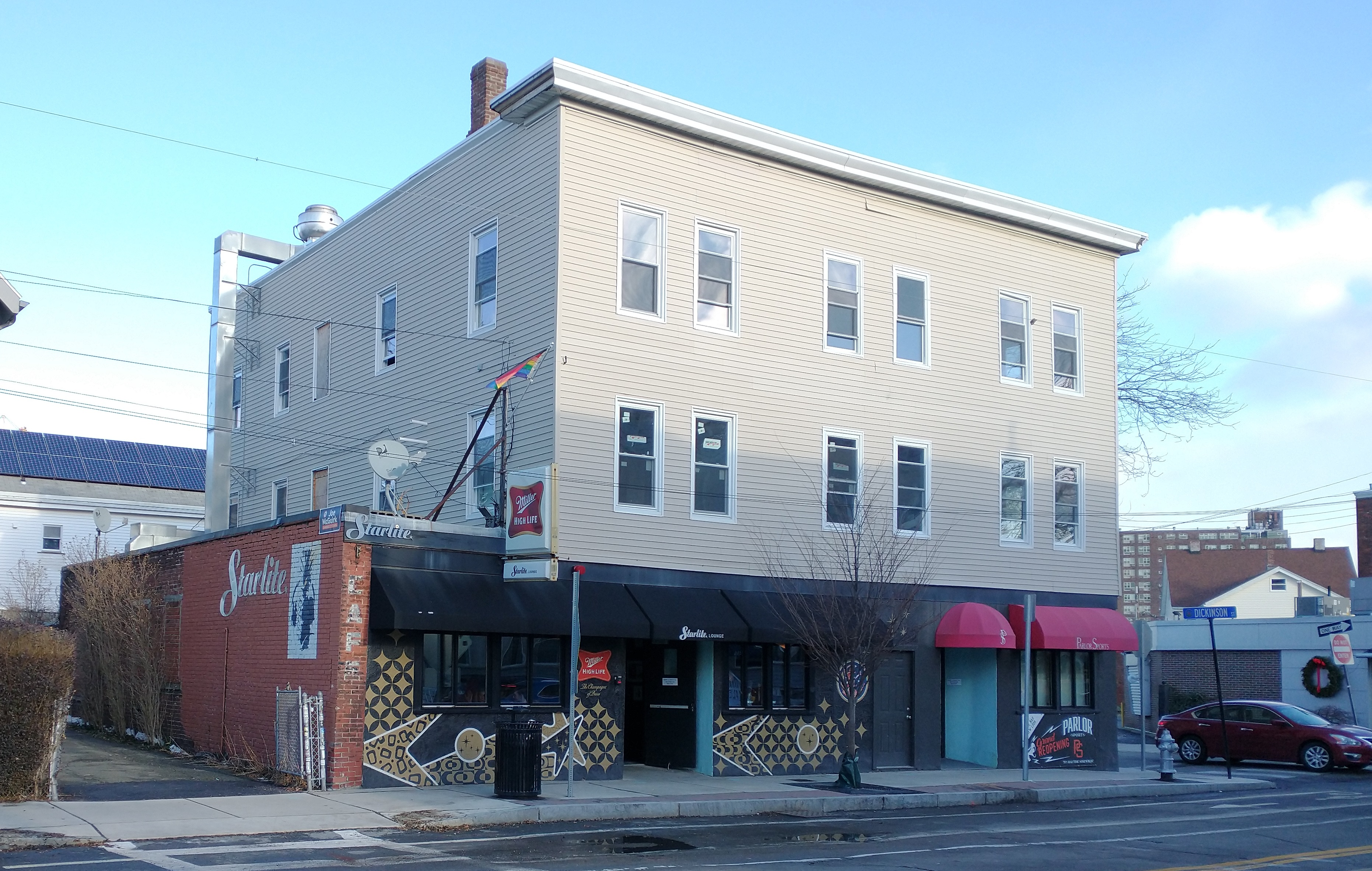
- Trina's Starlite Lounge is at the former location of Abbey Lounge.

- Location within Boston

Restaurant information
- Established: 1933
- Closed: November 2007
- Location: 3 Beacon Street, Somerville, Massachusetts
- Coordinates: 42°22′28″N 71°6′6″W

The Abbey Lounge was a dive bar and nightclub in Inman Square in Somerville, Massachusetts. First opened in 1907, it didn't become officially established until after prohibition ended in 1933. It closed in November 2008. Following its closure, the location was purchased by new owners, renovated and reopened in 2009 as Trina's Starlight Lounge.

The first of many of the original "Abbey bands" to enter the scene was SCHNOCKERED, debuting at the Abbey Lounge every other Wednesday night beginning in March 1998 until the first official weekend production featuring headliners heavy stud, May 1, 1999.
