= Tiki Boyd's =

Former tiki bar in Denver, Colorado

Coordinates: 39°44′23″N 104°58′21″W

- Type: Tiki bar
- Founded: 2005
- Founder: Boyd Rice
- Headquarters: Denver, Colorado, United States
- Area served: Capitol Hill (Denver)
- Parent: Ramada Denver Downtown

Tiki Boyd's was a tiki bar in Denver, Colorado, in operation from 2005 to 2006. Experimental sound/noise musician Boyd Rice designed the bar, revamping the bar originally known as the East Coast Bar located in the Ramada Denver Downtown. A tiki enthusiast, Rice provided art from his personal collection for the bar. Rice is also a tiki scholar, having written an essay for Martin McIntosh's book, Taboo: The Art of Tiki. Lorin Partridge, a friend of Rice, tended the bar, and the bar was known for a drink called a Bronze Serpent. The music was played exclusively from vinyl, including records by Martin Denny and Arthur Lyman, also from Rice's collection.

== Location ==
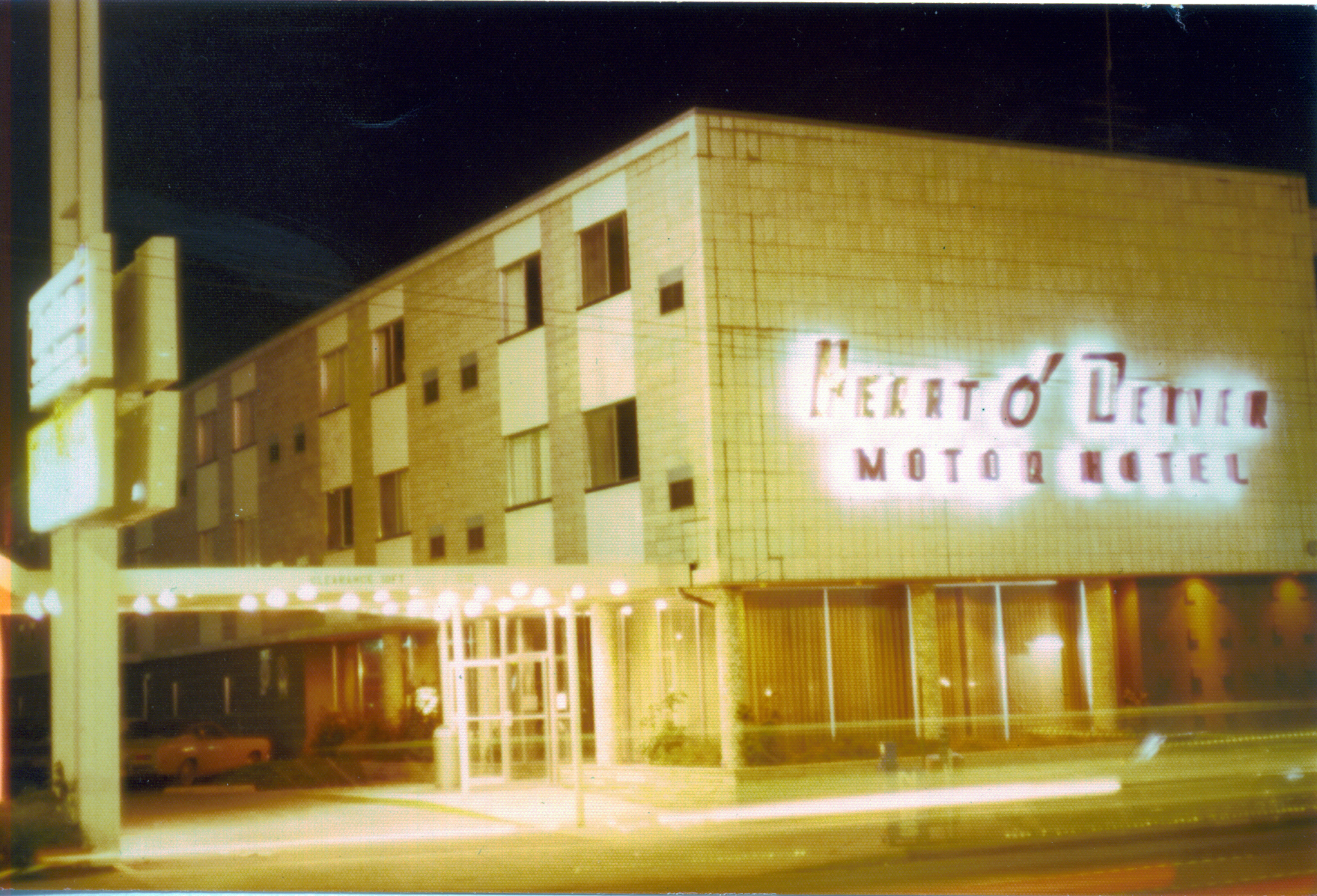
Heart o' Denver Motor Hotel in August 1975

Historically, the site of the Ramada in which Tiki Boyd's was located used to be the Heart o' Denver Motor Hotel (1960–1975), which featured a bar called the Tiki Bar. Eli Hedley, the man who popularized the beachcomber aesthetic, designed the tiki lounge at the motor hotel. The site is also historically noteworthy for being located on Colfax Avenue, the longest commercial street in the United States.

== Closure ==
Tiki Boyd's changed names, themes, and management in early 2006, when Boyd Rice withdrew his support, decorations, and music collection from the bar.
