= Tobacco Road (bar) =

Coordinates: 25.767815°N 80.193502°W

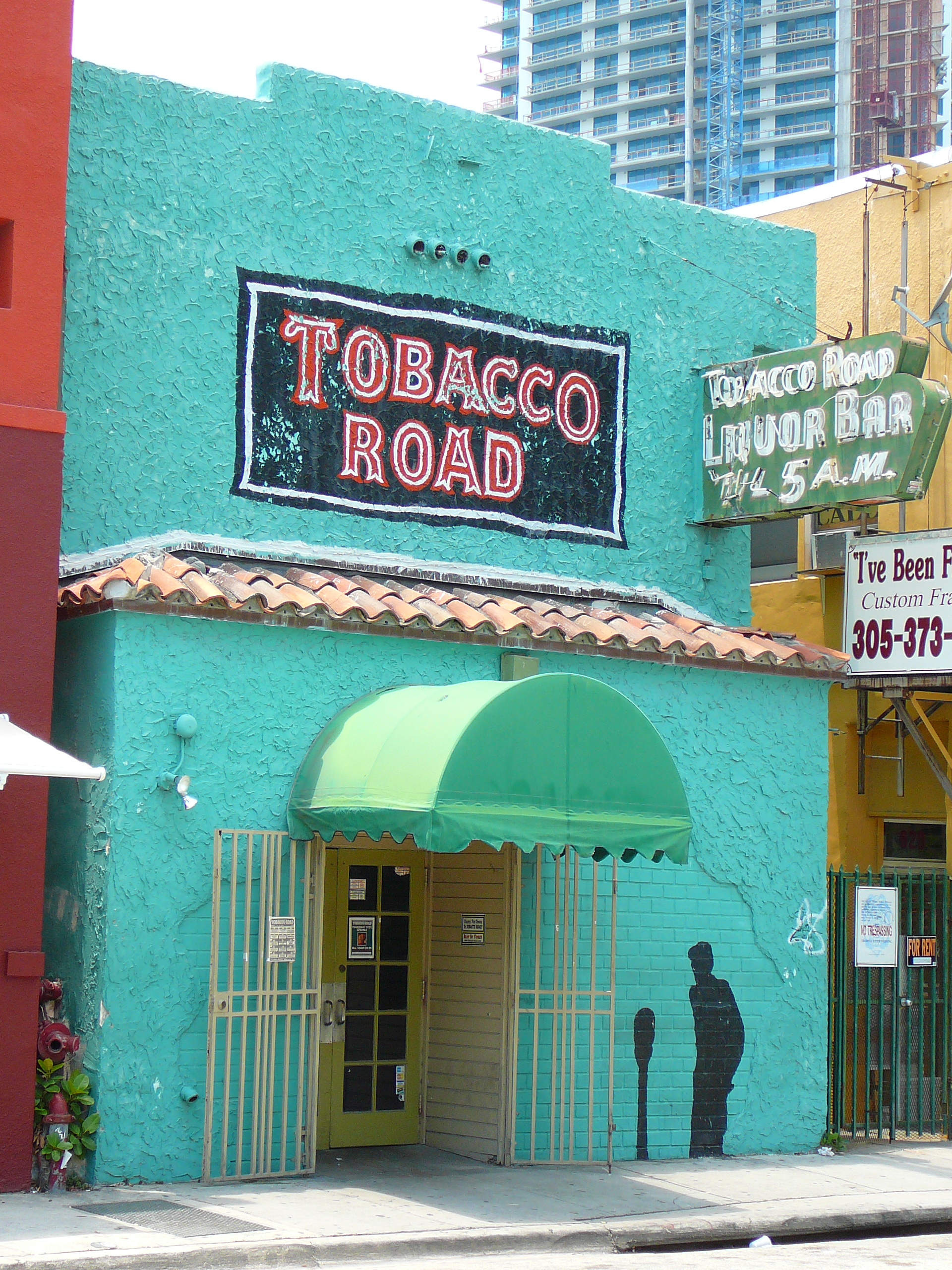
Tobacco Road in May 2008

The Tobacco Road was a bar in the Brickell area of Downtown Miami, Florida. It was located at 626 South Miami Avenue, on the south side of the Miami River, putting it in Miami's Brickell district, where it was classified as a classic dive bar, being popular among locals.

== Overview ==
Tobacco Road was popularly known as the oldest bar in the city. The liquor license it amended was first issued in November 1912 (though property records show the building as being built in 1915, as a bakery) and operated nearly continuously since its opening, having been shut down briefly at times for run-ins with the law, such as when the upstairs, now a live music venue, was used as a speakeasy during Prohibition.

Tobacco Road celebrated its 100th anniversary in November 2012. In 2012, the land on which Tobacco Road lies was purchased for $12.5 million. On October 26, 2014, Tobacco Road closed and was demolished by Thunder Demolition Inc. An estimated 4,000 people came on its last night.

== Relocation ==
In April 2012, developer Carlos Mattos purchased the large lot which included Tobacco Road, though it was stated that Tobacco Road had a three-year lease and could remain open for at least that long before the lot was developed. In 2014, the bar's owners announced that they were planning on selling the bar to its employees, regardless of whether or not demolition was imminent, and relocating to another building nearby. The bar closed on the morning of October 26 with plans to relocate to another building in the same block. In October 2015, Norwegian Cruise Line's Norwegian Escape began service from PortMiami, with the ship including a bar named "Tobacco Road", which was "reimagined as a fancy cigar bar".

== See also ==
- The Trap (bar)

== Gallery ==
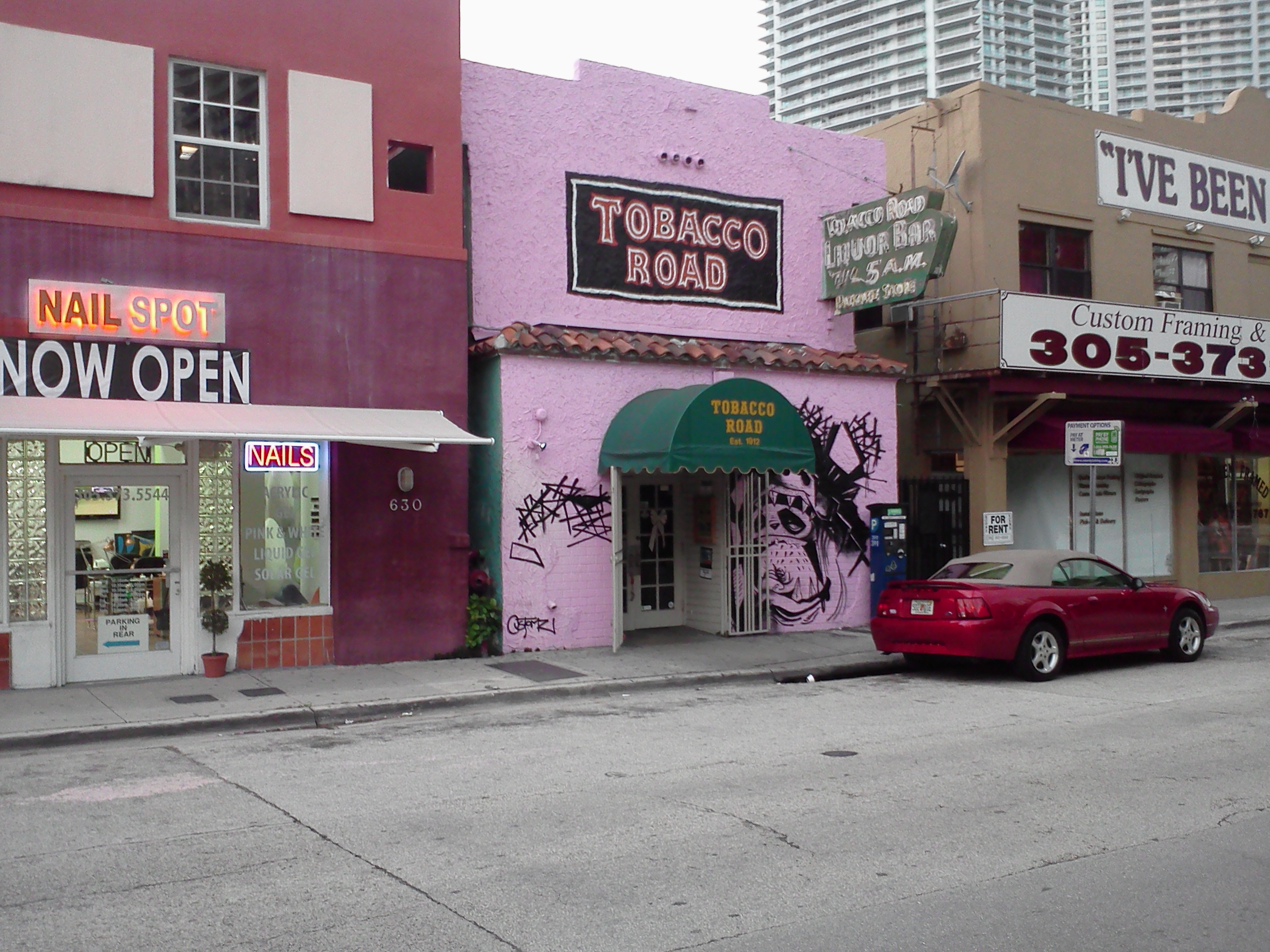
Tobacco Road in 2011 painted pink for Breast Cancer Awareness Month

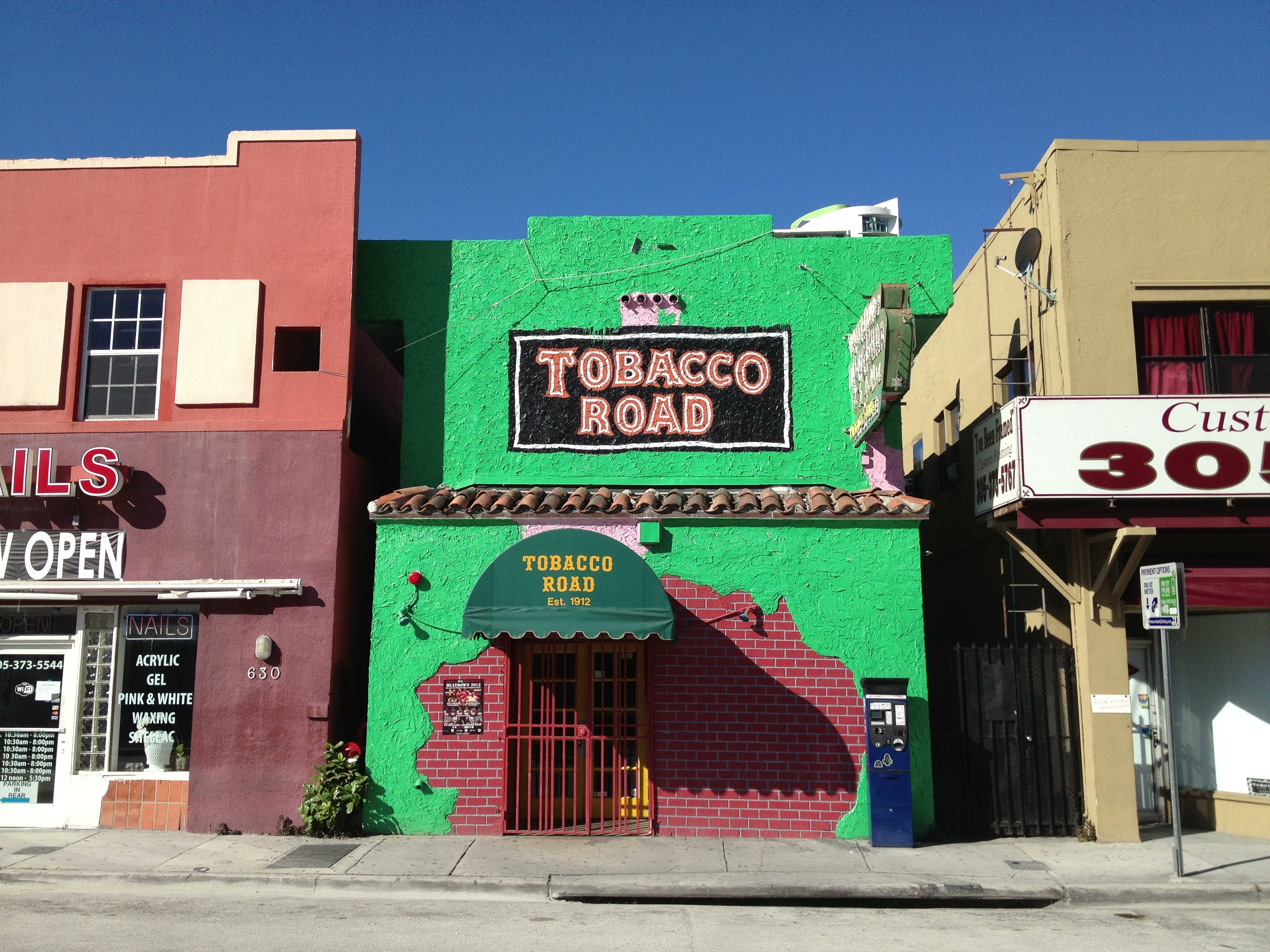
Back to its more traditional color in 2012

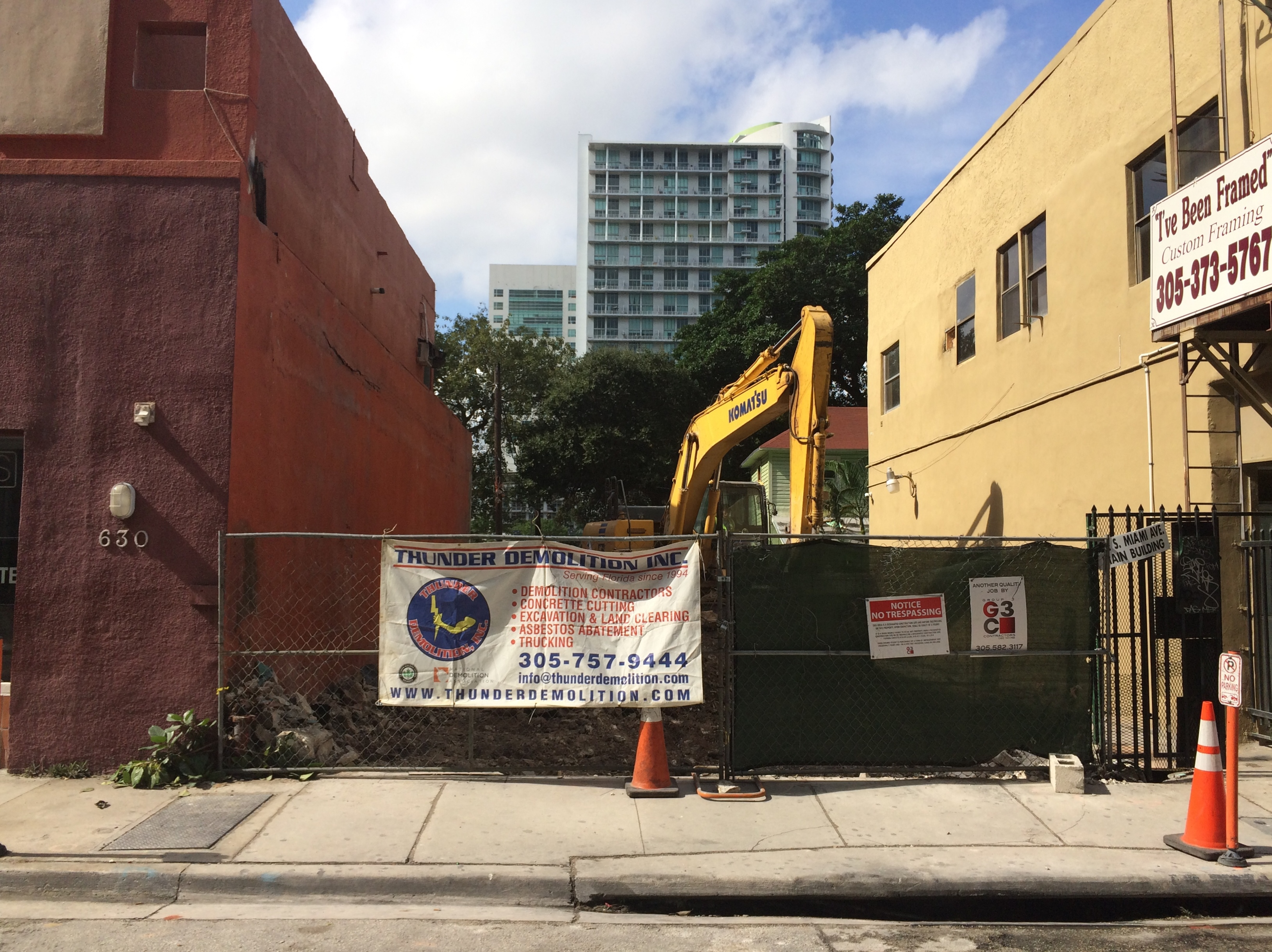
Demolition in 2014, one year before building would have turned 100
