= Nick's Original Big Train Bar =

Saloon based in New Orleans

Coordinates: 29.9599°N 90.0872°W

Nick's Original Big Train Bar was a saloon based in New Orleans.

== History ==
Nick's Original Big Train Bar was originally established as a grocery in 1918 by Nicholas G. "Mr. Nick" Castrogiovanni (1893–1979). Located at 2400 Tulane Avenue across the street from the Dixie Brewing Company, Nick's Bar operated until Hurricane Katrina on August 29, 2005. The bar was opened after Prohibition ended. The business grew to include the bar, an Italian grocery and delicatessen, liquor store, and beer garden. In September 1965 Hurricane Betsy damaged the property and only the bar remained.

Mr. Nick was well known in New Orleans as "a mixologist." He was best known for the Pousse-Café, in which liqueurs are layered by specific gravity, and he was known to have layered 34 different liqueurs in a small Pousse-Café glass. (The challenge in pouring a Pousse-Café would be to do so slowly, to assure that liqueurs "stack" and do not mix.)

The bar was called the "Big Train" because Nick was known to purchase liquor by the trainload in the 1930s, at a time when other bars didn't do so. A mural depicting a fast-moving train, modern for the time and passing a "Dixie 45" road sign, presided over the bar.

Mr. Nick developed a reputation as a raconteur and showman, and enjoyed entertaining patrons with demonstrations, regularly offering samples of drinks after pouring the main glasses from the metal shaker.

The Big Train Bar was known not only for Mr. Nick's Pousse-Café, but also for his other mixed drinks, many of which featured liqueurs hand-shaken with whole cream. The drink menu eventually totaled over 150 drinks, often with names like the "Pregnant Canary" and "Between the Sheets," in addition to the "Banana Banshee," "Ruptured Duck," "Wedding Cake," and "Chocolate Soldier."

After Castrogiovanni's death, additional drinks were devised such as, the "Underwater Demolition," "Nick's Bullet" and "War Eagle" ( although many remember it from when Nick was alive) with subsequent more overtly pornographic names ("1-800-****-ME UP," "Twisted Nipple," "Screaming Orgasm," "12 Italian Virgins in the Back Seat of A Volkswagen," "Peeking Through Grass Skirts," "A Wild Night At The Capri Motel" [a reference to the motel next door on Tulane Avenue], and names referencing undergarments).

The Dixie Brewery, across Tulane Avenue from the bar, added "45" to their "Dixie" beer brand name after Castrogiovanni told the brewmaster that it "had the kick of a Colt 45," resulting in the New Orleans favorite, "Dixie 45" beer.

Nick's Original Big Train Bar was frequented by Dixie brewery employees, blue collar workers, businessmen, Tulane and LSU Medical School faculty, college, medical, and law students, tourists, politicians, and movie stars.

The Paramount Pictures distributorship had been located across Tulane Avenue, and movie stars and celebrities including John Steinbeck, Ernest Hemingway, and Laurel and Hardy had visited the bar.

In its later years, the bar developed a reputation as a "dive bar". The atmosphere changed considerably under managers after Mr. Nick's death in 1979, as the character of the bar became wildly unrestrained without Mr. Nick's firm control of behavior in his establishment. Promotional "All You Can Drink" nights were featured, with some drinks served in outrageous containers such as a miniature toilet bowl. Well-attended, especially by college fraternities and sororities, busloads arrived from as far away as Mississippi. At one time in the 1980s, Mothers Against Drunk Driving (MADD) took a public stance against the Nick's Bar "All You Can Drink" nights.

During the 1960s and 1970s, Nick's was a college and graduate school hang out. The drinking age in New Orleans at the time was 18. Students from Tulane and Loyola Universities, Tulane and LSU medical schools, and all the fraternities and sororities in the city gathered for drinks. On weekends, the bar was packed. There was an art to making your way up to the bar and then ordering for all your friends.

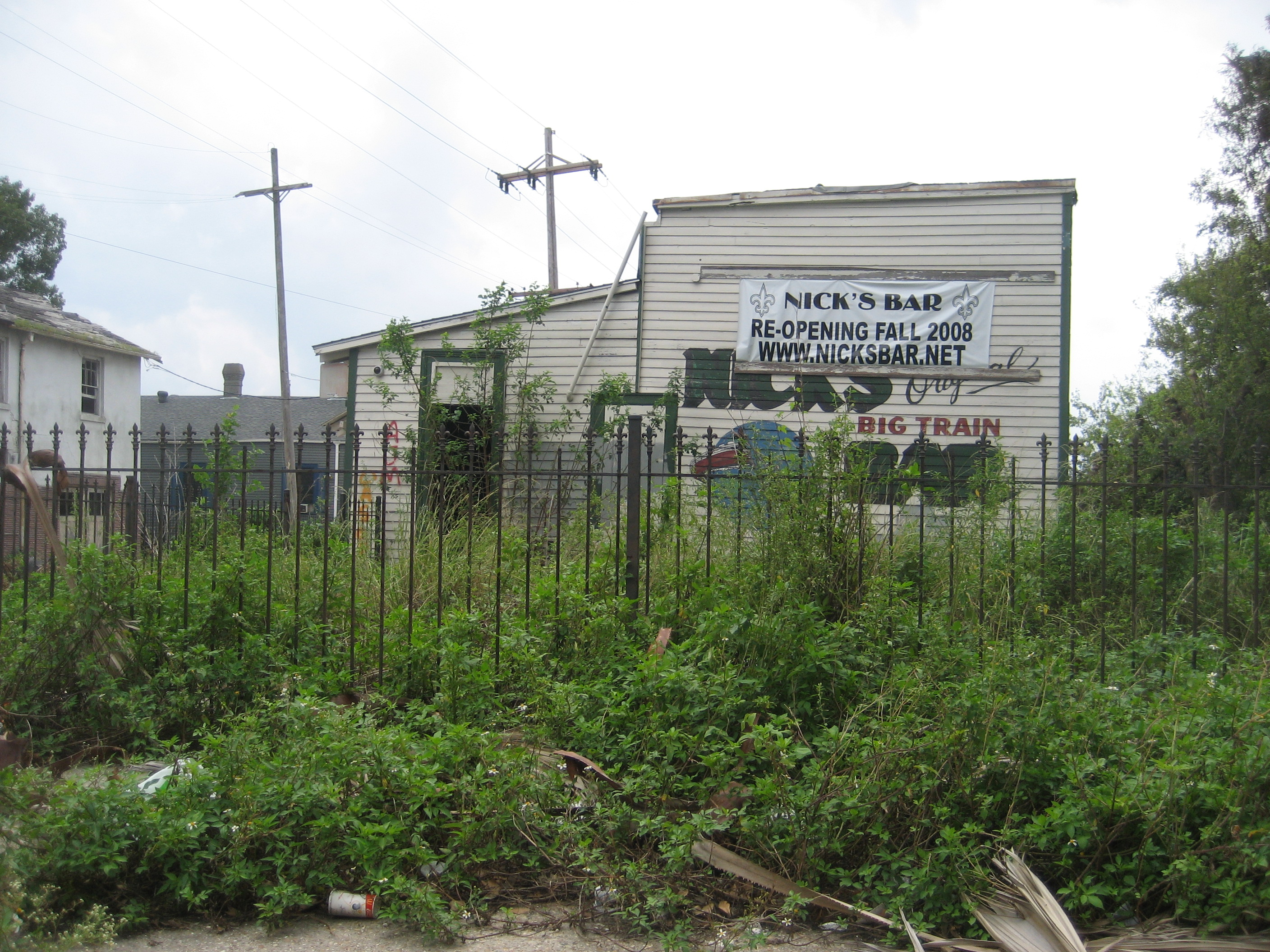
The building derelict since 2005, photographed in 2008 with a sign promising reopening later that year.

Eventually, Nick's Original Big Train Bar was purchased by Nick's grandson, but the bar was destroyed by water during Hurricane Katrina and was later demolished. Repeated plans to reopen or rebuild the bar have appeared on various news sites and elsewhere since soon after the disaster, but As of 2024 remain unrealized.

== See also ==
- Dixie Brewing Company – a New Orleans regional brewery
