= Jardin Tiki =

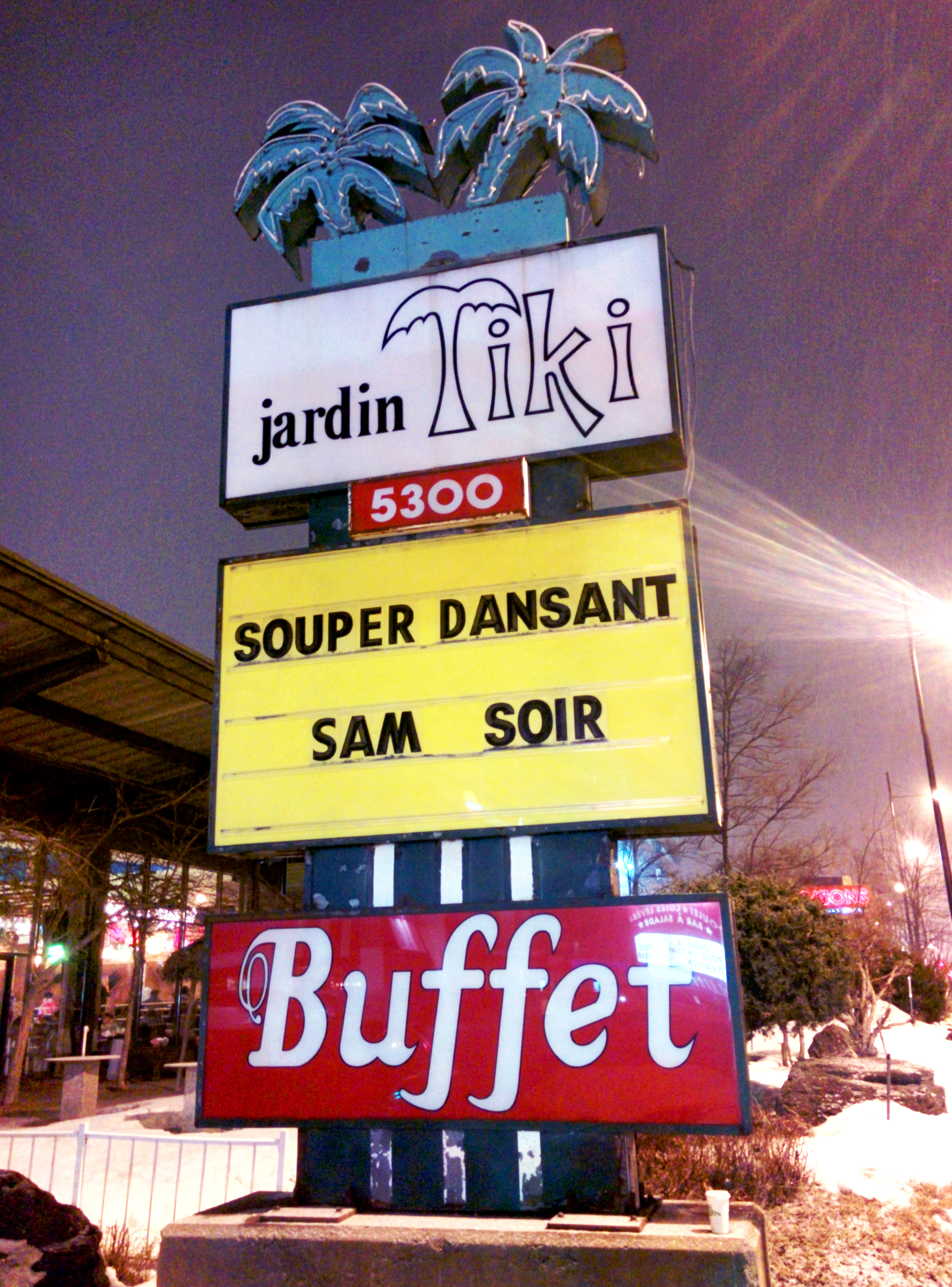
- Jardin Tiki's marquee

- Location within Montreal

Restaurant information
- Established: 1986
- Closed: March 28, 2015
- Owner: Danny Chan
- Food type: Canadian Chinese cuisine
- Dress code: Casual
- Location: 5300 Sherbrooke Street East, Quebec, H1V 1A1, Canada
- Coordinates: 45.568148°N 73.552645°W
- Website: jardintiki.com (archive)

Jardin Tiki was a tiki-themed buffet restaurant established in 1986 in Montreal, Quebec, Canada, and closed 28 March 2015.

== History ==
Jardin Tiki was opened by Douglas Chan, a Chinese immigrant who arrived in Montreal in the 1950s and worked as a waiter at Kon-Tiki, a renowned tiki-themed restaurant located from 1958 to 1981 at 1455 Peel Street, at the former Mount Royal Hotel in downtown Montreal. Chan, who left Kon-Tiki in the 1970s, opened his first restaurant Tiki Doré in 1974 at 6976 Sherbrooke Street East in Montreal. Chan bought back many elements of the Kon-Tiki restaurant's decor at an auction sale held after the Kon-Tiki restaurant's closure in 1981, in order to use them in another more spacious restaurant that he wanted to open. He founded a new business on 14 February 1985 and the following year opened his second restaurant Jardin Tiki (literally Tiki Garden) with the help of then co-owners Albert Wong and Paul Yee, in a former car dealership. Chan sold the Tiki Doré restaurant in 1990. The Tiki Doré restaurant closed in January 2000.

Jardin Tiki was located at 5300 Sherbrooke Street East in Montreal, facing the Olympic Village in the Hochelaga-Maisonneuve district. It was noted for its kitsch Polynesian decor, its large atrium filled with tropical plants and its pond with live turtles. It got rave reviews in James Teitelbaum's book on the pop-Polynesian phenomenon Tiki Road Trip. The all-you-can-eat buffet served Canadian Chinese cuisine.

Danny Chan, son of Douglas Chan, who died in 2002, took over his father's business. According to its last owner, the only day Jardin Tiki had been closed was the day of his father's funeral.

== Closure ==
The Jardin Tiki closed on 28 March 2015. The land and building (including the decor) were purchased by retirement-home mogul Eddy Savoie of Résidences Soleil to make way for a new retirement residence to be built on the site.

== Significance ==
Scenes from the 1998 film C't'à ton tour, Laura Cadieux, the 2006 René Lévesque television miniseries and the 2008 movie Truffles (Truffe) by Kim Nguyen, were shot at Jardin Tiki.

At the time of its closing in 2015, the Jardin Tiki was the last tiki-themed restaurant remaining in Montreal and one of a handful of tiki establishments in Quebec. A notable survivor is the Hôtel Motel Coconut in Trois-Rivières.

== Gallery ==
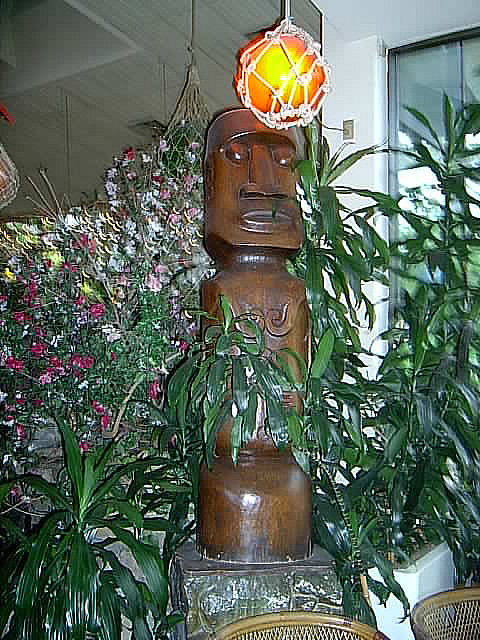
Tiki statue, 2004

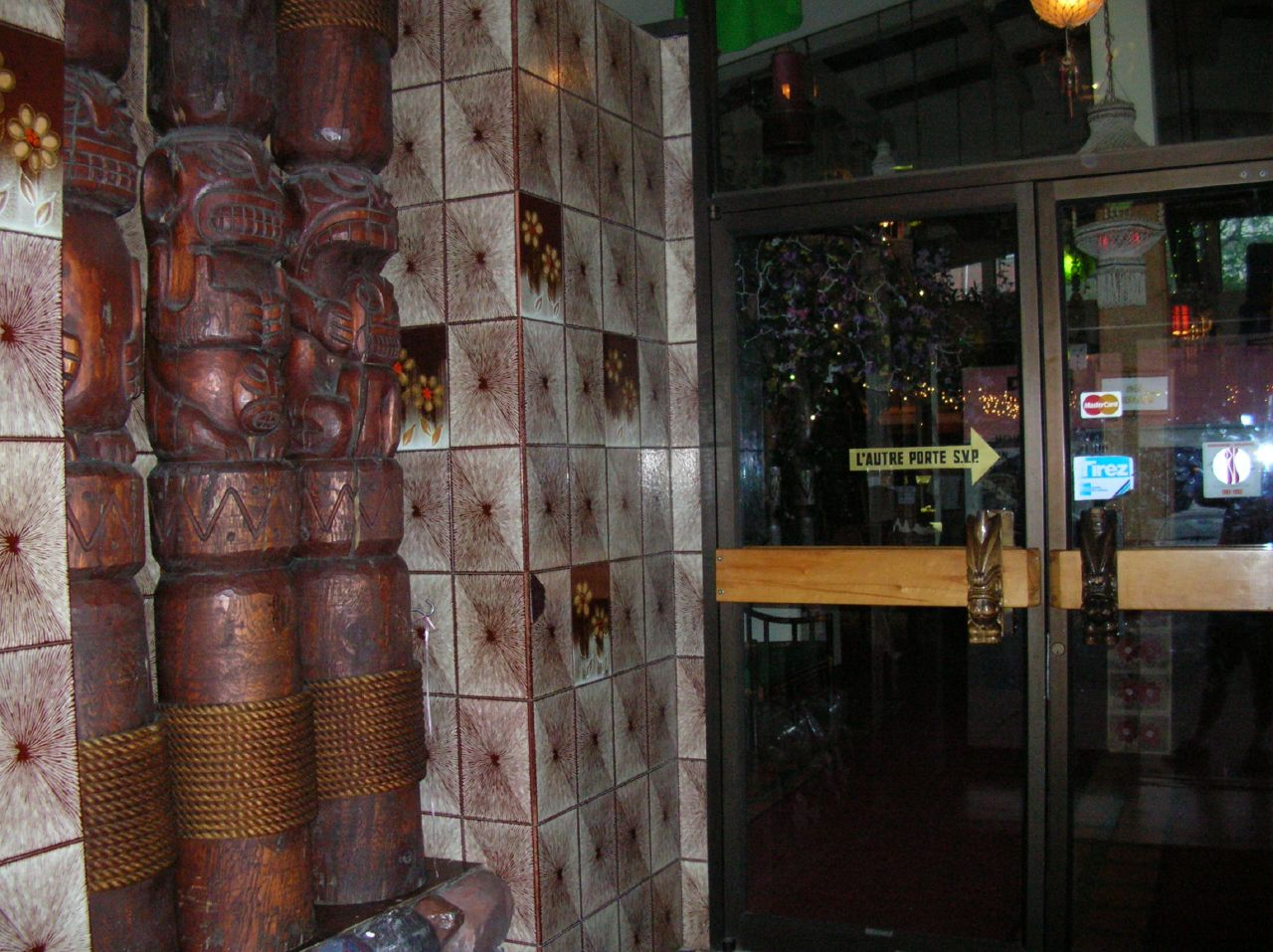
Entryway, 2005

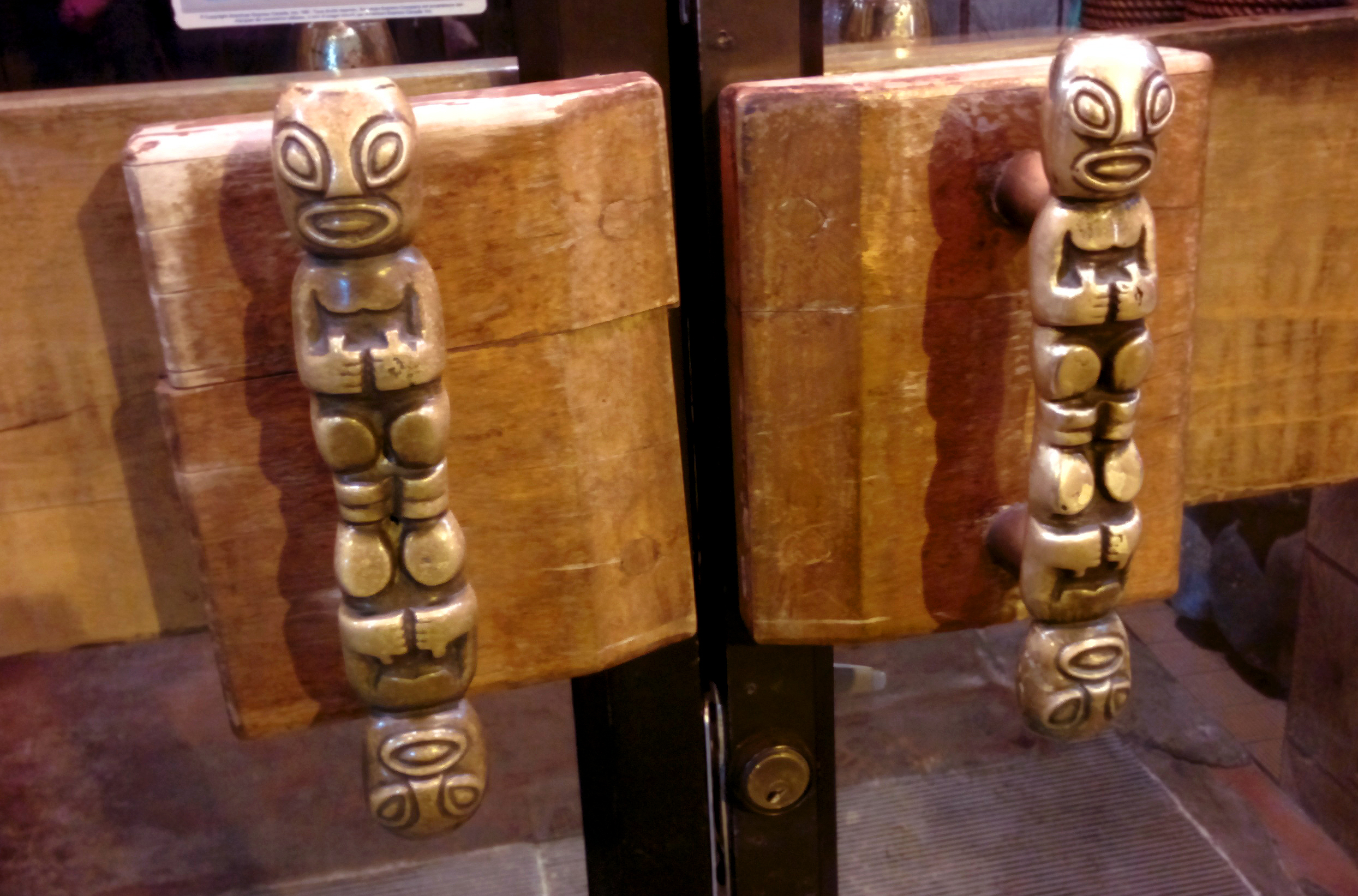
Tiki-themed door handles

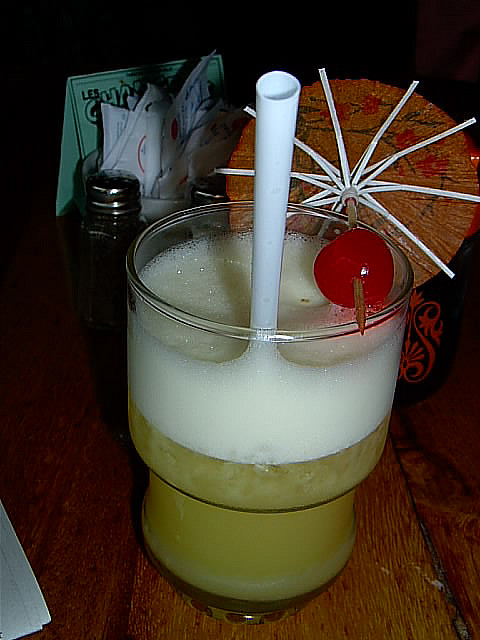
A cocktail at Jardin Tiki

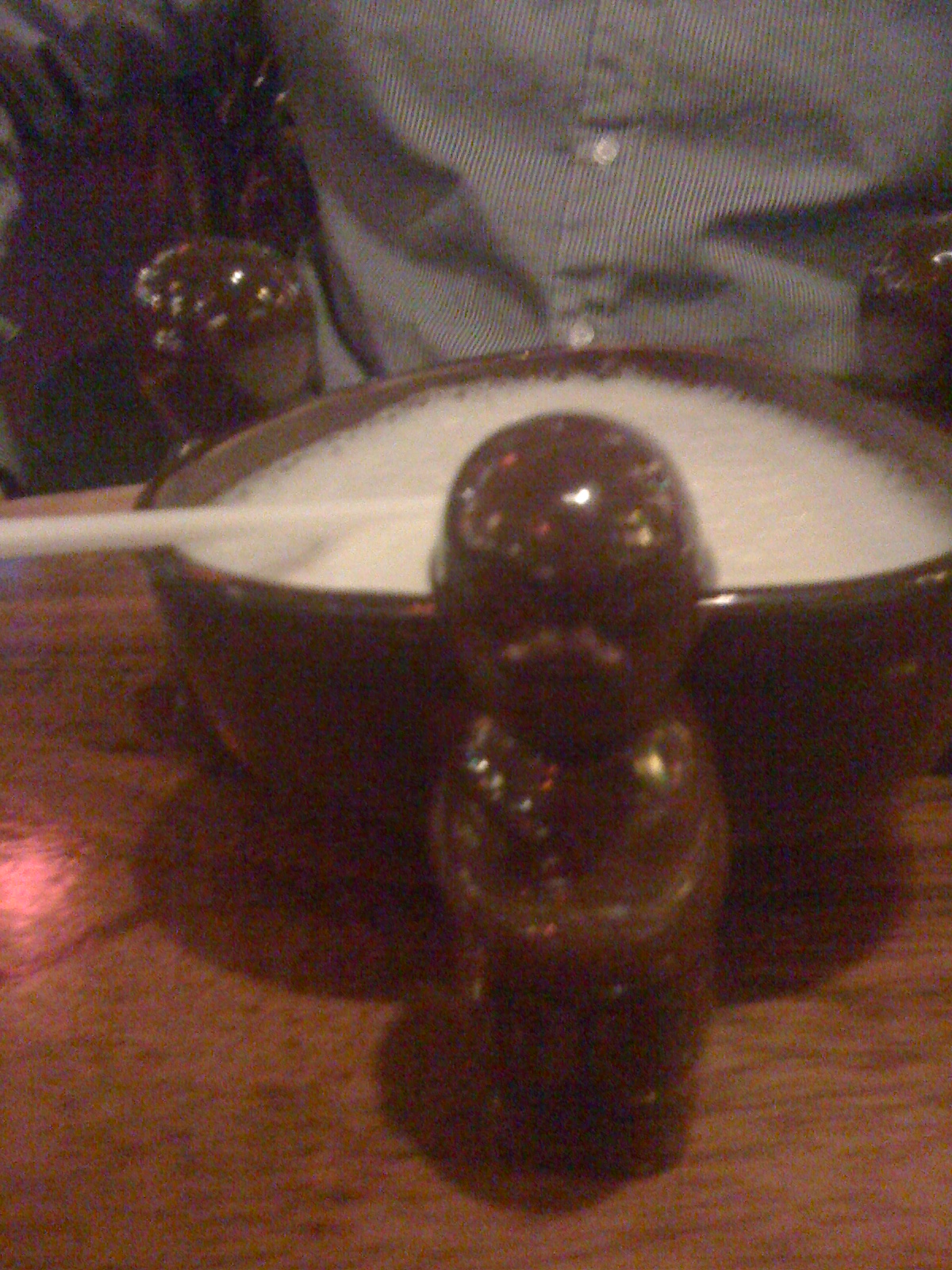
A cocktail at Jardin Tiki
