= Steamin' Billy =

Pub in Leicester, England

- Industry: Brewery
- Founded: 1996
- Headquarters: Leicester, England, UK
- Website: www.steamin-billy.co.uk

Steamin' Billy Group is a pub owning company with its own beer brands.

An alliance was formed when in 1994, William (Bill) Allingham – (Leatherbritches Brewery), aged 19 (the country's youngest brewer at the time), brewed a house beer for Licensee Barry Lount of the Cow & Plough, Oadby Leicester. They called the beer Steamin’ Billy named after Barry's family Jack Russell.

In 1996 Bill Allingham & Barry Lount formed Steamin Billy Brewing Co Ltd to embark upon opening new pubs. Their first venture was the Vaults in Wellington St. Leicester in 1996, followed by the Robert Catesby a 1600-century Inn, in Wells Norfolk.

The beer was originally brewed in the old washhouse and coal store at the back of the Bentley Brook Inn, Fenny Bentley.

A decision was made to contract the beer production out as sales had outgrown the brewery; this initially was undertaken by local brewery, The Grainstore, Oakham.

In 2004, the beer brewing moved for a time to the Victorian Tower Brewery in the old Thomas Salt Maltings in Burton.

The Steamin Billy beers are now brewed under licence at Belvoir Brewery Old Dalby Leicester.

The sole directors and shareholders are William and Cindy Allingham and Barry and Elisabeth Lount.

== Beers ==
Name	%
Steamin’ Billy Bitter	4.3%
Tipsy Fisherman	3.6%
Skydiver	5.0%
Scrum Down Mild	4.2%
1485	5%

== Outlets ==
A reorganisation took place in 2005 bringing the Cow and Plough under the Steamin Billy Company. Further reorganisation followed after more pub acquisitions, bringing the following all under the Steamin Billy Group.

- Cow & Plough, Oadby, Leicester
- Parcel Yard, London Rd, Leicester
- The Paget Arms, Paget St, Loughborough
- Dog & Gun, Chapel St, Syston
- Horse & Trumpet, Main St, Sileby
- The Railway, Station Rd, Hinckley
- The White Bear, Coventry Rd, Hinckley
- The White Horse, Long St, Atherstone
- Three Crowns, Northgate. Oakham
- Wilmot Arms, Morely Rd, Chaddesden, Derby
- Steam Trumpet (renamed Reservoir Inn) Thornton, Leicestershire (The name ‘Steam Trumpet’ came as a result of a collision of a steam train named ‘Samson’ with a horse and cart on the Thornton Crossing, which led to the invention and use of a steam whistle.

The Western has on its premises Leicester's first pub theatre run by "Upstairs at The Western'
