= The Revel Collective =

British bar chain

- Formerly: Revolution Bars Group; Inventive Leisure
- Company type: Public limited company
- Traded as: AIM: TRC
- Industry: Hospitality industry
- Founded: 1991; 35 years ago
- Founder: Roy Ellis; Neil Macleod
- Headquarters: United Kingdom
- Number of locations: 41 (2026)
- Area served: UK
- Key people: Luke Johnson (chairman)
- Brands: Revolution; Revolución de Cuba; Peach Pubs; Founders & Co.
- Revenue: ▼£149 million (2024)
- Number of employees: ▼3,094 (2024)
- Website: www.therevelcollective.com

The Revel Collective, previously known as Revolution Bars Group, is a British operator of bars and pubs founded in 1991 and headquartered in Ashton-under-Lyne, Greater Manchester, England. As of January 2026, the company operates 41 venues under the names Revolution, Revolución de Cuba, Peach Pubs and Founders & Co.

== History ==
The company was founded as Inventive Leisure in 1991 by Roy Ellis and Neil Macleod, who had met in London in the 1980s. They opened their first bar in Ashton-under-Lyne that year, followed shortly by nightclubs and a music venue. In 1996, the founders moved away from the previously unbranded bars and clubs to establish the Revolution chain, featuring vodka as its principal product.

In 2000, the company was floated on the Alternative Investment Market, by which time it operated 21 bars. It was acquired in 2006 by Alchemy Partners, following competing bids from Regent Inns and Ultimate Leisure, in a deal valuing the business at £42.5 million.

The company was ranked 25th in The Sunday Times 100 Best Companies to Work For list in 2013, and at that time employed approximately 1,800 people. Its turnover in the year ending June 2008 was expected to be £71 million with profits of £11 million. Phill Danks became CEO of Revolution Bars Group in 2013.

In August 2017, Revolution Bars Group rejected a merger proposal from nightclub operator Deltic Group, stating that the offer was "not in the best interests of shareholders at this time". In response, Deltic Group said it wanted to appeal directly to shareholders, proposing that existing Revolution shareholders would own 65% of the new company, while Deltic would own the remaining 35 per cent. Revolution Bars Group indicated its preference for a £101.5 million takeover offer by Stonegate, owner of Slug and Lettuce.

In 2022, the company acquired Peach Pubs for £16.5 million, adding 21 leasehold pubs across southern England and the Midlands to its portfolio.

In March 2024, the company announced plans for emergency fundraising and the closure of a quarter of its venues, which threatens hundreds of jobs, as it seeks a sale amid financial challenges.

In September 2024, Luke Johnson was appointed non-executive chairman, replacing Keith Edelman. The following month, the company changed its name to The Revel Collective, stating that the new name better reflected its current structure.

In January 2026, the company entered administration, formally appointing joint administrators on 27 January 2026. Immediately following their appointment, the business and assets of Revolution, Revolucion de Cuba and Founders & Co were sold to Neos Holdco Limited (trading as Neos Hospitality), while Peach pubs were sold to Coral Pub Company Acquisition Limited, founded by Ted Kennedy. The transactions secured the continuation of 20 Revolution, Revolucion de Cuba and Founders & Co venues and 21 Peach pubs, safeguarding 1,582 jobs; however, 14 Revolution sites, six Revolucion de Cuba sites and one Peach site closed with immediate effect, resulting in 591 redundancies.

== Brands ==
=== Revolution ===
Revolution is the original brand of Revolution Bars Group. The unique selling point is the focus on vodka.

=== Revolución de Cuba ===
Revolución de Cuba was created in 2011. The focus is on rum and Cuba.
