= Trap =

Trap most often refers to:

- Trap music, a subgenre of hip hop that originated in the 1990s in the Southeastern United States
- Trap (plumbing), a pipe to prevent the release of gases
- Trapping, using a device (a trap) to capture an animal
- Trap shooting

Trap or TRAP may also refer to:

== Art and entertainment ==
=== Films and television ===
- Trap (2015 film), a Filipino film
- Trap (2024 film), an American film by M. Night Shyamalan
- Traps (1985 film), an Australian film by John Hughes
- Traps (1994 film), an Australian film by Pauline Chan
- Traps (1998 film), a Czech film by Věra Chytilová
- A Trap, a 1997 Polish film
- Trap (TV series), a 2019 South Korean television series
- Traps (TV series), a 1994 American police family drama

=== Music ===
- Trap music, a subgenre of hip hop that originated in the 1990s in the Southeastern United States
- EDM trap music, a subgenre of electronic dance music that originated in the 2010s
- Trap (album), 2000 by Dead Man Ray
- Traps (album), 2012 by Jaill
- Trap (EP), debut by Henry, 2013
- "Trap" (song), by Shakira featuring Maluma, 2018
- Traps, a stage name used by the drummer Buddy Rich
- "Trap", a song by Elizaveta from Messenger
- "Traps", a single from the Bloc Party album Alpha Games, 2021

=== Other uses in art and entertainment ===
- Trap (novel), by Peter Mathers, 1966
- Traps (novel), a 2013 novel by MacKenzie Scott
- A Dangerous Game (novel), a 1956 novel by Friedrich Dürrenmatt, known as Traps in the United States
- Trap room, a part of a theatre
- Treasury Relief Art Project (1935–39), a New Deal art project

== Biology and medicine ==
- Trapezius, a muscle
- Tartrate-resistant acid phosphatase, a metalloenzyme involved in bone formation
- Thyroid hormone receptor-associated protein, part of the mediator coactivator
- TNF-related activation protein, also known as CD40 ligand
- Tripartite ATP-independent periplasmic transporter, in prokaryotes
- trp RNA-binding attenuation protein, in bacilli
- US TRAP laws ("Targeted Regulation of Abortion Providers")
- TNF receptor associated periodic syndrome (TRAPS)
- Twin reversed arterial perfusion, a twin pregnancy abnormality

== Games ==
- Trap (chess)
- Trap (poker), a strategy
- Trap pass, see Glossary of contract bridge terms

== Places ==
- Tarap, Attock, a village in Pakistan
- Trap, Mogila, a village in North Macedonia
- Trap, Carmarthenshire, a hamlet in Wales, United Kingdom
- Trap Grounds, a nature reserve in Oxford, England, United Kingdom

== Science and technology ==
- Chemical trap, a chemical compound that is used to detect unstable compounds
- Ion trap, the use of electric fields to isolate atoms or particles
  - Electron beam ion trap, an electromagnetic bottle that produces and confines highly charged ions
- Ion trapping, an effect of pH differences across a cell membrane
- Magnetic trap, the use of magnetic fields to isolate neutral atoms or particles
- Petroleum trap, a geological structure that forms a petroleum reservoir
- Social trap, a psychological system where people, operating for short-term individual gains, lead to long-term group losses
- Trap rock, any dark-colored, fine-grained, non-granitic igneous rock
- Trap and trace device, records any number called by, or calling, a particular telephone
- Trap (plumbing), a pipe to prevent the release of gases
- Trap (printing), a commercial-printing technique to overcome registration problem

=== Computing ===
- Interrupt, a request for the processor to interrupt executing code
- A type of Simple Network Management Protocol Protocol Data Unit used to report an alert or other asynchronous event about a managed subsystem
- Intercepting normal method calls via a proxy object

== Sports ==
- Neutral zone trap, an ice hockey defensive strategy
- Sand trap, a type of bunker (golf)
- Starting Traps, the equipment that racing greyhounds start a race from
- Trap shooting
- Triathlon Association of the Philippines, the governing body for the sport in the Philippines

== Transportation ==
- Bait car, also known as a trap car
- Trap (car), a secret compartment in an automobile
- Trap (carriage), a type of horse-drawn carriage
- Traffic-related air pollution

== Other uses ==
- Trapping, using a device (a trap) to capture an animal
- Trapdoor
- Operation Trap, code name of a large-scale Soviet offensive operation against the Mujahideen supply base of Karkari-Sharshari
- Tactical Recovery of Aircraft and Personnel, a U.S. military term for a rescue mission to retrieve a downed aircraft
- Training-Repayment-Agreement Provision, a part of an employment bond or contract which stipulates that the cost of on-the-job training will be borne by the employee

== See also ==
- Ambush
- Booby trap
- Sand trap (disambiguation)
- The Trap (disambiguation)
- Trapped (disambiguation)
- Trapper (disambiguation)
