= The Trap =

The Trap may refer to:

== Film ==
- The Trap (1913 film), a lost silent film starring Lon Chaney
- The Trap, a 1914 dramatic short starring Harry von Meter
- The Trap (1918 film), an American drama film starring Alice Brady
- The Trap (1919 film), an American drama film starring Olive Tell
- The Trap (1922 film), an American silent Western starring Lon Chaney
- The Trap (1946 film), a Charlie Chan film starring Sidney Toler
- The Trap (1949 film), an Argentine film directed by Carlos Hugo Christensen
- The Trap (1950 film), a Czech drama directed by Martin Frič
- Jaal (1952 film) or The Trap, an Indian Hindi-language film noir directed by Guru Dutt, starring Dev Anand and Geeta Bali
- The Trap (1959 film), a crime drama directed by Norman Panama
- The Trap (1966 film), an adventure/romance starring Oliver Reed and Rita Tushingham
- The Trap (1985 film), an Italian erotic thriller starring Tony Musante and Laura Antonelli
- Jaal: The Trap, a 2003 Indian Hindi-language film starring Sunny Deol and Tabu
- The Trap (2007 film) or Klopka, a Serbian film
- The Trap, a 2007 short film starring Jeanne Tripplehorn and Camilla Belle
- Faand: The Trap, a 2014 Bangladeshi film starring Shakib Khan
- The Trap, a 2017 short film in competition at the 67th Berlin International Film Festival
- The Trap (2019 film), a film starring Mike Epps and T.I.
- Chakravyuham: The Trap, a 2023 Indian Telugu-language film

== Television ==
=== Series ===
- The Trap (American TV series), a 1950 American television anthology series which was broadcast on CBS
- The Trap (British TV series), a 2007 British documentary television series by Adam Curtis
- The Trap (German TV series), a 2026 German miniseries based on the novel by Melanie Raabe

=== Episodes ===
- "The Trap", 12 O'Clock High season 1, episode 23 (1965)
- "The Trap", 21 Beacon Street episode 10 (1959)
- "The Trap", A Rubovian Legend, series 2, episode 16 (1962)
- "The Trap", Alcoa Presents One Step Beyond season 3, episode 8 (1960)
- "The Trap", Alfred Hitchcock Presents season 10, episode 18 (1965)
- "The Trap", Armored Trooper Votoms episode 5 (1983)
- "The Trap", Bonanza season 6, episode 26 (1965)
- "The Trap", Captain Petko Voivode part 1, episode 2 (1981)
- "The Trap" (Captain Scarlet and the Mysterons), episode 13 (1967)
- "The Trap", Casualty series 23, episode 34 (2009)
- "The Trap", Cheyenne season 2, episode 8 (1956)
- "The Trap", Code 3 episode 17 (1957)
- "The Trap" (Code Lyoko) season 1, episode 14 (2003)
- "The Trap", Code Lyoko: Evolution episode 19 (2020)
- "The Trap", Corky and White Shadow episode 7 (1956)
- "The Trap", Craig Kennedy, Criminologist episode 25 (1953)
- "The Trap", Damaged season 1, episode 12 (2018)
- "The Trap", Danger Man series 1, episode 31 (1961)
- "The Trap", Daniel Boone season 2, episode 26 (1966)
- "The Trap", Diver Dan episode 18 (1960)
- "The Trap", Douglas Fairbanks Presents season 2, episode 6 (1954)
- "The Trap" (Fallout) season 1, episode 6 (2024)
- "The Trap", Flipper & Lopaka season 1, episode 24 (1999)
- "The Trap", Free Meek episode 2 (2019)
- "The Trap", Fright Krewe season 1, episode 9 (2023)
- "The Trap", Have Gun – Will Travel season 5, episode 25 (1962)
- "The Trap", Highway Patrol season 4, episode 14 (1959)
- "The Trap", Hopalong Cassidy season 1, episode 15 (1952)
- "The Trap", Kaatelal & Sons episode 146 (2021)
- "The Trap", Kana Kaanum Kaalangal season 1, episode 21 (2022)
- "The Trap", Land of the Giants episode 8 (1968)
- "The Trap", Les Misérables episode 8 (1967)
- "The Trap", M Squad season 2, episode 5 (1958)
- "The Trap", Maigret (1960 TV series) series 3, episode 12 (1962)
- "The Trap", Man from Interpol episode 11 (1960)
- "The Trap", Planet of the Apes episode 3 (1974)
- "The Trap", Play of the Week season 5, episode 28 (1960)
- "The Trap", P.O.W. – Bandi Yuddh Ke episode 28 (2016)
- "The Trap", Puncch Beat season 2, episode 13 (2021)
- "The Trap", P-Valley season 1, episode 4 (2020)
- "The Trap", Rescue 8 episode 38 (1959)
- "The Trap", Robotech season 2, episode 8 (1985)
- "The Trap", Shabash Feluda episode 9 (2023)
- "The Trap", Shaolin Wuzang episode 26 (2015)
- "The Trap", Six Feet Under season 3, episode 5 (2003)
- "The Trap", Starsky & Hutch season 3, episode 16 (1978)
- "The Trap", Supernatural season 15, episode 9 (2020)
- "The Trap", Tales from the Crypt season 3, episode 3 (1991)
- "The Trap", The Adventures of Kit Carson season 1 episode 22 (1952)
- "The Trap", The Adventures of Robin Hood series 2, episode 13 (1956)
- "The Trap", The Adventures of William Tell episode 19 (1959)
- "The Trap", The Bill series 4, episode 18 (1988)
- "The Trap", The Cowboys episode 10 (1974)
- "The Trap", The Detectives season 1, episode 17 (1960)
- "The Trap", The Escape of R.D.7 episode 4 (1961)
- "The Trap" (The Flash) season 1, episode 20 (2015)
- "The Trap", The Guns of Will Sonnett season 2, episode 2 (1968)
- "The Trap", The Larkins (2021 TV series), series 2, episode 2 (2022)
- "The Trap", The Legend of Prince Valiant season 1, episode 15 (1991)
- "The Trap", The Legend of White Fang episode 26 (1994)
- "The Trap", The New Adventures of Zorro episode 8 (1981)
- "The Trap", The Untouchables of Elliot Mouse episode 14 (1996)
- "The Trap", Vella Raja episode 5 (2018)

== Music ==
- "The Trap" (song), a 1993 song by X Marks the Pedwalk
- "The Trap", a song by Tally Hall on their 2011 album Good & Evil
- "The Trap", song by Ron Goodwin from the 1966 film The Trap

== Literature ==
- "The Trap", a 1932 short story co-written by H. P. Lovecraft
- The Trap, a 1950 novel by Dan Billany
- The Trap, a 1955 novel by Dan Jacobson
- The Trap, a 1956 novel by Harry Stephen Keeler, the third installment of the Tuddleton Trotter series
- The Trap, a 1973 novel by Helen Cresswell
- The Trap, a 1985 novel by Kenneth Royce
- The Trap, a 1985 novel by John Treherne
- The Trap, a. k. a. Wolves at the Door, a 1986 novel by Tabitha King
- The Trap, a 1998 novel by Nancy Rue
- "The Trap", a 2000 short story by Christine Harris
- The Trap, a 2002 novel by Joan Lowery Nixon
- The Trap, a 2006 novel by John Smelcer
- The Trap, a 2013 novel by Kimberley Chambers
- The Trap, a 2013 novel by Andrew Fukuda, the third installment of The Hunt Trilogy
- The Trap: Terrorism, Heroism and Everything in Between, a 2016 book by Alan Gibbons
- The Trap (German: Die Falle), a 2016 novel by Melanie Raabe

== Places ==
- Old Trap, North Carolina, U.S., or The Trap, an unincorporated community
- Neutral zone trap or simply "the trap", a defensive strategy in ice hockey
- The Trap (bar), a historic bar in Sacramento, California

== See also ==
- Trap (disambiguation)
- Trapped (disambiguation)
- Trapper (disambiguation)
