= Bestattung Wien =

Austrian company

The Bestattung Wien (English: "Undertaking Service of Vienna" ) is Austria's leading funeral director, and one of the largest in Europe.

== History and description ==
Bestattung Wien was founded in 1907, under the name of "Gemeinde Wien - Städtische Leichenbestattung". Since 1999 it has been a subsidiary of Wiener Stadtwerke Holding AG, and has had the legal form of a GmbH (public limited company). The company has organised some two million burials since its foundation - from intimate services for immediate family through to grand state funerals - as well as repatriations from all over the world. Bestattung Wien provides undertaking services almost 18,500 times a year. These include some 8,500 burials and 2,500 cremations, as well as other activities such as exhumations, repatriations and third-party services. According to several media reports Bestattung Wien has a quasi monopoly for funeral services in Vienna.

Bestattung Wien has almost 400 staff, of whom 60 are employed at the Atzgersdorf coffin factory (Breitenfurter Strasse 176, 23rd district). The factory, established in 1919, is a wholly owned subsidiary of Bestattung Wien. It makes 25,000 coffins a year, meeting the entire needs of Vienna and a quarter of those of the rest of Austria. In 1994 the firm was honoured by award of the Austrian state coat of arms for outstanding services to industry.

Bestattung Wien's headquarters are home to the Vienna Funeral Museum. This gives an insight into funeral customs and burial rites, focusing on Vienna.

== See also ==
- Funeral Museum Vienna

== External links and source ==
- Bestattung Wien Official Site
