= Trappist (disambiguation) =

A Trappist is a monk or nun of the Order of Cistercians of the Strict Observance.

Trappist may also refer to:

- TRAPPIST, Transiting Planets and Planetesimals Small Telescope
  - TRAPPIST-1, star system found using TRAPPIST
- Products made at Trappist monasteries:
  - Trappist beer
  - Trappista cheese
  - Trappist Dairy
- Trappist Sign Language, monastic sign language used by Trappists

== Distinguish ==
- Trapper (disambiguation)
