= In the Trap (disambiguation) =

In the Trap is a 2019 Italian horror film.

In the Trap may also refer to:

- "In the Trap" (Line of Duty series 1)
- "In the Trap" (Line of Duty series 4)

== See also ==
- The Trap (disambiguation)
