= Stormy Kromer Pursuit =

The Stormy Kromer Pursuit is a two-day cross-country skiing event that is held each January in Iron County, Wisconsin, in the United States. On the first day of the competition, there is a 10K classic race on the Montreal trail system in the northern portion of the county. The second day consists of a 15K free-style race on the MECCA Trail System in southern Iron County, near Mercer.

Since the Stormy Kromer's inception in 2004, the race has attracted many of the Midwest's most talented cross country skiing competitors, many of which use the race as practice for more well known races such as the American Birkebeiner. The major sponsor of the race is the Stormy Kromer Mercantile located in Ironwood, Michigan, who provide all race participants with a traditional Stormy Kromer cap.
