= Pocket-Greenhaven, Sacramento, California =

Neighborhood in Sacramento, California, United States

Pocket-Greenhaven
- Neighborhood of Sacramento
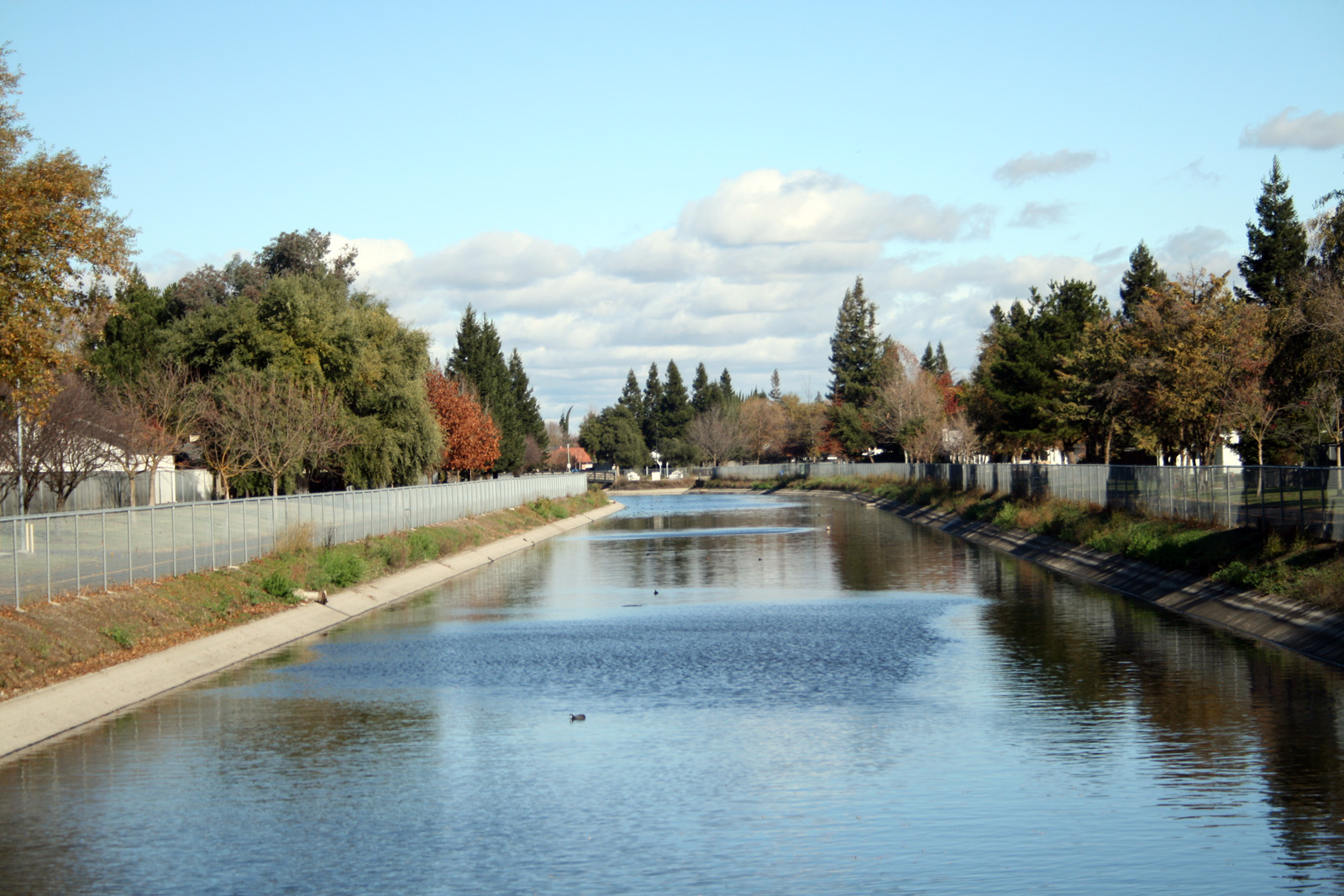
- Part of the large canal system in the Pocket

- Location within Sacramento Pocket-Greenhaven (the United States)
- Coordinates: 38°29′50″N 121°32′10″W
- Country: United States
- State: California
- County: Sacramento
- City: Sacramento
- Time zone: UTC−8 (Pacific)
  - Summer (DST): UTC−7 (PDT)
- ZIP Code: 95831

Pocket-Greenhaven (also known as The Pocket) is a neighborhood within the city of Sacramento, California, 5 miles south of downtown Sacramento. It is bordered by Interstate 5 on the east and a semi-circular "pocket" bend in the Sacramento River on the south, west, and north. The three exits into the Pocket-Greenhaven community off Interstate 5 are 43rd Avenue (southbound only), Florin Road, and Pocket/Meadowview Road.

Entering the area from the south on Interstate 5, travelers pass a landmark water tower with the words "Welcome to SACRAMENTO AMERICA'S FARM-TO-FORK CAPITAL" painted on it, marking the southern boundary of the city of Sacramento. The previous words were “SACRAMENTO City of Trees.” The water tower was originally blank and stood alongside wheat and barley fields. Pocket-Greenhaven is located in the 95831 ZIP code.

The Pocket-Greenhaven neighborhood is a low-crime neighborhood, overall. There are two private lakes and 18 public parks in the neighborhood.

== Schools ==
The main high school serving the neighborhood is John F. Kennedy High School, established in 1967. The School of Engineering and Sciences, a public secondary school, opened in 2010.

Middle schools in the area include Sam Brannan Middle School, Martin Luther King Jr. School, and the private Camellia Waldorf School.

Elementary schools include Matsuyama Elementary School, Caroline Wenzel Elementary School, Genevieve Didion Elementary School, Pony Express Elementary School, and John Cabrillo Elementary School. Private elementary and early education options include Montessori Country Day, Camellia Waldorf School, Brookfield School, and Merryhill School.

Bear Flag Elementary School (K-6), the original elementary school serving the area since 1964, closed in 2008.

== Development and history ==
=== Early history and agriculture ===
Before settlement, the Pocket-Greenhaven area was a riparian forest with deciduous trees growing beside the river and streams. The center of the bend sits slightly below sea level, with drainage originally flowing toward a swampy, tule-filled middle. The bend covers 6.8 square miles, features highly fertile alluvium soil, and contains a former clay pit now known as Lake Greenhaven (originally referred to as Lake Greenhaven Shores).

Prior to European settlement, the Nisenan (also known as the Southern Maidu) inhabited the river bend. They utilized the area primarily during the summer months to hunt and fish along the Sacramento River. Archaeological features in the region, including indigenous earthen mounds, indicate that the Nisenan used the elevated areas within the bend for settlements and burials to avoid seasonal flooding.

Following the Gold Rush, immigrants and former miners began to populate the area. Early white settlers largely avoided buying land in the bend because it was considered un-farmable swampland. However, several Portuguese families, primarily immigrants from the Azores, alongside Chinese laborers, became the first major groups to settle the area.

Navigation along the Sacramento River near the Pocket was historically hindered by the Haycock Shoals, a large sandbar that formed in the river currents around Garcia Bend. This obstruction made the river nearly impassable for steamers and other craft except during periods of high water. To resolve these navigation problems, the federal government issued a $10,000 contract in 1894 to the San Francisco firm Healy & Tibbetts to remove the shoals and improve the navigability of the river.

The Portuguese settlers drained the farmland and engaged in dairying and agriculture. They initially operated as subsistence farmers, but later sold crops to downtown Sacramento stores and to miners during the Comstock Lode. The fertile soil yielded lettuce, cabbage, grain, onions, potatoes, tomatoes, sugar beets, spinach, and asparagus, as well as pear, walnut, and orange orchards. Local economic hubs established by these families included a gasoline station, Grangers Dairy, Da Rosa Grocery, a slaughterhouse, and Pimentel's Ingleside Cafe (now known as The Trap).

The Portuguese community also built and maintained levees along the Sacramento River, created the Upper and Lower Lisbon Schools to educate their children, established St. Mary's Church as a local cultural anchor, and held annual Holy Ghost festas. A major flood caused by the Edwards levee break occurred in 1904. During this era, ferries were utilized to transport residents to the town of Freeport and across the river to West Sacramento.

The Pocket-Greenhaven area also housed the Sacramento Brickyard Co., established in 1854 and considered one of the first brickyards in Northern California. In its earlier days, Chinese migrant laborers extracted clay from the local pit and hauled it by mule. Positioned next to the river, bricks were easily transported to downtown Sacramento and San Francisco, and were used in the foundations of the State Capitol and Memorial Auditorium.

After World War I, a sizable Japanese population settled in the bend, establishing a presence alongside the Portuguese community. During World War II, when Japanese American families were forced into internment camps, many Portuguese neighbors in the Pocket protected and maintained their homes and farms. This community support allowed many Japanese residents to retain their property and return to it after the war, a rare outcome compared to other areas where interned individuals permanently lost their land. The area remained a sparsely inhabited farming community until mid-century.

=== Suburban development (1950s–1970s) ===
In 1958, developers The Lincoln and Parker Development Co. purchased the King and Zacharias ranches, acquiring over 700 acres for a planned community initially called "Greenhaven '70." Before approving any subdivisions, the city required a comprehensive master plan for the Pocket's entire 4,674 acres. This Pocket Area General Development Plan included schools, shopping centers, churches, a hospital, a library, and a theater.

Following the annexation of the area in 1959, Greenhaven was incorporated into the City of Sacramento. The city's Planning Commission passed the general development plan in July 1961, and the city council adopted it fully that September. The subsequent rezoning from agricultural to urban use increased property taxes, prompting many of the remaining farmers to sell their land.

Groundbreaking for the "Greenhaven '70" community began in 1961, and the project was acclaimed as the "Best Planned Community of the Year" by the National Association of Home Builders in 1962. The development was centered around a greenbelt (Frank Seymour Park) between Greenhaven and Havenside Drives. Residents were required to join the Greenhaven Homeowners Association, which enforced strict community standards regarding utility lines, property maintenance, and aesthetics. By the mid-1960s, a large number of homes and local infrastructure had been completed, including Bear Flag Elementary School (1964) and John F. Kennedy High School (1967).

The Sacramento Brickyard closed in January 1971 due to encroaching suburban development. The former clay pit and its surrounding parcels were converted into custom-built lakefront properties around Greenhaven Lake. Original plans for a Greenhaven Marina and a public greenbelt around Lake Greenhaven were ultimately rejected by the Army Corps of Engineers and the city, respectively. This resulted in the lake being zoned for large, private lakefront lots.

In the mid-1970s, the section of I-5 that gave Greenhaven direct freeway access was completed, featuring exits at Seamas and 43rd Avenues. All 1,600 proposed homes from the original Greenhaven master plan were eventually built, and the area became known simply as Greenhaven.

=== Expansion into "The Pocket" (1980s–1990s) ===
A major building boom occurred in the 1980s and early 1990s, expanding development further south and west into the "Pocket." This era saw the construction of custom-built homes, gated communities, condominiums, apartment complexes, and the addition of a second private lake. It was during this time that the broader area became colloquially referred to as "the Pocket Area."

To accommodate the growth, Florin Road and Greenhaven Drive were extended through the area, and I-5 added access points at Florin Road and Pocket Road. By 1986, the last remaining Portuguese farming families had sold their land to developers. The historic Dutra House, located at Pocket Road and Greenhaven Drive, was preserved and repurposed as a commercial office. Today, the Pocket-Greenhaven area is a dense suburban community that completely fills the semi-circular bend of the Sacramento River.

== Demographics ==
Based on U.S. Census Bureau data for the Pocket-Greenhaven area (ZIP code 95831), the neighborhood has a population of approximately 41,500 residents. Refined by the historical influx of diverse immigrant farming groups and subsequent suburban development, the modern neighborhood's racial and ethnic makeup is approximately 35% White, 31% Asian, 18% Hispanic or Latino, 9% Black or African American, and 7% representing two or more races or other groups.
