= Funeral Museum Vienna =

Museum in Vienna

Coordinates: 48.189707°N 16.377021°E

Bestattungsmuseum Wien
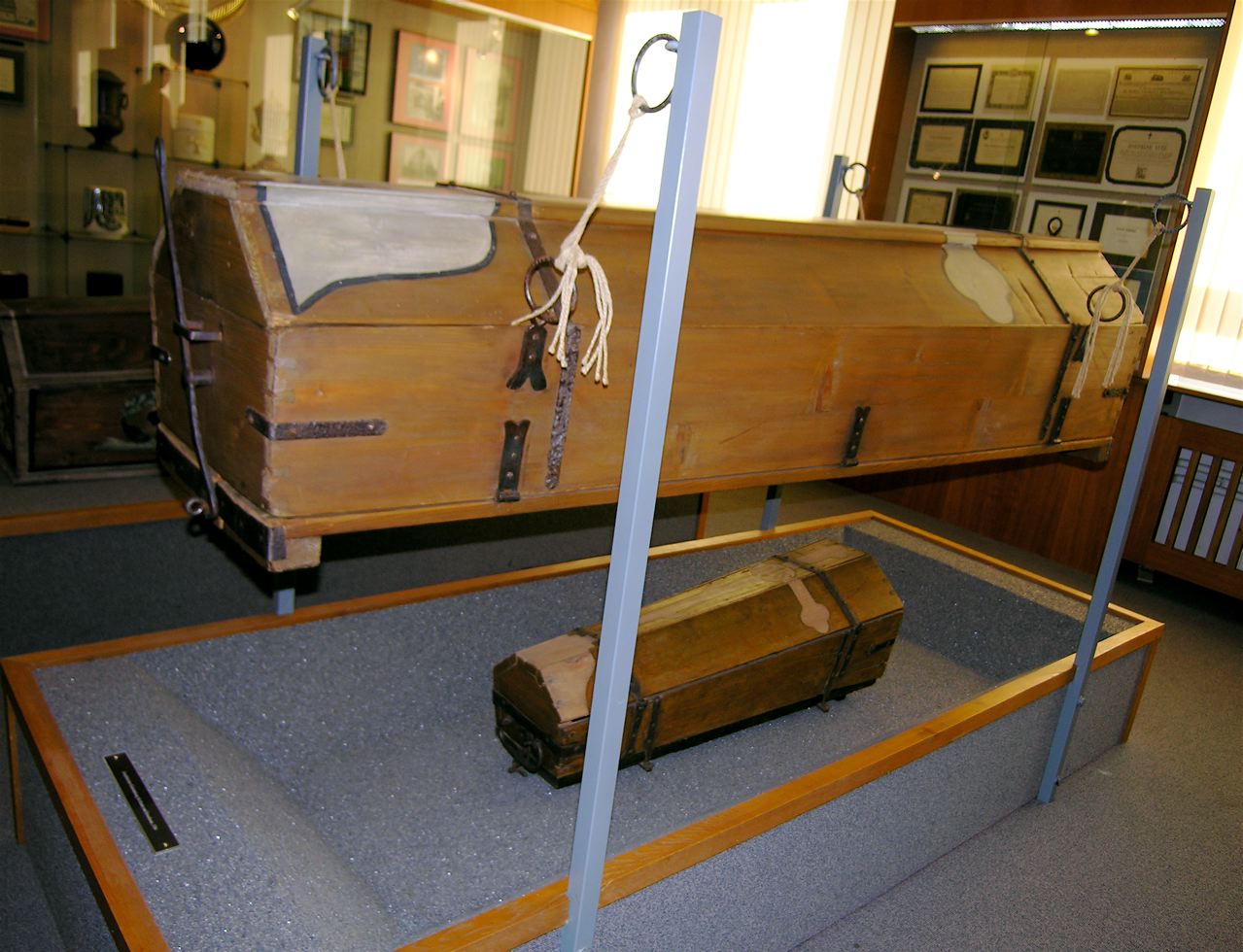
- The re-usable coffin instigated in 1784 by Emperor Josef II
- Established: 1967
- Location: Vienna, Austria
- Website: www.bestattungsmuseum.at

The Bestattungsmuseum Wien (English: "Funeral Museum Vienna") is a museum in Vienna, Austria. With around 1,000 exhibits, the Vienna Funeral Museum gives a comprehensive overview of funeral customs, burial rites, funerary art and the special Viennese perspective on death and provides information on the historical and current funeral services in Vienna.

== History and description ==
When the Austro-Hungarian Empire was at its peak, people paid heavily to make sure they would be remembered. Their obsession of a "schöne Leiche" (a beautiful corpse) prompted them to save money to ensure their send off was as grand as possible. In Vienna in the 1900s more than eighty private funeral companies competed for the business of burying the city's citizens in one of the 52 cemeteries in the suburban area.

In 1951 the Bestattung Wien, or Undertaking Service of Vienna, was appointed as the only funeral company in the city. The museum was founded in 1967 and designed in 1987 by Wittigo Keller.

Located in the 4th district at Goldeggasse 19, near the Belvedere, Vienna, it also houses the intriguing Vienna Undertakers' Museum, which contains more than 600 artifacts documenting the Viennese interest in death and burial.

There are elaborate black uniforms and regalia worn by the pallbearers, from the French pompes funèbres, as well as hearses, wreaths, sashes, lanterns, torches, black flags, even an urn in the shape of a football and a "sitting coffin".

A real curiosity on display in the Bestattungsmuseum is the re-usable coffin instigated in 1784 by Emperor Joseph II, in an attempt to save wood and to hasten decomposition. The coffins were equipped with a trap underneath to drop the bodies in the graves and kept for another funeral. But the Viennese protests led to the cancellation of the law within six months. With court decree of 29 May 1825, it was decreed that every deceased had to be placed in a sealed coffin before being lowered into the ground.

Another curiosity is a device whereby a cord; attached to the hand of the deceased would ring a bell above ground to prevent premature burial, just in case the person wasn't really dead. To avoid this, some Viennese stipulated in their will that after death they should be stabbed in the heart with a sword. To this day, the city's hospital is still occasionally instructed to administer a lethal injection after death to avoid premature burial.

== The new location ==
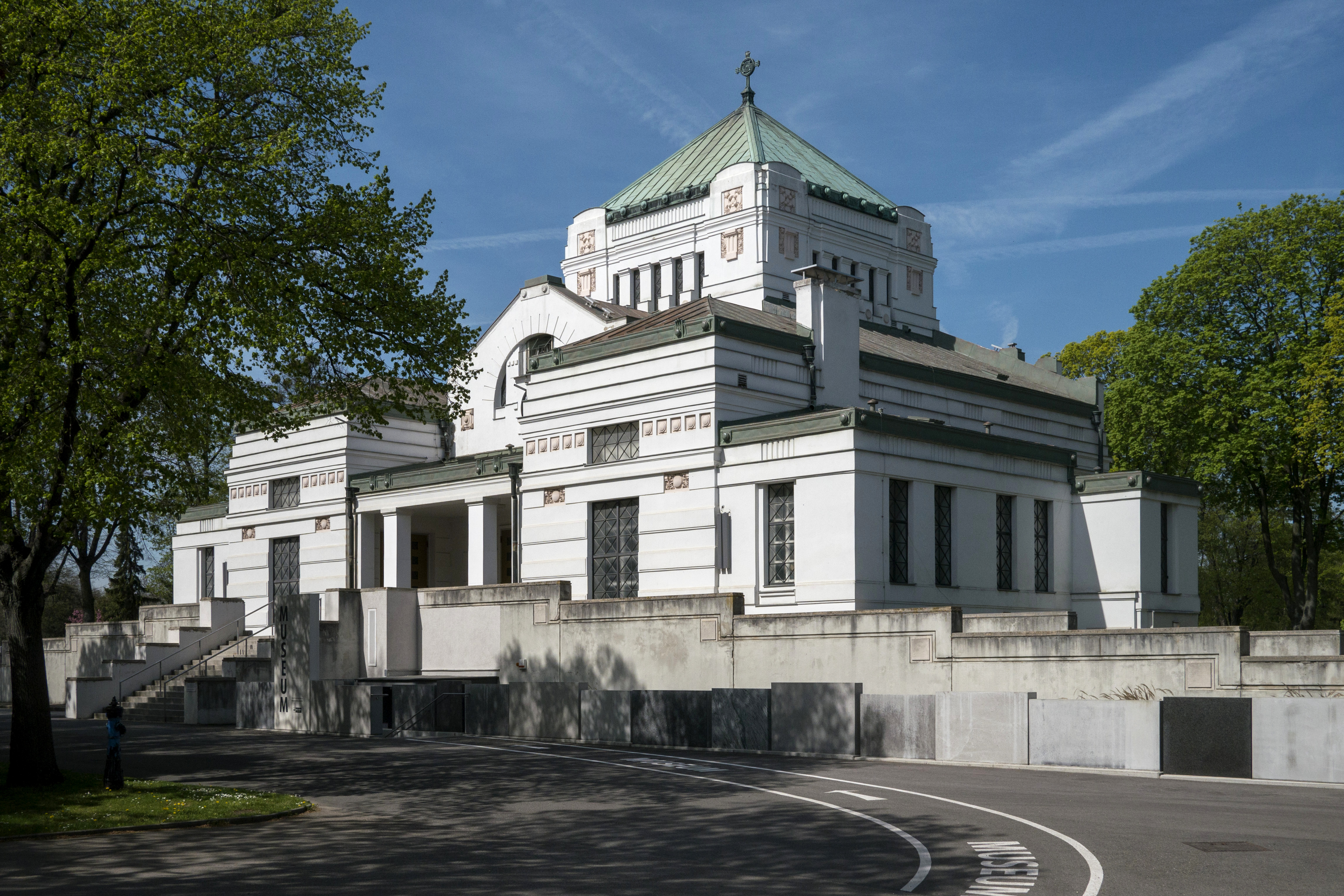
The museum is located in mortuary 2

The funeral Vienna GmbH has announced its plans to establish a new administration building soon, opposite the Zentralfriedhof on the main street near the cemetery gate 2, in the 11th city district of Simmering and its address is Bestattung Wien 11., Simmeringer Hauptstraße 339, Vienna 1110, Austria.

== External links and reference ==
- Funeral Museum Vienna
- Schene Leichen: Ein Gang durchs Bestattungsmuseum - Fotostrecke, derstandard.at, January 2008
- Raumplan, Bestattungsgeschichte, Museumsstücke
