= Coffin =

Funerary box for corpses

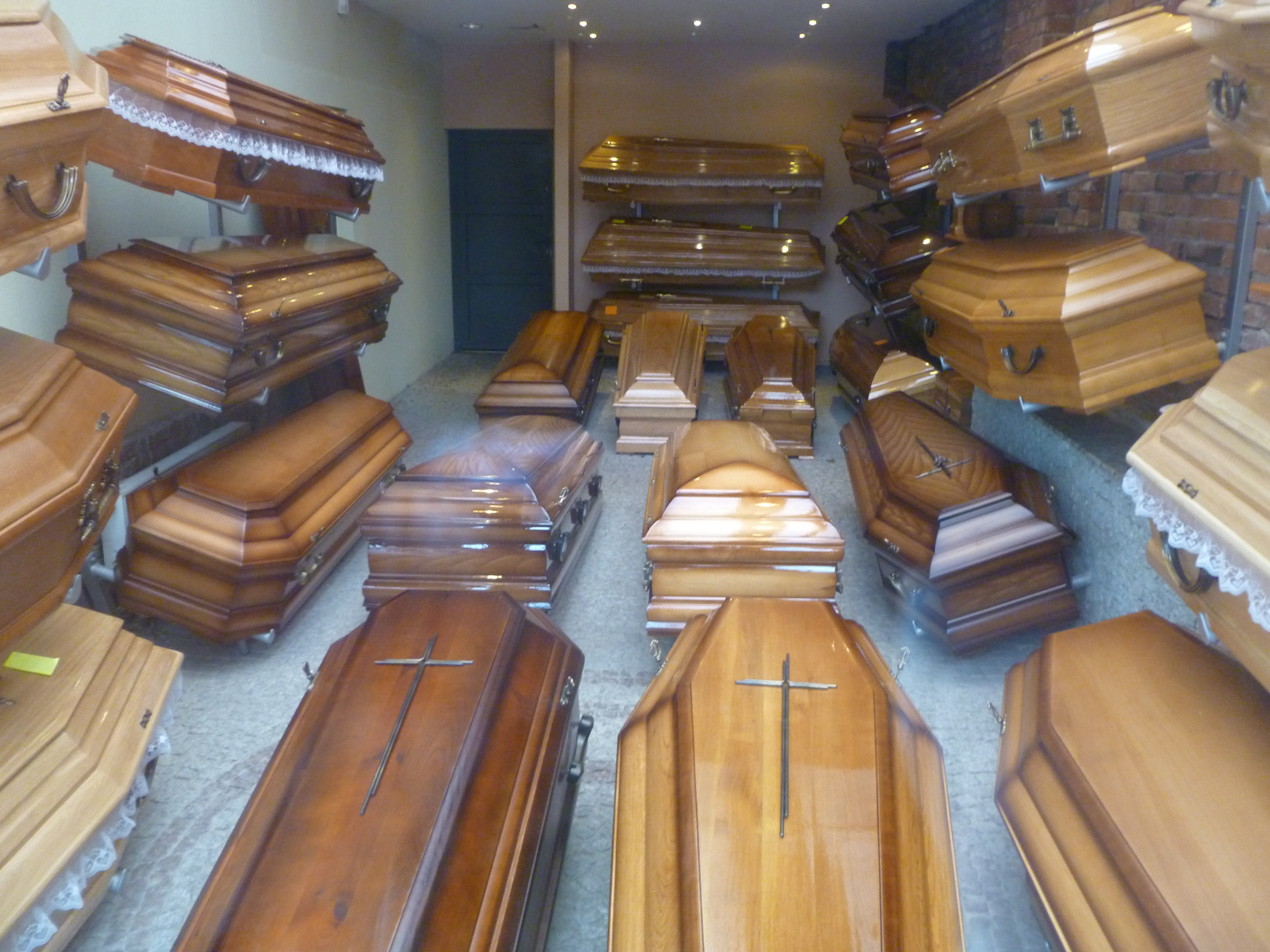
A display of coffins in the office of a funeral director in Poland

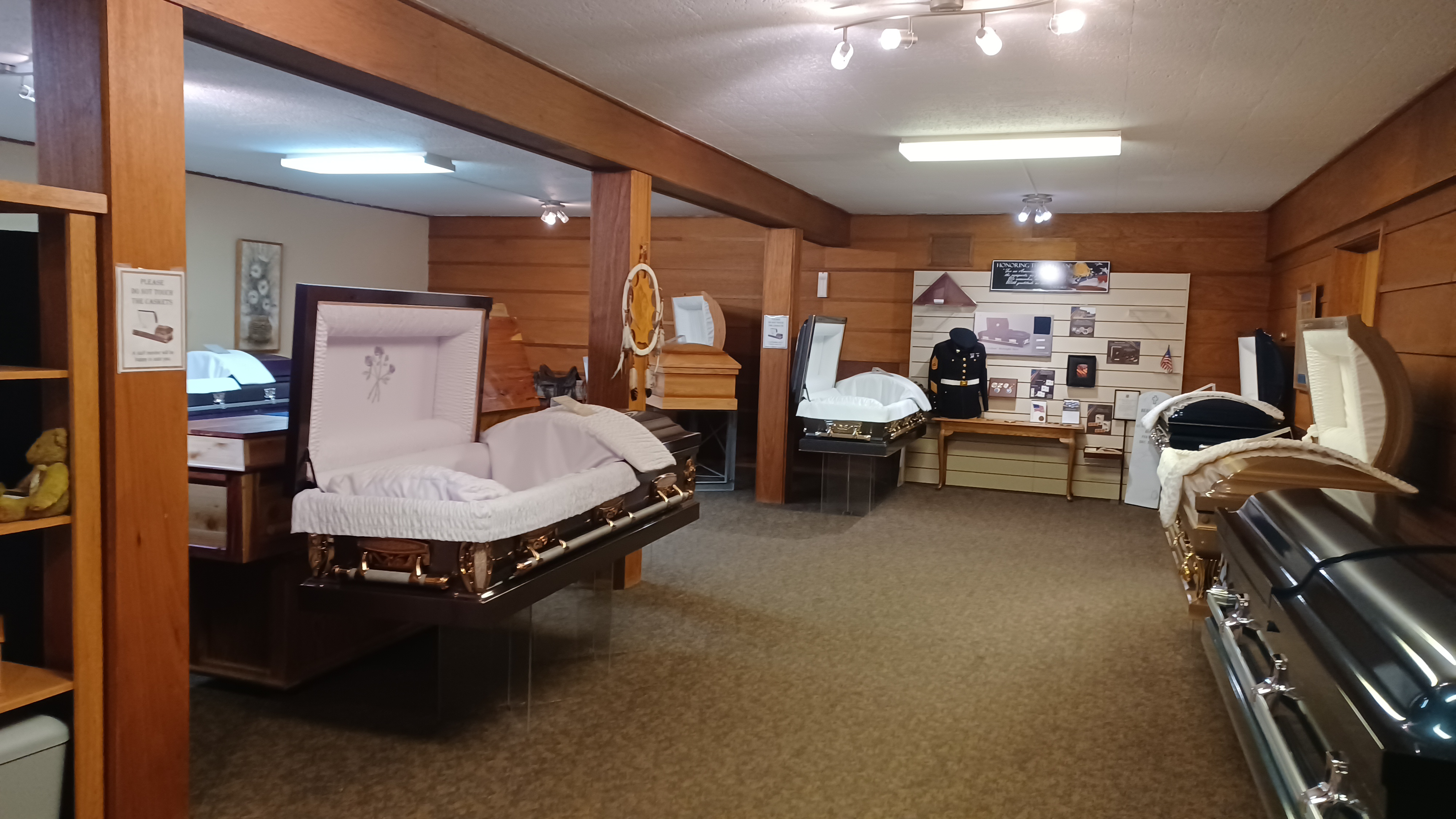
A casket showroom in Billings, Montana, depicting split lid coffins

A coffin or casket is a funerary box used for viewing or keeping a corpse, for burial, entombment or cremation. Coffins are sometimes referred to as caskets, particularly in American English.

A distinction is commonly drawn between "coffins" and "caskets", using "coffin" to refer to a tapered hexagonal or octagonal (also considered to be anthropoidal in shape) box and "casket" to refer to a rectangular box, often with a split lid used for viewing the deceased as seen in the picture. Receptacles for cremated and cremulated human ashes (sometimes called cremains) are called urns.

== Etymology ==
Coffin, first attested in English in 1380, derives from the Old French cofin, from Latin cophinus, the latinisation of Greek κόφινος (kophinos), all meaning basket. The earliest attested form of the word is the Mycenaean Greek ko-pi-na, written in Linear B syllabic script. The modern French form, couffin, means cradle. (Note: See also berceau, couffin and cophinus at Wiktionary)

Casket originally referred to a jewelry box; use of the word in the funerary sense began as a euphemism introduced by the undertaker's trade.

== History ==
The earliest evidence of wooden coffin remains, dated at 5000 BC, was found at the Beishouling, Shaanxi historical site, in Tomb 4. Clear evidence of a rectangular wooden coffin was found in Tomb 152 in an early Banpo site. The Banpo coffin belongs to a four-year-old girl; it measures 1.4 m (4.6 ft) by 0.55 m (1.8 ft) and 3–9 cm thick. As many as 10 wooden coffins have been found at the Dawenkou culture (4100–2600 BC) site at Chengzi, Shandong. The thickness of the coffin, as determined by the number of timber frames in its composition, also emphasized the level of nobility, as mentioned in the Classic of Rites, Xunzi and Zhuangzi.

Examples of coffin use have been found in several Neolithic sites: the double coffin, the earliest of which was found in the Liangzhu culture (3400–2250 BC) site at Puanqiao, Zhejiang, consists of an outer and an inner coffin, while the triple coffin, with its earliest finds from the Longshan culture (3000–2000 BC) sites at Xizhufeng and Yinjiacheng in Shandong, consists of two outer coffins and one inner.

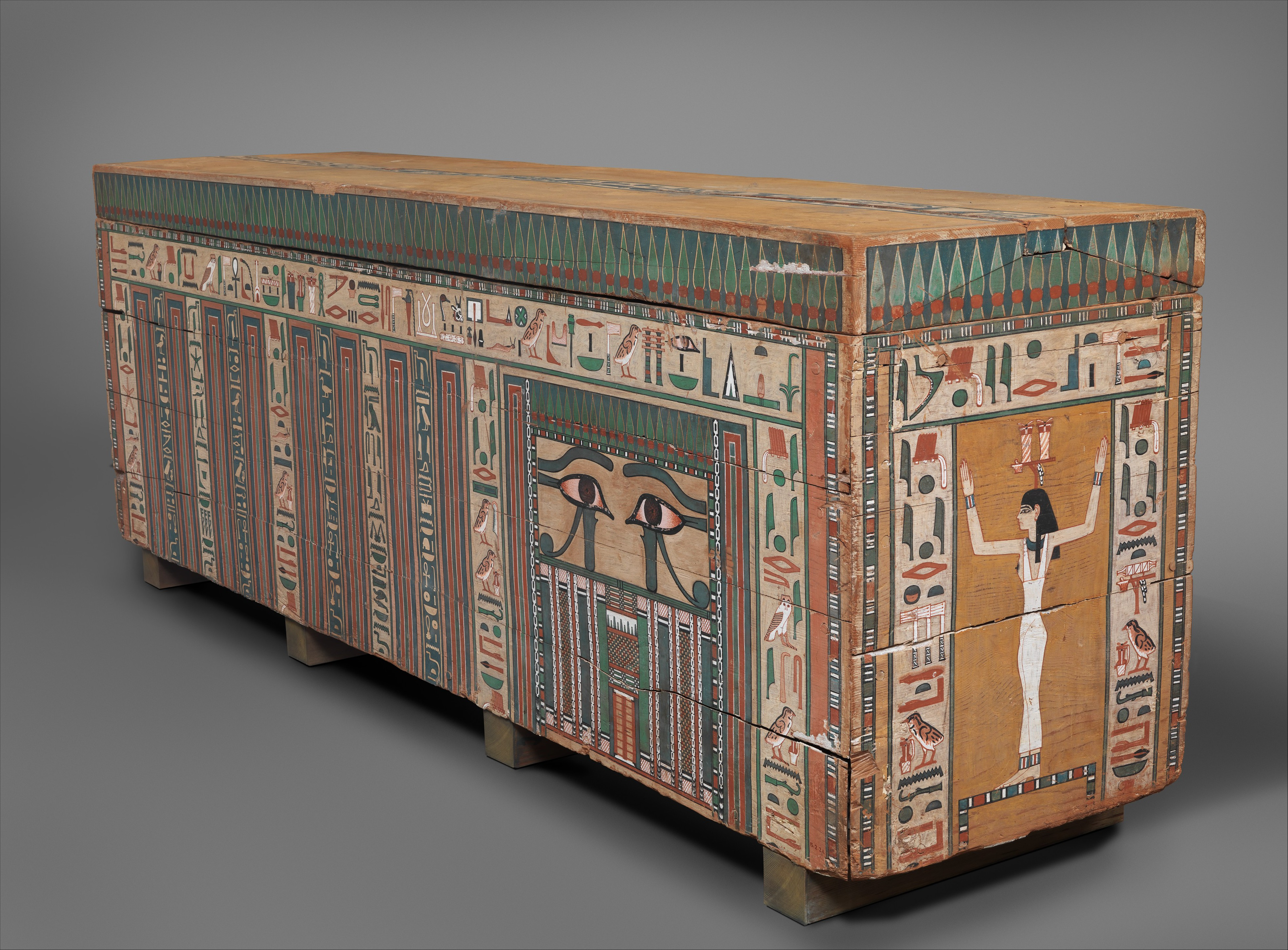
Ancient Egyptian coffin, 1802–1640 BC

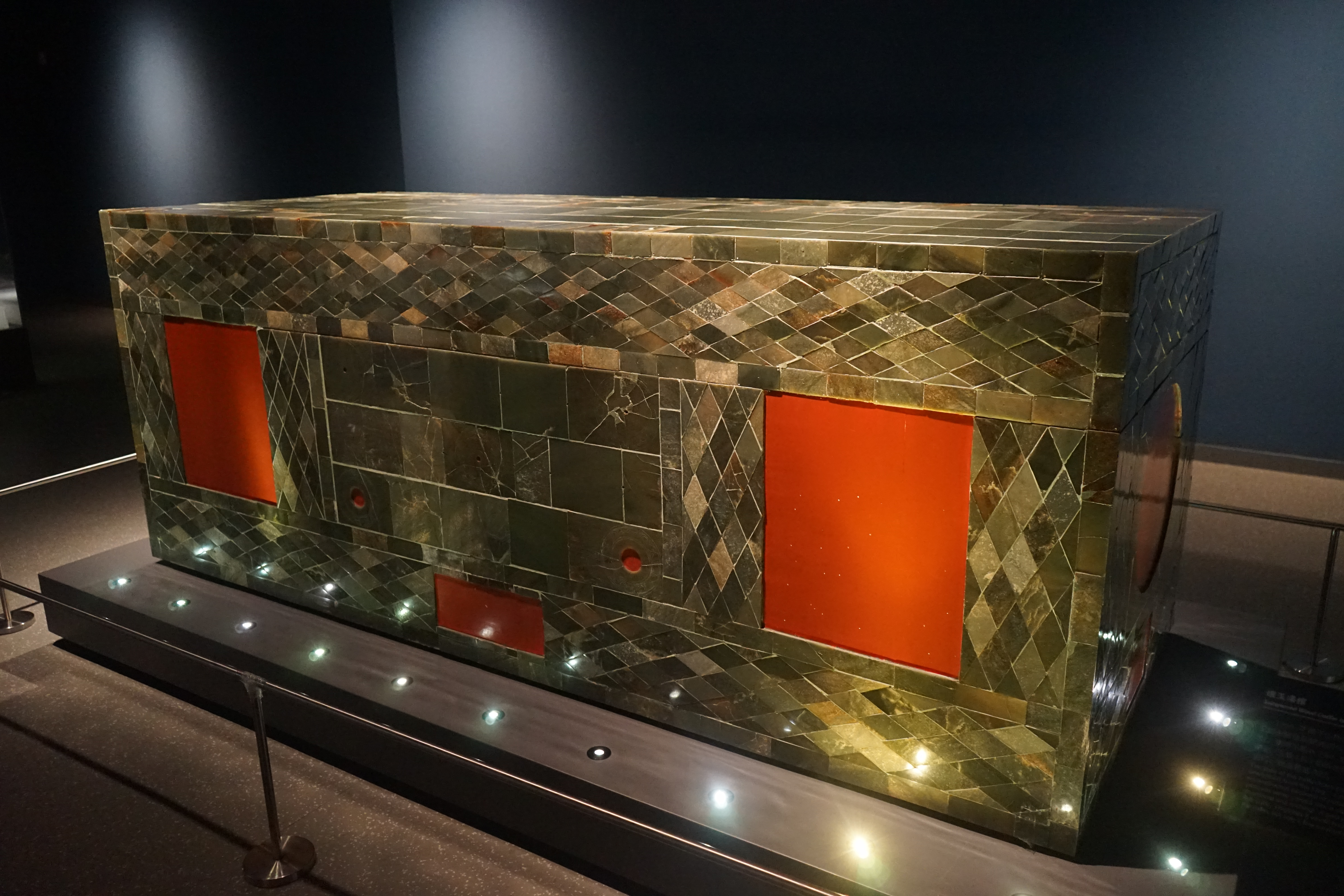
Coffin of prince Liu Wu, covered with jade panels. China, 154 BC

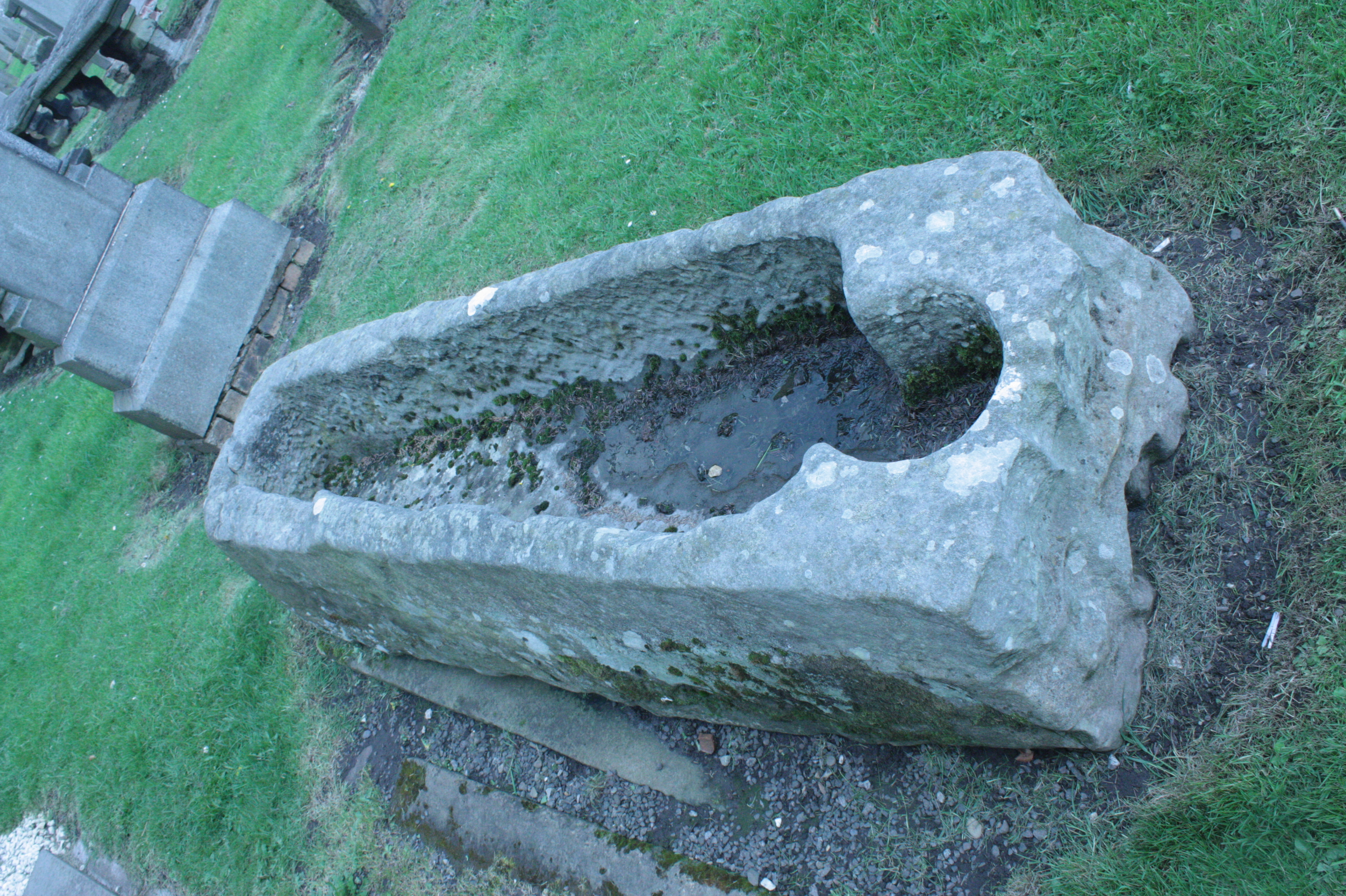
Plain bespoke stone coffin, circa 7th century

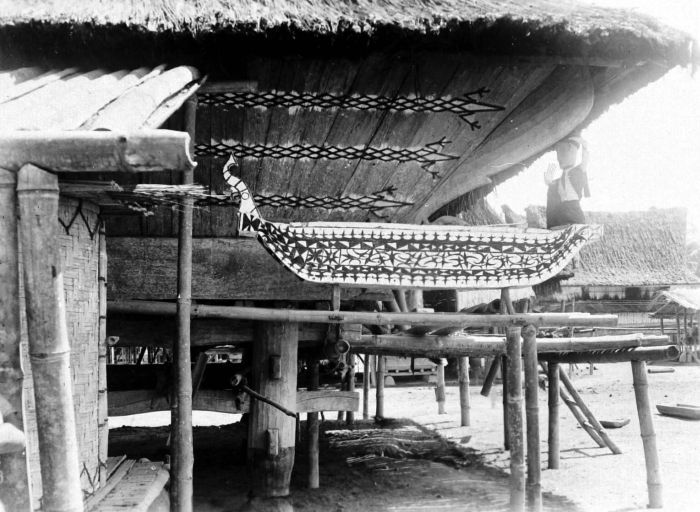
A Karo coffin in Northern Sumatra

== Practices ==
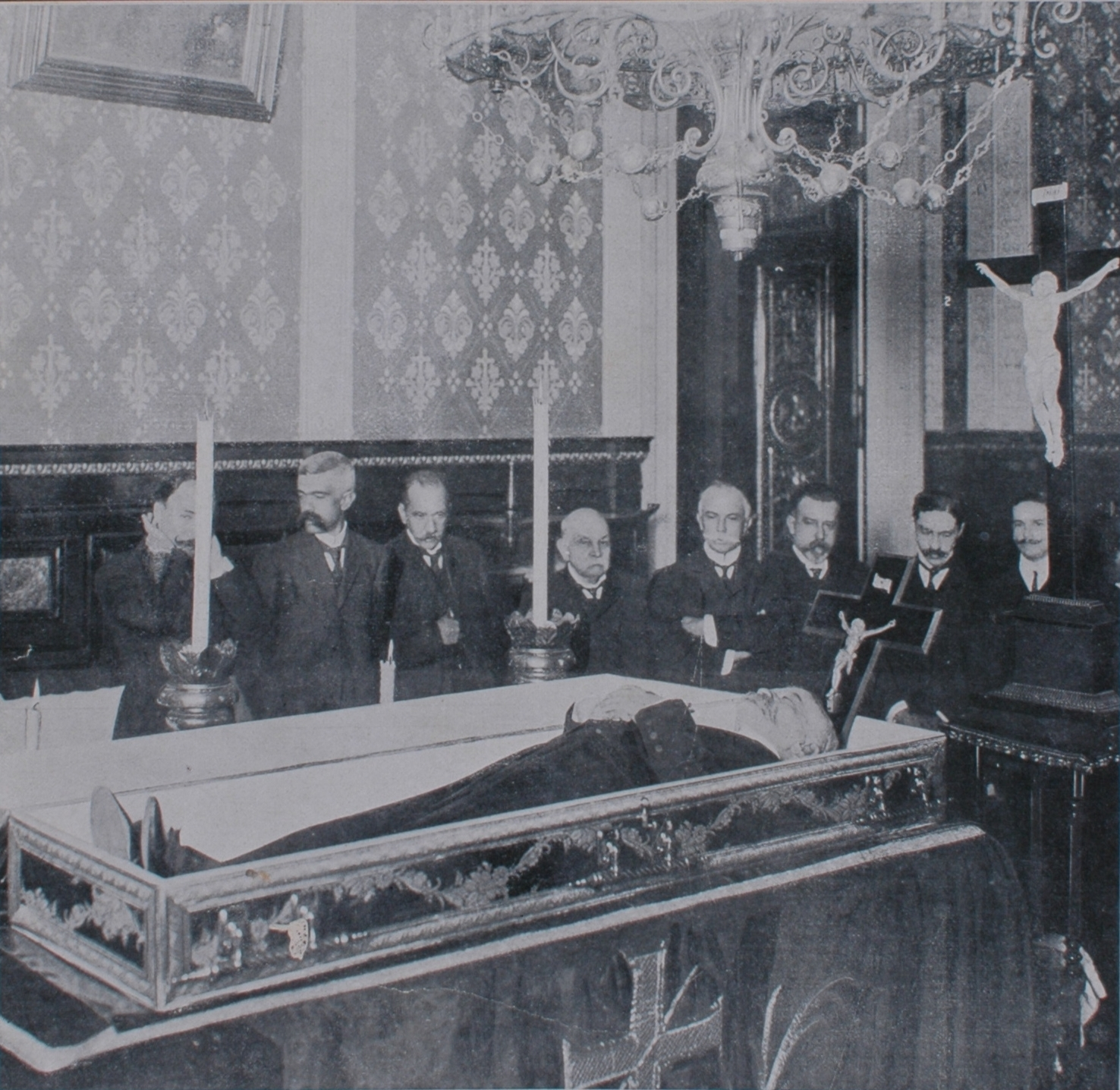
Body of Brazilian president Afonso Pena lying in state in his casket in the Catete Palace, 1909

A coffin may be buried in the ground directly, placed in a burial vault or cremated. Alternatively it may be entombed above ground in a mausoleum, a chapel, a church, or in a loculus within catacombs.

In parts of Sumatra, Indonesia, ancestors are revered and bodies were often kept in coffins alongside the longhouses until a ritual burial can be performed. The dead are also disinterred for rituals. Mass burials are also practiced.

In northern Sulawesi, some dead were kept in above ground sarcophagi called waruga until the practice was banned by the Dutch in the 19th century.

Handles and other ornaments (such as doves, stipple crosses, crucifix, symbols etc.) on the outside of a coffin are called fittings while organizing the inside of the coffin with fabric of some kind is known as "trimming the coffin".

Cultures that practice burial have widely different styles of coffins. In Judaism, the coffin must be plain, made of wood and contain no metal parts or adornments, using wooden pegs instead of nails. In China, coffins made from the scented, decay-resistant wood of cypress, sugi, thuja and incense-cedar are in high demand. Certain Aboriginal Australian groups use intricately decorated tree-bark cylinders sewn with fibre, packed with dried grasses, and sealed with adhesive as coffins.

Sometimes coffins are constructed to permanently display the corpse, as in the case of the glass-covered coffin of the Haraldskær Woman on display in the Church of Saint Nicolai in Vejle, Denmark or the glass-coffins of Vladimir Lenin and Mao Zedong, in Red Square, Moscow and Tiananmen Square, Beijing, respectively.

When a coffin is used to transport a deceased person, it can also be called a pall, a term that also refers to the cloth used to cover the coffin while those who carry a casket are the pallbearers.

== Design ==
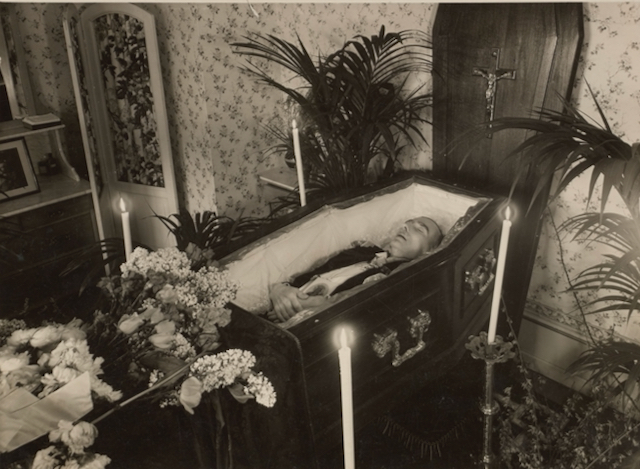
Polish composer Karol Szymanowski lying in his coffin, 1937

Coffins are traditionally made with six sides plus the top (lid) and bottom, tapered around the shoulders, or rectangular with four sides. Another form of four-sided coffin is trapezoidal (also known as the "wedge" form) and is considered a variant of the six-sided hexagonal kind of coffin. Continental Europe at one time favoured the rectangular coffin or casket, although variations exist in size and shape. The rectangular form, and also the trapezoidal form, is still regularly used in Germany, Austria, Hungary and other parts of Eastern and Central Europe, with the lid sometimes made to slope gently from the head down towards the foot. Coffins in the UK are mainly similar to the hexagonal design, but with one-piece sides, curved at the shoulder instead of having a join. In Medieval Japan, round coffins were used, which resembled barrels in shape and were usually made by coopers. In the case of a death at sea, there have been instances where trunks have been pressed into use as coffins. Coffins usually have handles on the side so they will be easier to carry.

They may incorporate features that claim to protect the body or for public health reasons. For example, some may offer a protective casket that uses a gasket to seal the casket shut after it is closed for the final time. In England, it has long been law that a coffin for interment above ground should be sealed; this was traditionally implemented as a wooden outer coffin around a lead lining, around a third inner shell. After some decades have passed, the lead may ripple and tear. In the United States, numerous cemeteries require a vault of some kind in order to bury the deceased. A burial vault serves as an outer enclosure for buried remains and the coffin serves as an inner enclosure. The primary purpose of the vault is to prevent collapse of the coffin due to the weight of the soil above.

Some manufacturers offer a warranty on the structural integrity of the coffin. However, no coffin, regardless of its construction material (e.g., metal rather than wood), whether or not it is sealed, and whether or not the deceased was embalmed beforehand, will perfectly preserve the body. In some cases, a sealed coffin may actually speed up rather than slow down the process of decomposition. An airtight coffin, for example, fosters decomposition by anaerobic bacteria, which results in a putrefied liquefaction of the body, and all putrefied tissue remains inside the container, only to be exposed in the event of an exhumation. A container that allows air to pass in and out, such as a simple wooden box, allows for clean skeletonization. However the situation will vary according to soil or air conditions, and climate.

Coffins are made of many materials, including steel, various types of wood, and other materials such as fiberglass or recycled kraft paper. There is emerging interest in eco-friendly coffins made of purely natural materials such as bamboo, X-Board, willow or banana leaf. In the latter part of the 19th century and the early part of the 20th century in the United States, glass coffins were widely sold by travelling salesmen, who also would try to sell stock of the companies making the coffins.

Custom coffins are occasionally created and some companies also make set ranges with non-traditional designs. These include printing or painting of peaceful tropical scenes, sea-shells, sunsets, cherubim, and patriotic flags. Some manufacturers have designed them to look like gym carry bags, guitar cases, cigar humidors, and even yellow dumpster bins. Other coffins are left deliberately blank so that friends and family can inscribe final wishes and thoughts upon them to the deceased. In Taiwan, coffins made of crushed oyster shells were used in the 18th and 19th centuries. In the 1990s, the rock group Kiss released a customized Kiss Kasket, which featured their trademark makeup designs and Kiss logo and could also be used as a cooler. Pantera guitarist Dimebag Darrell was buried in one.

=== Design coffins in Ghana ===
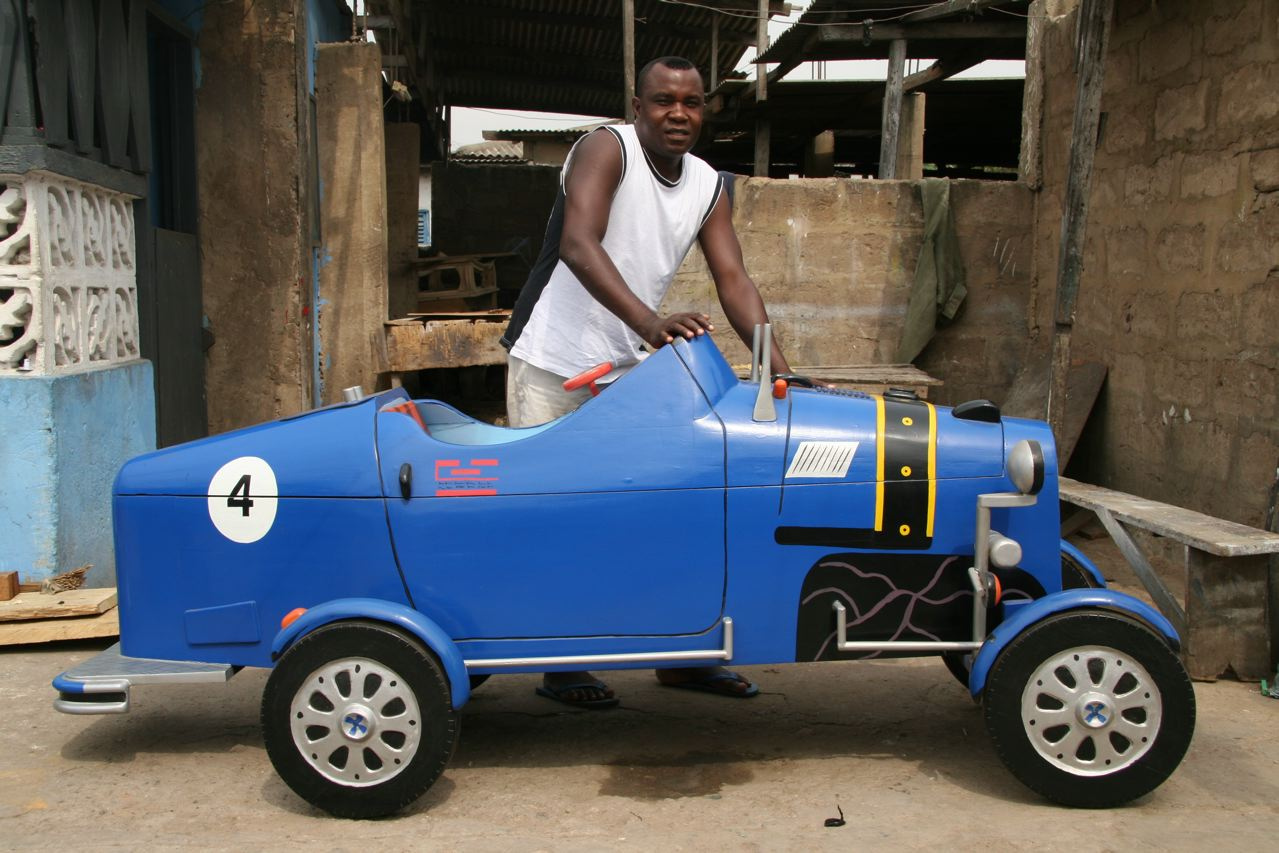
Daniel Mensah (Hello), 2006

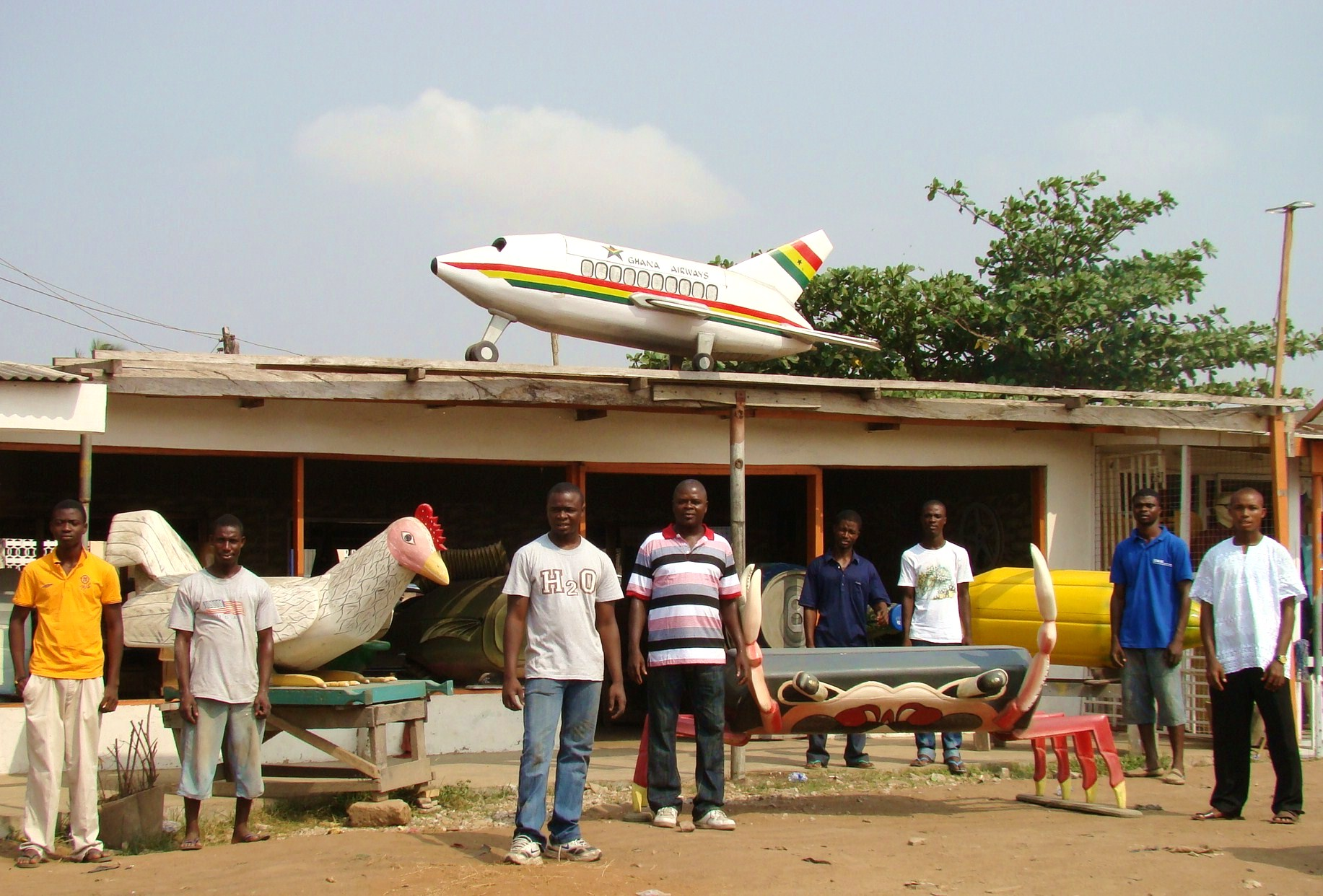
Coffins as an aircraft, a hen, a crab, a cocoa pod in Teshie, Ghana

Design coffins in Ghana, also called Fantasy coffins or figurative coffins, are only made by specialized carpenters in the Greater Accra Region. These colourful objects, which are not only coffins, but considered real works of art, were shown for the first time to a wider Western public in the exhibition Les Magiciens de la terre at the Musée National d’Art Moderne in Paris in 1989. The seven coffins shown in Paris were done by Seth Kane Kwei (1922–1992) and by his former assistant Paa Joe (b. 1947).

Since then coffins of Kane Kweis successors Paa Joe, Daniel Mensah, Kudjoe Affutu or Eric Adjetey Anang and others have been displayed in many international art museums and galleries around the world. The design coffins of the Ga have long been celebrated in the Western art world as the invention of a single, autonomous artist, the coffin maker Kane Kwei (1924–1992) of Teshie. But as Regula Tschumi shows with her recent research this assumption was false. Design coffins have existed already before Kane Kwei and other Ga carpenters like Ataa Oko (1919–2012) from La have built their first figurative coffins around 1950.

Kane Kwei and Ataa Oko had only continued a tradition that already existed in Accra where the kings were using figurative palanquins in the forms of their family symbol. And as those chiefs who were using figurative palanquins had to be buried in a coffin looking like their palanquin, their families used figurative coffins which were formerly nothing else than the copies of the design palanquins.

Today figurative coffins are no longer reserved for the traditional Ga and their kings, many families who use figurative coffins are indeed Christians. For them design coffins no longer possess a spiritual function, their appeal is more aesthetic, aimed at surprising mourners with innovative forms like automobiles or aeroplanes, fish or pigs, onions or tomatoes. So the figurative coffins, rather than constituting a new art form as it was long believed, were developed from the figurative palanquins which had existed already a long time.

== Cremation ==
With the resurgence of cremation in the Western world, manufacturers have begun providing options for those who choose cremation. For a direct cremation a cardboard box is sometimes used. Those who wish to have a funeral visitation (sometimes called a viewing) or traditional funeral service will use a coffin of some sort.

Some choose to use a coffin made of wood or other materials like particle board or low-density fibreboard. Others will rent a regular casket for the duration of the services. These caskets have a removable bed and liner which is replaced after each use. There are also rental caskets with an outer shell that looks like a traditional coffin and a cardboard box that fits inside the shell. At the end of the services the inner box is removed and the deceased is cremated inside this box.

== Industry ==
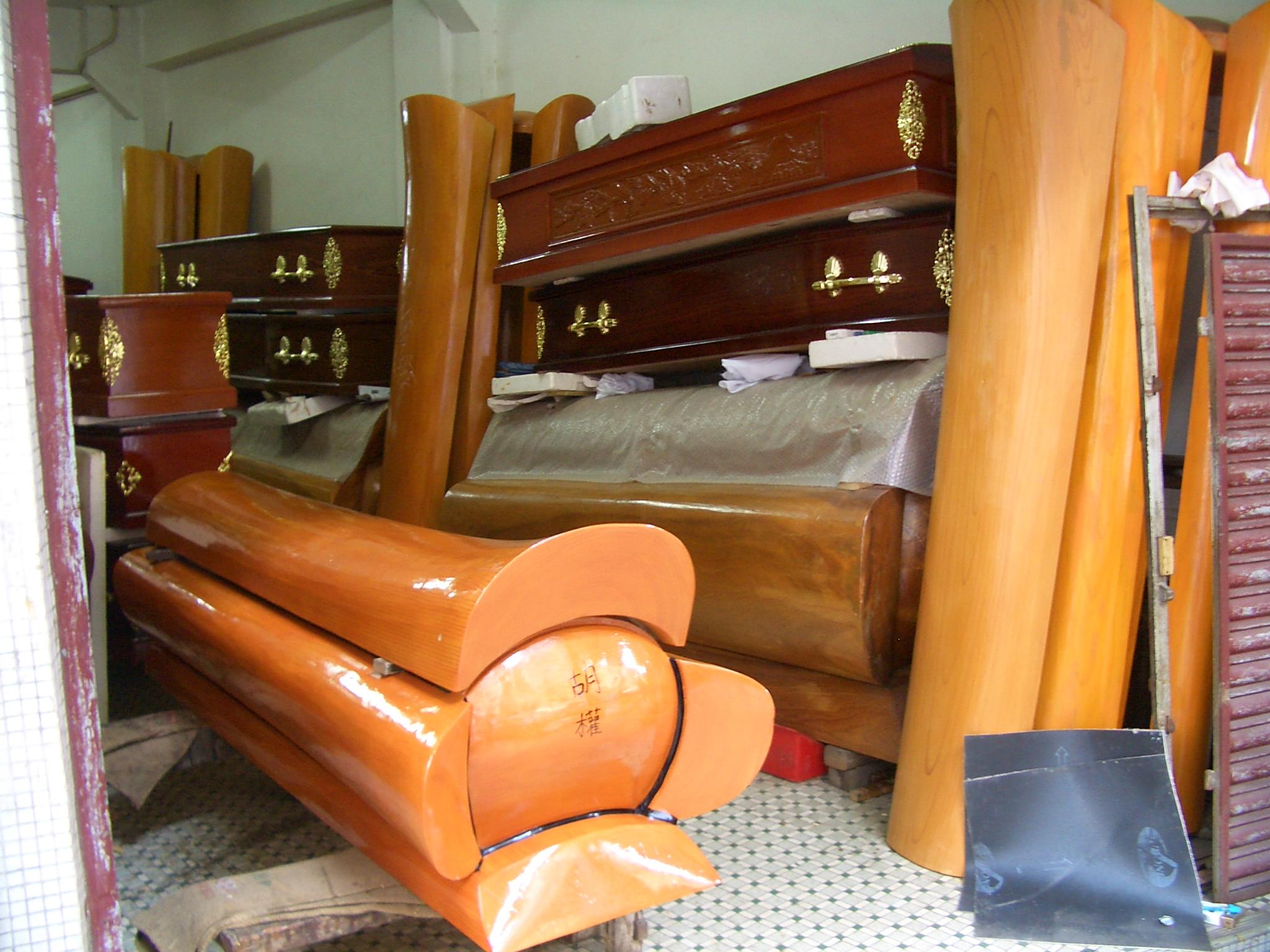
A coffin shop in Macau

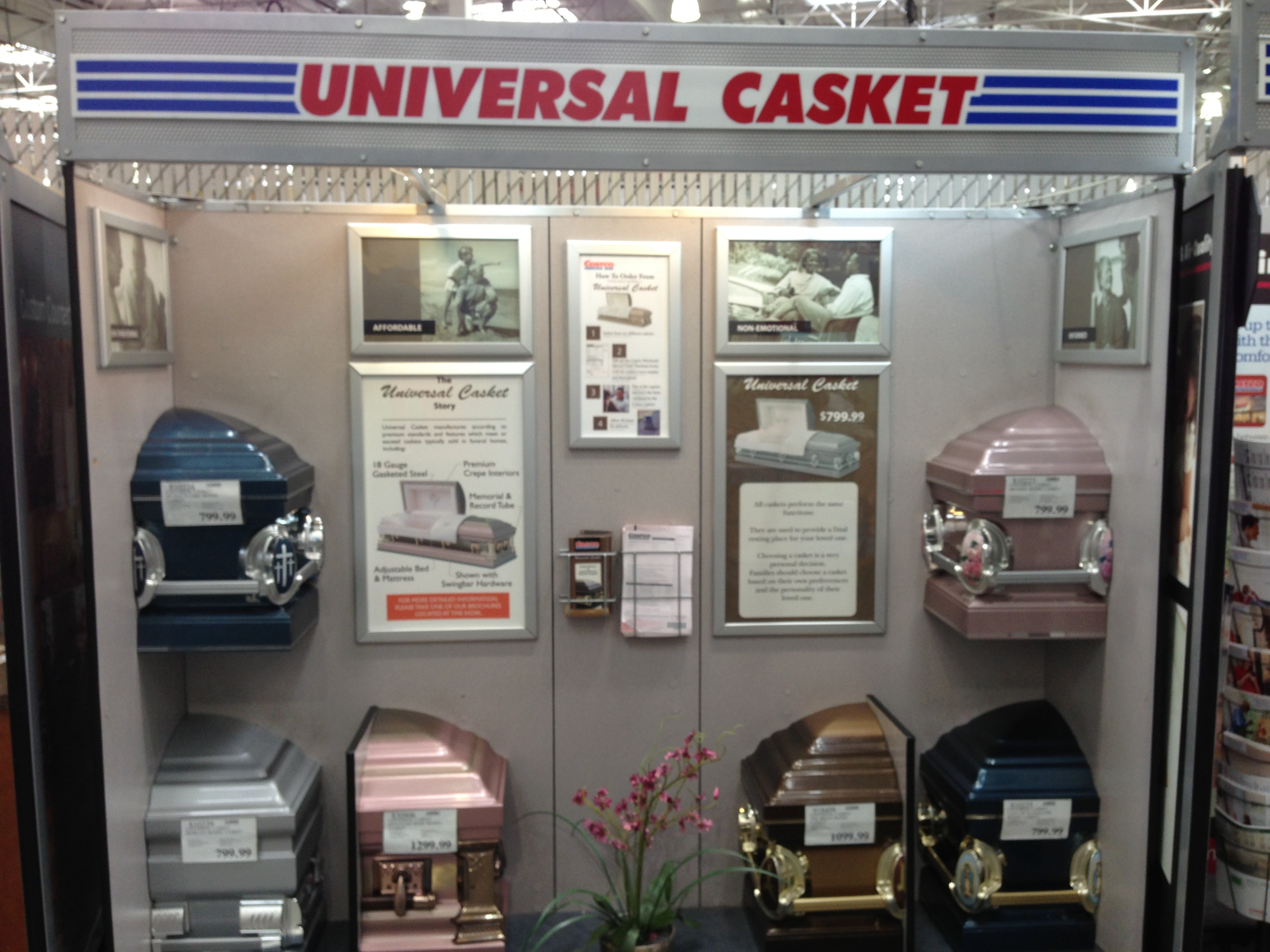
A Universal Casket sales kiosk within a U.S. Costco warehouse retail store in California

Traditionally, in the Western world, a coffin was made, when required, by the village carpenter, who would frequently manage the whole funeral. The design and workmanship would reflect the skills of that individual carpenter, with the materials and brasses being the materials that were available to the carpenter at the time. In past centuries, if a pauper's funeral was paid for by the parish, the coffin might have been made of the cheapest, thinnest possible pine. At the other extreme, a coffin bought privately by a wealthy individual might have used yew or mahogany with a fine lining, plated fittings and brass decorations, topped with a decorated velvet drape.

In modern times coffins are almost always mass-produced. Some manufacturers do not sell directly to the public, and only work with funeral homes. In that case, the funeral director usually sells the casket to a family for a deceased person as part of the funeral services offered, and the price of the casket is included in the total bill for services rendered.

Some funeral homes have small showrooms to present families with the available caskets that could be used for a deceased family member. In many modern funeral homes the showroom will consist of sample pieces that show only the end pieces of each type of coffin that can be used. They also include samples of the lining and other materials. This allows funeral homes to showcase a larger number of coffin styles without the need for a larger showroom. Other types may be available from a catalogue, including decorative paint effects or printed photographs or patterns.

Under a United States federal regulation, 16 CFR Part 453 (known as the Funeral Rule), if a family provides a casket they purchased elsewhere (for example from a United States retail warehouse store, as illustrated here), the establishment is required to accept the casket and use it in the services. If the casket is delivered direct to the funeral home from the manufacturer or store, they are required to accept delivery of the casket. The funeral home may not add any extra charges or fees to the overall bill if a family decides to purchase a casket elsewhere. If the casket was bought from the funeral home, these regulations require bills to be completely itemized.

== See also ==
- Anthropoid ceramic coffins
- Bier
- Cenotaph
- Coffin plate
- Economy coffin
- Hanging coffins
- Ossuary
- Sarcophagus
- Treetrunk coffin

== Bibliography ==
- Regula Tschumi: "The Figurative Palanquins of the Ga. History and Significance", in: African Arts, Vol. 46, Nr. 4, 2013, pp. 60–73.
- Roberta Bonetti" Alternate Histories of the Abebuu Adekai". African Arts, Vol. 43, No. 3, 2010, pp. 14–33.
- Thierry Secretan: Going into darkness: Fantastic coffins from Africa. London 1995.
- Regula Tschumi: The Buried Treasures of the Ga. Coffin Art in Ghana. Benteli, 2008. ISBN 978-3-7165-1520-4.
