= Stormy Kromer cap =

Woolen hat

The Stormy Kromer cap is a woolen hat manufactured by Stormy Kromer Mercantile. The hat is popular in the Midwestern United States and with hunters and outdoorsmen. It is named for George "Stormy" Kromer (1876–1970), a semiprofessional baseball player from Kaukauna, Wisconsin, who later worked as a railroad engineer.

== History ==
Kromer lost many hats to the wind while working on trains, and in 1903, he asked his wife Ida (1877–1960) to make him a warm hat that would stay on more securely. She modified a baseball cap into what became the Stormy Kromer cap by sewing on a pair of ear flaps. A summer version, made from pillow ticking, remains in use among modern American train engineers, and variants with red or blue polka dots were formerly popular in the early 20th century.

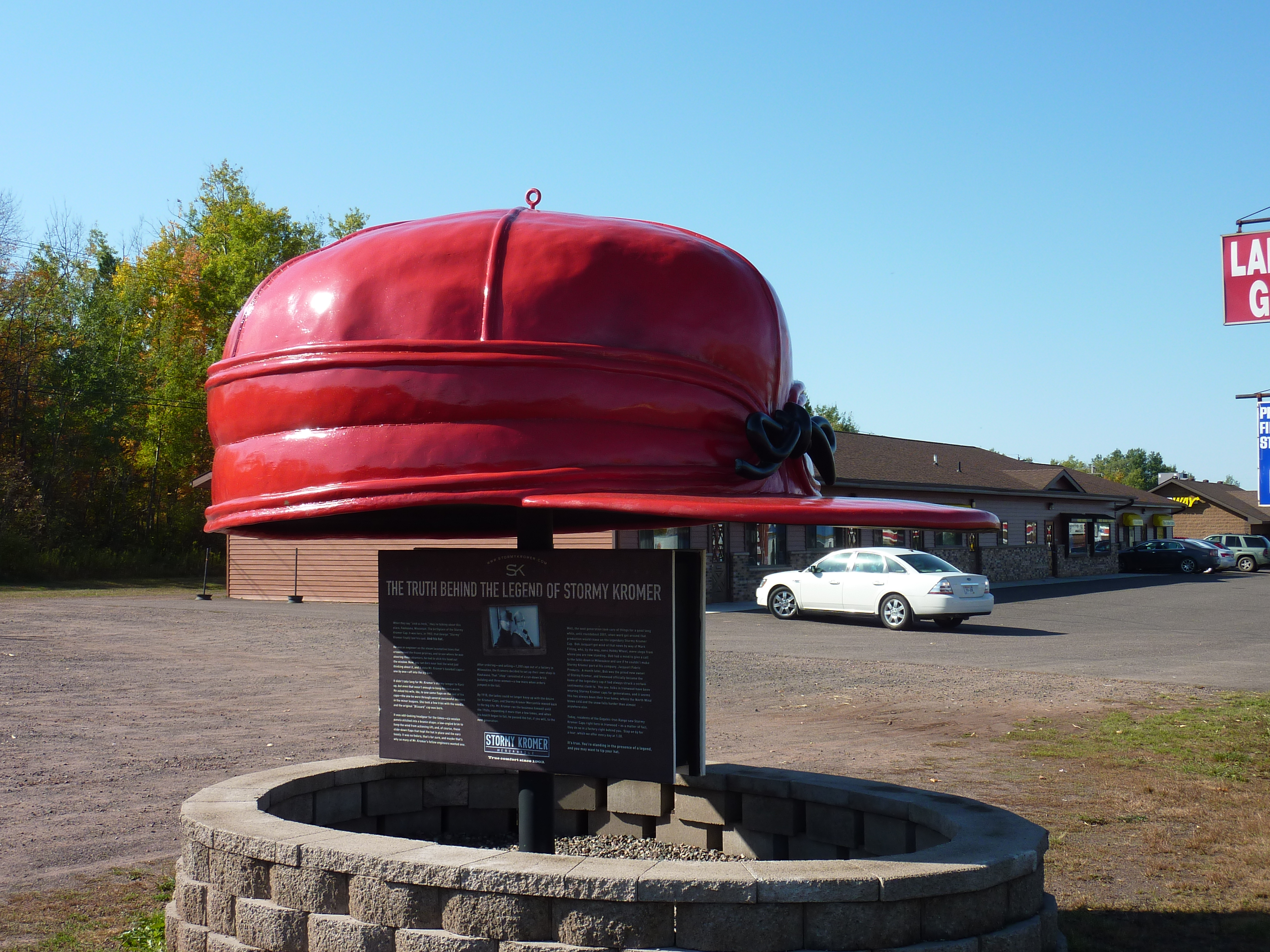
Statue of a Stormy Kromer cap located near the factory in Ironwood, Michigan

Due to popularity with other employees of the railroad, the Kromers formed the Kromer Cap Company in 1903 to produce the caps. In 1919, responding to ever increasing demand, the Kromers opened a factory in Milwaukee, Wisconsin. George Kromer sold the company in 1965 to Richard Grossman. In 2001, the Kromer Cap Company planned to cease production of Stormy Kromer caps. The rights to the caps were purchased by Bob Jacquart, owner of Jacquart Fabric Products, and production moved to Ironwood, Michigan. Stormy Kromer Mercantile was formed, increasing production to over 50,000 caps annually from the previous 3000 to 6000 caps.

President Barack Obama was presented with several Stormy Kromer caps when he visited Marquette, Michigan, on February 10, 2011. It has become a traditional garb in the Upper Peninsula.

A version that is a "tip of the hat" to the hat's Wisconsin roots is available in Green Bay Packers green with the team logo and sold through Lambeau Field.

The hats are unusual in that they carry a lifetime warranty against defects, and a three-year "insurance policy" for events such as loss, once the product is registered. Versions for women are available, and they are called the "Ida Kromer" or some variant of "Petal Pusher."

== See also ==
- List of hat styles
- Aviator hat
- Deerstalker
- Trapper hat
