= Trapdoor =

Sliding or hinged door that is flush with the surface of a floor, ceiling, or roof

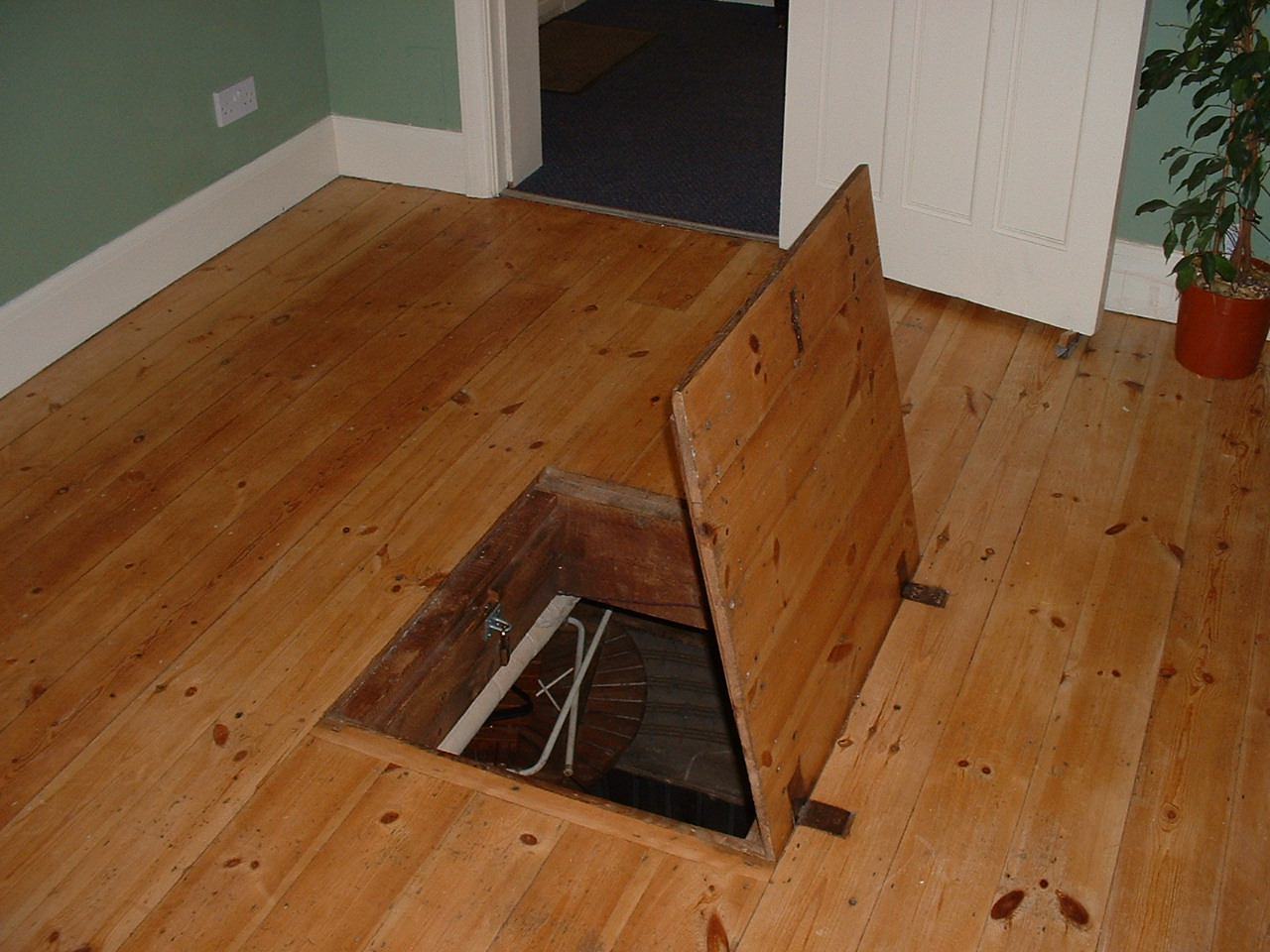
A trapdoor to a bomb shelter from World War II

A trapdoor or hatch is a sliding or hinged door that is flush with the surface of a floor, ceiling, or roof. It is traditionally small in size. It was invented to facilitate the hoisting of grain up through mills, however, its list of uses has grown over time. The trapdoor has played a pivotal function in the operation of the gallows, cargo ships, trains, booby traps, and more recently theatre and films.

== History ==
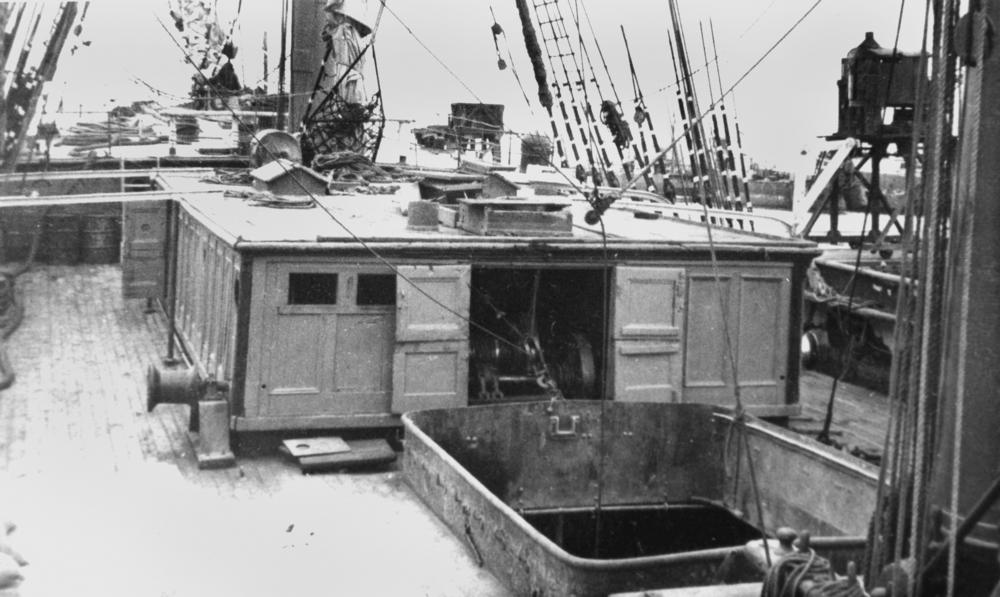
Deck hatch of the Omega, the last square-rigged sailing cargo ship

Originally, trapdoors were sack traps in mills, and allowed the sacks to pass up through the mill while naturally falling back to a closed position.

Many buildings with flat roofs have hatches that provide access to the roof. On ships, hatches—usually not flush, and never called trapdoors—provide access to the deck. Cargo ships, including bulk carriers, have large hatches for access to the holds.

== Gallows ==
Most 19th- and early 20th-century gallows featured a trapdoor, usually with two flaps. The condemned was placed at the join. The edge of a trapdoor furthest from the hinge accelerates faster than gravity, so that the condemned does not hit the flaps but falls freely.

== Coffins ==
In 1784, the reusable economy coffin was mandated by Joseph II, Holy Roman Emperor. The coffins had a trapdoor in their base. The coffin would be lowered into the grave and a lever operated that opened the trapdoor, allowing the body to fall to the bottom of the grave.

== Railways ==
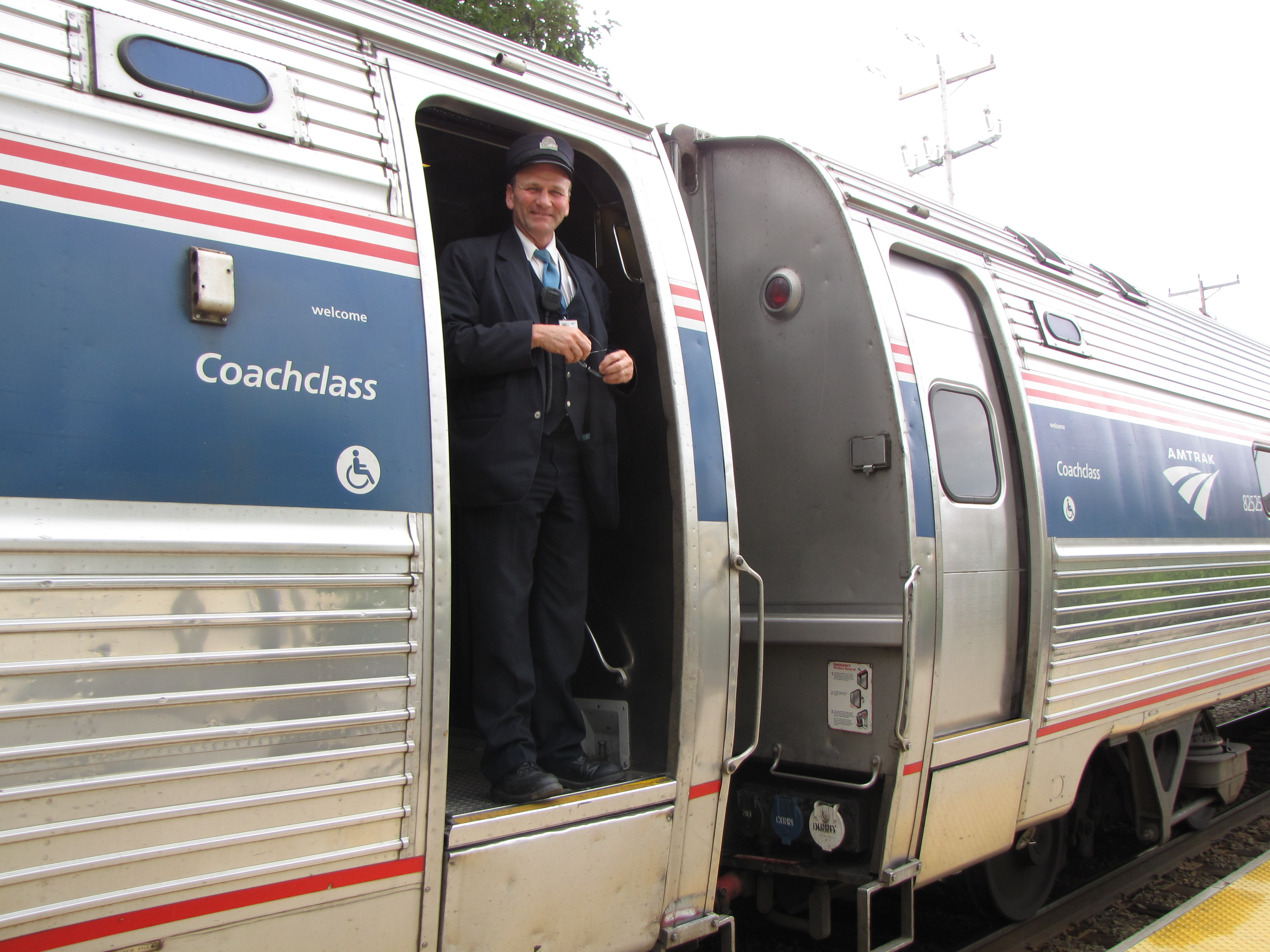
Amtrak conductors standing in the doorways of Amfleet cars with their trapdoors in the closed (above) and open (below) positions

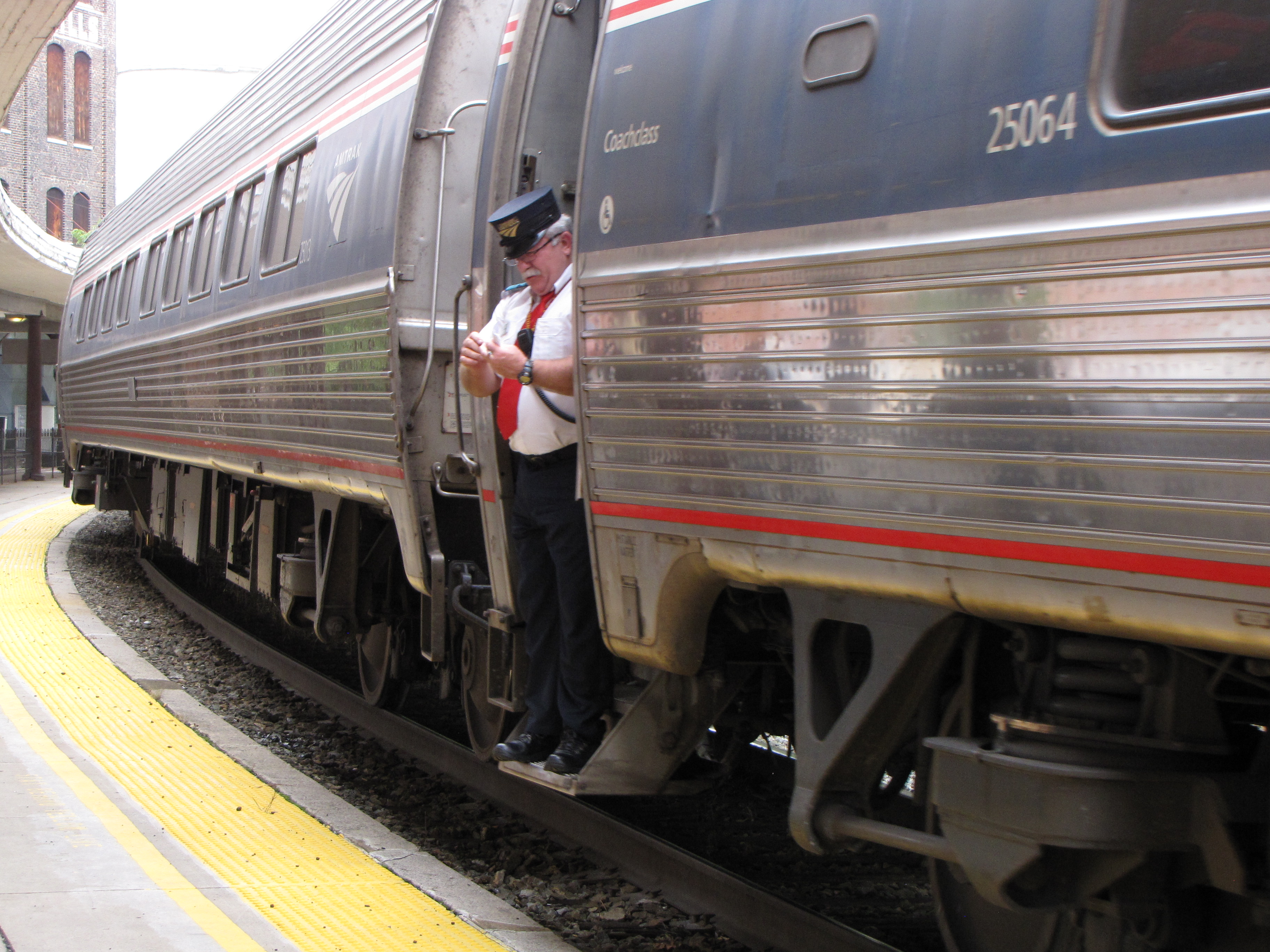

The term trapdoor also refers to a plate in the entry vestibule of a passenger railcar that permits access to high-level platforms when lying flat against the floor of the car, and which can be flipped open to expose steps for accessing ground-level platforms. Many American commuter railroads which operate the Comet railcars made by Bombardier have trapdoors to accommodate passengers boarding and alighting on both high-level and ground-level platforms. Amtrak's Viewliner, Amfleet, and Horizon railcar fleets all have trapdoors.

== Biology ==
Trapdoor spiders hide in an underground nest they line with their silk, and then conceal it with a hinged silk lid, the trapdoor.

== Star traps in theatre ==
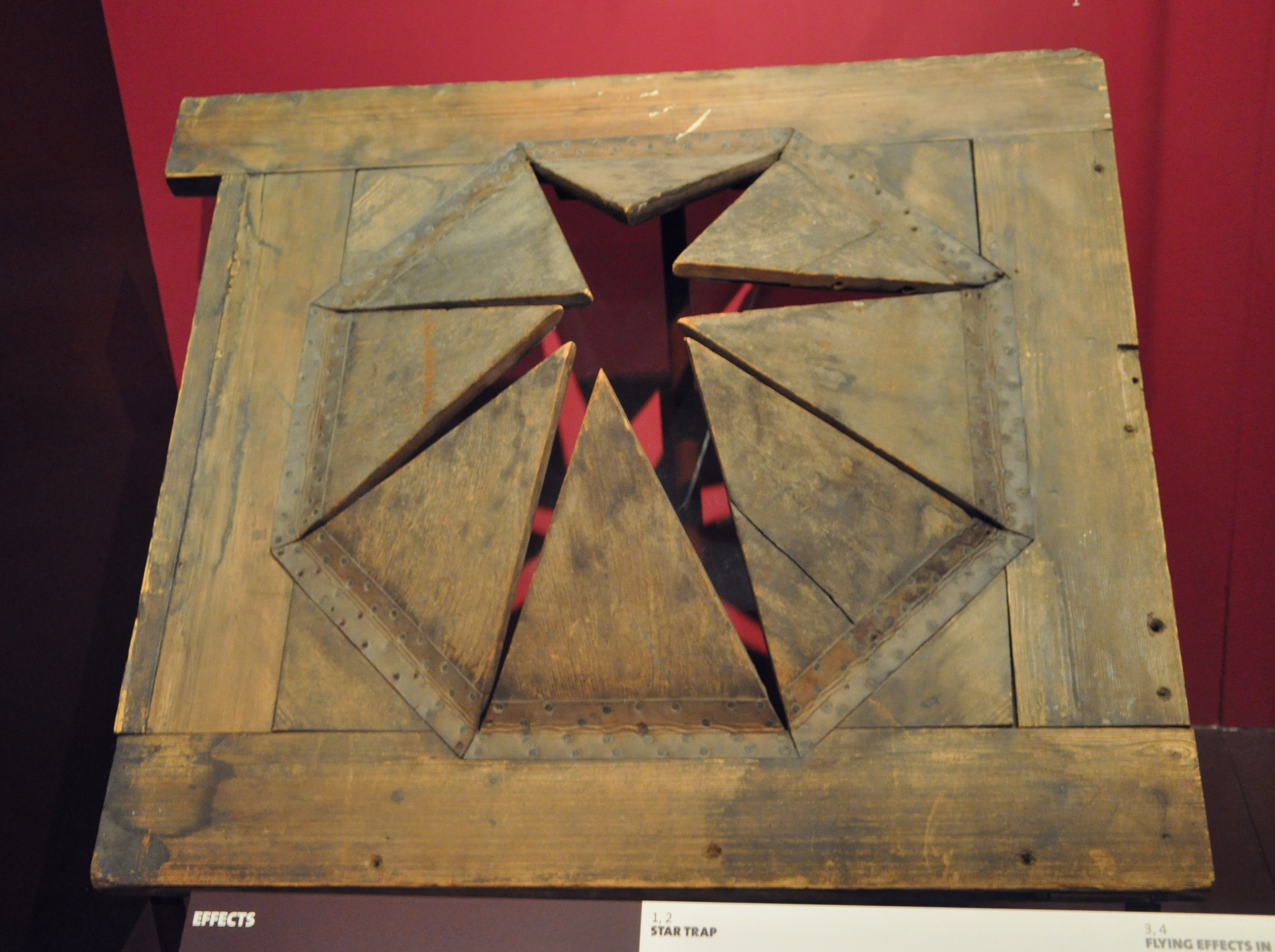
19th century Star trap from the Theatre Royal, Drury Lane, London, Now at the Victoria and Albert Museum

In theatrical use, "star traps" allowed extremely fast appearances on stage, such as jinn appearing in a puff of smoke.

== Fiction ==
Trapdoors are occasionally used as hidden doors in fiction, as entrances to secret passageways, dungeons, or to secret tunnels. They also appear as literal traps into which a hapless pedestrian may fall if they happen to step on one. Different types of doors or other objects are also sometimes used as hidden doors.

A trapdoor figures prominently in a late scene of the 1963 film Charade.

== See also ==
- Trap (disambiguation)
- Angstloch
- Trapdoor function
- Patio
