= Trap, Mogila =

Trap Трап
- Village
- Location within North Macedonia
- Coordinates: 41.132919°N 21.469538°E
- Country: North Macedonia
- Region: Pelagonia
- Municipality: Mogila

Population (2002)
  - Total: 175
- Time zone: UTC+1 (CET)
  - Summer (DST): UTC+2 (CEST)
- Website: .

Trap (Macedonian: Трап) is a small village in the municipality of Mogila, North Macedonia. It used to be part of the former municipality of Dobruševo.

== Demographics ==
According to the 2002 census, the village had a total of 175 inhabitants. Ethnic groups in the village include:

- Macedonians 174
- Others 1
