= Sand trap =

A sand trap can be:

- Bunker (golf), a hazard in the game of golf
- Catch points, designed to stop runaway railroad cars
- Run-off area, designed to stop runaway race cars
