= Trapped =

Trapped may refer to:

== Films ==
- Trapped (1931 film), a crime drama short starring Lina Basquette
- Trapped (1937 film), an American western starring Charles Starrett
- Trapped (1949 film), a film noir directed by Richard Fleischer
- Trapped (1973 film), a television film starring James Brolin
- Trapped (1982 film), a horror film starring Henry Silva
- Trapped (1989 film), a television film starring Kathleen Quinlan
- Trapped (2001 film), a television film starring William McNamara
- Trapped (2002 film), a thriller starring Charlize Theron
- Trapped (2013 film), an Iranian drama film
- Trapped (2015 film), an Armenian action thriller starring Sos Janibekyan
- Trapped (2016 American film), an American documentary film
- Trapped (2016 Hindi film), an Indian survival film
- Trapped! (2006), a television film starring Alexandra Paul
- Trapped: Haitian Nights, a 2010 thriller starring Vivica A. Fox

== Literature ==
- Trapped (Gardner novel), a 2002 novel in the League of Peoples series by James Alan Gardner
- Trapped (Hearne novel), a 2012 novel in the Iron Druid Chronicles series by Kevin Hearne
- Trapped, a children's novel by Peg Kehret
- "Trapped", a 1989 short story by Dean Koontz, later issued as a graphic novel
- Trapped, a Fear Street novel by R. L. Stine
- Trapped, 1982 book about Floyd Collins by Robert K. Murray and Roger W. Brucker.

== Music ==
- Trapped! (album), by Rage, 1992

=== Songs ===
- "Trapped" (Colonel Abrams song), 1985
- "Trapped" (Jimmy Cliff song), 1972; covered by Bruce Springsteen and the E Street Band, 1985
- "Trapped" (Tupac Shakur song), 1991
- "Trapped", by Indus Creed, 1995
- "Trapped", by Chastity Belt from Time to Go Home, 2015
- "Trapped", by E-40 from Revenue Retrievin': Graveyard Shift, 2011
- "Trapped", by the Living End from The Living End, 1998
- "Trapped", by Proof from the compilation album Eminem Presents: The Re-Up, 2006
- "Trapped", by Soulidium from Children of Chaos, 2007
- "Trapped", by Yo Gotti from Untrapped, 2020

== Television ==
=== Series ===
- Trapped (1950 TV series), an American dramatic anthology series
- Trapped (2007 TV series), a National Geographic documentary series
- Trapped! (TV series), a 2007–2010 British children's programme
- Trapped (Australian TV series), a 2008–2009 children's drama series
- Trapped (Icelandic TV series), a 2015–2019 mystery series

=== Episodes ===
- "Trapped" (CSI: NY), 2005
- "Trapped" (The Honeymooners), 1956
- "Trapped" (The Lost World), 2002
- "Trapped" (ThunderCats), 1985
- "Trapped" (Tugs), 1989

== See also ==
- Trap (disambiguation)
- Trapt, an American post-grunge/alternative metal band
- Trapt (album), a 2002 album by the band
- Trapt (video game), a 2005 PlayStation 2 game
