= Trapper (disambiguation) =

A trapper is a person who uses devices to catch animals.

Trapper may also refer to:

== Places ==
- Trapper Lake (disambiguation), several lakes
- Trapper Mountain, Washington, United States
- Trapper Peak (Canada), a mountain in the Waputik Range, on the border between Alberta and British Columbia
- Trapper Peak (Montana), United States, a mountain in the Selway-Bitterroot Wilderness Area

== Fictional characters ==
- Trapper (Dungeons & Dragons), monster type found in some fantasy role-playing games
- Trapper John McIntyre, a character in the M*A*S*H franchise
- Trapper, a character in The Son of Bigfoot and Bigfoot Family

== Sports ==
- Trapper (ice hockey), goaltending equipment
- Tilburg Trappers, a Dutch hockey team
- Edmonton Trappers, a Canadian former minor league baseball team
- Fitchburg Trappers, a defunct American minor league ice hockey team
- Salt Lake City Trappers, a short-lived American former minor league baseball team
- Trapper, the mascot for Fort Vancouver High School, Vancouver, Washington

== Other uses ==
- Chris Trapper (born 1971), American songwriter
- Trapper Nelson (1909–1968), American trapper, hunter and founder of a zoo in Florida
- Trapper Schoepp, American singer-songwriter
- Coal trapper, a person who operates a trap door in a coal mine
- Trapper hat, a fur hat similar to an ushanka
- Trapper, a slang term for a person who partakes in the illegal drug trade
- Trapper, a pattern of pocketknife
- Trapper, file folder storable in a Trapper Keeper binder

== See also ==
- Albert Johnson (criminal) (died 1932), Canadian fugitive nicknamed the "Mad Trapper"
