= The Trap (bar) =

Historic bar in America

Coordinates: 38.5154°N 121.5263°W

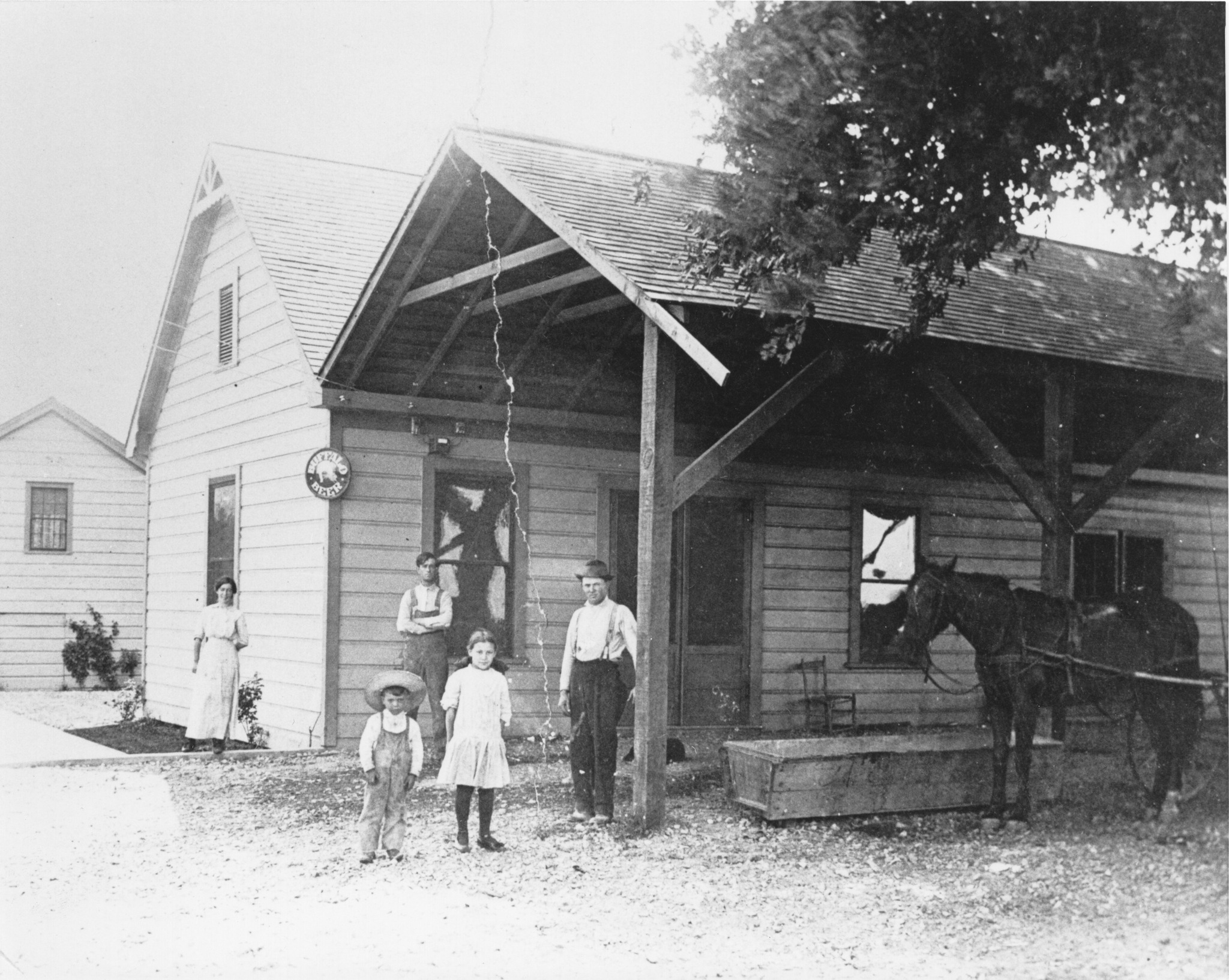
- Location: 6125 Riverside Blvd, Sacramento, California
- Built: c. 1860 - 1880
- Original use: bar and grocery store
- Website: https://www.thetrapsac.com/

The Trap, originally known as the Ingleside Saloon, is a historic bar in Sacramento, California. It is one of the city's oldest continuously operated businesses and the oldest surviving structure in the city's Pocket-Greenhaven neighborhood. In 2009, the City of Sacramento designated The Trap a historical landmark, noting that the building is one of the oldest and last remaining structures associated with the Portuguese agricultural community that were among the first settlers of the Pocket-Greenhaven neighborhood.

The Trap claims to be the oldest bar in Sacramento. The Sacramento Bee documents the Ingleside Saloon opening on October 2, 1897. In 1964, a new owner changed the name to The Trap.

== History ==
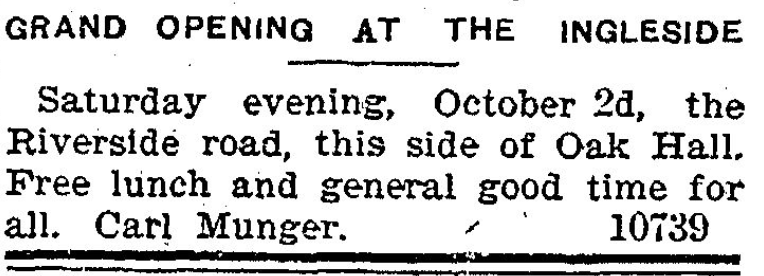
The Evening Bee (Oct. 1, 1897)

The Trap's building was constructed between 1860 and 1880. The location has been continuously operated as a bar and grocery store since at least 1885, known variously as the Ingleside, Ingleside Saloon, Ingleside Inn, and Pimentel's Ingleside Cafe. In the late 1800s, the business would have been about four miles south of Sacramento's city limits and about two miles south of the Sutterville settlement.

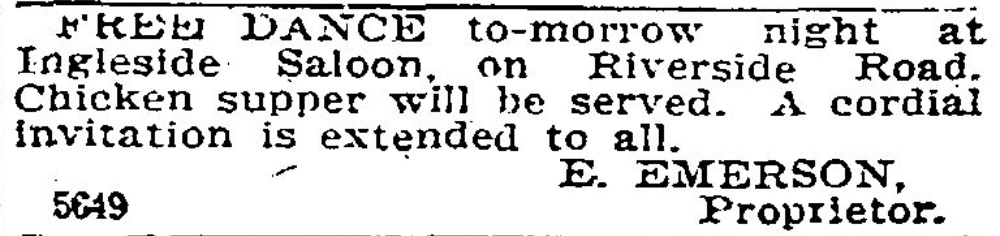
The Evening Bee (May 18, 1900)

In 1897, a notice in the Sacramento Bee announced a "grand opening" of "the Ingleside" under management by Carl Munger. By 1900, the business was operating as the Ingleside Saloon under management by E. Emerson.

In 1912, Tony Pimentel and his brother-in-law, Ernest Savoie, bought the business and operated it as the Ingleside Inn. The business featured two separate entrances: a main entrance (“for the men”) to the bar room and a side entrance (“for women and children”) to the store room. At some point, Tony's wife, Maggie, took over operations and tried to rebrand the business as Pimentel's Ingleside Café, but the Sacramento Bee continued to refer to the business as the Ingleside Inn through the 1920s and beyond. The Pimentels sold the business in 1930.

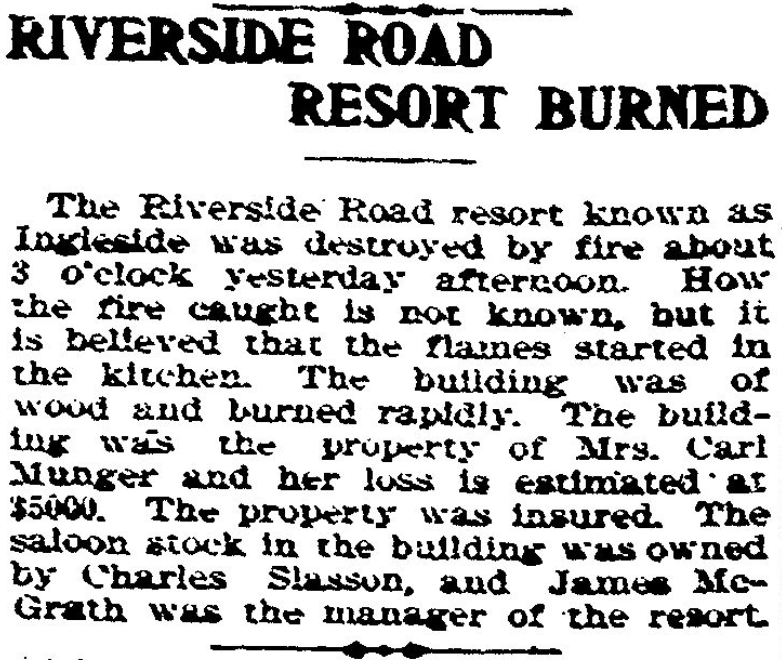
The Evening Bee (August 8, 1902)

The business's original building was likely destroyed by a fire in 1902. After the 1902 fire, the business likely moved its operations to the current structure, a building next to the Pimentel family farmhouse, a few lots north of The Trap's current location. A photograph from around 1915 shows the business operating out of the current structure, with the Pimentel family farmhouse in the close background. In 1924, the current structure was moved a short distance south to its present location near the intersection at 6125 Riverside Boulevard. After the move, the Pimentels made additions to the building.

Throughout the Prohibition era (1920–1933), the Ingleside Inn was a site of repeated arrests for continuing to sell liquor, but the business survived and established itself as an important cultural center in the Pocket-Greenhaven neighborhood, then a predominantly Portuguese immigrant community. "These cafes ... were a very important social gathering place, especially for Portuguese men. As in Portugal, the men would come to these cafes and congregate during lunch or after work."

In 1964, Eilene Strange bought the business and changed the name to The Trap. She apparently joked with her friends that they should "come see the little trap I have bought."

In 2022, the Lukenbill family purchased The Trap. Gregg Lukenbill is the former owner of the Sacramento Kings.

The Trap has a long tradition of being managed by women, including Maggie Pimentel, Eilene Strange (owner in the 1960s), Kathi Crudo (owner from 1983 to 2004), sisters Veronica and Jenn Crudo (owners from 2010 to 2022), and now Mariah Lukenbill.

== See also ==
- Ruhstaller Building
- Old Tavern
- California Historical Landmarks in Sacramento County, California
- History of Sacramento, California
