= Trapper Lake =

Trapper Lake may refer to:

- Trapper Lake (Alaska)
- Trapper Lake (Chelan County, Washington) in North Cascades National Park
- Trapper Lake (Teton County, Wyoming) in Grand Teton National Park
