= Trapper hat =

Trapper hat of trapper's hat may refer to:

- Coonskin cap
- Ushanka
