= Economy coffin =

Type of 18th century reusable coffin

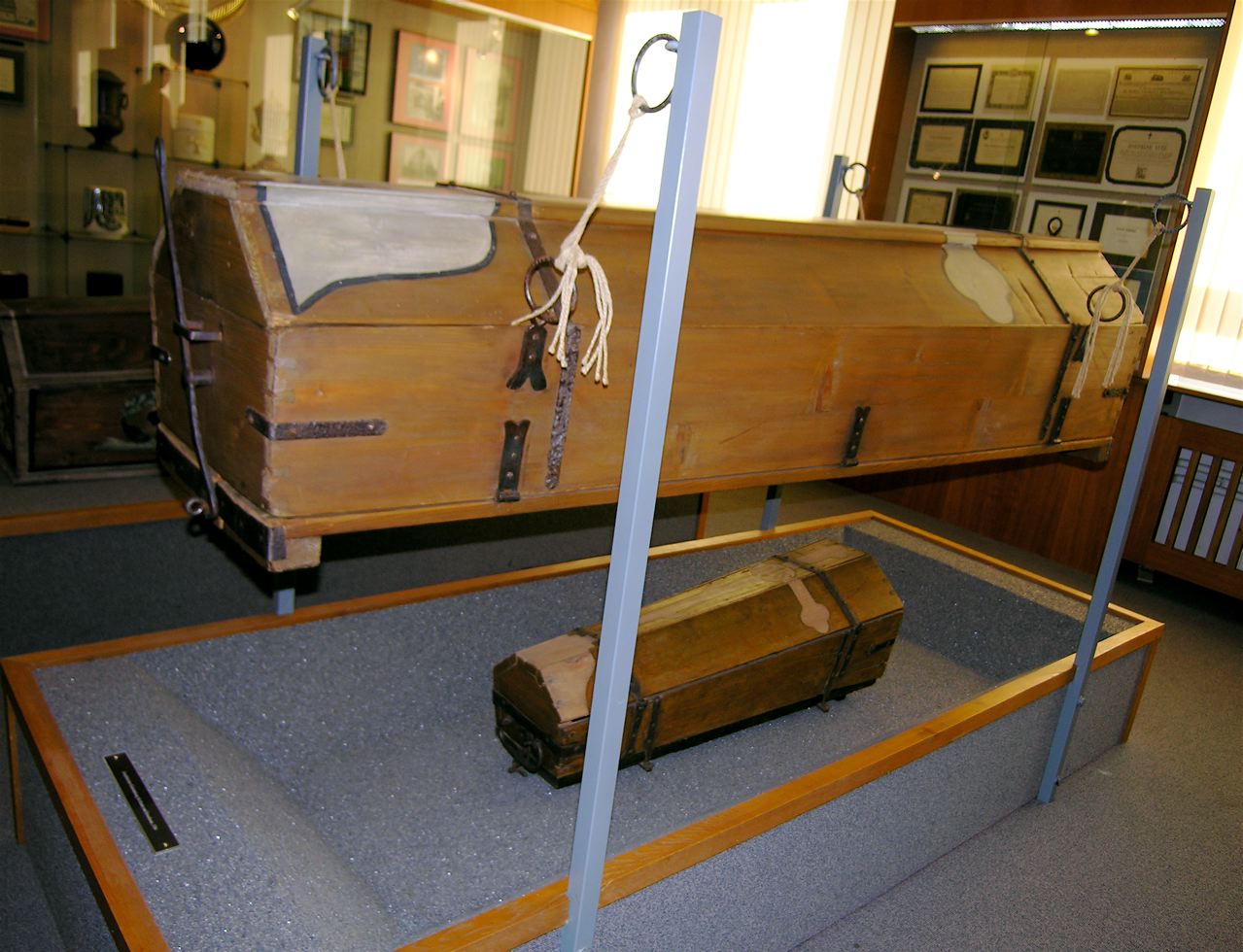
Surviving example in the Funeral Museum Vienna

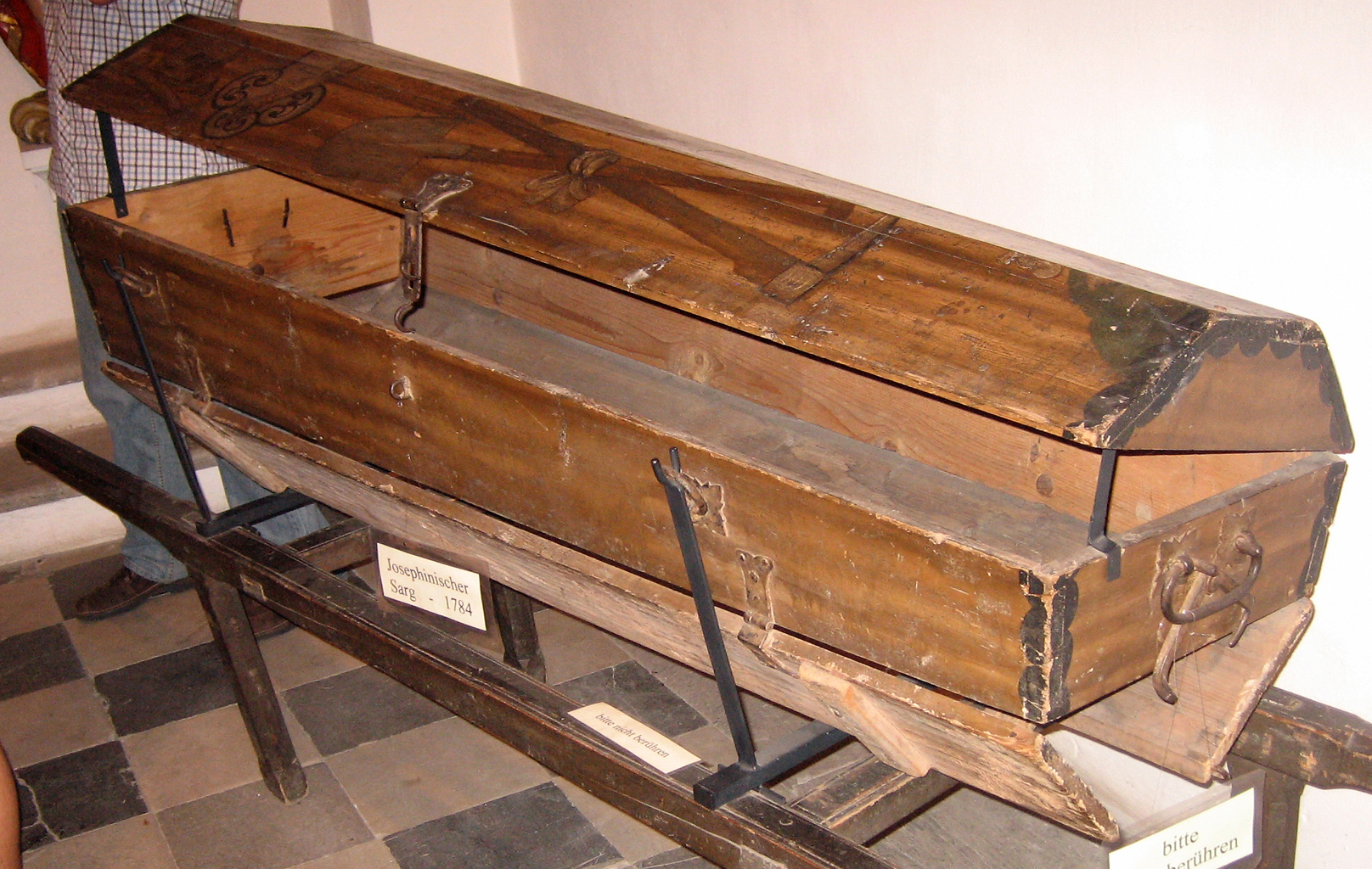
An example showing the bottom part opened

The economy coffin, hinged coffin or Josephinian coffin (German: Sparsarg, Klappsärge, or Josephinischer Sarg) was a type of reusable coffin introduced by Joseph II, Holy Roman Emperor in the late 18th century. The body was carried in the coffin to the gravesite where it would be dropped into the grave through folding doors on the base. The coffin would then be reused.

== Background ==
Joseph II was a reforming ruler who advocated Enlightenment principles. He was a keen proponent of natural law and adhered less strictly to Christian dogma than his predecessors. Many of his reforms were utilitarian in nature and also served to extend the reach of the state.

Joseph made several decrees relating to burials, for reasons of hygiene. He introduced legally mandated periods between death and burial and required examination of the deceased by a medical professional. Joseph prohibited burials within church vaults in Vienna in 1782, requiring that burials take place outside the city boundary. He extended this decree to the whole of Austria in 1783 and the rest of the Habsburg lands in 1784. He also discouraged visits to cemeteries except for the purpose of burial.

== Coffin ==
In August 1784, Joseph ordered that all burials would be made with reusable coffins. This would prevent what he considered to be a waste of wood. He also proclaimed that the deceased should be buried naked so that their clothes could be reused by others. Joseph also considered that the measures would allow for the quicker decomposition of the body, which he thought more hygienic and that would allow for the earlier reuse of the grave.

Joseph decreed that each parish would construct sufficient economy coffins for their needs. These coffins were constructed with trapdoors in their base. The body would be placed naked into a sack and transported to the gravesite in the coffin. The coffin would be lowered into the grave and a lever operated that opened the trapdoor, allowing the body to fall to the bottom of the grave. The coffin would then be returned to the parish for reuse at future burials. Similar coffins had sometimes been used in the medieval period during times of high mortality such as plague epidemics.

The coffin proved to be one of the most controversial of all Joseph's reforms, receiving considerable resistance from the general public, the church and his own government officials. Joseph withdrew the order after six months, though his other burial reforms remained in place. Joseph was himself buried in a coffin after his 1790 death, though it was of plain copper construction rather than the elaborately detailed coffins of his predecessors.
