= Rainbow Honor Walk =

LGBT monument in USA

Coordinates: 37.75913°N 122.43681°W

The Rainbow Honor Walk (RHW) is a walk of fame installation in San Francisco, California to honor notable lesbian, gay, bisexual, transgender, and queer (LGBTQ) individuals from around the world "who left a lasting mark on society." Its bronze plaques honor LGBTQ individuals who "made significant contributions in their fields". The plaques mark a walk located within the business district of the Castro neighborhood, which for decades has been the city's center of LGBTQ activism and culture.

The project was founded by David Perry to honor LGBTQ pioneers, who are considered to have laid the groundwork for LGBTQ rights, and to teach future generations about them. The sidewalk installations are planned to extend from the Harvey Milk Civil Rights Academy at 19th Street & Collingwood, to proceed along Castro Street to its intersection with Market Street, and follow Market to the San Francisco LGBTQ Community Center at Octavia Boulevard; additionally the Walk will branch out in both directions at 18th Street and Castro. The RHW eventually could number up to 500 honorees. The first round of twenty plaques was installed in 2014, a second round of twenty-four was completed in 2019.

A separate sidewalk installation, the Castro Street History Walk, is a series of twenty historical fact plaques about the neighborhood—ten from pre-1776 to the 1960s before the Castro became known as a gay neighborhood, and ten "significant events associated with the queer community in the Castro"—contained within the 400 and 500 blocks of the street between 19th and Market streets.

== History ==
In the late 1980s David Perry, a gay man "whose public relations firm has handled everything from the Olympic Torch Relay in 2008 and the 2016 Super Bowl 50 Committee," had an epiphany while walking past the Castro Theater in San Francisco's Castro district, the cultural center of the city's LGBTQ communities for decades; and his home since 1986. The neighborhood was one of the country's epicenters during the height of the HIV/AIDS pandemic before the AIDS cocktail in the 1990s; and during the city's response to slow the impact on the gay male community. Perry said,

"I was very cognizant of the fact we were losing a generation of people. And I was thinking: What happens if there's no one here to tell our story? We need to memorialize our history, because if we don't, nobody else will. Or they'll tell it in the wrong way."

The Bay Area Reporter noted five of the inaugural twenty: Keith Haring, activist George Choy, Sylvester, Randy Shilts, and Tom Waddell; all died from AIDS. Perry envisioned a Hollywood Walk of Fame but for LGBTQ people to reach future generations. Gayle Rubin, a "scholar of San Francisco LGBTQ history and professor of anthropology and women's studies at the University of Michigan" stated, "Marginal groups and those who are disrespected for various reasons tend to not have their accomplishments recognized in public landmarks." The RHW could eventually include 500 honorees.

In 1994, Perry proposed the LGBTQ walk of fame to the San Francisco Board of Supervisors and LGBTQ community leaders including the Castro Business District (CBD). All approved the concept. The CBD would later serve as the fiscal sponsor until the RHW was an independent charity. Because of the more urgent needs related to the HIV/AIDS pandemic in San Francisco, the project and its fundraising goals were put on hold. Separately in 2009, Isak Lindenauer, a poet, writer, Castro business-owner and resident since the 1980s, had a similar vision; then-city Supervisor Bevan Dufty connected the two, so they joined efforts. Lindenauer coined Rainbow Honor Walk; and used a mockup showing the name surrounded by rainbow motif mosaic tiles. Supervisor Bevan Dufty authored city legislation for the project in 2010, although most of the details, including design and scope, had yet to be worked out.

The RHW has been approved to extend from the Harvey Milk Civil Rights Academy at 19th Street & Collingwood, to proceed along Castro Street (the 400 and 500 blocks) to its intersection with Market Street, and follow Market to the San Francisco LGBTQ Community Center at Octavia Boulevard; additionally the RHW will branch out in both directions where 18th Street intersects Castro Street.

In 2009, Perry and other community advocates co-founded the RHW, an all-volunteer, non-profit organization to manage the process of identifying and documenting about twenty honorees each round, and to gain funding for commissioning plaques and their installation. Perry has served as the board chair until stepping down in 2019, although he'll remain as an unpaid consultant to the project. Anyone can nominate potential honorees; the inaugural round had more than 150 people suggested. In 2011 the non-profit announced the inaugural twenty honorees, whose plaques were installed in 2014.

Kathy Amendola, owner of Cruisin’ the Castro Walking Tours, the city's "first and only Legacy Business Tour Company", and the first female RHW board member, noted the diversity of the honorees; and said it was a part of the RHW's mission: to “present multi-sexual, multi-gender and multi-cultural spectrum of human history.” The tour company added routes based on the RHW.

=== RHW board ===
The ten-plus member RHW board of directors oversees all aspects of the project. In addition to selecting the honorees, they direct the planning, fundraising, and execution of producing and placing the permanent bronze plaques. One RHW board member, Benjamin Leong, was already an LGBTQ activist when Perry and Lindenauer recruited him in July 2011, "The project grabbed my interest and attention because it is important to know ones history and this project serves to educate and honor the LGBTQ heroes and heroines of the past and present." (Note: As of August 2019, the RHW board includes: Peter Goss, Madeline Hancock, Karen Helmuth, Ben Leong, Bill Lipsky, board president and founder David Perry, Joseph D. Robinson; attorney and straight ally Charlotte Ruffner whose served since 2013; Donna Sachet, Gustavo Serina, Barbara Tannenbaum, and Tarita Thomas.)

Among the fundraising efforts was a sale of local artist Beth Van Hoesen’s paintings, including those of drag queens she met in the Castro such as The Widow Norton, who's included in the RHW, and The Sisters of Perpetual Indulgence.

=== Design competition for plaques ===
In 2012 the RHW board held a no-fee, international design competition, led by Anthony Turney, for the plaques, three-foot by three-foot in size to match the existing sidewalk. Each plaque will contain: the honoree's name; birth and death dates; their signature, and a brief description of contributions. An LGBTQ historian drafts the likely final text which is also vetted by the GLBT Historical Society.

An independent blind jury of "curators from San Francisco's leading cultural institutions", LGBTQ community leaders, and a representative of San Francisco Arts Commission's (SFAC) Civic Design Committee determined four finalists. Tom DeCaigny, Director of Cultural Affairs for the SFAC, said

"The Rainbow Honor Walk will not only be an inspiring educational tool for future generations, but an important, ongoing and permanent part of San Francisco's cultural landscape."

The RHW board chose a design by architect Carlos Casuso of Madrid, Spain, who was given a $1000 honorarium. The design proposed a bronze plaque cut into quarters, with each honoree's photo "digitally treated so it can be easily engraved in the bronze". The engraved image fills the entirety of the plaque, while "one quarter is reserved for the honoree's biographical information". The contest was overseen, and design reviewed by the SFAC—which must approve all structures built on public property—and the Department of Public Works. The images are acid etched in the bronze plaque which is an inch thick. About a dozen images from the finished inaugural group can be seen on this article.

The finished pieces are treated with a slip-resistant coating, which is also protective from shoe scuffing, and the plaques are bolted to the concrete. The protective coating is re-applied every five years. The city administers ongoing maintenance in partnership with the RHW, while insurance costs are built into the fundraising for each round of plaques. Additionally the "composition, make, and design of the plaques have been carefully evaluated to ensure endurance and durability"; plus they are extremely heavy so theft would entail industrial equipment.

Mussi Artworks Foundry, a foundry in Berkeley, California, manufactures the plaques. The process was overseen by Lawrence Noble, head of the sculpture department at SF Academy of Art University. The initial per-plaque cost was around $5,600 including production and insurance; for the second round the cost is about $7000 each.

=== Inaugural round of honorees (2014) ===
The inaugural round of twenty honorees includes: Jane Addams, James Baldwin, George Choy, Federico Garcia Lorca, Allen Ginsberg, Keith Haring, Harry Hay, Christine Jorgensen, Frida Kahlo, Del Martin, Yukio Mishima (née Kimitake Hiraoka), Bayard Rustin, Randy Shilts, Gertrude Stein, Sylvester, Alan Turing, Tom Waddell, Oscar Wilde, Tennessee Williams, and Virginia Woolf. Co-founder David Perry noted at the time,

"...it's not just educating about the past. It's educating about the present and the future. We still do not have equal rights.

A conscious decision to not include Harvey Milk in the inaugural round was made as he already had a handful of places named after him; (Note: The Harvey Milk Recreational Arts Center is headquarters for the drama and performing arts programs for the city's youth. Douglass Elementary in the Castro District was renamed the Harvey Milk Civil Rights Academy in 1996; and the Eureka Valley Branch of the San Francisco Public Library was renamed in his honor in 1981. It is located at 1 José Sarria Court, named for the first openly gay man to run for public office in the United States. On what would have been Milk's 78th birthday, a bust of his likeness was unveiled in San Francisco City Hall at the top of the grand staircase. On June 2, 2008, a bust of Harvey Milk was accepted into the Civic Art Collection during a meeting of the Full Commission. Designed by the Eugene Daub, Firmin, Hendrickson Sculpture Group with Eugene Daub the principal sculptor. The work was unveiled during a gala party at San Francisco's City Hall on May 22, 2008, what would have been Milk's 78th birthday. Engraved in the pedestal is a quotation from one of the audiotapes Milk recorded in the event of his assassination, which he openly predicted several times before his death. "I ask for the movement to continue because my election gave young people out there hope. You gotta give 'em hope.") as well as two historical markers outside his old camera shop on Castro Street.

The installation was coordinated to be a part of the Castro Street Streetscape Project, an extensive $10 million reimagining of Castro Street's 400 and 500 blocks: including the intersection with 18th Street; and improvements to Jane Warner Plaza at Castro and 17th streets, the F Market & Wharves outbound terminus of the heritage streetcars. The light-posts were updated with rainbow lighting, street-friendly trees— Ginkgos and King Palms—installed, sidewalk ‘throughways’ widened, rainbow crosswalks installed, and walks and streets repaved.

=== Inaugural dedication ===
The plaques were unveiled September 2, 2014, and feature twenty "civil rights activists, writers, poets, artists, and musicians". The opening ceremony took place at Harvey Milk Plaza, at the intersection of Castro and Market streets, with remarks from Perry and LGBTQ politicians. Openly gay California Senator Mark Leno (D-San Francisco) said, "not unlike slaves, [our communities] have been denied our heroes and our history." He added, "People who have changed the history of the course of our planet come from our community."

The inaugural plaques were installed in alphabetical order starting at the plaza: following Castro to 19th Street; 19th to Collingwood Street; and then on the other side of the street returning. The dedication proceeded to each plaque where LGBTQ leaders and RHW board members unveiled them in a cascading ceremony.

The non-profit raised $100,000–$112,000 for the first round of plaques. They each cost approximately $5,600–$6,000. The funds came from private sources. Two Indiegogo online fundraisers for Sylvester, and Alan Turing each raised $10,000. Additionally, thousands were raised by the sale of souvenirs at the Castro outlet of the Human Rights Campaign's Action Center.

Two of the installed plaques were later seen to have typos: Oscar Wilde's said he had a "bitting wit" rather than "biting wit"; and Christine Jorgensen's spelled transgender without the "s”. They were replaced by the manufacturer and both plaques with errors were to be auctioned: Wilde's to raise funds for the RHW; Jorgensen's to benefit the Transgender Law Center. They were replaced a month later; free of any costs.

=== Second round of honorees (2016–2022) ===
There were 170 people nominated for the second round of honorees. In June 2016, the second round of honorees, twenty-four total, was announced including: Alvin Ailey, W. H. Auden, Josephine Baker, Gladys Bentley, Glenn Burke, Quentin Crisp, Divine, Marie Equi, Fereydoun Farrokhzad, Barbara Jordan, Kiyoshi Kuromiya, Audre Lorde, Leonard Matlovich, Freddie Mercury, Sally Ride, Sylvia Rivera, Vito Russo, José Sarria, Maurice Sendak, Rikki Streicher, Gerry Studds, Lou Sullivan, Chavela Vargas, and We'wha. These plaques were estimated to total $120,000. Their estimated cost per plaque was around $7000 each.

The first eight plaques of this round were unveiled in June 2018; and installed, on both sides of Market Street between Castro and Noe streets, in November of that year. On the north side of Market Street are the plaques for Fereydoun Farakzah, Barbara Jordan, Kiyoshi Kuromiya, and Sally Ride. On the south side is Glenn Burke, Jose Sarria, Rikki Streicher, and We'Wha. These cost $48,437, while the project has $31,000 raised for the next plaques.

The second eight's designs were unveiled at a June 2019 Pride month RHW fundraiser at Google which raised over $3300. The plaques themselves were installed in August 2019 on Market Street between Castro and Noe streets including: Chavela Vargas, Marie Equi; Josephine Baker, Freddie Mercury; Alvin Ailey, W.H. Auden, Gerry Studds, and Lou Sullivan.

The third group of this round includes: Gladys Bentley, Audre Lorde, Divine, Sylvia Rivera, Leonard Matlovich, Vito Russo, Quentin Crisp, and Maurice Sendak. The plaques were installed in 2022 on Market Street between 16th and 15th streets as part of the Upper Market Street Safety Project.

=== New honorees (2022) ===
In 2022, 24 new honorees were named:

Peter Adair, Gloria Anzaldúa, Gilbert Baker, Tullalah Bankhead, Bernice Bing, Bobbi Campbell, Esther Eng, Leslie Feinberg, Lorraine Hansberry, Magnus Hirschfeld, Billie Holiday, Langston Hughes, Carlos Jáuregui, Marsha P. Johnson, Larry Kramer, Phyllis Lyon, Xulhaz Mannan, Marlon Riggs, Bob Ross (publisher), Charley Parkhurst, Oliver Sacks, Jon Reed Sims, Edith Windsor, SOPHIE (Sophie Xeon).

In 2025, the plaques for Phyllis Lyon and Charley Parkhurst are slated for installation, with the remaining 22 to be installed in 2026.

== Honorees ==
=== A ===
- Jane Addams was a pioneering lesbian who is recognized as the founder of the field of social work in the United States. She was an American settlement activist, reformer, social worker, sociologist, public administrator, and author. She was also a notable figure in women's suffrage in the United States and an advocate for world peace. She co-founded Chicago's Hull House, one of America's most notable settlement houses. In 1920, she co-founded the ACLU. In 1931, Addams was the first American woman to be awarded the Nobel Peace Prize. She is increasingly being recognized as a member of the American pragmatist school of philosophy, and is known by many as the first woman "public philosopher in the history of the United States". Addams is among the inaugural twenty honored in 2014.
- Alvin Ailey was an African-American dancer, director, choreographer, and activist who founded the Alvin Ailey American Dance Theater, one of the most successful dance companies in the world. He created AAADT and its affiliated Ailey School as havens for nurturing black artists and expressing the universality of the African-American experience through dance. His work fused theatre, modern dance, ballet, and jazz with black vernacular, creating hope-fueled choreography that continues to spread global awareness of black life in America. Ailey's choreographic masterpiece Revelations is recognized as one of the most popular and most performed ballets in the world. On July 15, 2008, the United States Congress passed a resolution designating AAADT a "vital American Cultural Ambassador to the World." That same year, in recognition of AAADT's 50th anniversary, then Mayor Michael Bloomberg declared December 4 "Alvin Ailey Day" in New York City while then Governor David Paterson honoured the organization on behalf of New York State. Though Ailey was gay, he kept his romantic affairs in the closet. Following the death of his friend Joyce Trisler, a failed relationship, and bouts of heavy drinking and cocaine use, he suffered a mental breakdown in 1980. He was diagnosed as manic depressive, known today as bi-polar disorder. Ailey was in the second group among the second round of honorees installed in August 2019 on Market Street between Castro and Noe streets.
- W. H. Auden was an English-American poet whose work was noted for its stylistic and technical achievement, its engagement with politics, morals, love, and religion, and its variety in tone, form and content. He is best known for love poems such as "Funeral Blues"; poems on political and social themes such as "September 1, 1939" and "The Shield of Achilles"; poems on cultural and psychological themes such as The Age of Anxiety; and poems on religious themes such as "For the Time Being" and "Horae Canonicae". After a few months in Berlin in 1928–29, he spent five years (1930–35) teaching in British public schools, then travelled to Iceland and China to write books about his journeys. In 1939 he moved to the U.S. becoming an American citizen in 1946. He taught from 1941 to 1945 in American universities, followed by occasional visiting professorships in the 1950s. He came to wide public attention with his first book Poems at the age of twenty-three in 1930; it was followed in 1932 by The Orators. Three plays written in collaboration with Christopher Isherwood between 1935 and 1938 built his reputation as a left-wing political writer. He won the Pulitzer Prize for Poetry for his 1947 long poem The Age of Anxiety, the title of which became a popular phrase describing the modern era. From 1956 to 1961 he was Professor of Poetry at Oxford; his lectures were popular with students and faculty, and served as the basis for his 1962 prose collection The Dyer's Hand. Auden and Isherwood maintained a lasting but intermittent sexual friendship from around 1927 to 1939, while both had briefer but more intense relations with other men. In 1939, Auden fell in love with Chester Kallman and regarded their relationship as a marriage, but this ended in 1941 when Kallman refused to accept the faithful relations that Auden demanded. They also collaborated on opera libretti such as that of The Rake's Progress, to music by Igor Stravinsky. After his death, his poems became known to a much wider public than during his lifetime through films, broadcasts, and popular media. Auden was in the second group among the second round of honorees installed in August 2019 on Market Street between Castro and Noe streets.

=== B ===
- Josephine Baker was a bisexual American-born French entertainer, activist, and French Resistance agent. Her career was centered primarily in Europe, mostly in her adopted France. During her early career she was renowned as a dancer, and was among the most celebrated performers to headline the revues of the Folies Bergère in Paris. Her performance in the revue Un vent de folie in 1927 caused a sensation in Paris. Her costume, consisting of only a girdle of artificial bananas, became her most iconic image and a symbol of the Jazz Age and the 1920s. Baker was celebrated by artists and intellectuals of the era, who variously dubbed her the "Black Venus", the "Black Pearl", the "Bronze Venus", and the "Creole Goddess". Baker was the first African-American to star in a major motion picture, the 1927 silent film Siren of the Tropics, directed by Mario Nalpas and Henri Étiévant. Baker refused to perform for segregated audiences in the U.S. and is noted for her contributions to the Civil Rights Movement. In 1968 she was offered unofficial leadership in the movement in the United States by Coretta Scott King, following Martin Luther King Jr.'s assassination. After thinking it over, Baker declined the offer out of concern for the welfare of her children. She was also known for aiding the French Resistance during World War II. After the war, she was awarded the Croix de guerre by the French military, and was named a Chevalier of the Légion d'honneur by General Charles de Gaulle. Baker was bisexual. While she had four marriages to men, Jean-Claude Baker writes that Josephine also had several relationships with women. Baker was in the second group among the second round of honorees installed in August 2019 on Market Street between Castro and Noe streets.
- James Baldwin was a gay African-American novelist, playwright, and activist. His essays, as collected in Notes of a Native Son (1955), explore intricacies of racial, sexual, and class distinctions in Western societies, most notably in mid-20th-century North America. Some of Baldwin's essays are book-length, including The Fire Next Time (1963), No Name in the Street (1972), and The Devil Finds Work (1976). An unfinished manuscript, Remember This House, was expanded and adapted for cinema as the documentary film I Am Not Your Negro (2017), which featured historic footage of Baldwin and was nominated for an Academy Award. One of his novels, If Beale Street Could Talk, was adapted as a dramatic film of the same name, released in 2018, which won an Academy Award. Baldwin's novels and plays explore fundamental personal questions and dilemmas amid the complex social and psychological pressures that thwart the equitable integration of not only African Americans, but also gay and bisexual men. He also depicts some internalized obstacles to such individuals' quests for acceptance. Such dynamics are prominent in Baldwin's second novel, Giovanni's Room (1956), published well before the gay liberation movement of the later twentieth century. He is among the inaugural twenty honored in 2014.
- Glenn Burke was a Major League Baseball (MLB) player for the Los Angeles Dodgers and Oakland Athletics from 1976 to 1979. He was the first MLB player to come out as gay to teammates and team owners during his professional career and the first to publicly acknowledge it, stating, "They can't ever say now that a gay man can't play in the majors, because I'm a gay man and I made it." In October 1977, Burke ran onto the field to congratulate his Dodgers teammate Dusty Baker after Baker hit his 30th home run; Burke raised his hand over his head and Baker slapped it. They are widely credited with inventing the high five. Burke kept active in sports after retiring from baseball. He competed in the 1982 Gay Olympics, now renamed Gay Games, in track, and in 1986 in basketball. He played for many years in the San Francisco Gay Softball League. He died from AIDS-related causes in 1995. In August 2013, Burke was among the first class of inductees into the National Gay and Lesbian Sports Hall of Fame. Burke was inducted into the Baseball Reliquary's Shrine of the Eternals in 2015. His plaque was installed on Market Street between Castro and Noe streets, in November 2018.

=== C ===
- George Choy was a gay Asian-American LGBTQ and HIV/AIDS activist who fought for human rights for LGBTQ Asian and Pacific Islanders. He grew up in San Francisco's Chinatown, where he witnessed the minority's struggles for rights. He "came out" after high school and became an early member of San Francisco's Gay Asian Pacific Alliance. In the spring of 1990, Choy led GAPA's Project 10 effort to get approval for paid counseling for San Francisco's LGBTQ public school students; despite the claims that no Asian queer people existed, it passed. The next year he was GAPA's point person assisting a lawsuit against the city government of Tokyo, Japan, to gain approval for a queer group, OCCUR, to use its youth center. He organized supporting activities in both San Francisco and Tokyo, and also in Osaka. Choy was a health worker and an activist with both GAPA and ACT-UP. He is among the inaugural twenty honored in 2014.

=== E ===
- Marie Equi was an early American medical doctor in the American West devoted to providing care to working-class and poor patients. She regularly provided birth control information and abortions at a time when both were illegal. She became a political activist and advocated civic and economic reforms, including women's right to vote and an eight-hour workday. After being clubbed by a policeman in a 1913 workers' strike, Equi aligned herself with anarchists and the radical labor movement. Equi was a lesbian who maintained a primary relationship with Harriet Frances Speckart (1883 – May 15, 1927) for more than a decade. The two women adopted an infant and raised the child in an early example, for the United States, of a same-sex alternative family. For her radical politics and same-sex relations, Equi battled discrimination and harassment. In 1918, Equi was convicted under the Sedition Act for speaking against U.S. involvement in World War I. She was sentenced to a three-year term at San Quentin State Prison. She was the only known lesbian and radical to be incarcerated at the prison. Equi was in the second group among the second round of honorees installed in August 2019 on Market Street between Castro and Noe streets.

=== F ===
- Fereydoun Farrokhzad was a gay Iranian singer, actor, poet, TV and radio host, writer, and political opposition figure. He is best known for his variety TV show "Mikhak-e Noghrei" (The Silver Carnation). He was the brother of the acclaimed Persian poets Forough Farrokhzad and Pooran Farrokhzad. Farrokhzad was forced into exile after the Islamic Revolution in 1979, and after relocating to Germany was the victim of an unsolved murder. The murder is widely believed to be the work of the Islamic Republic government of Iran, as part of the chain murders in 1988–98. Farrokhzad remains a significant Iranian cultural icon whose popular music and television programs continue to be circulated through various media platforms. His murder—possibly, a political assassination of a celebrity activist entertainer—is a well known and oft-cited event amongst Iranians. His plaque was installed on Market Street between Castro and Noe streets, in November 2018.

=== G ===
- Federico García Lorca was a gay Spanish poet, playwright, and theatre director. García Lorca achieved international recognition as an emblematic member of the Generation of '27, a group consisting mostly of poets, who introduced the tenets of European movements (such as symbolism, futurism, and surrealism) into Spanish literature. He was executed by Nationalist forces at the beginning of the Spanish Civil War. He is among the inaugural twenty honored in 2014.
- Allen Ginsberg was a gay American poet, philosopher and writer. He is considered to be one of the leading figures of both the Beat Generation during the 1950s and the counterculture of the following decade. He vigorously opposed militarism, economic materialism, and sexual repression, and was known to embody various aspects of this counterculture, such as his views on drugs, hostility to bureaucracy, and openness to Eastern religions. He was one of many influential American writers of his time who were associated with the Beat Generation. He is best known for his poem "Howl", in which he denounced what he saw as the destructive forces of capitalism and conformity in the United States. In 1957, his poem attracted widespread publicity as the subject of an obscenity trial; it described homosexual sex at a time when sodomy laws made homosexual acts a crime in every U.S. state. "Howl" reflected Ginsberg's own sexuality and his relationships with a number of men, including Peter Orlovsky, his lifelong partner. Ginsberg took part in decades of non-violent political protest against the Vietnam War and the war on drugs. His collection The Fall of America was one of two books honored in 1974 by the annual U.S. National Book Award for Poetry. In 1979, he received the National Arts Club gold medal and was inducted into the American Academy and Institute of Arts and Letters. Ginsberg was a Pulitzer Prize finalist in 1995 for his book Cosmopolitan Greetings: Poems 1986–1992. He is among the inaugural twenty honored in 2014.

=== H ===
- Keith Haring was a gay American pop artist whose graffiti-like work developed from the New York City street culture of the 1980s: he addressed political and social themes—especially homosexuality and AIDS—through his own iconography and sexual allusions. He is among the inaugural twenty honored in 2014.
- Harry Hay was a gay American who was involved in some of the earliest gay rights organizations, including the Mattachine Society, the first sustained gay rights group in the United States. In addition, he co-founded the Radical Faeries, an international, loosely affiliated gay spiritual movement. He is among the inaugural twenty honored in 2014.

=== J ===
- Barbara Jordan was a lesbian lawyer, educator, and politician who was a leader of the Civil Rights Movement. A Democrat, she was the first African American elected to the Texas Senate after Reconstruction and the first Southern African-American woman elected to the U.S. House of Representatives. She was best known for her eloquent opening statement at the House Judiciary Committee hearings during the impeachment process against Richard Nixon, and as the first African-American as well as the first woman to deliver a keynote address at a Democratic National Convention. She received the Presidential Medal of Freedom, among numerous other honors. She was a member of the Peabody Awards Board of Jurors from 1978 to 1980. She was the first African-American woman to be buried in the Texas State Cemetery. Her plaque was installed on Market Street between Castro and Noe streets, in November 2018.
- Christine Jorgensen was an American transsexual who was the first person to become widely known in the U.S. for having sex reassignment surgery in her twenties. Jorgensen grew up in the Bronx, New York City. Shortly after graduating from high school in 1945, she was drafted as a male into the U.S. Army for World War II. After her service, she attended several schools, and worked. Around this time she heard about sex reassignment surgery. She traveled to Europe. In Copenhagen, Denmark, she obtained special permission to undergo a series of operations for reassignment, starting in 1951. She returned to the United States in the early 1950s, where her transition was the subject of a New York Daily News front-page story. Jorgenson became an instant celebrity, and used this platform to advocate for transgender people; she became known for her directness and polished wit. She worked as an actress and nightclub entertainer, and recorded several songs. She is among the inaugural twenty honored in 2014. (Her plaque had a typo and was replaced at no cost to the project. The original was auctioned off with the proceeds donated to the Transgender Law Center.)

=== K ===
- Frida Kahlo was a bisexual Mexican artist. She was a painter known for her many portraits, self-portraits, and works inspired by the nature and artifacts of Mexico. Inspired by the country's popular culture, she used a naïve folk art style to explore questions of identity, postcolonialism, gender, class, and race in Mexican society. In addition to belonging to the post-revolutionary Mexicayotl movement, which sought to define a Mexican identity, Kahlo has been described as a surrealist or magical realist. By the early 1990s, she was a recognized figure in art history, and was also regarded as an icon for Chicanos, the feminism movement, and the LGBTQ movement. Kahlo's work has been celebrated internationally as emblematic of Mexican national and indigenous traditions, and by feminists for its uncompromising depiction of the female experience and form. She is among the inaugural twenty honored in 2014.
- Kiyoshi Kuromiya was a gay Japanese-American activist in the civil rights, anti-war, gay, and AIDS movements. He was a co-founder of Gay Liberation Front- Philadelphia, an openly gay delegate to the Black Panther Convention, an assistant of Martin Luther King Jr., direct action activist with ACT UP, and People With AIDS (PWA), founder of the Critical Path Project, and the leading plaintiff in the Supreme Court case, Kuromiya vs. The United States of America, calling for the legalization of marijuana for medical uses. His plaque was installed on Market Street between Castro and Noe streets, in November 2018.

=== M ===
- Del Martin was a lesbian American feminist and gay-rights activist who, along with her wife Phyllis Ann Lyon, founded the Daughters of Bilitis (DOB) in 1955. DOB was the first social and political organization for lesbians in the U.S. The couple served as president and editor of the organization's magazine, The Ladder. The couple joined the National Organization for Women(NOW) together, the first openly lesbian couple to do so. They were the first couple married in the historic San Francisco 2004 same-sex weddings. As these weddings were ruled legally invalid, they were the first couple married again in June 2008, after the California Supreme Court's decision In re Marriage Cases. Martin is among the inaugural twenty honored in 2014.
- Freddie Mercury was a bisexual British singer, songwriter, record producer, and lead vocalist of the rock band Queen. Regarded as one of the greatest lead singers in the history of rock music, he was known for his flamboyant stage persona and four-octave vocal range. Mercury wrote numerous hits for Queen, including "Killer Queen", "Bohemian Rhapsody", "Somebody to Love", "We Are the Champions", "Don't Stop Me Now", and "Crazy Little Thing Called Love". He also led a solo career and served as a producer and guest musician for other artists. Mercury died in 1991 at age 45 due to complications from AIDS. In 1992, a tribute concert was held at Wembley Stadium. As a member of Queen, Mercury was posthumously inducted into the Rock and Roll Hall of Fame in 2001, the Songwriters Hall of Fame in 2003, and the UK Music Hall of Fame in 2004. In 1990, he and the other Queen members were awarded the Brit Award for Outstanding Contribution to British Music, and one year after his death Mercury was awarded it individually. In 2005, Queen were awarded an Ivor Novello Award for Outstanding Song Collection from the British Academy of Songwriters, Composers, and Authors. In 2002, Mercury ranked number 58 in the BBC's poll of the 100 Greatest Britons. Mercury was in the second group among the second round of honorees installed in August 2019 on Market Street between Castro and Noe streets.
- Harvey Milk was a gay American activist who was the first openly-gay elected official in California, where he was elected to the San Francisco Board of Supervisors. He was the most pro-LGBTQ politician in the United States at the time. Milk and Mayor George Moscone were assassinated in city hall; the White Night riots broke out in protest. Despite his short career in politics, Milk became an icon in the city and a martyr of the gay community. (Note: Milk was described as a martyr by news outlets as early as 1979, by biographer Randy Shilts in 1982, and University of San Francisco professor Peter Novak in 2003.) In 2002, Milk was called "the most famous and most significantly open LGBT official ever elected in the United States". He was posthumously awarded the Presidential Medal of Freedom in 2009. The walk passes in front of Milk's former camera shop, which is now a Human Rights Campaign headquarters. Milk is not technically part of the walk, since he already had an existing sidewalk plaque in front of his former office.
- Yukio Mishima was a gay Japanese author, poet, playwright, actor, model, film director, nationalist, and founder of the Tatenokai. Mishima is considered one of the most important Japanese authors of the 20th century. He was considered for the Nobel Prize in Literature in 1968 A fierce critic of Marxist ideologies and considered anti-Marxist by the Soviet Union's KGB, Mishima formed the Tatenokai. This was an unarmed civilian militia to defend the Japanese Emperor in the event of a revolution by Japanese communists. On November 25, 1970, Mishima and four members of his militia entered a military base in central Tokyo, took the commandant hostage, and attempted to inspire the Japan Self-Defense Forces to overturn Japan's 1947 Constitution. When this was unsuccessful, Mishima committed suicide by seppuku. He is among the inaugural twenty people honored in 2014.

=== R ===
- Sally Ride was a lesbian astronaut and physicist. Born in Los Angeles, she joined NASA in 1978 and became the first American woman in space in 1983. Ride was the third woman in space overall. (Note: after USSR cosmonauts Valentina Tereshkova (1963) and Svetlana Savitskaya (1982).) Ride remains the youngest American astronaut to have traveled to space, having done so at the age of 32. After flying twice on the Orbiter Challenger, she left NASA in 1987. Ride was married 5 years to fellow astronaut Steven Hawley. She worked for two years at Stanford University's Center for International Security and Arms Control, then at the University of California, San Diego as a professor of physics, primarily researching nonlinear optics and Thomson scattering. After her death, her obituary revealed that her partner of 27 years was Tam O'Shaughnessy, a professor emerita of school psychology at San Diego State University and childhood friend, who met her when both were aspiring tennis players. O'Shaughnessy was also a science writer and, later, the co-founder of Sally Ride Science (SRS). O'Shaughnessy served as the CEO and Chair of the Board of SRS. They wrote six acclaimed children's science books together. Their relationship was revealed by the company and confirmed by her sister, who said she chose to keep her personal life private, including her sickness and treatments. She is the first known LGBTQ astronaut. Her plaque was installed on Market Street between Castro and Noe streets, in November 2018.
- Bayard Rustin was a gay, African-American activist and a leader in the Civil Rights Movement in the United States, from the 1940s through the 1980s. He co-organized the 1941 March on Washington Movement to end racial discrimination in housing and employment, and was active as a socialist and in the early movements for gay rights. He later organized the Freedom Riders In the American South, and he was instrumental in the Southern Christian Leadership Conference alongside Martin Luther King Jr., teaching King about nonviolent direct action. Rustin organized the 1963 March on Washington for Jobs and Freedom, considered a turning point in the movement for civil and economic rights for Black Americans. It inspired those working for social justice, worldwide. Due to overt homophobia and discrimination, Rustin often organized behind the scenes, supporting civil rights leaders who were not openly gay. In the 1980s, he became a more public advocate on behalf of gay causes. In November 2013, President Barack Obama posthumously awarded him the Presidential Medal of Freedom, which Rustin's partner, Walter Naegle, accepted on his behalf. Rustin is among the inaugural twenty people honored in 2014.

=== S ===
- José Sarria better known as Absolute Empress I de San Francisco, the Widow Norton was a gay community organizer and political activist who became the first openly gay candidate for public office in the U.S. in 1961. She performed for years as a live-singing drag queen doing parodies of operas at the Black Cat Bar, and declaring herself Empress Norton, founded the Imperial Court System, one of the oldest and largest LGBTQ organizations in the world, with chapters throughout North America. Her plaque was installed on Market Street between Castro and Noe streets, in November 2018.
- Randy Shilts was a gay American literary-journalist and author. A prolific reporter, in 1981, he became "the first openly gay reporter with a gay 'beat' in the American mainstream press" at the San Francisco Chronicle. He published his first book in 1982, The Mayor of Castro Street: The Life and Times of Harvey Milk. His second book, And the Band Played On: Politics, People, and the AIDS Epidemic(1987), documented the early years of the AIDS epidemic in the U.S. His third book, Conduct Unbecoming: Gays and Lesbians in the US Military from Vietnam to the Persian Gulf, was published in 1983. He is among the inaugural twenty honored in 2014.
- Gertrude Stein was a lesbian American novelist, poet, playwright, and art collector. Born in Oakland, she moved to Paris in 1903 as a young woman, and made France her home for the remainder of her life. There she hosted a salon, where the leading figures of modernism in literature and art would meet. In 1933, Stein published a quasi-memoir of her Paris years, The Autobiography of Alice B. Toklas, written in the voice of Alice B. Toklas, her life partner. The book became a literary bestseller and vaulted Stein from the relative obscurity of high modernist literature into the limelight of mainstream attention. Two quotes from her works have become widely known: "Rose is a rose is a rose is a rose", and "there is no there there", with the latter often believed to refer to her childhood home of Oakland, California. Her books include Q.E.D.(1903), about a lesbian romantic affair involving several of Stein's friends; Fernhurst, a novel bout a love triangle; Three Lives (1905–06), and The Making of Americans (1902–1911). In Tender Buttons (1914), Stein explored lesbian sexuality. She is among the inaugural twenty honored in 2014.
- Rikki Streicher was a leader in San Francisco's LGBTQ movement. In the 1960s, she had an active leadership role in the Society for Individual Rights, an organization that promoted equal rights for gays and lesbians. In 1966 she opened and ran Maud's, a year prior to the San Francisco's Summer of Love; it stayed open for 23 years, at that time the longest continuously running lesbian-owned lesbian bar in the country. She opened a second bar, Amelia's, in 1978 in the city's Mission district, with both venues serving as makeshift community centers for lesbians who had very few accepting socializing options. In the early 1980s, she was a co-founder of the international Gay Olympics, later called Gay Games, she helped to create the Federation of Gay Games and served on the board of directors. In 1994, she received the Dr. Tom Waddell Award for her contribution to Gay Athletics. The Rikki Streicher Field, an athletic field and recreation center in San Francisco's Castro District, was named after her. Her plaque was installed on Market Street between Castro and Noe streets, in November 2018.
- Gerry Studds was an American Democratic Congressman from Massachusetts who served from 1973 until 1997. He was the first openly gay member of Congress. In 1983, he was censured by the House of Representatives after he admitted to a consensual relationship with a 17-year-old page. Studds was re-elected to the House six more times after the 1983 censure. He fought for many issues, including environmental and maritime issues, same-sex marriage, AIDS funding, and civil rights, particularly for gays and lesbians. Studds was an outspoken opponent of the Strategic Defense Initiative missile defense system, which he considered wasteful and ineffective, and he criticized the United States government's secretive support for the Contra fighters in Nicaragua. Studds was in the second group among the second round of honorees installed in August 2019 on Market Street between Castro and Noe streets.
- Lou Sullivan was an American author and activist known for his work on behalf of trans men. He was perhaps the first transgender man to publicly identify as gay, and is largely responsible for the modern understanding of sexual orientation and gender identity as distinct, unrelated concepts. Sullivan was a pioneer of the grassroots female-to-male (FTM) movement and was instrumental in helping individuals obtain peer-support, counselling, endocrinological services, and reconstructive surgery outside of gender dysphoria clinics. He founded FTM International, one of the first organizations specifically for FTM individuals, and his activism and community work was a significant contributor to the rapid growth of the FTM community during the late 1980s. Sullivan was in the second group among the second round of honorees installed in August 2019 on Market Street between Castro and Noe streets.
- Sylvester was a gay African-American singer-songwriter, who was primarily active in the genres of disco, rhythm and blues, and soul. He was known for his flamboyant and androgynous appearance, falsetto singing voice, and hit disco singles in the late 1970s and 1980s. Moving to San Francisco in 1970 at the age of 22, Sylvester embraced the counterculture. He joined the avant-garde drag troupe The Cockettes, producing solo segments of their shows that were strongly influenced by such female blues and jazz singers as Billie Holiday and Josephine Baker. With his second solo album Step II (1978), he released the singles "You Make Me Feel (Mighty Real)" and "Dance (Disco Heat)", both of which were hits in the U.S. and Europe. As an openly gay man throughout his career, Sylvester became a spokesman for the gay community. An activist who campaigned against HIV/AIDS, Sylvester died from complications arising from the virus in 1988. He bequeathed all future royalties from his work to San Francisco-based HIV/AIDS charities. During the late 1970s, Sylvester gained the moniker of the "Queen of Disco" and was awarded the key to the city of San Francisco. In 2005, he was posthumously inducted into the Dance Music Hall of Fame. He has been the subject of a biography, film documentary, and a musical. He is among the inaugural twenty honored in 2014; the only musician honored in the first round. (Note: His original plaque had a typo so was replaced at no cost to the project.)

=== T ===
- Alan Turing was a gay British man who was a mathematician, computer scientist, logician, cryptanalyst, philosopher, and theoretical biologist. He was highly influential in the development of theoretical computer science, providing a formalisation of the concepts of algorithm and computation with the Turing machine. This is considered a model of a general-purpose computer. Turing is widely considered to be the father of theoretical computer science and artificial intelligence. During the Second World War, Turing worked for Britain's code-breaking centre that produced Ultra intelligence; it was pivotal in cracking intercepted coded messages that enabled the Allies to defeat the Nazis in many crucial engagements and in so doing helped win the war. (Note: A number of sources state that Winston Churchill said that Turing made the single biggest contribution to Allied victory in the war against Nazi Germany. Both The Churchill Centre and Turing's biographer Andrew Hodges have said they know of no documentary evidence to support this claim, nor of the date or context in which Churchill supposedly said it. The Churchill Centre lists it among their Churchill 'Myths'. A BBC News profile piece that repeated the Churchill claim has been amended to say there is no evidence for it.) After the war, Turing worked at the National Physical Laboratory, where he designed the Automatic Computing Engine, which was one of the first designs for a stored-program computer. In July 2019 the Bank of England announced that Turing would be depicted on the United Kingdom's new £50 note. He is among the inaugural twenty honored in 2014.

=== V ===
- Chavela Vargas was a lesbian Costa Rican-born Mexican singer. She was especially known for her rendition of Mexican rancheras, but she is also recognized for her contribution to other genres of popular Latin American music. She was an influential interpreter in the Americas and Europe, muse to figures such as Pedro Almodóvar, hailed for her haunting performances, and called "la voz áspera de la ternura", the rough voice of tenderness. In her youth, she dressed as a man, smoked cigars, drank heavily, carried a gun, and was known for her characteristic red jorongo, which she donned in performances until old. Vargas sang the canción ranchera, which she performed in her own peculiar style. For years Vargas refused to change the genders in her songs. In "Paloma Negra" ("Black Dove"), Vargas accuses a woman of partying all night long and breaking her heart. The typical ranchera, as represented by José Alfredo Jiménez, was a masculine but emotional song about love and its mishaps, usually mediated by alcohol, since in a macho culture, the display of feelings by men is allowed only to the drunk. At age 81, she publicly came out as a lesbian in her 2002 autobiography Y si quieres saber de mi pasado [And if you want to know about my past]. Vargas debuted at Carnegie Hall in 2003 at age 83 at the behest and promotion of Spanish director Pedro Almodóvar, an admirer and friend. The Latin Academy of Recording Arts & Sciences, presented her with a Latin GRAMMY Statuette in 2007 after receiving a Lifetime Achievement Award on behalf of that organization. She was among the second group in the second round of honorees installed in August 2019 on Market Street between Castro and Noe streets.

=== W ===
- Tom Waddell was a gay American athlete and competitor at the 1968 Summer Olympics in Mexico City, where he placed sixth in the decathlon. He broke five of his own personal records in the ten events. He became a physician. In 1982 he founded the Gay Olympics in San Francisco. The international sporting event was later renamed as the Gay Games after the United States Olympic Committee (USOC) sued Waddell for using the word "Olympic" in the original name. The Gay Games are held every four years. Waddell established his private medical practice in the Castro neighborhood of San Francisco in 1974. As a doctor, he also worked internationally, becoming the team physician for the Saudi Arabian Olympic team at the 1976 Montreal Olympics. In the 1980s, Waddell was employed at the City Clinic in San Francisco's Civic Center area. After his death, it was renamed for him. He was among the inaugural twenty people honored in 2014.
- We'wha was a Zuni Native American from New Mexico, and the most famous lhamana on record. In traditional Zuni culture, the lhamana are assigned-male-at-birth people who take on the social and ceremonial roles usually performed by cis women in their culture. They wear a mixture of women's and men's clothing and much of their work is in the areas usually occupied by Zuni women. They are also known to serve as mediators. Some contemporary lhamana participate in the pan-Indian two-spirit community. In 1886, We'wha was part of the Zuni delegation to Washington D.C., and hosted by anthropologist Matilda Coxe Stevenson, during that visit, We'wha met President Grover Cleveland. While We'wha is historically known mainly as a lhamana, We'wha was also a prominent cultural ambassador for Native Americans in general, and the Zuni in particular. During this era, We'wha came in contact with many European-American settlers, teachers, soldiers, missionaries, and anthropologists. In particular, We'wha's friendship with Matilda Coxe Stevenson would lead to much material on the Zuni being published. Stevenson wrote down her observations of We'wha, such as, "She performs masculine religious and judicial functions at the same time that she performs feminine duties, tending to laundry and the garden." Her plaque was installed on Market Street between Castro and Noe streets, in November 2018.
- Oscar Wilde was a gay Anglo-Irish poet and playwright best remembered for his epigrams and plays, his novel The Picture of Dorian Gray, and the circumstances of imprisonment for homosexuality in England. He became known for his involvement in the rising philosophy of aestheticism. As a spokesman for aestheticism, he published a book of poems, and lectured in the United States and Canada on the new "English Renaissance in Art" and interior decoration. After his return to London, he published prolifically as a journalist. Known for his biting wit, flamboyant dress and glittering conversational skill, Wilde became one of the best-known public figures of his day. At the turn of the 1890s, he refined his ideas about the supremacy of art in a series of dialogues and essays, and incorporated themes of decadence, duplicity, and beauty into what would be his only novel, The Picture of Dorian Gray (1890). Wilde wrote and produced four society comedies in the early 1890s, becoming one of the most successful playwrights of late-Victorian London. He is among the inaugural twenty honored in 2014. (Note: Wilde's original plaque had a typo noting his "biting" humor as "bitting"; the plaque was replaced by the manufacturer with the original auctioned off to raise more funds for the project.)
- Tennessee Williams was a gay American playwright considered among the foremost three of 20th-century American drama. (Note: Along with contemporaries Eugene O'Neill and Arthur Miller,) After years of obscurity, at age 33 he became famous with the success of his The Glass Menagerie (1944) on Broadway. He drew from his own family background for this play. It was the first of a string of successes, including A Streetcar Named Desire (1947), Cat on a Hot Tin Roof (1955), Sweet Bird of Youth (1959), and The Night of the Iguana (1961). Streetcar is often numbered on short lists of the finest American plays of the 20th century. Much of his work has been adapted for the cinema. In 1979, Williams was inducted into the American Theater Hall of Fame. He is among the inaugural twenty honored in 2014.
- Virginia Woolf was a bisexual English writer, considered one of the most important modernist 20th-century authors and a pioneer in the use of stream of consciousness as a narrative device. Throughout her life, Woolf was troubled by mental illness, believed to have been bipolar disorder, for which there was no effective intervention during her lifetime. She married Leonard Woolf, with whom she set up a small printing press. She also had a sexual relationship with "the lovely gifted aristocratic Vita Sackville-West", a writer and gardener. The relationship reached its peak between 1925 and 1928, evolving into more of a friendship through the 1930s. Woolf was also inclined to brag of her affairs with other women within her intimate circle, such as Sibyl Colefax and Comtesse de Polignac. Sackville-West transformed Wolf's view to see her writing as healing her symptoms. Her best-known works include the novels Mrs Dalloway (1925), To the Lighthouse (1927), and Orlando (1928), which features a gender-shifting protagonist. She is also known for her essays, including A Room of One's Own (1929), in which she wrote the much-quoted dictum, "A woman must have money and a room of her own if she is to write fiction." Woolf became one of the central subjects of the 1970s movement of feminist criticism, and her works have garnered much attention and widespread commentary for "inspiring feminism." She is among the inaugural twenty honored in 2014.

== Castro Street History Walk ==
A separate sidewalk installation, the Castro Street History Walk (CSHW), is a series of twenty historical fact plaques about the neighborhood—ten from pre-1776 to the 1960s before the Castro became known as a gay neighborhood, and ten "significant events associated with the queer community in the Castro"—contained within the 400 and 500 blocks of the street between 19th and Market streets. They were installed at the same time as the inaugural twenty RHW plaques. The CSHW goes in chronological order starting at Harvey Milk Plaza at Market Street, up to 19th Street, and returning on the opposite side of Castro Street. The $10,000 CSHW was paid for by the Castro Business District (CBD) which "convened a group of local residents and historians to work with Nicholas Perry, a planner and urban designer at the San Francisco Planning Department who worked on the sidewalk-widening project and lives in the Castro" to develop the facts. Each fact was required to be about the neighborhood or the surrounding Eureka Valley. The facts are limited to 230 characters, and were installed in pairs along with a single graphic reminiscent of the historic Castro Theater.

== Sources ==
- Beavers, Anthony (2013). "Alan Turing: Mathematical Mechanist". In Cooper, S. Barry; van Leeuwen, Jan (eds.). Alan Turing: His Work and Impact. Waltham: Elsevier. pp. 481–485. ISBN 978-0-12-386980-7.
- Blackmer, Corrine E (1995), "Gertrude Stein", in Claude J. Summers (ed.), The Gay and Lesbian Literary Heritage, ISBN 978-0-8050-5009-7
- Boynton, Victoria; Malin, Jo, eds. (2005). Encyclopedia of Women's Autobiography: Volume 2 K-Z. Greenwood Press. ISBN 978-0-313-32739-1.
- Barrett, Eileen; Cramer, Patricia, eds. (1997). Virginia Woolf: Lesbian Readings. NYU Press. ISBN 978-0-8147-1263-4.
- Cramer, Patricia (July 1997). Lesbian readings of Woolf's novels: Introduction. pp. 117–127. ISBN 9780814712641.
- Gamson, Joshua (2005). The Fabulous Sylvester: The Legend, the Music, the 70s in San Francisco. New York City: Henry Holt and Co. ISBN 978-0-312-42569-2.
- Garnett, Angelica (2011) [1985]. Deceived With Kindness. Random House. ISBN 978-1-4464-7525-6.
- Miles, Barry, 1943- (2000). Ginsberg : a biography (Rev. ed.). London: Virgin. ISBN 0753504863. OCLC 46809299.
- Shilts, Randy (1982). The Mayor of Castro Street: The Life & Times of Harvey Milk (First ed.). New York. ISBN 0312523300. OCLC 7948538.
- Sipser, Michael (2006). Introduction to the Theory of Computation. PWS Publishing. ISBN 978-0-534-95097-2.
- Todd, Pamela (2001). Bloomsbury at Home. Pavilion. ISBN 978-1-86205-428-8.
- Woolf, Virginia (1977–1984). Bell, Anne Oliver (ed.). The Diary of Virginia Woolf 5 vols. Houghton Mifflin.
  - — (1979). The Diary of Virginia Woolf Volume One 1915–1919. ISBN 978-0-544-31037-7.
  - — (1981). The Diary of Virginia Woolf Volume Two 1920–1924. ISBN 978-0-14-005283-1.
  - — (1978). The Diary of Virginia Woolf Volume Three 1925–1930. ISBN 9780151255993.
  - — (1985). The Diary of Virginia Woolf Volume Five 1936–1941. Houghton Mifflin Harcourt. ISBN 978-0-15-626040-4.
