= Gay Power, Gay Politics =

- CBS Reports episode
- Directed by: Grace Diekhaus; George Crile
- Written by: Grace Diekhaus; George Crile
- Presented by: Harry Reasoner
- Cinematography by: Greg Cooke; Stephen Lighthill
- Editing by: Jane R. Kessler
- Original air date: April 26, 1980

"Gay Power, Gay Politics" is a 1980 episode of the American documentary television series CBS Reports. It was anchored by Harry Reasoner with reportage by George Crile. Crile also produced the episode with co-producer Grace Diekhaus. He conceived the show after becoming aware of the 1979 National March on Washington for Lesbian and Gay Rights and took as his focus the 1979 San Francisco mayoral election. After intermittent shooting over several months in 1979 with the cooperation of prominent members of the city's LGBT community, CBS aired "Gay Power, Gay Politics" on April 26, 1980.

Although described by CBS as a report on the growing influence of the LGBT community in San Francisco politics, "Gay Power, Gay Politics" focused largely on the supposed sexual practices of the gay male community, especially sadomasochism. The documentary sparked outrage in the city and CBS was roundly criticized for its journalistic tactics. The National News Council, a media watchdog organization, found that CBS had violated journalistic standards through misrepresentation purposely to reinforce stereotypes and through deceptive editing.

"Gay Power, Gay Politics" was used as a tool of the religious right to block or repeal anti-discrimination ordinances. LGBT writers and theorists have continued to criticize the documentary.

== Production ==
George Crile became interested in making "Gay Power, Gay Politics" after learning of the National March on Washington for Lesbian and Gay Rights scheduled for October 1979. Crile had earlier produced a piece on assassinated San Francisco Supervisor Harvey Milk that ran on the program CBS Magazine. For this new program, he intended to focus on the 1979 San Francisco mayoral election and the political strength of the gay voting bloc in the city, which the several candidates were courting. He brought Grace Diekhaus in to co-produce with him and secured approval from CBS.

Filming began in the summer of 1979 and continued periodically through November, with the production team shooting in several intervals for a few days each. A number of prominent gay activists, including Armistead Maupin, Cleve Jones and Sally Gearhart, assisted Crile and Diekhaus with the project, although Gearhart and fellow activist Del Martin began questioning their motives, coming to believe the network "was out to do a hatchet job". Crile interviewed Gearhart for the piece but by the date of her interview she was so mistrustful of the producers that she took measures to try to prevent herself from being misrepresented. "I would lift my voice at a certain point so what I said could not be cut. He seemed to want me to vilify Diane (sic) Feinstein in some way and set her in opposition to the gay community....During one of the breaks I told him that I didn't feel good about it...I felt I had been twisted and manipulated." Ultimately Gearhart's interview was cut entirely, for which she was "ecstatic". When Crile began his interview with then-Mayor Dianne Feinstein by asking "How does it feel to be the mayor of Sodom and Gomorrah?" Feinstein threw him and his crew out of her office.

== Overview ==
Anchor Harry Reasoner opened the hour with the following narration, over shots of the 1979 March on Washington:

For someone of my generation, it sounds a bit preposterous. Political power for homosexuals? But those predictions are already coming true. In this report, we'll see how the gays of San Francisco are using the political process to further their own special interest, just like every other minority group before them. Gay power, gay politics, that's what this report is about. It's not a story about life-styles or the average gay experience. What we'll see is the birth of a political movement and the troubling questions it raises for the eighties, not only for San Francisco, but for other cities throughout the country.

Crile's report, rather than exploring the thesis laid out by Reasoner, instead focused in large measure on sexual activity, including men cruising in Buena Vista Park and interviews with so-called sadomasochism consultants. He reported that one out of every ten deaths in San Francisco was attributable to gay men participating in BDSM and that one gay-oriented BDSM establishment's clientele engaged in sexual activity "so dangerous that they have a gynecological table there with a doctor and nurse on hand to sew people up." He compared San Francisco to the Weimar Republic, asking Cleve Jones, "Isn't it a sign of decadence when you have so many gays emerging, breaking apart all the values of a society?" Crile also included footage of Feinstein, in the midst of a run-off election to retain her mayorship, appearing before the Harvey Milk Democratic Club, an LGBT Democratic organization. The program as aired showed Feinstein apologizing for remarks she had made in an earlier Ladies' Home Journal interview, followed immediately by applause.

Following footage of Jones at a candlelight vigil for Harvey Milk and additional footage from the March on Washington, Reasoner closed with:

Gay political organizations are acting all across the country. The right of homosexuals to organize like any other minority seeking to further its own interests is no longer in question. The question is, what will those interests be? Will they include a demand for absolute sexual freedom, as they did in San Francisco? And if so, will this challenge to traditional values provoke far more hostility and controversy when it is put to the test elsewhere? It is no longer a matter of whether homosexuals will achieve political power, but what they will attempt to do with it.

== Criticism ==
=== Representation of the gay community and journalistic standards ===
Crile and CBS were sharply criticized for the reporting and editing practices used in the documentary. A gay journalist named Randy Alfred, who had covered many of the same campaign events that were included in the episode, spent some 300 hours researching what he believed to be factual errors and misrepresentations within the broadcast. By July 10 he had prepared a 20-page complaint outlining 44 alleged instances of misrepresentation which he filed with the National News Council, a media watchdog organization. "Gay Power, Gay Politics", Alfred said, relied on "a systematic use of hearsay, oversights, exaggerations, distortions, inflammatory buzzwords, leading questions, and misleading and deceitful editing" that had as its result "patterned distortion". Of particular note was the scene of Feinstein at the Harvey Milk Democratic Club. The editor had inserted applause immediately after Feinstein apologized for her earlier Ladies' Home Journal comments, which Crile had described as Feinstein's "groveling to atone". The applause had in fact come after her condemnation of anti-gay violence and a promise to appoint a gay or lesbian member of the police commission.

In response to complaints before the episode even aired, CBS had flown the producers to San Francisco, where in an interview with local CBS affiliate KPIX the pair acknowledged that the material for the show was selected for its likelihood to be shocking. Two months after Alfred's complaint to the NNC, CBS defended its people. Network vice-president Robert Chandler dismissed the bulk of Alfred's complaints as "trivial, irrelevant or clearly represent[ing] matters of opinion or judgment". Chandler went on to acknowledge that the applause was broadcast out of sequence but denied that it was intended to deceive. "Whatever the motivation, it is clear that our producers indicated the applause out of its actual time sequence and therefore misled our viewers. This, then, constitutes an acknowledgment of error and an apology for a breach of our own journalistic standards." Regarding the program as a whole, Chandler denied any bias.

The NNC met on September 18, 1980 to consider Alfred's allegations. After dismissing many of them as without merit, The NNC found by a vote of 9–2 that CBS had unfairly misrepresented a number of sexual issues, including in the BDSM scenes. "By concentrating on certain flamboyant examples of homosexual behavior the program tended to reinforce stereotypes... The program exaggerated political concessions to gays and made them appear as threats to public morals and decency." CBS was also found to have offered distorted coverage of the city's annual Beaux Arts Ball and to have manipulated the soundtrack by adding the applause. The network later apologized for this on the air, the first time that the LGBT community had received an apology from a major news organization.

Many in the city were angered by the broadcast. The San Francisco Board of Supervisors was outraged and sent a letter of protest to CBS. Feinstein wrote to the station manager of KPIX denouncing the episode. She compared the program to "doing a documentary on Italians and only showing the Mafia". She asked for three minutes of national airtime to respond but CBS denied her request. Armistead Maupin, who had worked closely with the production team, repudiated the program, saying "I had no idea they were doing a hit piece." Jeff Jarvis of The San Francisco Examiner wrote, "It's shocking that CBS News, home of Walter Cronkite, would partake of such bigotry." Writing for the San Francisco Chronicle, Terrence O'Flaherty labeled the documentary "a dreadful little program... deadly for everyone it touches". Nationally, a spokesperson for the National Gay Task Force condemned the documentary for its premise of gays wanting political power for purposes of having sex in public, for ignoring lesbians and for failing to address issues of anti-gay discrimination.

=== Representation of BDSM ===
"Gay Power, Gay Politics" has also been criticized for its negative portrayal of the BDSM sub-culture. CBS used BDSM to discredit the LGBT community by implying that an increase in gay political power would correspond with an increase in BDSM and BDSM-related deaths. The program also miscategorized BDSM as an exclusively gay male activity, despite the fact that most of the BDSM material filmed for the documentary was shot at a location called The Chateau, which had a heterosexual customer base. Reporter Crile interviewed San Francisco coroner Dr. Boyd Stephens, who stated that 10% of homicides in the city were gay-related and that some of those were related to the BDSM community. His words, which Stephens would later acknowledge were based on hearsay, were widely and inaccurately reported as meaning that 10% of all homicides in San Francisco were related to BDSM.

=== Anti-LGBT backlash ===
Following the airing of the report, the Community United Against Violence (CUAV), a San Francisco group dedicated to addressing anti-gay violence in the city, reported a 400% increase of reported violent incidents against LGBT people. This marked a reversal of the decrease in violence reports to that point in 1980. Right-wing groups used "Gay Power, Gay Politics" as a fundraising tool until CBS forced them to stop. The Moral Majority, in its successful campaign to repeal a San Jose, California gay rights ordinance, used an image from the program along with the slogan "Don't Let It Spread!" on billboards. In 1985, a Houston group opposed to a proposed LGBT rights ordinance for the city used clips from the program in its commercials and voters overwhelmingly rejected the ordinance. Controversial psychologist Paul Cameron, on behalf of the right wing Family Research Institute, has used the 10% homicide figure to support his views on homosexuality, views which have been repudiated by a number of professional psychological and sociological associations.

=== Continued criticism ===
"Gay Power, Gay Politics" continued to be a target of criticism by LGBT community leaders and authors, although some have acknowledged that the program included "more than a few kernels of truth". Former National Gay and Lesbian Task Force executive director Urvashi Vaid attacked the program for its presentation of gays as "sexual hedonists, privileged powerbrokers, and arrogant men scheming to force their 'lifestyle' on a recalcitrant public". She further castigated the show for excluding lesbians and people of color (although she acknowledges that this to an extent mirrored the state of gay leadership at the time) and noted her belief that anti-gay attack videos produced in the 1990s were modeled on this broadcast. Gay cultural critic Frank Browning, while agreeing with the criticism of the tone of the documentary, nonetheless found the dudgeon that many in the community expressed to be "layered with disingenuousness". Browning wrote:

As a credentialed, respectable, middle-class professional—an ordinary person who reports, writes and speaks through the airwaves about conventional social issues of family, economy, health, and politics and who pursues the limits of lust in parks and sex clubs—I continue to wonder whether CBS was really incorrect in its characterization of gay men.

While echoing criticism about the exclusion of lesbian concerns and the distortions contained in the broadcast, Browning went on to note that sexual freedom has always been part of the gay male agenda and that it would be absurd to pretend otherwise.
