= Jim Rivaldo =

Political consultant (1947–2007)

- Born: April 15, 1947; Rochester, New York, United States
- Died: October 16, 2007 (aged 60); San Francisco, United States
- Education: Harvard University
- Occupation: Political consultant
- Years active: 1970s–2007
- Known for: Harvey Milk supervisor campaign

Jim Rivaldo (April 15, 1947 – October 17, 2007) was an American political consultant. He worked with Harvey Milk on his political activism and campaigns for the San Francisco Board of Supervisors. Rivaldo consulted on several political campaigns in San Francisco, including Kamala Harris's 2003 campaign for San Francisco District Attorney.

Rivaldo attended Harvard University, where he wrote for The Harvard Lampoon. After graduating, he moved to San Francisco and befriended Harvey Milk. Rivaldo consulted Milk's unsuccessful 1975 supervisor campaign. The two, who were both gay, established the Harvey Milk LGBTQ Democratic Club. Rivaldo was a consultant and graphic designer for Milk's successful 1977 supervisor campaign. He and Dick Pabich ran a political consulting company. Rivaldo worked on campaigns for candidates including Michael Hennessey, Willie Brown, Dennis Herrera, Ella Hill Hutch, Bevan Dufty, and Sophie Maxwell. In 2007, the Board of Supervisors commended Rivaldo for his role in electing gay and African-American politicians. He died in 2007.

== Early life ==
Jim Rivaldo was born on April 15, 1947, in Rochester, New York. He had an older brother, Joseph, and a sister, Jane. According to Joseph, he became interested in reading the news as a child. In high school, he was the student body president. He studied government at Harvard University, graduating in 1969. He wrote for The Harvard Lampoon for four years, leading its 1968 parody of Life magazine.

Rivaldo initially aspired to become a politician but gave up when he realized he was gay. Upon graduating, he worked for the New Left magazine Ramparts. He moved to San Francisco in December 1971, after coming out as gay. He later said of this move, "I used to think that all gay people were hairdressers. It took coming here to find that there were gay lawyers, gay businessmen—a lot of people like me." He settled in the new neighborhood of Haight–Fillmore, where he founded the neighborhood association.

== Career ==
=== Work with Harvey Milk ===
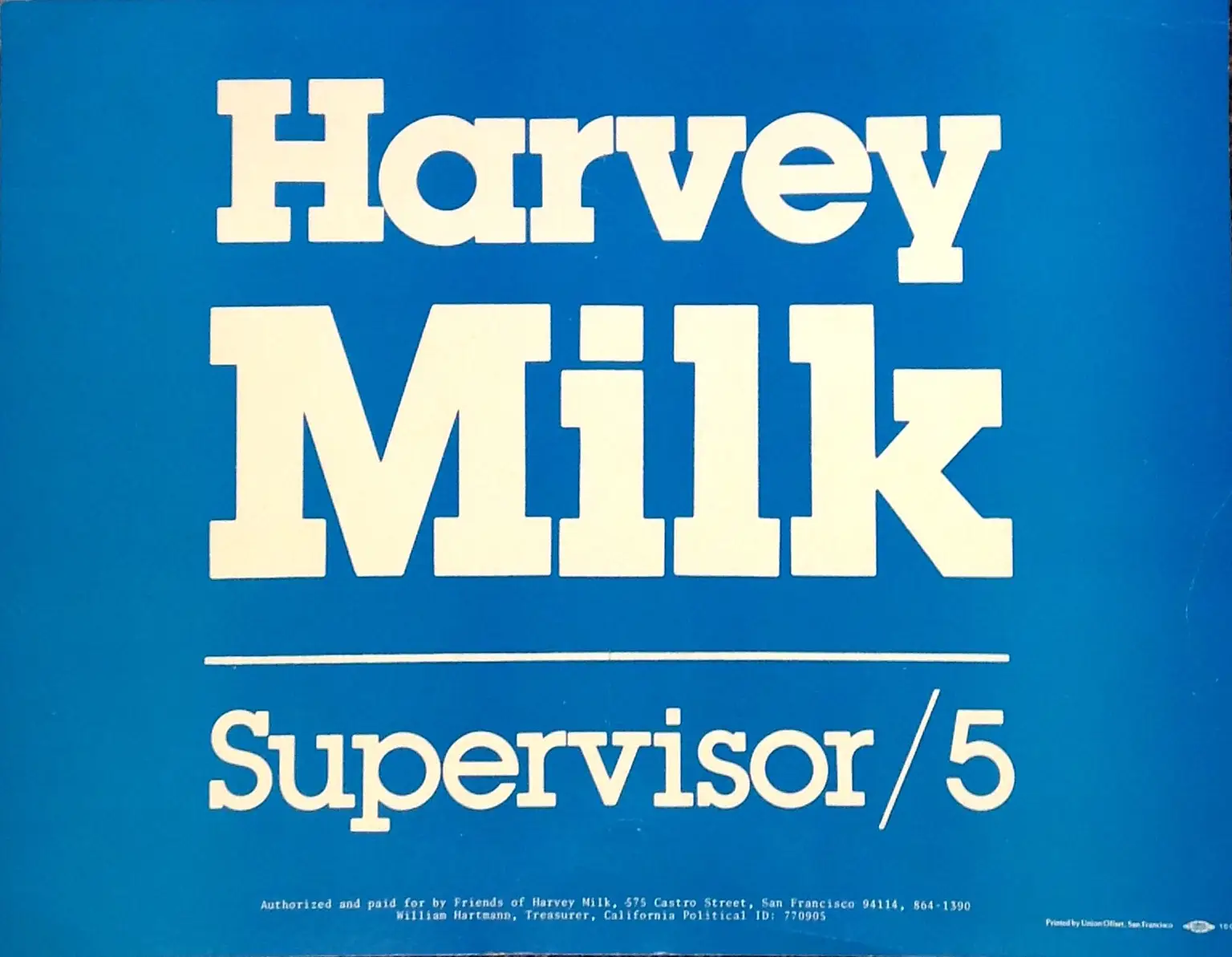
1977 Harvey Milk campaign sign designed by Rivaldo

Rivaldo befriended Harvey Milk in the early 1970s after shopping at his camera store. The store hired Rivaldo as a human billboard. Upon learning of Rivaldo's interest in politics, Milk asked him to be his political strategist. Rivaldo analyzed voter lists, accompanied Milk on campaign stops, and edited his speeches and brochures. Rivaldo, Frank M. Robinson, and Danny Nicoletta worked on Milk's 1975 campaign for San Francisco Board of Supervisors. Though Milk lost, Rivaldo noted that he had won in the Castro and Haight-Ashbury districts, telling him, "We got the hippie, McGovern, and fruit voters."

Milk and Rivaldo decided to found the San Francisco Gay Democratic Club (now the Harvey Milk LGBTQ Democratic Club) with the goal of getting Milk a seat on the Board of Supervisors. They envisioned it as an antithesis to the Alice B. Toklas Memorial Democratic Club, which did not push for gay people to be represented in government. Rivaldo and Dick Pabich worked on Milk's 1977 campaign. Rivaldo designed a popular campaign sign with the words "Milk Supervisor/5". Milk won and became one of the first openly gay officeholders in the United States. In 1978, he made brochures opposing the Briggs Initiative, which would have banned homosexual teachers in public schools. Milk appointed him as San Francisco's representative in the California Coastal Commission, making him the state's first openly gay commissioner.

When Milk was assassinated at San Francisco City Hall, Rivaldo was the last person to see and talk to him, besides the assassination's other victim, George Moscone. Rivaldo recalled, "Harvey and I were going to go to the bank at Golden Gate and Polk. He said, 'Let me finish up a few things and I'll be right back.'" The day before the assassination, he had spoken with Milk about a potential 1983 mayoral campaign. Rivaldo made funeral arrangements. For the fifteenth anniversary of the assassination, he designed a plaque to mark the site of Milk's camera store.

=== Later campaigns ===
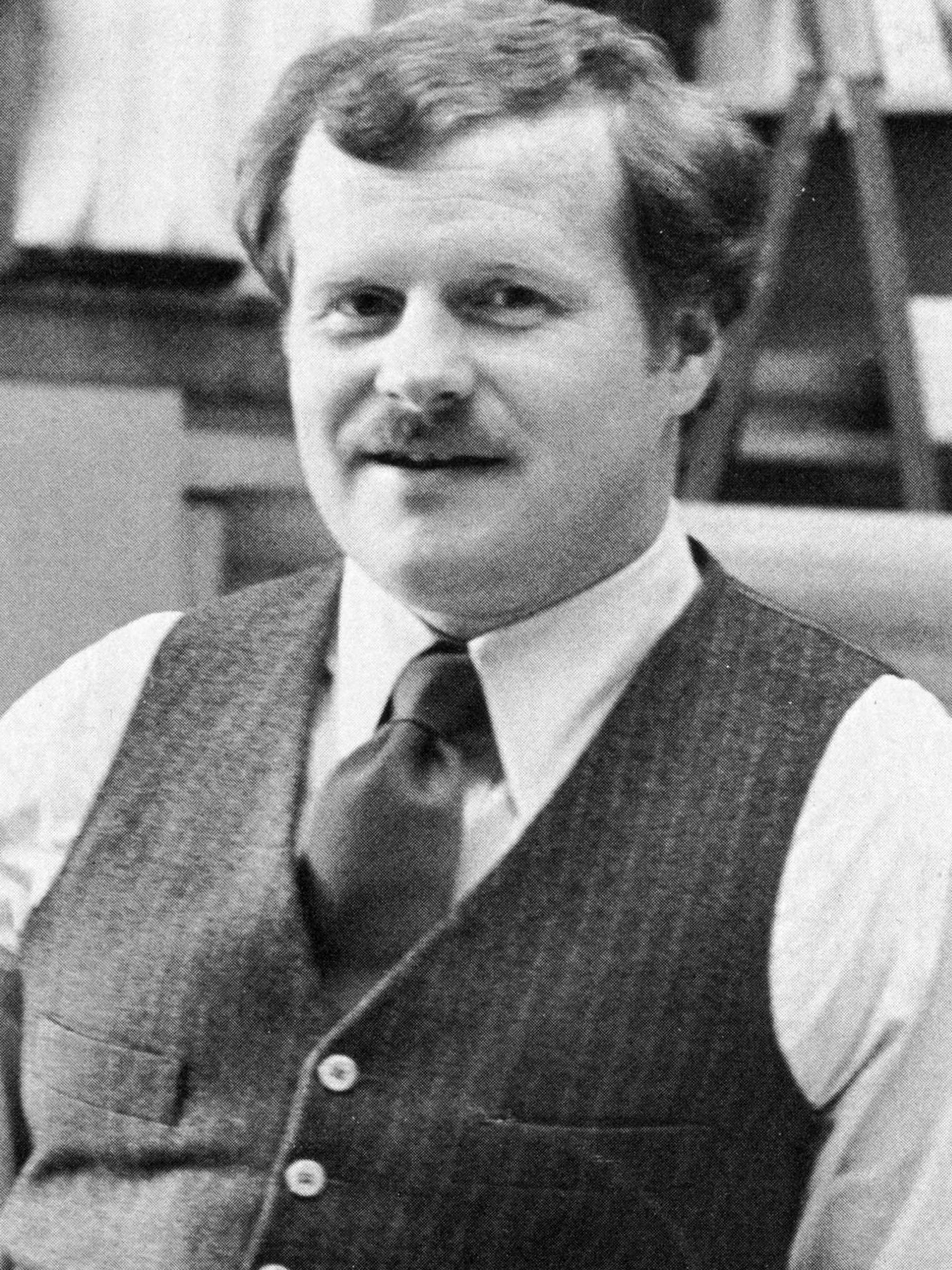
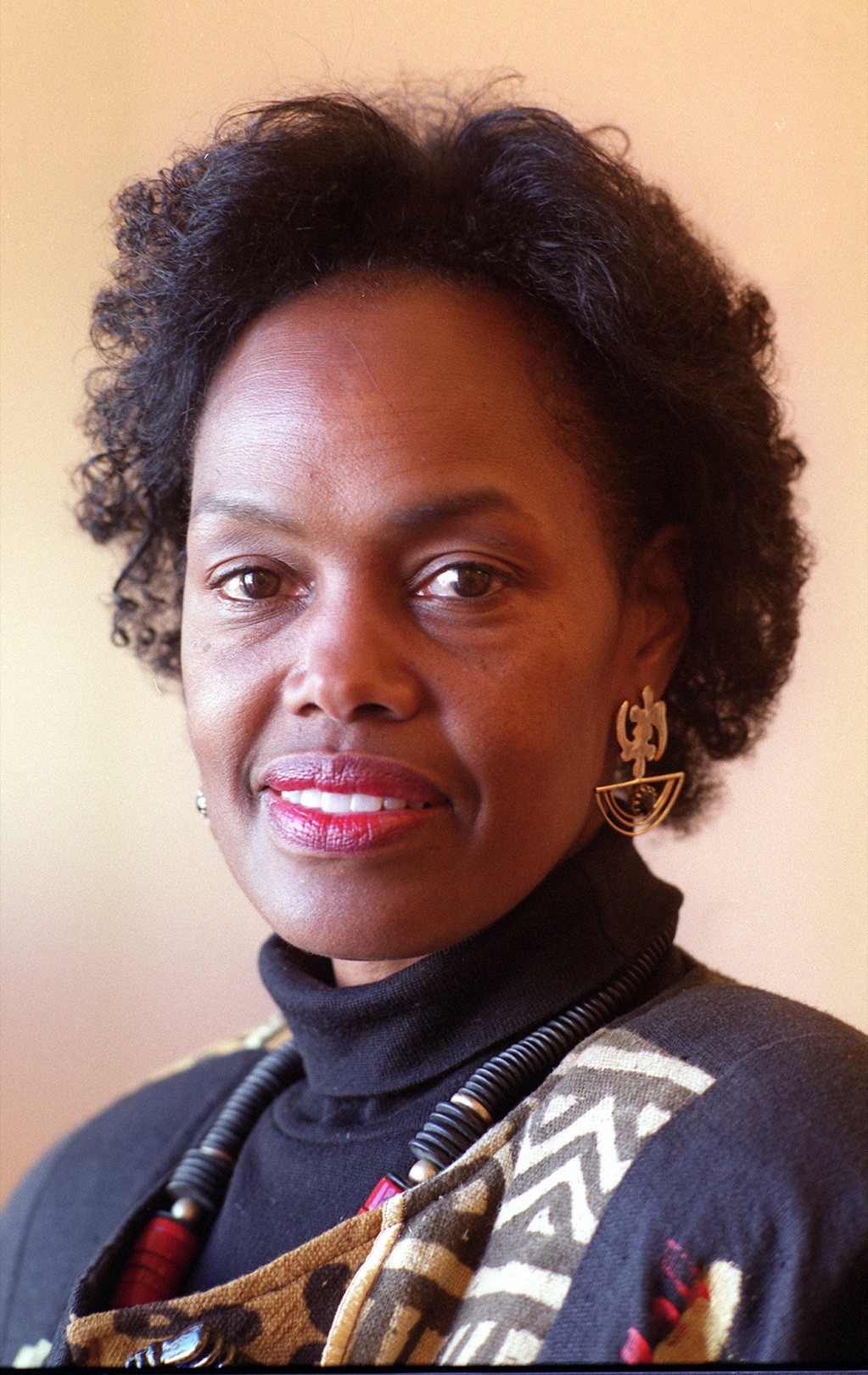
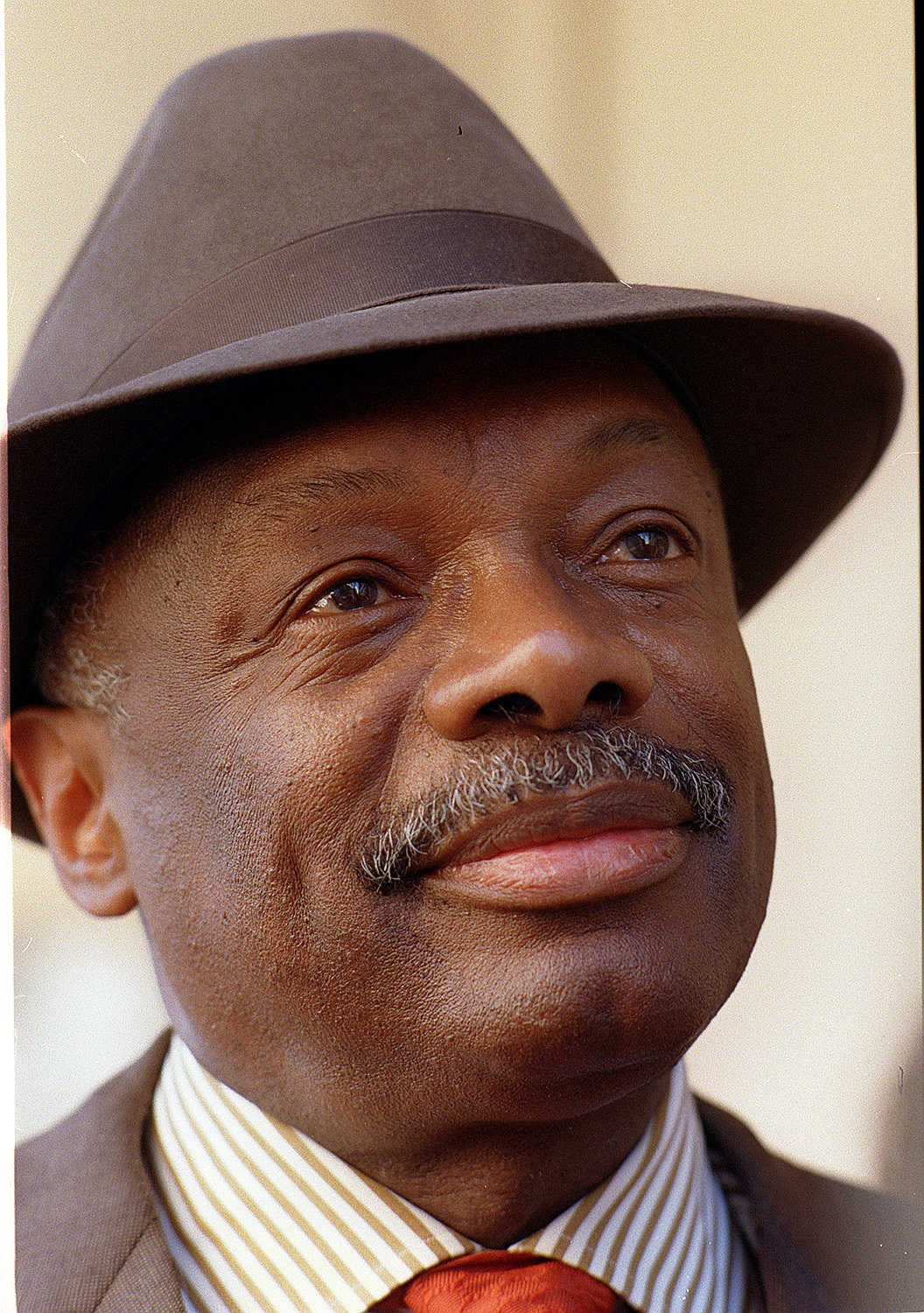
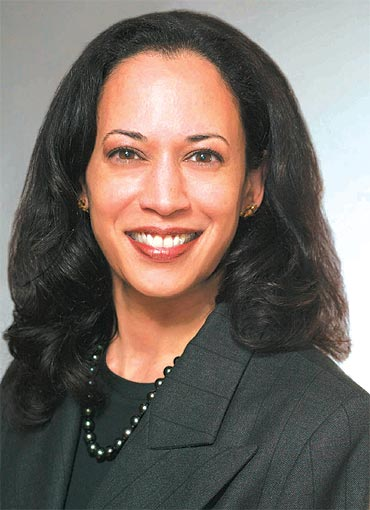
Candidates who worked with Rivaldo: Michael Hennessey, Sophie Maxwell, Willie Brown, Kamala Harris

Rivaldo and Pabich founded a company that consulted on California political campaigns in the 1980s and 1990s. Rivaldo worked on all of Michael Hennessey's campaigns for San Francisco Sheriff from 1979 until Rivaldo's death. Rivaldo has said he designed the world's first brochure on safe sex around 1982.

In the 1999 San Francisco mayoral election, he consulted on Willie Brown's campaign. He also approved of Brown's opponent, Tom Ammiano, whom he had previously worked with. He managed Dennis Herrera's 2001 campaign for City Attorney of San Francisco. Herrera, an underdog candidate, won after a runoff. In the 2003 San Francisco mayoral election, Rivaldo did not work on any campaign but supported Gavin Newsom. Other campaigns he worked on included Ella Hill Hutch, Bevan Dufty, and Sophie Maxwell.

Rivaldo worked on Kamala Harris's first campaign, running for District Attorney of San Francisco in 2003. The campaign was the last Rivaldo worked on. Harris credited Rivaldo for winning the election and for influencing her political career. She said of Rivaldo in a 2024 interview, "He was just family. In fact, my mother took care of him as he was sick and dying."

On September 25, 2007, the San Francisco Board of Supervisors gave a commendation to Rivaldo and, posthumously, Pabich. The board said the two "were instrumental in electing a new kind of politician—openly and proudly gay with roots in progressive neighborhood activism... To far less fanfare, Jim helped elect every San Francisco African-American candidate in the 1970s and 1980s." The Alice B. Toklas LGBT Democratic Club and Harvey Milk LGBT Democratic Club presented him with lifetime achievement awards. Rivaldo spoke at the ceremony, saying his biggest pride was working with Milk.

== Personal life ==
Rivaldo was known as the "Mister Rogers of the gay liberation movement" for his gentle demeanor. He made little money compared to other campaign managers. He lived in the Western Addition district of San Francisco for a long time, living on Bush Street at the time of his death.

=== Death and legacy ===
Rivaldo had AIDS, hepatitis C, liver cancer, and diabetes. The AIDS Housing Alliance provided him an apartment and a caretaker. After a year of declining health, he died of liver cancer on the afternoon of October 16, 2007. He died at his home with family members present. A public memorial was held on November 15.

Writing for The Bay Area Reporter, Shum Preston, an associate of Rivaldo, called him a "great gay genius lost to history". He was depicted as a minor character in the biopic Milk, on which he was a historical consultant.
