= Harvey Milk LGBTQ Democratic Club =

Democratic club founded in 1976 by Harvey Milk and his supporters

Based in San Francisco, California, the Harvey Milk LGBTQ Democratic Club is a chapter of the Stonewall Democrats, named after LGBT politician and activist Harvey Milk. Believing that the existing Alice B. Toklas LGBT Democratic Club would never support him in his political aspirations, Milk co-founded the political club under the name "San Francisco Gay Democratic Club" in the wake of his unsuccessful 1976 campaign for the California State Assembly. Joining Milk in forming the club were a number of the city's activists, including Harry Britt, Dick Pabich, Jim Rivaldo, and first club president Chris Perry.

The club set forth the following as its organizing statement:

No decisions which affect our lives should be made without the gay voice being heard. We want our fair share of city services. We want openly gay people appointed and elected to city offices—people who reflect the diversity of our community. We want the schools of San Francisco to provide full exposure to and positive appreciation of gay lifestyles. We are asking no more than we deserve: We will not settle for less.

== History ==
One of the club's early actions was to demonstrate at a speech given by Vice President Walter Mondale in Golden Gate Park on June 17, 1977. When Mondale began speaking about human rights in Latin America, demonstrators held up signs demanding a statement on human rights in the United States. When a demonstrator verbally challenged Mondale to say something about gay rights, Mondale angrily left the stage.

Harvey Milk, unfazed by previous electoral defeats, established the San Francisco Gay Democratic Club to amass greater political backing. He championed for a restructuring of the Board of Supervisors election from a citywide, at-large setup to a geographical district one. Re-entering the political arena in 1977, Milk aimed to broaden his appeal beyond the gay community by advocating for tax code reforms to stimulate industry growth, the creation of affordable housing, and the establishment of day care centers for working mothers.

Following the assassination of Harvey Milk in 1978, the club changed its name to the Harvey Milk Democratic Club in his memory. The club bills itself as one of the largest Democratic clubs in San Francisco.

The club was an inadvertent catalyst of a journalistic scandal for CBS. CBS News producers George Crile and Grace Diekhaus manipulated footage of an appearance by Dianne Feinstein and included it in the 1980 documentary Gay Power, Gay Politics. The National News Council found that this manipulation was a breach of journalistic ethics.

With the onset of the AIDS epidemic, the Milk Club was an early advocate of closing down the city's gay bathhouses. The club also created some of the earliest safe sex education materials in the country.

== SFPD Apology ==
Shortly before San Francisco's annual Pride parade in 2019, a year that marked the 40th anniversary of the White Night riots, the Milk Club's executive board penned an open letter calling on the San Francisco Police Department to apologize for historic acts of violence against the city's LGBTQ community, including the ACT UP Castro Sweep in 1989, the White Night riot in 1979, and the Compton's Cafeteria riot in 1966.

During San Francisco's 2019 Pride parade, the SFPD engaged in a violent confrontation with a group of LGBTQ protesters who blocked the parade, calling for an end to corporate sponsorships of Pride. The Milk Club released another letter shortly after, condemning the SFPD's actions at Pride. “The irony of SFPD committing acts of brutality against peaceful protesters of the Resistance Contingent at the San Francisco Pride Parade on the 50th Anniversary of Stonewall is not lost on us,” the Milk Club wrote. “It warrants outrage and swift recourse.”

On August 26, 2019, SFPD leadership held a community meeting during which Chief William Scott said, "we the members of the San Francisco Police Department are here to reflect and apologize for our past actions against the LGBTQ community. We want to listen to you and want to truly hear you, we will atone for our past.” While Scott's apology was met with "exuberant applause from the room," some attendees at the meeting expressed their concern about the ways in which the SFPD currently discriminates against LGBTQ people.

Anubis Daugherty, a young LGBTQ community member who was homeless for six years, told Scott that LGBTQ people are disproportionately caught up in sweeps of homeless communities in the city. “I was born here, I was raised here,” Daugherty said. “If you want to truly apologize for something you have to stop what you’re doing.”

== See also ==
- Alice B. Toklas LGBT Democratic Club
- National Stonewall Democrats
