= Richard S. Salant =

President of the CBS News

- Born: April 14, 1914; Manhattan, New York City, New York
- Died: February 16, 1993 (aged 78); Southport, Connecticut
- Education: Harvard University
- Occupation: President of CBS News

Richard Samuel Salant (April 14, 1914 – February 16, 1993) was a CBS executive from 1952 and president of the CBS News division from 1961 to 1964 and 1966–79. He was noted for the introduction of 60 Minutes and the CBS Morning News and Sunday Morning programs during his tenure and for his quest to shape broadcast journalism integrity in the face of the industry's own tendency to emphasize entertainment content, and in the face of pushback from the Nixon administration regarding unfavorable reporting on the conduct of the US Department of Defense during the Vietnam War era.

== Early life and career ==
Salant was born in New York City's borough of Manhattan. He graduated from Harvard University in 1935 and Harvard Law School in 1938. In his early career, he was a lawyer for the National Labor Relations Board in Washington, DC. Between 1940 and 1943, he held various posts in the U.S. Department of Justice. He joined the U.S. Navy as a lieutenant commander during World War II. Upon leaving the Navy, he joined the Manhattan law firm of Rosenman, Goldmark, Colin & Kaye and worked on behalf of the Columbia Broadcasting System as his client."

Salant first married Rosalind Robb, whom he divorced. In 1953, he married the former Frances Trainer. Salant had three daughters, Linda, Susan, and Priscilla, plus a son, Robb, with his first wife. He had one daughter, Sarah, with his second wife.

== Career with CBS ==
Salant's legal work for CBS led him to join that company in 1952 as a vice president. He represented CBS in hearings before the Federal Communications Commission and Congressional committees and headed the CBS legal team in litigation with RCA–NBC over which side would develop the standards and technology for color television. Although CBS lost the suit, he impressed the network's president, Frank Stanton, who influenced him to pursue broadcast journalism. Salant worked as Stanton's assistant for nine years and would become the president of the CBS News Division when Stanton appointed him to replace Sig Mickelson in February of 1961.

Salant was president of CBS News from 1961 to 1964 and from 1966 to 1979. The New York Times credits him with raising professional standards and expanding news programming at CBS. During his tenure, CBS was the first network to expand its weeknight news report from 15 to 30 minutes. Under his leadership, CBS also introduced "60 Minutes" and the "CBS Morning News" and "Sunday Morning" programs. Salant's first major decision was to replace Douglas Edwards with Walter Cronkite. At this time CBS was the only news station to have single anchors. His support of "60 Minutes" in 1968 was reluctant, since felt that this program money for more ambitious documentaries would be more cost-effective.

Salant was a critical thinker regarding the news media's First Amendment rights and responsibilities. He broadcast the documentary "The Selling of the Pentagon," which "examined the military's manipulation of public opinion and the news media, including CBS". The House Commerce Committee subpoenaed Stanton, regarding this program, ordering him to provide copies of the outtakes and scripts from the documentary. Stanton refused, risking contempt of Congress charges, claiming a "chilling effect" on broadcast journalism that would result from compliance. Among Salant's other concerns during his tenure with CBS News were his concern that television news was becoming primarily an entertainment vehicle and the pressure that he felt from the White House via CBS president William S. Paley to fire Daniel Schorr for his reporting that reflected poorly on the administration of Richard Nixon.

== After CBS ==
In his book, Salant, CBS, and the Battle for the Soul of Broadcast Journalism: The Memoirs of Richard S. Salant, he cited Stanton's assessment upon his retirement that CBS had become so large that an individual broadcaster could no longer be in charge of decisions. The responsibilities for decisions became spread among many managers. Salant's challenges within management earned him a nickname, "the porcupine". The post-Stanton era was difficult for Salant because he had outstayed everyone that had come before him. The mandatory retirement policy of 65 required Salant to leave CBS. He had spent 27 years with CBS and 16 of them as the head of CBS News. He then moved to NBC to become vice chairman, but didn't feel positioned to make a mark there. He retired from broadcasting on April 30, 1983. He retained his interest in broadcasting after retirement when he was appointed president and chief executive officer of the National News Council, a nonprofit organization dedicated to strengthening press freedom and advancement of the fairness and accuracy of journalism.

== Recognition ==
- 1979: Paul White Award, Radio Television Digital News Association
