= Don Amador =

American gay activist

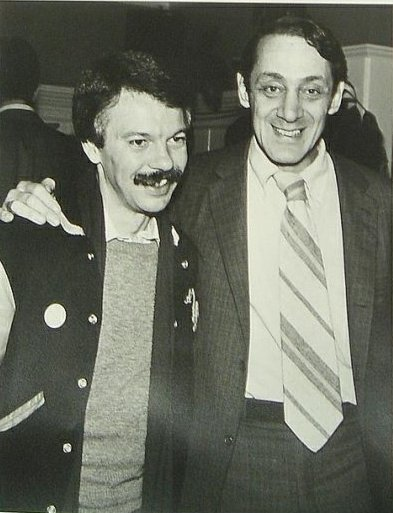
Don Amador and Harvey Milk

Donald Grace (October 23, 1942 – August 13, 1992), also known as Don Amador, was an American gay activist. He taught one of the first gay studies courses in the United States. The LGBT and AIDS activist Cleve Jones, a friend of both Amador and Harvey Milk, portrayed Amador in the biographical film Milk (2008).

== Early life ==
Don Amador was born as Donald Grace on October 23, 1942, in Troy, New York. He reported "knowing he was different" while growing up; his first homosexual experience occurred at age 11.

At 17 years old, he left high school and joined the United States Navy, serving in the Vietnam War. He was honorably discharged and went for one year to a monastery before leaving to join an ecumenical project in Boston. He reenlisted in 1965 and worked with Chief Richard J. Amador, a recent widower whose only son had died in the Invasion of Normandy. In 1971, the chief legally adopted him.

At his adopted father's insistence, Don Amador returned to school, eventually achieving a master's degree in urban anthropology. His thesis focused on the gay community in Los Angeles.

== Career ==
Beginning in 1976, Don Amador taught one of the United States' first gay studies courses, at California State University.

In his gay history course, Amador argued that King David, Alexander the Great, Michelangelo Buonarotti and Pyotr Ilyich Tchaikovsky were gay and taught that Thomas Jefferson framed a Virginia bill in 1776 to make homosexuality "punishable by castration". He also distinguished between the terms "homosexuality" and "gay": "Homosexual is merely what you do in bed; being gay is an entire life-style on its own." Amador collected 14 of the best papers of his course to create a pioneering book in gay studies.

Amador was named "official liaison to the gay community" by Los Angeles Mayor Tom Bradley. In 1977, he ran for the California State Assembly, polling seventh out of 18 candidates. In 1980, he ran for the Los Angeles City Council. "I want to be a role model for gay people," Amador said. "Someday I hope there will be equal rights for all. We shall overcome."

== Personal life ==
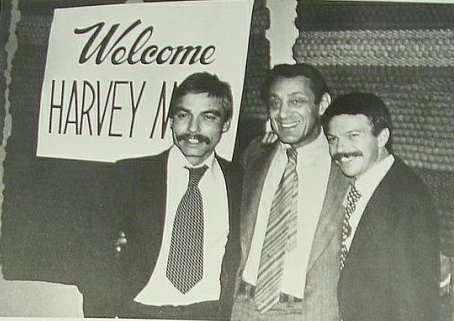
Don Amador, his husband Tony Karnes, and Harvey Milk

Beginning in 1970, Amador was in a relationship with Tony Karnes. They considered themselves married and had a wedding ceremony on the steps of the Blessed Sacrament Catholic Church, Hollywood.

The couple, together with Amador's adoptive father, Richard J. Amador, lived in a mansion built for the actress Mary Miles Minter. His father died in 1983 at 80 years old and is buried at Holy Cross Cemetery, Culver City.

Don Amador died on August 13, 1992.

== Legacy ==
Cleve Jones, a friend of his, portrayed Amador in biographical film Milk (2008), while Jones is portrayed by Emile Hirsch.
