= List of political biography films =

This is a list of political biography films. It includes any biographical films about politicians, heads of state, or people who were otherwise mainly known for their political involvement.

== Australia ==
John Curtin

- Curtin (2007)

Bob Hawke, Prime Minister.

- Hawke (2010)

== Canada ==
Jack Layton

- Jack (2013)

John Diefenbaker, Prime Minister

- One Canadian: The Political Memoirs of the Rt. Hon. John G. Diefenbaker (1976; miniseries)

Pierre Elliot Trudeau, Prime Minister

- Trudeau (2002; miniseries)

== China ==
Puyi

- The Last Emperor

Mao Zedong

- Mao Zedong 1949

Deng Xiaoping

- Deng Xiaoping

== Germany ==
Adolf Hitler

- Downfall

== India ==
Jawaharlal Nehru

- Our Prime Minister (1957)

Narendra Modi

- PM Narendra Modi (2019)

Vinayak Damodar Savarkar

- Swatantrya Veer Savarkar (2024)

Lal Bahadur Shastri

- Jai Jawaan Jai Kisaan (2015)

Manmohan Singh

- The Accidental Prime Minister (2019)

Yogi Adityanath

- Ajey: The Untold Story of a Yogi (2025)

== Iraq ==
Saddam Hussein

- Al-ayyam al-tawila (1980)

== Israel ==
Golda Meir, Prime Minister

- Golda (film)

== Italy ==
Benito Mussolini

- The Assassination of Matteotti (1973)
- Benito (1993)
- Fairytale (2022)
- I'm Back (2018)
- Last Days of Mussolini (1974)
- Lion of the Desert (1981)
- Mussolini and I (1985)
- Vincere (2009; about first wife Ida Dalser)

Galeazzo Ciano

- Mussolini and I (1985)

Giacomo Matteotti

- The Assassination of Matteotti (1973)

Giulio Andreotti, Prime Minister.

- Il divo

Silvio Berlusconi, Prime Minister.

- Loro

Alcide De Gasperi, Prime Minister.

- Anno uno

== Pakistan ==
Muhammad Ali Jinnah

- Jinnah (1998)

== Philippines ==
Manuel L. Quezon, President

- Quezon's Game

== Russia and Soviet Union ==
Joseph Stalin

- The Death of Stalin (2017)
- Stalin (1992)

== South Africa ==
Nelson Mandela

- Mandela: Long Walk to Freedom (2013)
- Endgame (2009)
- Goodbye Bafana (2007)
- Invictus (2009)
- Mandela (1987)
- Mandela (1996)
- Mandela's Gun (2016)
- Winnie Mandela (2011)

== Uganda ==
Idi Amin

- The Last King of Scotland (2006)
- Operation Thunderbolt (1977)
- Raid on Entebbe (1977)
- Rise and Fall of Idi Amin (1981)
- Victory at Entebbe (1976)

== United Kingdom ==
Margaret Thatcher

- Margaret
- The Iron Lady

Tony Blair

- The Deal
- The Special Relationship

=== British royalty ===
Elizabeth I

- Elizabeth

Elizabeth II

- The Queen (2006)
- A Royal Night Out (2015)

== United States ==
George W. Bush, 43rd president.

- W.

Lyndon B. Johnson, 36th president.

- LBJ

John F. Kennedy, 35th president.

- JFK

Ted Kennedy, senator.

- Chappaquiddick

Abraham Lincoln, 16th president.

- Lincoln

Richard Nixon, 37th president.

- Nixon

Ronald Reagan, 40th president.

- Reagan

Harvey Milk, San Francisco council member.

- Milk

Dick Cheney, 46th vice president.

- Vice

Donald Trump, 45th and 47th president.

- The Apprentice

JD Vance, 50th vice president.

- Hillbilly Elegy
