= Marie Equi =

American doctor and radical (1872–1952)

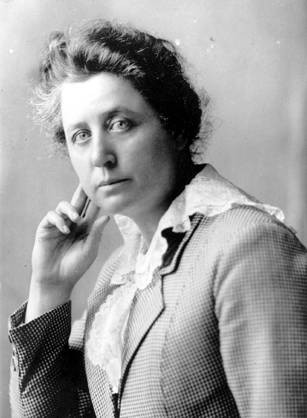
- Born: Marie Diana Equi; April 7, 1872; New Bedford, Massachusetts, U.S.
- Died: July 13, 1952 (aged 80); Portland, Oregon, U.S.
- Resting place: Wilhelm's Portland Memorial Funeral Home (Harding West H, Tier 7 Vault 1)
- Occupation: Physician
- Children: 1

Marie Equi (April 7, 1872 – July 13, 1952) was an early American medical doctor devoted to providing care to working-class and poor patients. She regularly provided birth control information and abortions at a time when both were illegal. She became a political activist and advocated civic and economic reforms, including women's right to vote and an eight-hour workday. After being clubbed by a policeman in a 1913 workers' strike, Equi aligned herself with anarchists and the radical labor movement.

Equi was a lesbian in a relationship with Harriet Frances Speckart (1883 – May 15, 1927) for more than a decade. The two women adopted an infant and raised the child in an early example of same-sex parenting in the United States. For her radical politics and same-sex relations, Equi battled discrimination and harassment. In 1918, Equi was convicted under the Sedition Act for speaking against U.S. involvement in World War I. She was sentenced to a three-year term at San Quentin State Prison.

== Early years ==
Equi was the daughter of John Equi, an Italian immigrant, and Sarah Mullins, an Irish immigrant. She was born the fifth child and fifth daughter in a large working-class family in New Bedford, the former whaling capital of the world that became a textile manufacturing powerhouse during Equi's early years. She attended New Bedford High School for one year before dropping out to work in a textile mill to support herself. In 1892 Equi escaped a grim future in the mills and joined her high school girlfriend, Bessie Holcomb, on an Oregon homestead along the Columbia River.

== A lesbian woman ==
In the late 19th century, little was known or publicly discussed about same-sex affairs between women. Instead, in some spheres of society in the United States, people recognized "romantic friendships" among women. Wealthy and professional women at the time undertook what were called "Boston Marriages." These associations entailed varying degrees of emotional and affectionate intimacy between two women and, often, sexual activity as well.

Marie Equi once remarked that as a young woman, she had spurned the interests of a young man, and she expressed little interest in a heterosexual pairing or marriage. Equi's lengthy relationship with Bessie Holcomb, from 1892 until 1901, was dissimilar from the Boston Marriages adopted by upper-class women due to Equi's working-class background. Equi lived much of her adult life with other women but was never a separatist. She treated male patients in her medical practice and worked closely with men in many of her political activities. She undertook the longest lesbian relationship of her life in 1905 after meeting a younger woman, Harriet Speckart, the niece of Olympia Brewing Company founder Leopold Schmidt. Speckart's family was vehemently opposed to the two women's relationship, and Speckart battled in the courts for years with her mother and brother to receive her rightful inheritance. After ten years of sharing a life, Equi and Speckart adopted an infant girl, Mary, because Speckart wanted to raise a child. As an adult, Mary recalled that she had called Speckart "ma" and Equi "da" since everyone called Equi "Doc." In later years, the two women separated but remained close until Speckart died in 1927.

Equi also became involved with other prominent, professional women. When birth control advocate Margaret Sanger lectured in Portland in 1916, Equi became smitten with her. She later wrote letters to Sanger that referred to sexual intimacy between them during Sanger's earlier visit. Archivist Judith Schwartz has described Equi's letters to Sanger as "love letters."

Equi's intimate relationships with Holcomb in the 1890s and with Speckart in the early 1900s established her as the first publicly known lesbian on the U.S. West Coast.

== Homesteading and medical study ==
Equi and Holcomb lived a quiet life as close companions in a small house on several rocky acres outside the small city of The Dalles. On July 21, 1893, a local newspaper, The Dalles Times-Mountaineer, reported the sensational ruckus earlier that day that drew crowds of merchants and shoppers to the town center. Equi paced back and forth in front of the office of the Reverend Orson D. Taylor, a land developer and also the superintendent of the Wasco Independent Academy. Taylor had reneged on paying Holcomb her full salary for teaching at the institution. Frustrated over the mistreatment of her companion, Equi horsewhipped Taylor when he tried to escape from his office. Many people in The Dalles regarded Taylor as a crook who peddled fraudulent land deals, and they applauded Equi's assault. They later held a raffle for the whip and gave the proceeds to the two women. The event became the public's first exposure to Equi's bold defense of justice.

In 1897, the pair moved to San Francisco, California, where Equi began studying medicine. She completed two years of coursework, first at the Physicians & Surgeons Medical College and then at the University of California Medical Department. She relocated to Portland, Oregon – without Bessie Holcomb – and completed her studies at the University of Oregon Medical Department in 1903.

== Medical care and social activism ==
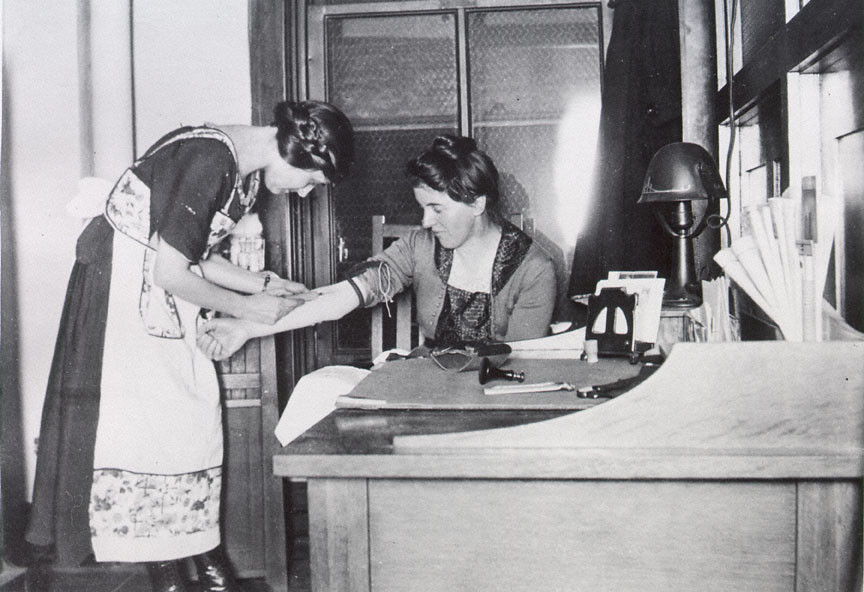
An assistant with a patient at Equi's Portland, Oregon office

Marie Equi became one of the first 60 women to become a physician in Oregon. She established a general medicine practice in Portland in 1905, emphasizing the health concerns of women and children. Her role as a physician became widely known to the public once she volunteered to join a group of doctors and nurses who provided medical care to people stricken during the 1906 San Francisco earthquake and fire. Equi's courageous volunteer work was hailed by California's governor, San Francisco's mayor, and the U.S. Army, which awarded her a medal and a commendation.

At some point between 1905 and 1915, Equi began to provide abortions and did so without regard for social class or status. She often charged wealthy women more for the procedure to help cover the costs of poor patients. Although city and state authorities frequently tried to halt the practice of abortion with prosecutions, Equi never faced legal consequences for her services. Unlike several of her colleagues, she retained her general medical practice and did not focus on abortion alone.

Equi was an active member of Portland's Birth Control League and helped disseminate information about birth control when such activity was illegal. When Margaret Sanger visited Portland in 1916, the authorities arrested her, Equi, and other women and men who distributed Sanger's Family Limitation booklet. The judge found them guilty, ordered fines for the men (and then suspended them) and no fees for the women. Equi continued to be an advocate for birth control.

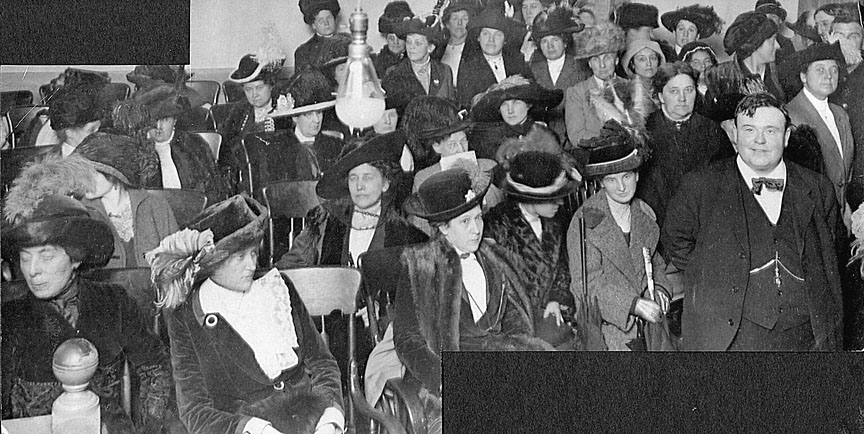
Crowd of women in Portland, Oregon register for jury duty after gaining right to vote, 1912

During the Progressive Era (from 1895 to 1920), Oregon adopted civic and political reforms that became a model for the nation, including the initiative and referendum process, recall of elected officials, and direct election of U.S. Senators. Equi worked in several campaigns to secure women's right to vote in Oregon and celebrated victory in 1912 when women gained suffrage in the state.

== Radical politics ==
In 1913, Equi visited the site of a strike by cannery workers in east Portland at the Oregon Packing Company. The workers, primarily women, protested poor working conditions, uncertain work hours, and a wage of only five to eight cents an hour. Once socialists and members of the Industrial Workers of the World (IWW) joined the strike in support of the women, the struggle expanded to include the right to free speech. Equi joined the protest and became one of its leaders, partly due to her professional stature as a physician. After days of picketing, the police stormed the strikers. Equi was clubbed by an officer after she became enraged that the police had dragged away a 30-year-old pregnant woman. After several more days, the strike ended in unsatisfactory terms for the women workers. For Equi, the police brutality she witnessed had radicalized her, and she turned away from her earlier advocacy of Progressive reforms.

Equi became influential in Portland's unemployment crisis in 1913-1914. She regularly marched with jobless men, demanded better working conditions for them, and engaged in the IWW's free speech fights and support for lumber workers in the region's forests. She declared herself a Radical Socialist and anarchist and aligned herself with the IWW.

== Opposition to World War I and punishment ==
During the increasingly contentious times leading to the U.S. entering World War I, Equi objected to the nation's war preparedness campaigns. She believed the war efforts represented a grab for profits by capitalists and an imperialistic adventure for the government. Massive preparedness parades were held in all major U.S. cities in 1915 and 1916. Portland entered a phase of hyper-nationalism, and Equi became more of a political outsider than before. She protested a pre-war campaign in downtown Portland and unfurled a banner reading "Prepare to die, workingmen, JP Morgan & Co. want preparedness for profit." Others attacked her in the march, and a fight ensued, leading to her arrest.

Equi continued to protest once the US entered the war in 1917. The US government believed that Equi was a dangerous threat to national security and charged and convicted her of sedition under the newly revised Espionage Act. Equi attempted appeals to the higher courts, but her arguments were rejected. President Woodrow Wilson commuted her three-year sentence to one year and a day at the last minute before her imprisonment.

Equi served her time in San Quentin State Prison in northern California, beginning her term on October 19, 1920, as inmate number 34110. She was forty-eight years old. She shared the women's quarters with thirty-one other inmates, many of them serving sentences for homicide, theft, and performing abortions. Equi was the only "political" among them.

Equi's health suffered while in prison with flare-ups of tuberculosis that she had contracted in childhood. She maintained her morale as best she could with the moral support from many visitors and letter writers. She sought early release through a pardon or parole, but the US Attorney General apparently blocked any leniency for her. Equi left San Quentin on August 9, 1921, with a reduced sentence due to good behavior. She had served nearly ten months.

== Later years ==
Americans tried to forget the war years in the 1920s, but they nevertheless were swept into a heightened fear of radicals, labor unionists, and communists that became known as the "Red Scare." Equi re-entered public life with her political comrades imprisoned or greatly restricted from protest activity. Equi returned to her medical practice.

Between 1926 and 1936, Equi invited the IWW leader Elizabeth Gurley Flynn to live with her and help care for Equi's daughter. Flynn suffered serious health problems, including exhaustion from overwork and depression from political setbacks. Equi, Flynn, and Equi's daughter lived at 1423 SW Hall in Portland's Westside neighborhood—Gander Ridge of Goose Hollow at 1423 SW Hall. In 1930, Equi suffered a heart attack, sold her medical practice, and asked Flynn to assist her for several more years. Finally, Flynn retreated to the East and resumed her work. She became a national leader of the Communist Party USA.

Equi led a quiet life following Flynn's departure and then her daughter's elopement. Radical and labor leaders continued to revere her for her courage and compassion; several visited her at her house.

Equi is interred in Harding west H, Tier 7 Vault 1

In 1950, Equi fractured her hip in a fall and spent a year at Good Samaritan Hospital in Portland and then at a nursing home outside Portland near the town of Gresham. She died at Fairlawn Hospital on July 13, 1952, at 80. Her obituaries ran in newspapers nationwide, including those in Portland, New Bedford, Massachusetts, and the New York Times. Equi's activist friend Julia Ruuttila described her as "a woman of passion and conviction (and) a real friend of the have-nots of this world." She is interred alongside Harriet Speckart at Wilhelm's Portland Memorial, Portland, Multnomah County, Oregon.

In August 2019, Equi was one of the honorees inducted in the Rainbow Honor Walk, a walk of fame in San Francisco’s Castro neighborhood noting LGBTQ people who have "made significant contributions in their fields."

== See also ==
- Elizabeth Gurley Flynn § Personal life
- Doc Marie's, an LGBT-friendly bar in Portland, Oregon, named after Equi
- History of lesbianism in the United States
- Industrial Workers of the World
- LGBTQ culture in Portland, Oregon
- List of LGBTQ people from Portland, Oregon
- Espionage Act of 1917
- San Quentin Rehabilitation Center

== Bibliography ==
Journal Articles

- Krieger, Nancy (1983). "Queen of the Bolsheviks: The Hidden History of Dr. Marie Equi". Radical America. 17 (5): 55–73. PMID 11618009.
- Cook, Tom (June 1997). "Radical Politics, Radical Love: The Life of Dr. Marie Equi". Northwest Gay and Lesbian Historian. 1 (3).
- Helquist, Michael (Fall 2007). "Portland to the Rescue, The Rose City's Response to the 1906 San Francisco Earthquake and Fire". Oregon Historical Quarterly. 108 (3): 63–74. doi:10.1353/ohq.2007.0035. S2CID 165536237.
- Helquist, Michael (2015). ""Criminal Operations": The First Fifty Years of Abortion Trials in Portland, Oregon". Oregon Historical Quarterly. 116 (1): 6–39. doi:10.1353/ohq.2015.0065.
- Helquist, Michael (Summer, 2016). "Lewd, Obscene, and Indecent: The 1916 Portland Edition of Family Limitation," Oregon Historical Quarterly, 117:2.
- Soden, Kris and Michael Helquist, (Summer, 2016). "History Comic: Adventures in Family Limitation," Oregon Historical Quarterly, 117:2.
- Helquist, Michael (Summer, 2017). "Resistance, Dissent, and Punishment in WWI Oregon, Oregon Historical Quarterly, 118:2.

Books

- Faderman, Lillian (2000). To believe in women : what lesbians have done for America : a history (1st Mariner Books ed.). Boston: Houghton Mifflin. ISBN 0618056971.
- Helquist, Michael (2015). MARIE EQUI: Radical Politics and Outlaw Passions. Corvallis OR: Oregon State University Press. ISBN 978-0-87071-595-2.
- Kennedy, Kathleen (1999). Disloyal mothers and scurrilous citizens : women and subversion during World War I. Bloomington, Ind. [u.a.]: Indiana Univ. Press. ISBN 0253335655.
- Munk, Michael (2011). The Portland red guide : sites & stories of our radical past (2nd ed.). Portland, Or.: Ooligan Press. ISBN 978-1932010374.
- Polishuk, Sandy (2003). Sticking to the union an oral history of the life and times of Julia Ruuttila (1st ed.). New York: Palgrave Macmillan. ISBN 1403962405.
- Stone, Geoffrey R. (2004). Perilous times : free speech in wartime from the Sedition Act of 1798 to the war on terrorism (1st ed.). New York: W.W. Norton & Co. ISBN 0393058808.

Online Resources

- "Dr. Marie Diana Equi". Changing the Face of Medicine. National Library of Medicine. Archived from the original on November 17, 2004.
- Tania Hyatt Evenson. "Dr. Marie Equi's Office". The Oregon History Project. Oregon Historical Society.
- OHSU History of Medicine Lecture: KAJ Mackenzie, Marie Equi, and the Oregon Doctor Train: Portland's response to the 1906 San Francisco Earthquake'by Michael Helquist.
- Michael Helquist. "WWI Sedition Project: Resistance, Dissent, and Punishment in WWI Oregon."
