= Randy Shilts =

American journalist and writer (1951–1994)

- Shilts in 1987
- Born: August 8, 1951; Davenport, Iowa, U.S.
- Died: February 17, 1994 (aged 42); Guerneville, California, U.S.
- Education: University of Oregon
- Occupations: Journalist, author
- Spouse: Barry Barbieri
- Writing career
- Period: 1975–1993
- Genre: History
- Notable works: The Mayor of Castro Street; And the Band Played On; Conduct Unbecoming: Gays and Lesbians in the U.S. Military

Randy Shilts (August 8, 1951 – February 17, 1994) was an American journalist and author. After studying journalism at the University of Oregon, Shilts began working as a reporter for both The Advocate and the San Francisco Chronicle, as well as for San Francisco Bay Area television stations. In the 1980s, he was noted for being the first openly gay reporter for the San Francisco Chronicle.

His first book, The Mayor of Castro Street: The Life and Times of Harvey Milk, was a biography of LGBTQ+ activist Harvey Milk. His second book, And the Band Played On, chronicled the history of the AIDS epidemic. Despite some controversy surrounding the book in the LGBTQ+ community, Shilts was praised for his meticulous documentation of an epidemic that was little-understood at the time. It was later made into an HBO film of the same name in 1993. His final book, Conduct Unbecoming: Gays and Lesbians in the US Military from Vietnam to the Persian Gulf, examined discrimination against lesbians and gays in the military.

Shilts garnered several accolades for his work. He was honored with the 1988 Outstanding Author award from the American Society of Journalists and Authors, the 1990 Mather Lectureship at Harvard University, and the 1993 Lifetime Achievement Award from the National Lesbian and Gay Journalists' Association. Diagnosed with HIV in 1985, Shilts died of an AIDS-related illness in 1994 at the age of 42.

== Early life ==
Born August 8, 1951, in Davenport, Iowa, Shilts grew up in Aurora, Illinois, with four brothers in a conservative, working-class family. His father, Bud, sold prefabricated homes. His mother, Norma, raised the children as Methodists. Norma was an alcoholic who frequently beat Randy when he was young.

In high school, Shilts founded a local chapter for Young Americans for Freedom. He majored in journalism at the University of Oregon, where he worked on the student newspaper, the Oregon Daily Emerald, as managing editor. While an undergraduate he came out publicly as gay, and ran for student office with the slogan "Come out for Shilts." He became the leader of the Eugene Gay People's Alliance. Randy Shilts was one of the first openly gay journalists to write for a major US newspaper. His writing focused on LGBTQ+ issues, including the struggle for gay rights.

== Journalism ==
Shilts graduated near the top of his class in 1975, but as an openly gay man, he struggled to find full-time employment in what he characterized as the homophobic environment of newspapers and television stations at that time. Shilts wrote for gay news magazine The Advocate but quit in 1978 after publisher David Goodstein began requiring employees to participate in EST; Shilts later wrote an exposé of Goodstein's brand of EST, the Advocate Experience. Shilts also says The Advocate was a "publication that had all these dirty classified ads in it. That I couldn't send the publication to my parents that I worked for because it was all filled up with 'Gay white man wants somebody to piss on', you know?" He subsequently worked as a freelance journalist until he was hired as a national correspondent by the San Francisco Chronicle in 1981, becoming "the first openly gay reporter with a gay 'beat' in the American mainstream press." AIDS, the disease that would later kill him, first came to nationwide attention that same year and soon Shilts devoted himself to covering the unfolding story of the disease and its medical, social, and political ramifications. During the early years of the AIDS crisis, he denounced San Francisco's gay leaders as "inept" and "a bunch of jerks", accusing them of hiding the emerging epidemic. In 1984, Shilts controversially supported closing the city's gay bathhouses.

== Books ==
In addition to his extensive journalism, Shilts wrote three books. His first book, The Mayor of Castro Street: The Life and Times of Harvey Milk, is a biography of openly gay San Francisco politician Harvey Milk, who was assassinated by a political rival, Dan White, in 1978. The book broke new ground, being written at a time when "the very idea of a gay political biography was brand-new."

Shilts's second book, And the Band Played On: Politics, People, and the AIDS Epidemic, published in 1987, won the Stonewall Book Award and would sell over 700,000 copies by 2004. The book made Shilts a trusted commentator on AIDS, to the point that he was the closing speaker at 1989's Fifth International AIDS Conference in Montreal. And the Band Played On is an extensively researched account of the early days of the AIDS epidemic in the United States. The book was translated into seven languages, and was later made into an HBO film of the same name in 1993, with many prominent actors in starring or supporting roles, including Matthew Modine, Richard Gere, Anjelica Huston, Phil Collins, Lily Tomlin, Ian McKellen, Steve Martin, and Alan Alda, among others. The film earned twenty nominations and nine awards, including the 1994 Emmy Award for Outstanding Made for Television Movie.

His last book, Conduct Unbecoming: Gays and Lesbians in the US Military from Vietnam to the Persian Gulf, which examined discrimination against lesbians and gays in the military, was published in 1993. Shilts and his assistants conducted over a thousand interviews while researching the book, the last chapter of which Shilts dictated from his hospital bed.

Shilts saw himself as a literary journalist in the tradition of Truman Capote and Norman Mailer. Undaunted by a lack of enthusiasm for his initial proposal for the Harvey Milk biography, Shilts reworked the concept, as he later said, after further reflection:

I read Hawaii by James Michener. That gave me the concept for the book, the idea of taking people and using them as vehicles, symbols for different ideas. I would take the life-and-times approach and tell the whole story of the gay movement in this way, using Harvey as the major vehicle.

== Criticism and praise ==
Although Shilts was applauded for bringing public attention to gay civil rights issues and the AIDS crisis, he was also harshly criticized (and spat upon on Castro Street) by some in the gay community for calling for the closure of gay bathhouses in San Francisco to slow the spread of AIDS. Fellow Bay Area journalist Bob Ross called Shilts "a traitor to his own kind". In a note included in The Life and Times of Harvey Milk, Shilts expressed his view of a reporter's duty to rise above criticism:

I can only answer that I tried to tell the truth and, if not be objective, at least be fair; history is not served when reporters prize trepidation and propriety over the robust journalistic duty to tell the whole story.

Shilts's tenacious reporting was highly praised by other gay and straight members of the public who saw him as "the pre-eminent chronicler of gay life and spokesman on gay issues". Shilts was honored with the 1988 Outstanding Author award from the American Society of Journalists and Authors, the 1990 Mather Lectureship at Harvard University, and the 1993 Lifetime Achievement Award from the National Lesbian and Gay Journalists' Association.

In 1999, the Department of Journalism at New York University ranked Shilts's AIDS reporting for the Chronicle between 1981 and 1985 as number 44 on a list of the top 100 works of journalism in the United States in the 20th century.

== Illness and death ==
Although Shilts recounted to The New York Times in 1993 that he had declined to be told the results of his HIV test until he had completed the writing of And the Band Played On, concerned that the 1987 test result would interfere with his objectivity as a writer, he had stated in a separate interview that he had known he was HIV positive since 1985.

In 1992, Shilts became ill with Pneumocystis pneumonia and suffered a collapsed lung; the following year, he was diagnosed with Kaposi's sarcoma. In a New York Times interview in the spring of 1993, Shilts observed, "HIV is certainly character-building. It's made me see all of the shallow things we cling to, like ego and vanity. Of course, I'd rather have a few more T-cells and a little less character." Despite being effectively homebound and on oxygen, he was able to attend the Los Angeles screening of the HBO film version of And the Band Played On in August 1993. Shilts died at 42 on February 17, 1994, at Davies Medical Center in San Francisco, California. He was survived by his partner, Barry Barbieri; his mother; and his brothers. His brother Gary had conducted a commitment service for the couple the previous year. After a funeral service at Glide Memorial Church, Shilts was buried at Redwood Memorial Gardens in Guerneville; his longtime friend, Daniel R. Yoder (1952–1995), was later buried alongside him.

== Legacy ==
Shilts bequeathed 170 cartons of papers, notes, and research files to the local history section of the San Francisco Public Library. At the time of his death, he was planning a fourth book, examining homosexuality in the Roman Catholic Church. As a fellow reporter put it, despite an early death, in his books Shilts "rewrote history. In doing so, he saved a segment of history from extinction." Historian Garry Wills wrote of And the Band Played On, "This book will be to gay liberation what Betty Friedan was to early feminism and Rachel Carson's Silent Spring was to environmentalism." NAMES Project founder Cleve Jones described Shilts as "a hero" and characterized his books as "without question the most important works of literature affecting gay people."

After his death, his longtime friend and assistant Linda Alband explained the motivation that drove Shilts: "He chose to write about gay issues for the mainstream precisely because he wanted other people to know what it was like to be gay. If they didn't know, how were things going to change?" In 1998, Shilts was memorialized in the Hall of Achievement at the University of Oregon School of Journalism, honoring his refusal to be "boxed in by the limits that society offered him. As an out gay man, he carved a place in journalism that was not simply groundbreaking but internationally influential in changing the way the news media covered AIDS." A San Francisco Chronicle reporter summed up the achievement of his late "brash and gutsy" colleague:

Perhaps because Shilts remains controversial among some gays, there is no monument to him. Nor is there a street named for him, as there are for other San Francisco writers such as Jack Kerouac and Dashiell Hammett. ... Shilts's only monument is his work. He remains the most prescient chronicler of 20th century American gay history.

In 2006, Reporter Zero, a half-hour biographical documentary about Shilts featuring interviews with friends and colleagues, was produced and directed by filmmaker Carrie Lozano. In 2014, Shilts was one of the inaugural honorees in the Rainbow Honor Walk, a walk of fame in San Francisco's Castro neighborhood that recognizes LGBTQ people who have "made significant contributions in their fields."

Shilts was the subject of a 2019 biography, The Journalist of Castro Street: The Life of Randy Shilts by Andrew E. Stoner, released May 30, 2019, from the University of Illinois Press. In June 2019, Shilts was one of the inaugural fifty American "pioneers, trailblazers, and heroes" inducted to the National LGBTQ Wall of Honor within the Stonewall National Monument in New York City's Stonewall Inn.

In 2024, author Michael G. Lee published When the Band Played On, a biography of Shilts, which Kirkus Reviews called "A nuanced portrait of a journalist and activist who sacrificed all while sounding a pandemic alarm." About the biography, Lee stated, "I think that he has a very substantial and complicated legacy. And I think that that legacy still plays out today. And I'm hoping that with this book it captures more of that complexity in a way that actually portrays the full human that he was."

In 2026, a biographical graphic novel, Bitter Pill: Randy Shilts and the Dawn of the HIV/AIDS Epidemic, written by Clément Xavier and illustrated by Héloïse Chochois, was published by Abrams Books. Originally in French, it was translated into English by Christopher Bradley.

== Bibliography ==
- Familiar Faces, Hidden Lives: The Story of Homosexual Men in America Today, by Howard J. Brown, M.D., Introduction by Randy Shilts, 1976 (ISBN 0-156-30120-2)
- The Mayor of Castro Street: The Life and Times of Harvey Milk, 1982 (ISBN 0-312-52331-9)
- And the Band Played On: Politics, People, and the AIDS Epidemic, 1987 (ISBN 0-613-29872-1)
- Conduct Unbecoming: Gays and Lesbians in the U.S. Military, 1993 (ISBN 0-312-34264-0)
