= Conduct Unbecoming: Gays and Lesbians in the U.S. Military =

1993 book by Randy Shilts

Conduct Unbecoming: Lesbians and Gays in the US Military
- Cover of the first edition
- Author: Randy Shilts
- Language: English
- Subject: Sexual orientation and gender identity in the United States military
- Published: 1993
- Publication place: United States
- Pages: 832
- ISBN: 978-0449909171

Conduct Unbecoming: Lesbians and Gays in the U.S. Military from Vietnam to the Persian Gulf War is a 1993 book by American journalist Randy Shilts, in which the author traces the participation of gay and lesbian personnel from the Revolutionary War to the late 20th century.

The book was well received in a review in the Los Angeles Times which described it as "gripping reading" and "an irrefutable indictment of unconscionable government behavior in a cause that the military seems still unable to explain".

== See also ==
- Don't ask, don't tell
- Sexual orientation in the United States military
- Sexual orientation and gender identity in the United States military
- Sexual orientation and gender identity in military service
- Bibliography of works on the United States military and LGBT+ topics
