= Dick Pabich =

American gay rights activist (1955–2000)

- Born: Richard William Paul Pabich; August 23, 1955; Beaver Dam, Wisconsin, U.S.
- Died: January 1, 2000 (aged 44), AIDS; San Francisco, California, U.S.
- Known for: Campaign manager and legislative aide to Harvey Milk, LGBT rights activism

Richard William Paul Pabich (August 23, 1955 – January 1, 2000) was an American gay rights activist best known for his role as a campaign manager and friend to Harvey Milk.

== Biography ==
Pabich was born in Beaver Dam, Wisconsin, the eldest child of Francis and Rosemary Pabich. He came to the Castro district of San Francisco, California during the 1970s amid a migration of gay and bisexual men. Pabich came out to his parents at Harvey Milk's request, as Milk asked gays across the country to come out to their friends and families to show that nearly everyone knew a gay person.

Pabich was instrumental to Milk's career as an activist and politician. Pabich helped to organize and manage Milk's campaigns for public office from 1974 to 1977 and his influence was widely in evidence after Milk was elected to the San Francisco Board of Supervisors in 1977. Pabich earned a reputation as an aggressive, charming and savvy political strategist many would seek for advice. Pabich served as a legislative aide to Milk until Milk's assassination in November 1978.

Pabich was one of the founders of the Harvey Milk Lesbian, Gay, Bisexual, Transgender Democratic Club in 1976. With the onset of the AIDS epidemic, the Milk Club was an early advocate of closing down the city's gay bathhouses. The club also created some of the earliest safe sex education materials in the United States.

Pabich was the campaign manager for Harry Britt, who was appointed to succeed Milk following his assassination. Pabich is also credited with helping the political careers of California Assemblywoman Carole Migden and United States Senator Barbara Boxer. Pabich managed several Northern California campaigns to defeat anti-gay state ballot initiatives in the late 1970s and early 1980s.

== Death and legacy ==
After his retirement from full-time politics and move to the East Bay, Pabich remained as an unofficial advisor to San Francisco Mayor Willie Brown on LGBTQ and AIDS issues. Pabich has been credited with playing a primary role in shaping AIDS policies across the United States.

Pabich died on January 1, 2000, at the age of 44. Mayor Brown ordered city flags to be flown at half-staff in San Francisco.

=== Portrayal in popular culture ===
In the 2008 feature film Milk, the role of Dick Pabich was played by Joseph Cross.
