= The Mayor of Castro Street =

1982 biography of Harvey Milk by author Randy Shilts

- Cover of the first edition
- Author: Randy Shilts
- Language: English
- Subject: Harvey Milk
- Published: 1982 (St. Martin's Press)
- Publication place: United States
- Media type: Print
- Pages: 400 (2008 edition)
- ISBN: 978-0312560850

The Mayor of Castro Street is a 1982 biography of Harvey Milk, written by Randy Shilts.

== Critical reception ==
Kirkus Reviews wrote that "Shilts' interwoven account of the emergence of San Francisco as a gay mecca—and the accompanying rise in gays' political clout—is first-rate."

== Adaptations ==
- In April 2007, Participant Media closed a deal with Warner Independent to turn the book into a film. However, the film appears to have stalled in "development hell", as no further news about development, casting or production has emerged. The intended adaptation was unrelated to the Academy Award–winning fictional film about Harvey Milk's life, Milk, or to an earlier documentary, The Times of Harvey Milk.
- In 2009, Audible.com produced an audio version of The Mayor of Castro Street, narrated by Marc Vietor, as part of its Modern Vanguard line of audiobooks.
