= National News Council =

The National News Council (NNC) was a non-profit media watchdog organization. It investigated complaints of media bias and unfair reporting. The NNC formed in 1973 with a grant from the Twentieth Century Foundation, the Markle Foundation and other sources. The Council was composed of 15 members, nine members of the general public and six journalists.

Compliance and cooperation with the NNC was entirely voluntary on the part of news organizations. The Council had no punitive powers. Its only power was that of publicity, drawing attention to media bias in hopes of the media's taking steps to acknowledge and correct it. Some media outlets were more willing to cooperate with NNC than others. CBS News under president Richard Salant notably supported the Council, including Salant's serving as NNC chairman, but journalists within CBS itself, including Walter Cronkite, did not. Abe Rosenthal of The New York Times was said to have taken some pride in refusing to cooperate with the NNC, saying "I am against regulation of the press, including self regulation except within each individual newspaper or broadcast station." The NNC heard a total of 242 formal complaints during its tenure.

The NNC announced in 1984 that it was dissolving. In the years since its dissolution, there have been periodic calls for its revival. General William Westmoreland, following the end of his protracted libel suit against CBS, called for the formation of an NNC-like body in 1985. Journalists who have since supported the reforming of the NNC have included William F. Buckley, Mike Wallace and Walter Cronkite (both in reversal of earlier opposition) and Murray Seeger. As of 2005, three states, Minnesota, Hawaii and Washington, had state-level news councils.

== List of NNC Chairmen ==
- Roger Traynor
- Stanley Fuld
- Norman Isaacs (1977–1982)
- Lucy Wilson Benson
- Edward W. Barrett
- Richard Salant (1983–1984)
