= Castro Sweep =

1989 police riot in San Francisco

- A group of police, armed with batons, arrest a civilian pinned to the ground of the sidewalk
- Date: October 6, 1989
- Location: Castro District, San Francisco, California, United States
- Type: Unlawful Assembly
- Cause: Police opposition to ACT UP protest
- Injuries: 14 (10 protestors, 4 police officers)
- Arrests: 53

The Castro Sweep was a police riot that occurred in the Castro District of San Francisco on the evening of October 6, 1989. The riot, by about 200 members of the San Francisco Police Department (SFPD), followed a protest held by ACT UP, a militant direct action group responding to the concerns of people with AIDS.

Earlier that day, members of ACT UP had marched from the Federal Building to the Castro District to protest the United States government's actions during the ongoing AIDS pandemic. During the march, police officers made several arrests. After the march ended at the intersection of Castro and Market Street, more protestors and onlookers met and staged sit-ins and die-ins. At around 8 p.m., the police declared the gathering an unlawful assembly and began to clear the streets. By 10 p.m., the police had withdrawn from the area and protestors later dispersed. Fifty-three people were arrested, while 14, including four officers, were injured.

In the aftermath of the sweep, LGBT news media coverage compared the event to the 1969 Stonewall riots, another notable instance of violent confrontation between police and members of the LGBT community. San Francisco Police Chief Frank Jordan responded to the sweep by suspending, demoting, or reassigning officers who had been involved, while San Francisco Mayor Art Agnos called the event "unacceptable" and urged victims to file complaints with the SFPD's Office of Citizens Complaints. In later lawsuits, the city paid out about $200,000 to victims in settlements.

== Background ==
The California city of San Francisco has historically been a center of LGBT culture in the United States and has a large LGBT community. Notable gay villages in the city have included the area along Polk Street, Tenderloin, and the Castro District. The city also has a history of violent confrontations between members of the LGBT community and the San Francisco Police Department (SFPD), with notable examples including the Compton's Cafeteria riot in 1966 and the White Night riots in 1979. During the 1980s, the city's LGBT community was severely affected by the AIDS pandemic, which disproportionately affected men who have sex with men. During this decade, in view of what many LGBT activists saw as a lack of response from the federal government of the United States and other public bodies, several support and advocacy groups for people with AIDS were established, including the Gay Men's Health Crisis and the AIDS Coalition to Unleash Power (ACT UP). Throughout the late 1980s, ACT UP led several large-scale protests and demonstrations to both draw attention to the AIDS crisis and to pressure governments to contribute more towards combatting the disease.

== ACT UP protest ==
=== March through San Francisco ===
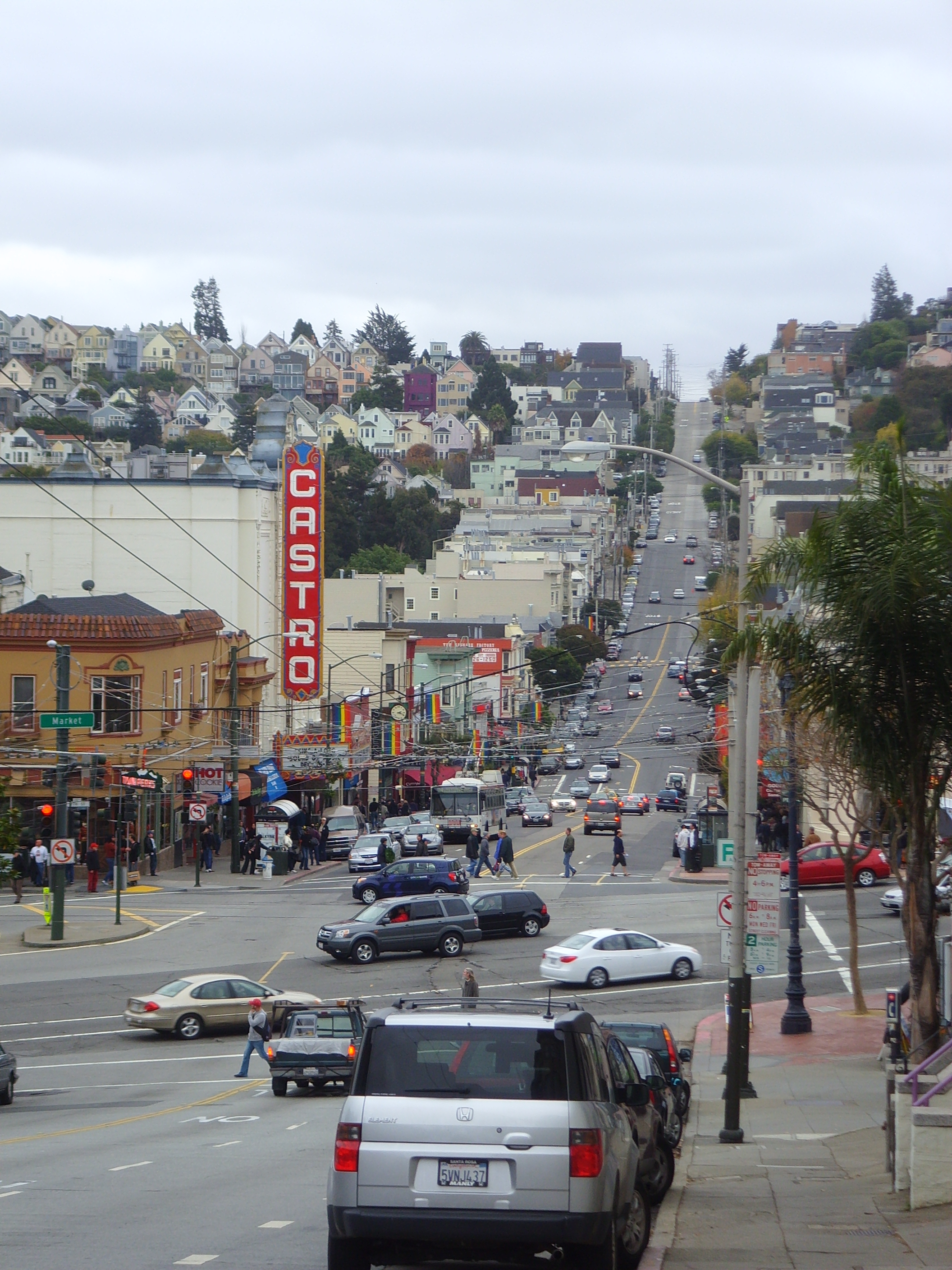
The intersection of Castro Street and Market Street in 2009

On Friday, October 6, 1989, ACT UP activists in San Francisco organized a march through the city to protest government inaction with regards to the AIDS pandemic. It was part of a nationwide day of protest conducted by ACT UP, and one of several protest activities conducted by the organization that year. In San Francisco, the march was planned to start at the Federal Building in the city's Civic Center and travel to Harvey Milk Plaza at the intersection of Castro and Market Street in the Castro District. Along the way, the protestors would make stops at the City Hall and the San Francisco Mint. Over one hundred people were present at the beginning of the march, (Note: Sources vary as to how many individuals participated in the march. In a 2009 article for the Bay Area Reporter, journalist Matthew S. Bajko states that Gerard Koskovich, a journalist who was present at the march, stated that about 150 people were present. However, in a 2002 article on the event, Koskovich stated that there were about 250 people who had gathered at the Federal Building. Additionally, an article published in Outweek on October 29, 1989, says, "Several hundred demonstrators gathered" at the Federal Building.) which commenced around 5 p.m.

In previous ACT UP demonstrations, the SFPD would typically assign a small number of officers to aid in traffic control and ensure the protestor's safety, but during the October 6 march, the police presence was much greater than it had been at prior events. Shortly after leaving the plaza of the Federal Building and beginning the march to the Castro District, many officers on foot and several on police motorcycles began to follow along with the marchers. Additionally, the police brought several police vans with them. According to a march participant, while in previous marches the police would close off a single lane to traffic, the police this time ordered the marchers to keep only to the sidewalk. The police made their first arrest of the day about one block from the Federal Building when Bill Haskell, the tactical coordinator and police liaison for the ACT UP protestors, walked into the street to talk to the officers. He was thrown to the ground and handcuffed before being taken into a police van and charged with resisting arrest and blocking the street. According to historian Emily K. Hobson, the arrest of one of the march's coordinators was a police tactic that "weakened [the] marchers' ability to communicate with one another and to respond to officers' presence". Police continued to strictly enforce the sidewalk rules for the duration of the march, which lasted for 30 city blocks, with many marchers chanting, "First Amendment under attack! What do we do? ACT UP! Fight back!" About halfway through the march, organizers stopped for a brief address to the protestors, reminding them of the AIDS-related goal of the protest and to continue in spite of the police's actions.

=== Gathering at Castro and Market Streets ===
The march ended around 7 p.m. as the protestors approached the intersection of Castro and Market streets. During other ACT UP marches, it had been customary for a brief gathering to be held at the intersection, with organizers giving brief speeches and protestors chanting while some police officers would direct traffic on foot. However, when the march finally reached the intersection, there were several hundred police officers present. According to Gerard Koskovich, a journalist present during the march, "When I got there I saw the single largest mass of San Francisco police officers I had ever seen at that point. The entire intersection of Castro and Market streets was filled with officers standing in rank". The police blocked the protestors from assembling at the intersection and redirected them along Castro Street, where about fifty protestors joined hands in a sit-in. Additionally, twenty protestors staged a die-in on the street. Despite the police presence, Koskovich and many other protestors did not think that there would be a serious confrontation with the police, as there had not been a violent largescale confrontation between police and LGBT individuals in the Castro District since the White Night riots about a decade ago.

As the protesting continued, more onlookers and other participants arrived, with the number of people present swelling to around 500 or 600. By this time, the focus of the protesting activity had shifted to the intersection of Castro and 17th Street, where several protestors locked arms and waited to be arrested. Additionally, many protestors had begun spray-painting parts of the road with body outlines as an homage to the NAMES Project AIDS Memorial Quilt, which, at the time, was headquartered about two blocks away. They also added slogans, such as "Profits=Death" and "Black People Die Faster". During this time, some protestors also began chanting, "SFPD racist, sexist, anti-gay. SFPD go away". According to Koskovich, the point where things turned violent began when someone knocked over a parked police motorcycle. Following this, an officer clubbed a protestor on their shoulder, and shortly thereafter other officers joined in and began to club protestors.

== Police response ==
At around 8 p.m., the police announced that the gathering was an unlawful assembly and began to march shoulder-to-shoulder down Castro Street towards 18th Street. Many of the officers wore riot gear, and several people on the streets were attacked by officers wielding nightsticks. Officers ordered individuals to remain inside nearby buildings and announced that anyone on the streets or sidewalks faced arrest. The Reverend Jim Schexnayder, the director of HIV/AIDS services for the Roman Catholic Diocese of Oakland, was on Castro Street at the time and was ordered into a nearby building by a SFPD officer. About 200 officers, representing approximately half of all SFPD officers on duty at the time, participated in the sweep, which covered about 7 city blocks. During the sweep, protestors began to chant the helmet badge number of a police officer who had assaulted a nineteen-year-old at the rally, rendering him unconscious and in need of several stitches. According to Koskovich, the police regrouped around 9 p.m. and continued their sweep. By about 10 p.m., police had left the area, with many of the protestors remaining on the streets. Following this, some ACT UP members gathered at the intersection of Castro and 18th and, after some cheering, left the area as well.

== Aftermath ==
The incident was the first police riot in the Castro District since the White Night riots of 1979. In total, SFPD officers arrested 53 individuals, while 14 people, including 4 police officers, were injured. Several of the protestors who were arrested were charged with assault. The following night, about 1,500 people took the streets of the Castro District as a show of resistance against the police actions the previous night. The same day, San Francisco Mayor Art Agnos released a statement to the Bay Area Reporter, a local LGBT newspaper, saying that the police's actions on October 6 were "unacceptable". He also urged individuals who were harassed or in some way victims of the police's actions to file formal complaints with the SFPD's Office of Citizens Complaints. On Sunday, October 8, the spray-painted slogans and body outlines were painted over by the police. The event was widely covered by the LGBT news media. The following week, the headline for the Bay Area Reporter read, "Castro Held Hostage". The New York City-based LGBT news magazine OutWeek reported on the event in several issues published later that month. In their coverage, they compare the event to the 1969 Stonewall riots, a watershed moment in LGBT history that saw patrons of a gay bar in New York City fight back against police officers during a police raid.

=== Police and city response ===
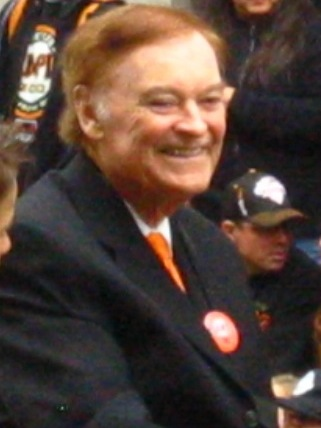
Frank Jordan was the San Francisco Chief of Police during the sweep.

Five days after the sweep, ACT UP issued a response in which they called for the resignation of the San Francisco Chief of Police Frank Jordan, a plan for public accountability, and disciplinary actions against officers who had been involved. The SFPD responded to the sweep by either suspending, demoting, or reassigning some of the officers who had been involved. Chief Jordan reprimanded Deputy Chief Frank Reed, who was head of the SFPD's Patrol Bureau, and Captain Richard Fife was moved to the Traffic Bureau. Jordan was also going to demote Deputy Chief Jack Jordan, his brother, but Jack resigned before he could do so. Captain Richard Cairns, who had been the tactical squad leader on the night of the sweep, was placed on administrative duty and later suspended from the SFPD for beating several protestors with his nightstick. Cairns objected to the suspension and later sued the city for its handling of his disciplinary case, arguing that he had acted in self-defense. The SFPD also made changes to its guidelines regarding their liaisons to the LGBT community after the event. According to the GLBT Historical Society, the disciplinary hearings "revealed the weakness of the city’s civilian police oversight system", and they said that protests from the LGBT community regarding police accountability for the sweep would continue for the next three years. Several protestors received payments from the city due to damages sustained in the sweep, as a group of citizens who had been present at the sweep later sued the city and settled out of court, with the city paying out about $200,000. (Note: Several articles published by the Bay Area Reporter state that the city paid out $200,000. However, a 2019 article published by the GLBT Historical Society gives the number as "some $250,000 in settlements".)

=== Later history ===
Since the event, the GLBT Historical Society has held several panel discussions about the sweep and its aftermath, including one on the 20th anniversary of the sweep in 2009 and another on the 30th anniversary in 2019. A vigil was held at the site of the sweep on the 25th anniversary in 2014. Speaking about the impact of the sweep in 2019, assistant editor John Ferrannini of the Bay Area Reporter wrote that "The Castro Sweep deepened divisions between the LGBT community and the police, which had already been frayed by decades of harassment in bars, the assassination of gay Supervisor Harvey Milk by former police officer and disgruntled ex-supervisor Dan White in 1978, and the subsequent White Night riots the following year". In 2014, when asked by the Bay Area Reporter if another incident such as the sweep could occur, San Francisco Police Chief Greg Suhr stated, "I would say very, very plainly 'Not on my watch.' That's a phrase we use in the police department when we say we're committed to something just absolutely not happening. ... We're a different police department".

Several historians have theorized about the rationale for the police action on the night of the sweep. According to Hobson, the sweep may have been in retaliation for a September 1989 event held by another AIDS-advocacy group at the San Francisco Opera. Additionally, it may have been caused by ACT UP's opposition to Mayor Agnos's plans for a new baseball stadium in the city. In a 2002 article, Koskovich stated that, six months prior to the sweep, ACT UP members had chased police officers out of the Castro District during the funeral of AIDS activist Terry Sutton, which may have led to a police reprisal on October 6.

== General and cited sources ==
- Bajko, Matthew S. (September 30, 2009). "20 years ago, police shut down the Castro". Bay Area Reporter. Archived from the original on June 6, 2022.
- "Editorial: Police and Pride". Bay Area Reporter. June 12, 2019. Archived from the original on May 15, 2021.
- "Arts Events Sept. 26 – Oct. 3, 2019". Bay Area Reporter. September 25, 2019. Archived from the original on October 1, 2019.
- Clews, Colin (2017). Gay in the 80s: From Fighting for our Rights to Fighting for our Lives. San Francisco: Troubador Press. ISBN 978-1-78803-674-0.
- Dowd, Katie (May 21, 2019). "Today marks 40 years since the White Night riots roiled San Francisco". San Francisco Chronicle. Hearst Communications. Archived from the original on June 20, 2021.
- Ferrannini, John (October 2, 2019). "LGBTQ History Month: Castro Sweep recalled amid police scrutiny". Bay Area Reporter. Archived from the original on April 23, 2022.
- Fitzsimmons, Tim (October 15, 2018). "LGBTQ History Month: The early days of America's AIDS crisis". NBC News. Archived from the original on June 8, 2022.
- "Remembering a Police Riot: The Castro Sweep of 1989". GLBT Historical Society. October 3, 2019. Archived from the original on May 12, 2022.
- Hemmelgarn, Seth (October 1, 2014). "Vigil to mark Castro Sweep 25th anniversary". Bay Area Reporter. Archived from the original on April 21, 2022.
- Hernandez, Lazaro (October 29, 1989). "ACT UP/SF Demo Ends in Police Violence & Arrests" (PDF). OutWeek (19): 13, 15.
- Hobson, Emily K. (2016). Lavender and Red: Liberation and Solidarity in the Gay and Lesbian Left. Oakland, California: University of California Press. ISBN 978-0-520-96570-6.
- Koskovich, Gerard (November 5, 1989). "San Francisco Journal: Stonewall for a New Generation" (PDF). OutWeek (20): 32–33, 65.
- Koskovich, Gerard (2002). "Remembering a Police Riot: The Castro Sweep of October 6, 1989". In Leyland, Winston (ed.). Out in the Castro: Desire, Promise, Activism. San Francisco: Leyland Publications. pp. 189–198. ISBN 978-0-943-59588-7.
- Latham, Ashley (December 15, 2018). "Looking Back: The AIDS Epidemic". San Francisco LGBT Community Center. Archived from the original on November 19, 2021.
- Levin, Sam (June 21, 2019). "Compton's Cafeteria riot: a historic act of trans resistance, three years before Stonewall". The Guardian. Archived from the original on June 5, 2022.
- Owen, Elliot (October 23, 2012). "History shows San Francisco has long been a gay mecca". Windy City Times. Archived from the original on June 8, 2022.
- Riemer, Matthew; Brown, Leighton (2019). We Are Everywhere: Protest, Power, and Pride in the History of Queer Liberation. Berkeley, California: Ten Speed Press. ISBN 978-0-399-58182-3.
