= Twin Peaks Tavern =

Gay bar in San Francisco, opened in 1935

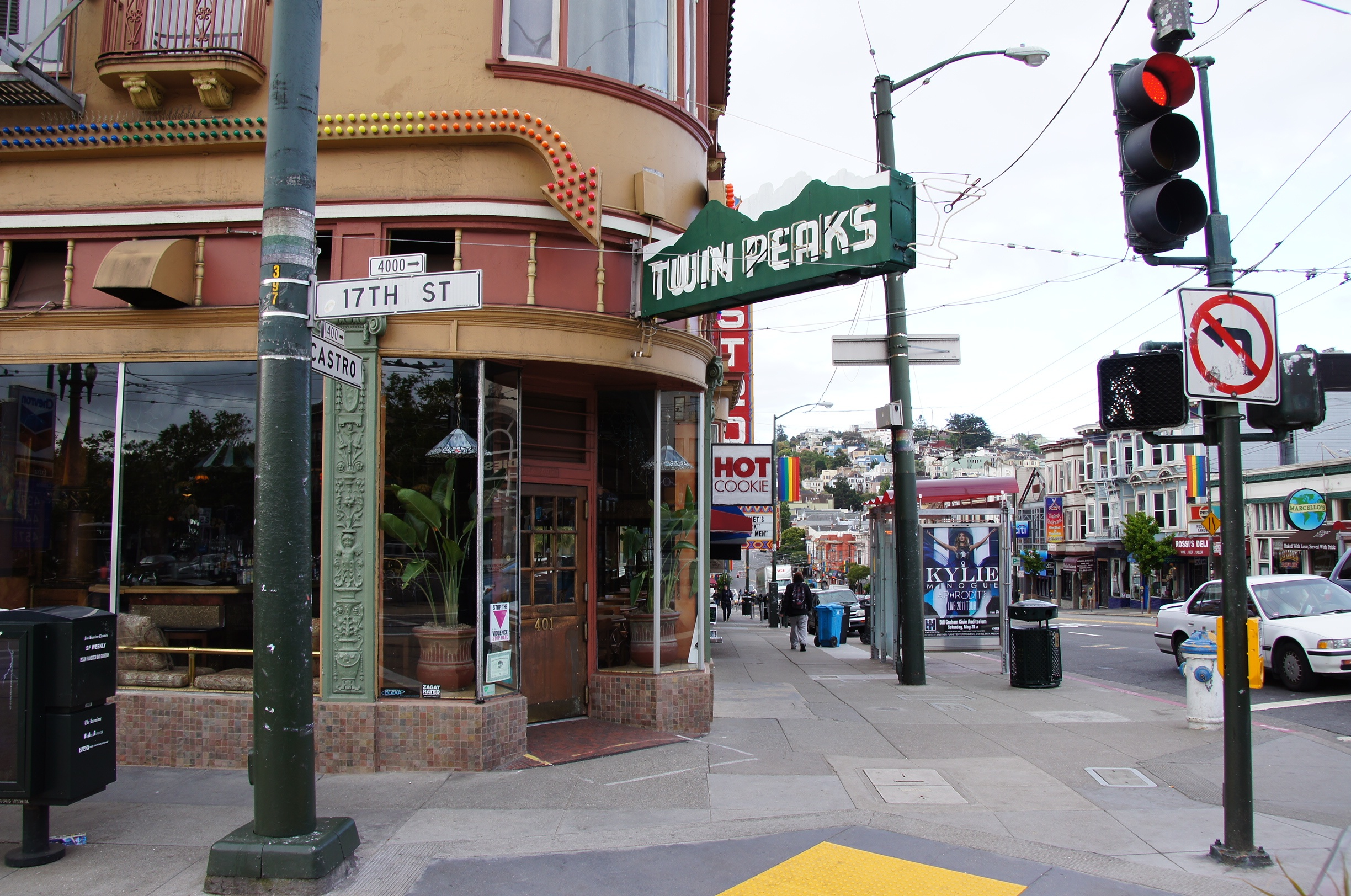

- Location within San Francisco County Location within California
- 37.763076°N 122.434955°W
- Location: 401 Castro Street, San Francisco, California, U.S.

San Francisco Designated Landmark
- Designated: February 6, 2013
- Reference no.: 264

Twin Peaks Tavern is an American historic gay bar. It first opened in 1935 and is located at 401 Castro Street in the Castro District in San Francisco, California. It is one of the most famous bars in the Castro and features prominent oversized windows that were unveiled in 1972, something uncommonly seen in older gay bars. It is located across the street from the Castro Station for Muni Metro, and near the F Market heritage streetcar line.

The tavern received San Francisco Designated Landmark status in February 6, 2013.

== History ==
The building was first constructed in 1883 (formerly at the address 3999-17th Street). It displays a 1923 Mediterranean revival-style façade. It sits on a lot that contains two buildings, located at the intersection of Castro Street and Market Street. In 1890s, the building was occupied by a saloon and cigar shop. The Twin Peaks Tavern had opened in 1935 as a regular Irish pub.

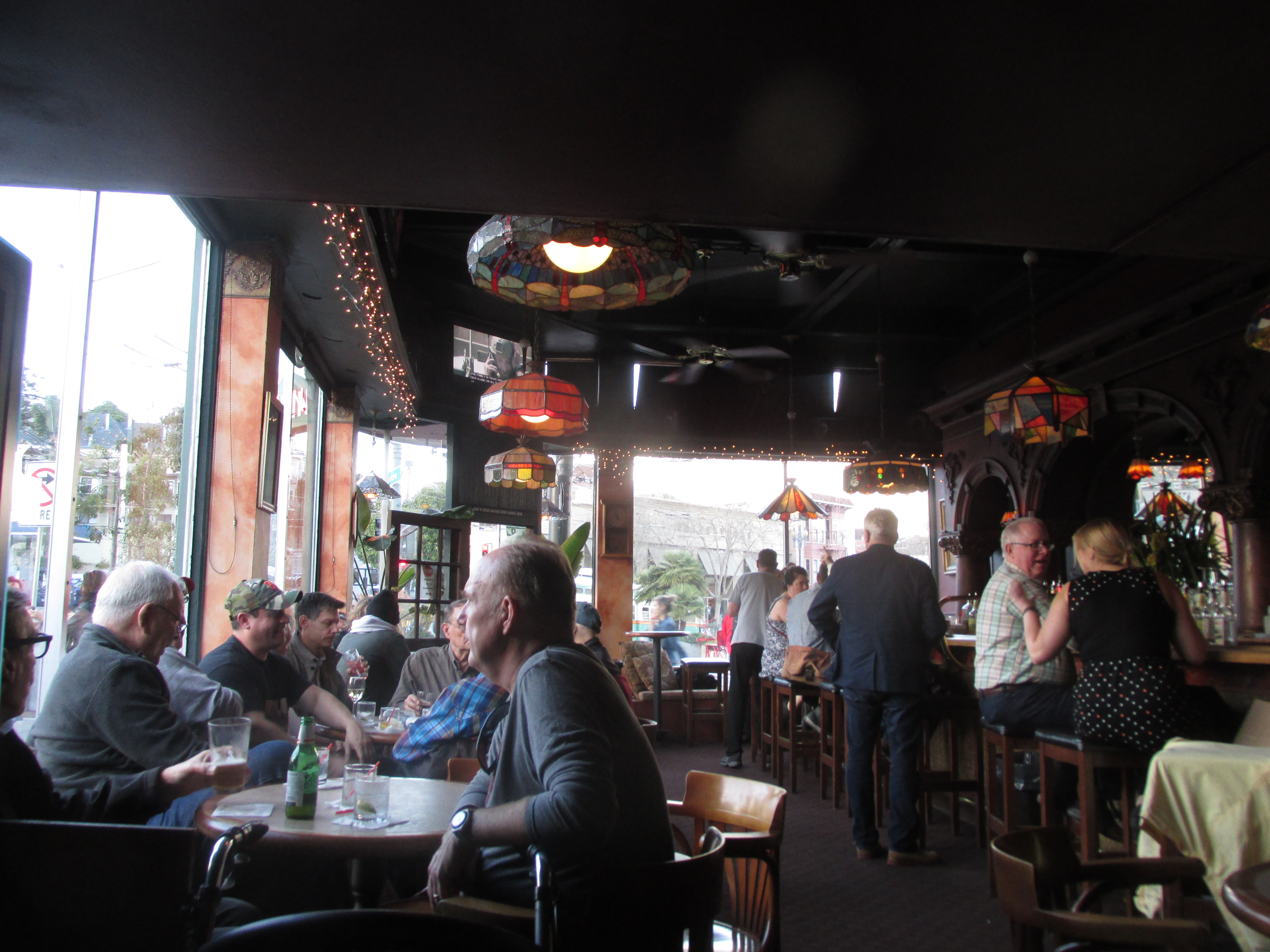
The interior of Twin Peaks Tavern (2015)

In 1972, the business was taken over by two lesbian friends Mary Ellen Cunha and Peggy Forster, who removed the window coverings a year later, making it believed to be the first gay bar which revealed its customers to the outside. Until then, most American gay bars and clubs had shuttered windows so outsiders couldn't see who was inside and thus apparently queer, something that could have led to job loss or social exclusion. The interior has a partial mezzanine; a U-shaped wooden bar; and a pre-Prohibition mirrored backbar.

In 2003, Cunha and Forster sold the Twin Peaks Tavern to Jeffrey Green and George Roehm, who had previously worked as bartenders at the establishment.

"Through The Windows" (2019; 56 minutes) is a documentary short film about the tavern, directed by Petey Barma and Bret Parker.

In 2020, the tavern was in danger of closing due to the COVID-19 pandemic; they launched a GoFundMe and the community was able to raise enough money for the tavern to survive.

On September 6, 2022, Queen Máxima of the Netherlands was received in the Twin Peaks Tavern, where she listened to the concerns of members of the LGBT community. Additionally she visited the Castro Theatre and the GLBT Historical Society.

== See also ==
- LGBT culture in San Francisco
- List of LGBTQ bars
- List of San Francisco Designated Landmarks
- Rainbow Honor Walk
- White Night Riots
