= Coming Up =

Coming Up may refer to:

- Coming Up (album), by Suede
- "Coming Up" (song), by Paul McCartney
- San Francisco Bay Times, LGBT newspaper previously named COMING Up!
- Coming Up (TV series), British TV series first shown 2003
