= Alfred E. Clarke Mansion =

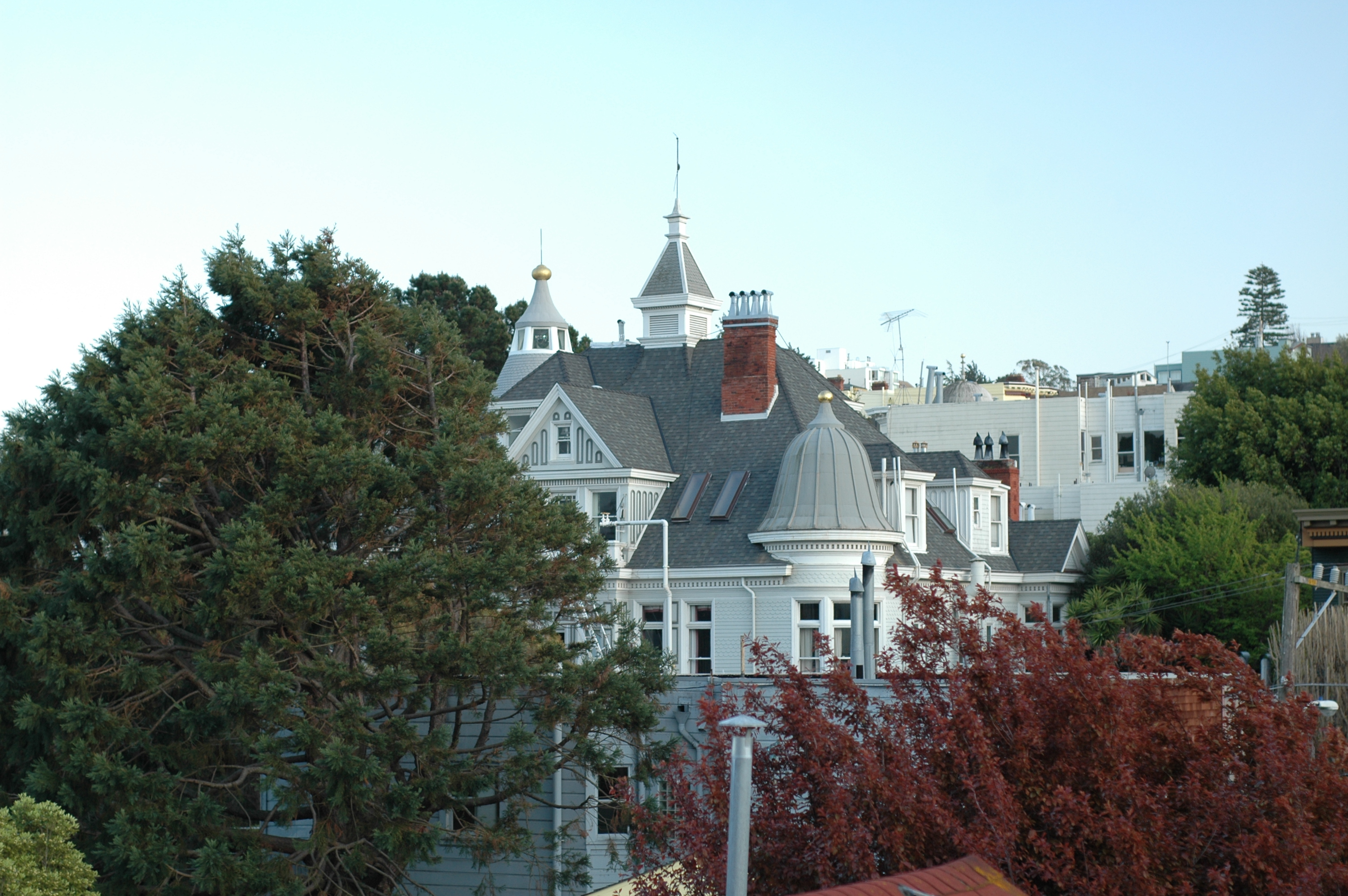
- The building in 2009

- Location within San Francisco
- 37.75961°N 122.43953°W
- Type: Mansion
- Location: 250 Douglass Street, San Francisco, California, USA

History
- Built: 1892
- Original use: Single-Family Residence (Hospital in early 1900s)

Site notes
- Area: Eureka Valley, Castro District
- Architect: Alfred E. Clarke
- Architectural style: Baroque Queen Anne

San Francisco Designated Landmark
- Official name: Alfred E. (Nobby) Clarke Mansion
- Designated: December 7, 1975
- Reference no.: 80

The Alfred E. Clarke Mansion, also known as the Caselli Mansion, Nobby Clarke's Castle and Nobby Clarke's Folly, is a mansion at 250 Douglass Street on the corner of Caselli Avenue in Eureka Valley, San Francisco, California. Built in 1891 by Alfred "Nobby" Clarke, it has been a hospital and is now an apartment building. It became a San Francisco Designated Landmark in 1975.

== Description ==
The house is a four-story structure in Baroque-Queen Anne style; it has several towers and the roof has bands of scalloped shingles alternating with plain. It stands on a site at the head of Eureka Valley and originally had 45 rooms; The interior features an impressive foyer with grand staircase, carved fireplaces, mantels, and wood paneling, and fine stained glass. Alfred "Nobby" Clarke, who had it built, is said to have based it on a French lakeside chateau whose plans he bought.

== History ==
Clarke, who came to San Francisco from Ireland as a cabin boy in 1850, had amassed a fortune of some $200,000 by dubious means while working for the police department from 1856 to 1887, for much of that time as clerk to the chief of police and later as the department's legal advisor. He bought the lot in 1890 and completed the house in 1892 for a reputed $100,000. Clarke engaged in an expensive legal feud with a neighbor over water sales, and soon after completing the house lost his fortune in a nationwide economic depression; in 1892 he declared himself insolvent after signing his real estate holdings over to his wife and a friend in an attempt to conceal them. He then brought a series of unsuccessful lawsuits against the city and his creditors and was repeatedly jailed before dying at age 69. He lost the house in 1896 when he defaulted on the mortgage; his wife had declined to live in the then largely rural area, preferring to remain on Nob Hill.

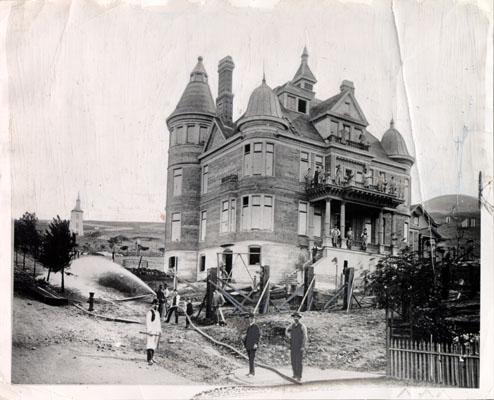
The mansion in the 1890s

The mansion was purchased by the California Medical College as a teaching hospital. The building subsequently became the Maclean Hospital and Sanitarium, headed by Donald Maclean, which taught eclectic medicine; in 1900 Law Keem earned a medical degree there, the first medical degree awarded to a Chinese person in San Francisco. The building was used for two more hospitals, including the California General Hospital in 1904. In August 1903, heiress Edith Irene Wolfskill, the daughter of John Wolfskill, had been a patient of California General Hospital and she escaped out a window before they could perform an operation on her (possibly a hysterectomy). The building may have been again used as a hospital during World War I.

Unlike many other Victorian mansions in San Francisco, it survived the 1906 earthquake and the subsequent fires. In 1909 it became the Victor Apartments, the first apartment building in the neighborhood, with 14 units. In World War II it was leased for employee housing by Standard Oil.

The Alfred E. Clarke mansion was designated San Francisco city landmark number 80 on December 7, 1975.
