= Kite Hill, San Francisco =

City park and natural area in San Francisco, California

Coordinates: 37°45′30″N 122°26′30″W

Kite Hill
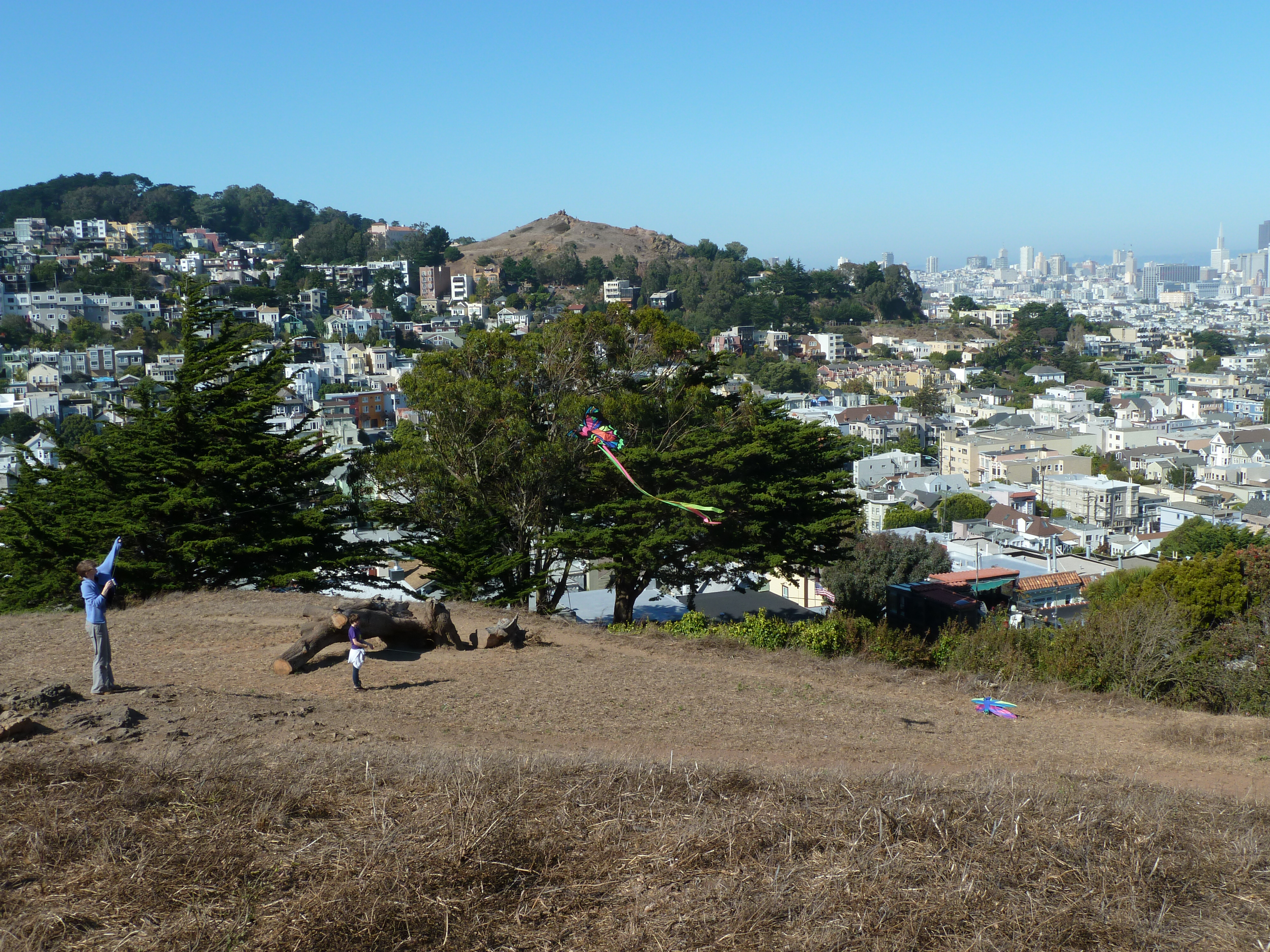
- Interactive map of Kite Hill
- Location: San Francisco
- Area: 2.87 acres (1.16 ha; 0.00448 mi^{2}; 0.0116 km^{2})
- Owned by: San Francisco Recreation & Parks Department
- Operated by: San Francisco Recreation & Parks Department
- Open: All year, 5 a.m. to Midnight

Kite Hill is a city park and natural area in the Castro district of San Francisco, California. At an elevation of 350 feet, the 2.87-acre (1.16 ha) park is named for its gusty winds. The natural area includes a panoramic view of San Francisco.

Kite Hill was purchased by the city and incorporated into the San Francisco Natural Areas Program in 1977.
