= Charles Gain =

American police official (1923–2018)

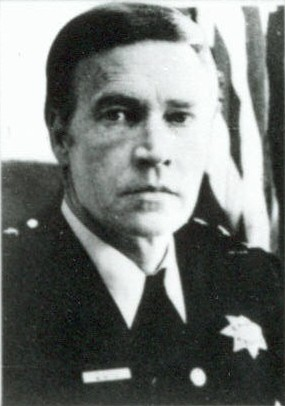
- Gain c. 1975
- Born: November 1, 1923; Hanford, California, U.S.
- Died: August 21, 2018 (aged 94); Morro Bay, California, U.S.
- Police career
- Department: San Francisco Police Department
- Rank: Chief (1975–1980)

Charles 'Charlie' Gain (November 1, 1923 – August 21, 2018) was an American police official, who served first as police chief for Oakland, California, then as chief in San Francisco in the 1970s. He was born in Hanford, California.

In 1975, Gain was appointed to run the San Francisco Police Department by Mayor George Moscone and served until 1980. After Gain began implementing reforms, such as switching police cars from their traditional black and white paint scheme to baby blue, the Police Officers Association held a no-confidence vote on him. After Moscone was assassinated in 1978, the union was influential in engineering Gain's replacement after the resulting White Night riots. He died from respiratory failure in August 2018 at the age of 94.
