= San Francisco Bay Times =

American LGBTQ newspaper

- Type: Biweekly newspaper
- Publisher: Betty Sullivan and Jennifer Viegas
- Editor: Betty Sullivan and Jennifer Viegas
- Founded: 1978
- Language: English
- Headquarters: San Francisco and Oakland, California
- Website: San Francisco Bay Times

The San Francisco Bay Times, the first LGBTQ newspaper founded jointly by gay men and women, launched in 1978 and remains one of the largest and oldest LGBTQ newspapers in Northern California. The business includes the 24/7 live-streaming Castro Street Cam that streams Harvey Milk Plaza and the Castro live to the world, serving as an emotional lifeline to LGBTQ people elsewhere, including internationally, who seek connection due to isolation in their regions. It also includes the LGBTQ news and events service "Betty's List," as well as "Harvey's List" and the "Bay Times List."

== History ==
In 1978, a collective of seven women and men joined to plan and produce the first issue of the San Francisco Bay Times. Meetings were held at founding co-publisher Bill Hartman's home located on Central Avenue in San Francisco. The collective included Hartman, co-publisher Roland Schembari, founding editor Randy Alfred, circulation manager Susan Calico, women's section editor Priscilla Alexander, and two others.

Contributors included many pioneering LGBTQ community leaders, such as Cleve Jones, Del Martin & Phyllis Lyon, Howard Wallace, and numerous others.

The first issue, which featured politician and LGBTQ activist Tom Ammiano on the cover, included this statement from the Bay Times staff that foreshadowed what many years later would be termed intersectionality: "The Bay Times will be a forum for dialogue. News coverage will report on inter-group relations, and editorial comment will forge links between our movements and those of racial minorities, feminists, rank-and-file labor, environmentalists, the disabled, the old, the young, and the poor."

=== Timeline ===
The following is a timeline of key dates in the San Francisco Bay Times’ history:

- February 14, 1978: “San Francisco Bay Times” was established with the California Secretary of State, with an entity mailing address of 150 Central Avenue in San Francisco.
- May 1, 1978: Inaugural issue was published, and it continued as a monthly print publication through July 1978. For a portion of 1978, an office was maintained at 613 Laguna Street in San Francisco.
- July 1978 through September 1979: Publication on hold to re-evaluate the business model and content structure of the print issue.
- October 1979: Re-introduced the print publication under the title Coming Up. It continued on a monthly publication schedule through March 1989.
- September 4, 1981: Coming Up was registered with the California Secretary of State. The mailing address for the business was 2120 Market Street #104 in San Francisco.
- 1981: Founding publishers Schembari and Hartman retired from the publication, and the ownership was changed to Kim Corsaro, who served as publisher from 1981 to 2011. Corsaro continued as editor and publisher of the publication as a bi-weekly from 1981 through July 2011, when she retired.
- August 12, 1983: The entity “San Francisco Bay Times, Inc.” was established with the California Secretary of State as part of the evolution of the business structure of the San Francisco Bay Times.
- April 1989: The name was changed back to the San Francisco Bay Times.
- 1990–1999: Maintained an office at 288 7th Street in the South of Market District.
- April 7, 2006: The limited liability company “Bay Times, LLC” was registered with the California Secretary of State as part of the ongoing evolution of the publication's business structure. The agent for the service of process was Kim Corsaro. The mailing address was P.O. Box 410386, San Francisco, CA 94038–01386.
- 2006: Introduced the website and began publishing content both online and in print.
- 2010: Due to a family commitment, publisher Corsaro operated the San Francisco Bay Times as a virtual business while commuting between Florida and San Francisco. The publication has since operated as a virtual business without a designated street address location.
- 2011: Kim Corsaro sold the paper to Sullivan Communications, Inc., which is owned by Betty L. Sullivan. Sullivan made a private ownership agreement with co-publisher/co-owner Jennifer L. Viegas.
- June 2018: The newspaper celebrates 40 years in publication.
- March 2020: Business in the city of San Francisco was dramatically restricted with the implementation of public health-related regulations addressing the COVID-19 pandemic. This resulted in a heavy loss of advertising due to necessary venue closures, event cancellations, and travel restrictions. The publication schedule of the paper was adjusted, fluctuating between the standard “print and online” formats and an abbreviated “online only” format for alternating issues.
- 2021: The publication schedule continues on the signature bi-weekly schedule and is honored as a Legacy Business. The Legacy Business program certifies businesses that have operated in San Francisco for 30 years or longer and have contributed to San Francisco's history and identity.

== Online Archives ==
The full text of issues of the paper's issues published since 2011 can be viewed on ISSUU (https://issuu.com/sfbt) and its online content can be viewed on the paper's website.

== See also ==
- LGBT culture in San Francisco
