= Castro Camera =

Coordinates: 37.759786°N 122.43468°W

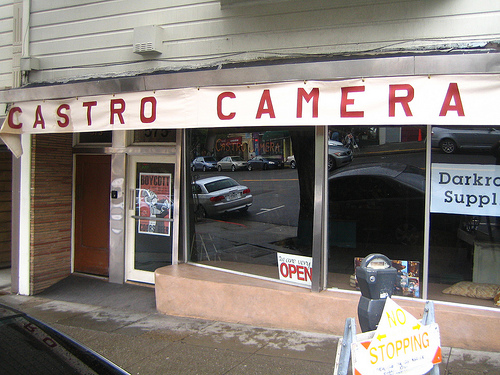
- Castro Camera storefront, as recreated for the 2008 film Milk
- Interactive map of the Castro Camera area

General information
- Location: 575 Castro Street, Castro District, San Francisco, California, United States of America
- Construction started: 1972

Castro Camera was a camera store in the Castro District of San Francisco, California, operated by Harvey Milk from 1972 until his assassination in 1978. During the 1970s the store became the center of the neighborhood's growing gay community, as well as campaign headquarters for Milk's various campaigns for elected office.

== History ==
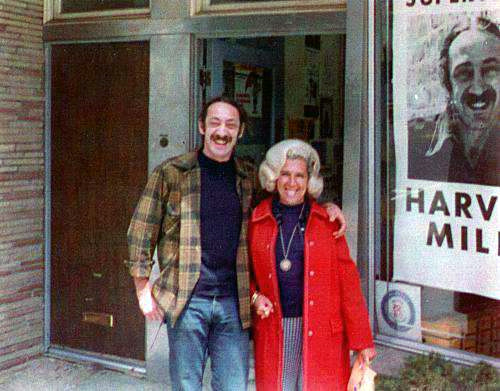
Harvey Milk, here with his sister-in-law in front of Castro Camera in 1973

Milk, an avid amateur photographer, was disappointed over a developer ruining a roll of film. With his then-partner, Scott Smith, Milk opened the store in 1972, using the last $1,000 of their savings. The store soon became a focus of the growing influx of young gay people, who were coming from across the US to the Castro, where their sexual orientation was accepted.

Beyond selling cameras and film, Milk turned the store into a social center, and a refuge for new arrivals. He also made it an official polling station for San Francisco elections. Because he was so well known for his civic involvement promoting gay businesses and gay consumers, Milk soon became known unofficially as the "Mayor of Castro Street". Daniel Nicoletta, the photographer best known for chronicling Milk and his times, first met Milk as a patron of the store, then later worked there as a store assistant and campaign worker. Another customer, Anne Kronenberg, who later became Milk's campaign manager, also met Milk at the store, and described her first impression of him as a "raving maniac". Other members of Milk's inner circle such as Cleve Jones and his speechwriter Frank Robinson met, befriended, and worked with Milk at the store.

== Post-closure ==
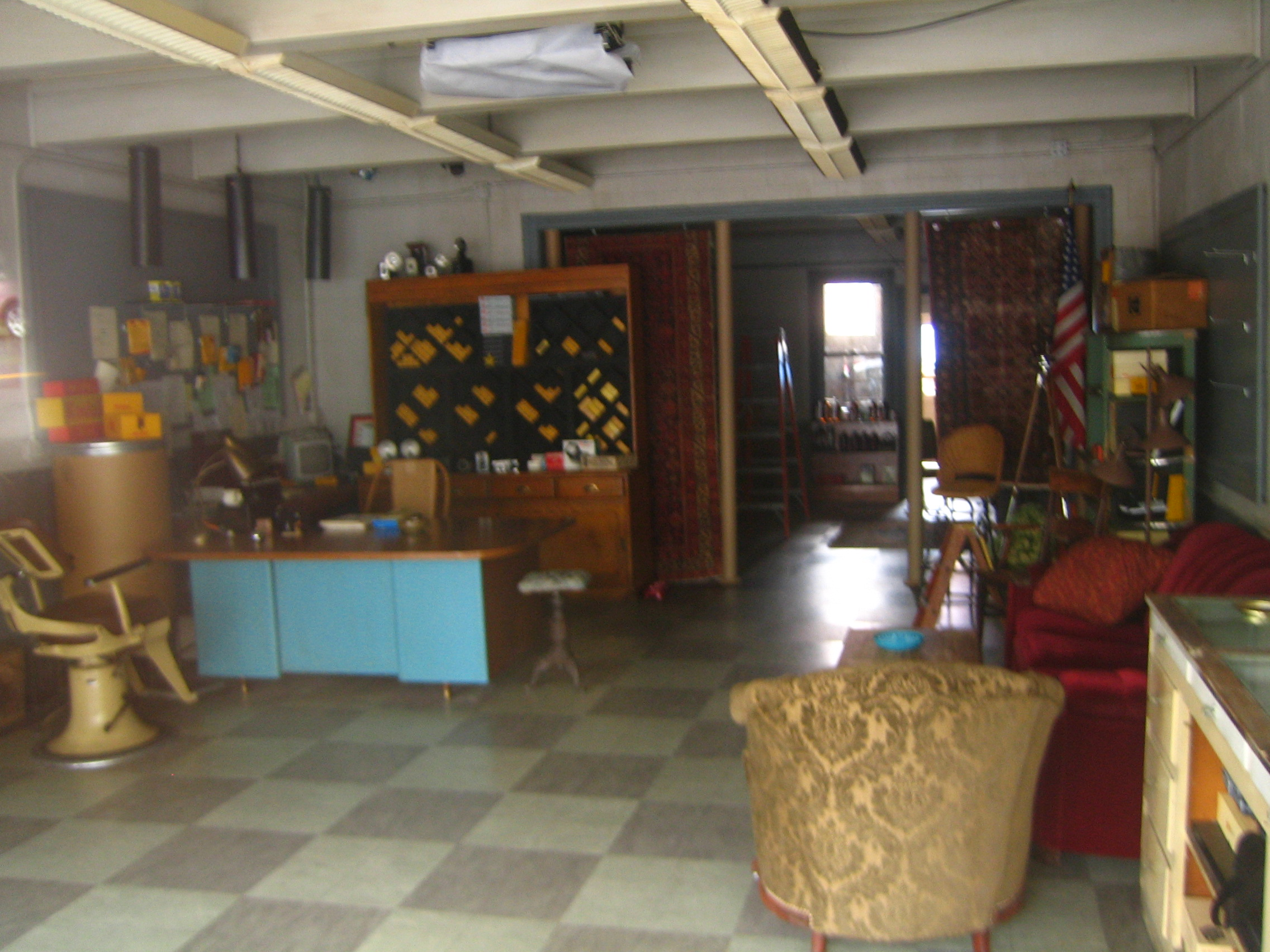
Castro Camera interior, as recreated for the film Milk

The location at 575 Castro Street, a Human Rights Campaign Store as of 2011, was recreated as a set for Milk, the biopic of Milk's life. The sparse set, carefully built to original detail including an old red couch and barber's chair, drew the attention of many local residents who remembered the original. The modern-day shop owner and film crew also described seeing a ghost at the store, whom they assumed to be Milk.

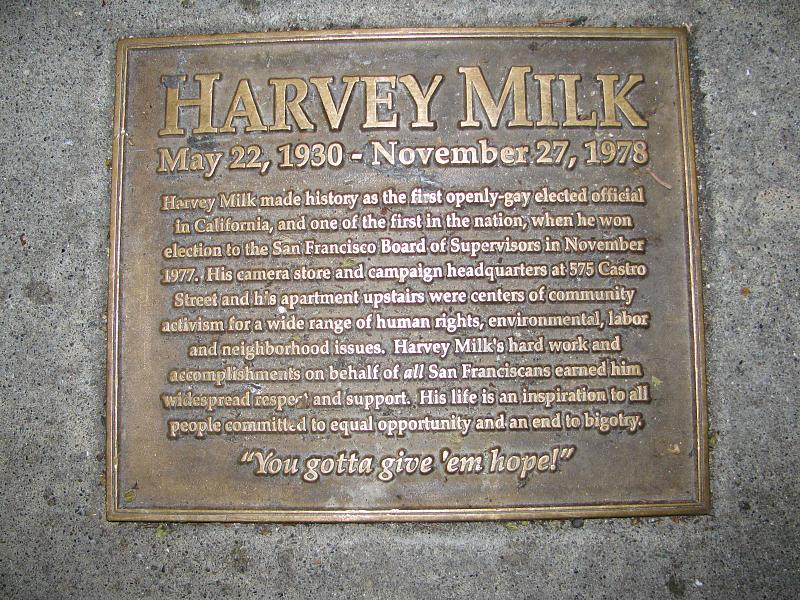
A memorial plaque outside of the former Castro Camera store

A metal plaque set into the sidewalk in front of the store memorializes Milk, and the location has been used as the stepping-off point for an annual memorial march on the date of his death.

Artifacts from Castro Camera, including Milk's barber chair, a collection of antique cameras that was displayed at the store and the front panel of the awning bearing the name of the shop, are preserved in the holdings of the GLBT Historical Society, a museum, archives and research center in San Francisco. The society displayed the camera collection in an exhibition it devoted to Milk in 2003, "Saint Harvey: The Life and Afterlife of a Modern Gay Martyr." In addition, the art director for Milk consulted the collection when creating props for the Castro Camera set.

In July 2022, an art gallery and events space named Queer Arts Featured opened in the former Castro Camera.
