= White Night riots =

1979 riots in San Francisco, California, US

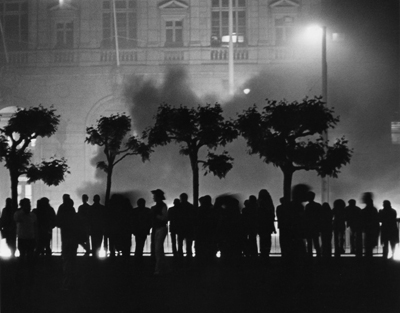
- Rioters outside San Francisco City Hall, May 21, 1979, reacting to the voluntary manslaughter verdict for Dan White
- Date: May 21, 1979
- Time: Evening
- Location: San Francisco, California, US
- Cause: Conviction of Dan White of voluntary manslaughter rather than first-degree murder for the Moscone–Milk assassinations
- Injuries: 140

The White Night riots were a series of violent events sparked by an announcement of a lenient sentencing of Dan White for the assassinations of George Moscone, the mayor of San Francisco, and of Harvey Milk, a member of the city's Board of Supervisors who was one of the first openly gay elected officials in the United States. The events took place on the night of May 21, 1979, in San Francisco. Earlier that day White had been convicted of voluntary manslaughter, the lightest possible conviction for his actions. The lesser conviction outraged the city's gay community, setting off the most violent reaction by gay Americans since the 1969 Stonewall riots in New York City.

The gay community of San Francisco had a longstanding conflict with the San Francisco Police Department. White's status as a former police officer intensified the community's anger at the SFPD. Initial demonstrations took place as a peaceful march through the Castro district of San Francisco. After the crowd arrived at the San Francisco City Hall, violence began. The events caused hundreds of thousands of dollars' worth of property damage to City Hall and the surrounding area, as well as injuries to police officers and rioters.

Several hours after the riot had been broken up, police made a retaliatory raid on a gay bar in San Francisco's Castro District. Many patrons were beaten by police in riot gear. Two dozen arrests were made during the course of the raid, and several people later sued the SFPD.

In the following days, gay leaders refused to apologize for the events of that night. This led to increased political power in the gay community, which culminated in the election of Mayor Dianne Feinstein to a full term the following November. In response to a campaign promise, Feinstein appointed a pro-gay Chief of Police, which increased recruitment of gay people in the police force and eased tensions.

== Background ==
=== Gay history of San Francisco ===
The American settlers who moved west toward California in the 18th and 19th centuries were largely male prospectors and miners. Events such as the California Gold Rush created a broadly male society in that region. Romantic friendships were common, and often tolerated. As San Francisco was settled the ratio of men to women remained disproportionately high, resulting in the growth of a culture that was more open-minded towards homosexuality. The city's notorious brothel district – named the Barbary Coast – earned the city a reputation as a lawless and amoral society leading to San Francisco becoming known as "Sodom by the Sea."

The end of Prohibition prompted the opening of several gay bars along North Beach. The most notable of these were the Black Cat where female impersonation shows became the main draw, and a lesbian bar known as Mona's.

During World War II, San Francisco became a major debarkation point for servicemen stationed in the Pacific Theater. The U.S. military, which was concerned about male homosexuality, had a policy of dismissing servicemen caught in known gay establishments with blue discharges. As many of these men faced ostracism from their communities and families, they chose to remain in the city. The number of men that remained was a significant factor in the creation of a homosexual community in San Francisco.

=== Gay activism in San Francisco ===
In 1951, the California Supreme Court affirmed in Stoumen v. Reilly the right of homosexuals to assemble peacefully. To assist homosexuals with legal problems, in 1951 labor activist Harry Hay started the Mattachine Foundation from his living room in Los Angeles. Two years later, the Mattachine Society had expanded to several cities through the organizational skills of Chuck Rowland and under the leadership of less radical leaders Ken Burns in Los Angeles, Hal Call in San Francisco, and Curtis Dewees, Joe McCarthy, and Tony Segura in New York, and Prescott Townsend of Boston. A few years later, Phyllis Lyon and Del Martin started the Daughters of Bilitis with six other women in San Francisco, initially to have a place to socialize without fear of harassment or arrest. Within a few years, both organizations learned of each other and grew to have similar goals: helping assimilate homosexuals into general society, working for legal reform to repeal sodomy laws, and assisting those who were arrested. Both groups were headquartered in San Francisco by 1957, where The Ladder was edited by Lyon and Martin while The Mattachine Review was edited by Hal Call. Both publications were printed by Call's Pan Graphic Press.

Police continued to arrest homosexuals in large numbers, routinely bringing paddy wagons to gay bars and arresting their patrons. Charges were usually dismissed, but those arrested often lost their anonymity when newspapers printed their names, addresses and places of employment. Officers also notified the employer and family of the accused, causing serious damage to their reputations.

In 1964, a New Year's Eve benefit event was held for the Council on Religion and the Homosexual. Police stood outside with large floodlights, and in an effort to intimidate took photographs of anyone entering the building. Later, several officers demanded that they be allowed inside. Three lawyers explained to them that under California law, the event was a private party and they could not enter unless they bought tickets. The lawyers were then arrested. Several ministers who were in attendance held a press conference the next morning, likening the SFPD to the Gestapo. Even the Catholic archbishop strongly condemned the actions of the police. In an attempt to reduce such harassment two officers were tasked with improving the police department's relationship with the gay community.

The Mattachine Society and Daughters of Bilitis promoted non-confrontational education for homosexuals and heterosexuals, hoping to prove that homosexuals were respectable and normal. Living beyond the mostly white, middle class scope of these groups was an active community of cross-dressers, hustlers, and "street queens" who worked primarily in the Tenderloin district of the city. After being denied service at Gene Compton's Cafeteria, a few activists picketed the restaurant in 1966. A few days later, early in the morning, the police arrived to arrest patrons in drag. A riot ensued when a drag queen threw the contents of a cup of coffee in the face of a police officer in response to the officer's grabbing of her arm. The cafe's plate glass windows were shattered in the melée, and then again a few days later after they had been replaced. Although three years later the Stonewall Riots would have a more significant impact, the Compton's Cafeteria riots were among the first in American history where homosexuals and the newly forming transgender community fought against the authorities. (Note: A smaller-scale riot broke out in 1959 in Los Angeles, when the drag queens and street hustlers at Cooper Donuts, who were frequently harassed by the LAPD, fought back after police arrested three people, including John Rechy. Patrons began pelting the police with donuts and coffee cups. The LAPD called for back-up and arrested a number of rioters. Rechy and the other two original detainees were able to escape (Faderman and Timmons, pp. 1–2).)

=== Political history ===
San Francisco continued to grow as a haven for homosexuals. North Beach and Polk Street had been quiet neighborhoods each with a large homosexual population, but in the 1960s the growth of the Castro District outpaced either of them. Thousands of gay men migrated to San Francisco, turning the quiet Irish working-class neighborhood around Castro Street into a bustling center of activity. Meanwhile, many lesbians moved their homes and businesses to nearby Valencia Street in the Mission District. New Yorker Harvey Milk resettled on Castro Street in 1972, and opened Castro Camera the following year. Dissatisfied with the level of bureaucratic apathy and indifference toward the gay community, Milk decided to run for city supervisor. Through his multiple campaigns, culminating in his 1977 election, he became the political voice for the gay community, promoting himself as the "Mayor of Castro Street." By 1977, 25 percent of the population of San Francisco was reported to be gay.

On Labor Day of 1974, tensions between the gay community and the SFPD came to a head when a man was beaten and arrested while walking down Castro Street. Police reinforcements suddenly appeared on the street, their badge numbers hidden, and beat dozens of gay men. Of these, 14 were arrested and charged with obstructing a sidewalk. Harvey Milk dubbed them the "Castro 14", and a $1.375 million lawsuit was filed against the police.

In 1975, after George Moscone had been elected Mayor, he appointed Charles Gain as his Chief of Police. Gain, whose conciliatory position towards African Americans had branded him as one of the most liberal law enforcement officers in the country, soon earned the ire of the police force. Gain implemented policies that proved unpopular with his staff, such as painting police cars powder blue, and barring officers from drinking on the job. His lenient policies towards gays also angered the police force. When asked what he would do if a gay police officer came out, Gain replied "I certainly think that a gay policeman could be up front about it under me. If I had a gay policeman who came out, I would support him 100 percent." This statement sent shock waves through the police department, and made national headlines. Made during the first week of Gain's tenure, the remark also made Mayor Moscone extremely unpopular with the police. The two were so intensely disliked by the police that in 1977 rumors circulated about a plan by right-wing police officers to assassinate Gain, and a year later similar plans formed targeting Mayor Moscone. Upon being informed of this threat, Moscone hired a bodyguard.

=== Assassination of Harvey Milk ===
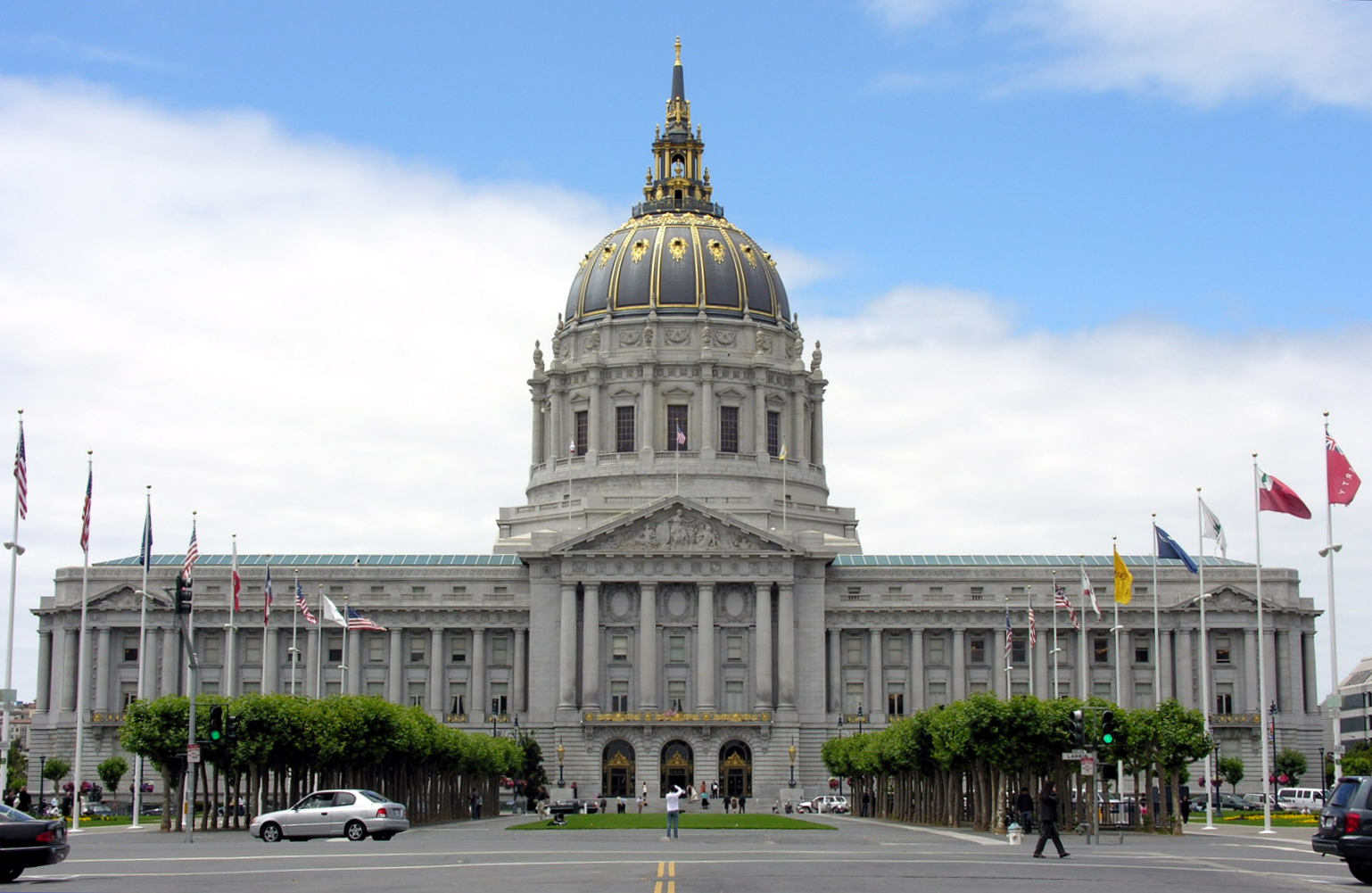
San Francisco City Hall, where the killings took place. The building was heavily damaged during the riots.

Dissatisfied with city politics, and in financial difficulty due to his failing restaurant business and low annual salary of $9,600, former police officer and Supervisor Dan White resigned from the San Francisco Board of Supervisors on November 10, 1978. However, after a meeting with the Police Officers' association and the Board of Realtors, White announced that he wanted his seat back. Liberal Supervisors saw this as an opportunity to end the 6-5 split on the Board that blocked progressive initiatives they wanted to introduce. After intense lobbying by Supervisors Milk and Silver, as well as State Assemblyman Willie Brown, Moscone announced on November 26, 1978, that he would not be reappointing Dan White to the seat he had vacated.

The next morning White went to City Hall armed with his police .38 Smith & Wesson revolver and 10 extra cartridges in his coat pocket. To avoid the metal detector he entered the building through a basement window, and proceeded to the office of Mayor George Moscone. Following a brief argument, White shot the Mayor in the shoulder and chest, and then twice in the head. White then walked to his former office, reloading his gun, and asked Milk to join him. White then shot Milk in the wrist, shoulder and chest, and then twice in the head. Supervisor Dianne Feinstein heard the gunshots and called the police, who found Milk on his stomach, bleeding out from his head wounds.

=== Dan White verdict ===
White was charged with first-degree murder with "special circumstances", which would have permitted the death penalty under the terms of 1978 California Proposition 7. The circumstances alleged in this case were that Mayor Moscone had been killed in order to block the appointment of someone to fill the City Supervisor seat from which Dan White had resigned, and also that multiple people were killed.

White's sentence was reduced due in part to the so-called Twinkie defense. White's defense was that he suffered diminished capacity as a result of his depression, a symptom of which was a change in diet from healthy food to Twinkies and other sugary foods. Contrary to contemporary reports, White's attorneys did not argue that the Twinkies were the cause of White's actions, but that their consumption was symptomatic of his underlying depression. The product itself was only mentioned in passing during the trial.

The jury heard a tape recording of White's confession, which consisted of highly emotional ranting about the pressure he was under, and members of the jury wept in sympathy for the defendant. White represented the "old guard" of San Francisco, who were wary of the influx of minority groups into the city, and represented a more conservative, traditional view, which the more liberal forces in the city—like Moscone and Milk—were perceived to be eroding. Members of the San Francisco Police and Fire Departments raised more than $100,000 to defend White and some wore shirts reading "Free Dan White."

On May 21, 1979, White was found guilty of the voluntary manslaughter of Mayor Moscone and Supervisor Milk. He was sentenced to seven years and eight months in Soledad prison. With good behavior he had the chance to be released after serving two-thirds of his sentence, about five years. Upon hearing the verdict, District Attorney Joseph Freitas, Jr., said "It was a wrong decision. The jury was overwhelmed by emotions and did not sufficiently analyze the evidence that this was deliberate, calculated murder." In defense of his client, White's attorney Douglas Schmidt stated that White "is filled with remorse and I think he's in a very bad condition."

White would later confirm that the killings were premeditated. In 1984, he told former police Inspector Frank Falzon that not only had he planned to kill Moscone and Milk, but also had plans to kill Assemblyman Willie Brown and Supervisor Carol Ruth Silver. He believed that the four politicians were attempting to block his reinstatement as Supervisor. Falzon quoted White as having said, "I was on a mission. I wanted four of them. Carol Ruth Silver, she was the biggest snake ... and Willie Brown, he was masterminding the whole thing."

== Riots ==
=== March through the Castro ===
Today, Dan White was essentially patted on the back. He was convicted of manslaughter—what you get for hit and run. We all know this violence has touched all of us. It was not manslaughter. I was there that day at City Hall. I saw what the violence did. It was not manslaughter, it was murder.

— Cleve Jones

When told of the verdict, Milk's friend and activist Cleve Jones addressed an audience of about 500 people that had gathered on Castro Street, telling them of the verdict. With shouts of "Out of the bars and into the streets" Jones led a crowd down Castro Street, its numbers bolstered by people emerging from each bar. The crowd circled around and marched through the Castro again, by now numbering about 1,500 people.

In a 1984 interview, Jones gave a voice to the feeling in the crowd as they began to group together on Castro Street after news of the verdict spread, stating, "The rage in people's face—I saw people I'd known for years, and they were so furious. That to me was the scariest thing. All these people I'd know from the neighborhood, boys from the corner, these people I'd ridden the bus with, just out there, screaming for blood."

=== Violence at City Hall ===
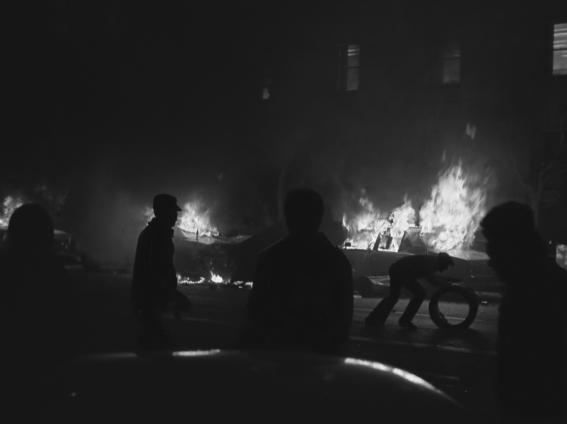
Rioters causing property damage at the Civic Center Plaza. Burning police cruisers are seen in the background

By the time the crowd reached City Hall its numbers had increased to over 5,000. Protesters shouted slogans such as "Kill Dan White!" and "Dump Dianne!", a reference to Mayor Dianne Feinstein. (Note: As president of the Board of Supervisors upon the death of Mayor Moscone, Feinstein had succeeded to the mayoralty on December 4, 1978.) The handful of police officers on duty at the scene were uncertain about how to deal with the situation, and the Police Department, which was unaccustomed to an angry gay crowd, was similarly uncertain of how to proceed. The protesters were convinced that the police and prosecution had conspired to avoid a severe sentence for White, although Prosecutor Thomas Norman denied this repeatedly until his death.

Members of the crowd tore gilded ornamental work from the building's wrought iron doors and then used it to break first floor windows. Several of Harvey Milk's friends monitored and attempted to hold back the crowd, including Milk's long term partner Scott Smith. A formation of police appeared on the north side of the Civic Center Plaza, and those attempting to hold back the mob sat down, grateful for the reinforcements. The officers however did not restrain themselves to holding back the crowd, and instead attacked them with night sticks.

One young man used a metal signpost to smash the window of a police car, and two of his companions threw burning toilet paper on the upholstery, setting it on fire. A dozen more police cars would be destroyed in a similar fashion by these three young men, while others burned eight more non-police vehicles. The photo on the front cover of the Dead Kennedys 1980 album Fresh Fruit for Rotting Vegetables, which shows several police cars on fire, was taken that night. Several crowd members threw tear gas, which they had stolen from police vehicles. Riots began to break out, with one mob disrupting traffic. Electric trollies were disabled when their overhead wires were pulled down, and violence broke out against the police officers, who were outnumbered. Police Chief Charles Gain, standing inside City Hall, ordered officers not to attack and to simply stand their ground.

Mayor Feinstein and Supervisor Carol Ruth Silver addressed the demonstrators in an attempt to defuse the situation. Mayor Feinstein said that she had received news of the verdict "with disbelief", and Supervisor Silver stated, "Dan White has gotten away with murder. It's as simple as that." Silver was injured when struck by a flying object. More than 140 protesters were also injured.

=== Police retaliation ===
After nearly three hours of shouts from the angry crowd, officers moved in to quell the riot. Police reportedly covered their badges with black tape—preventing any identification—and attacked rioters. Dozens of police officers swept into the crowd, using tear gas to force protesters away from the building. Police were surprised at the resistance they faced from the protesters, who attempted to push them back using tree branches, chrome torn off city buses, and asphalt ripped from the street, as weapons. As one man ignited the last police car he shouted to a reporter "Make sure you put in the paper that I ate too many Twinkies." Sixty officers were injured, and about two dozen arrests were made.

The second stage of the violence was a police raid/riot hours later in the predominantly gay Castro neighborhood, which vandalized a gay bar called the Elephant Walk and injured many of its occupants. After order was restored at City Hall, SFPD cars carrying dozens of officers headed into the Castro District. The officers entered the Elephant Walk bar, despite their orders not to do so. They shouted "dirty cocksuckers" and "sick faggots", shattered the large plate glass windows of the bar, and attacked patrons. After 15 minutes, police withdrew from the bar and joined other officers who were indiscriminately attacking gays on the street. The incident lasted nearly two hours.

When Police Chief Charles Gain heard about the unauthorized Elephant Walk raid, he immediately went to the location and ordered his men to leave. Later that night, freelance reporter Michael Weiss saw a group of police officers celebrating at a downtown bar. "We were at City Hall the day [the killings] happened and we were smiling then," one officer explained. "We were there tonight and we're still smiling."

At least 61 police officers and an estimated 100 members of the public were hospitalized in the course of the riot. A civil grand jury convened to find out who ordered the attack, but it ended inconclusively with a settlement covering personal injury claims and damages.

=== Aftermath ===
The next morning gay leaders convened in a committee room in the Civic Center. Supervisor Harry Britt, who had replaced Milk, along with members of the Harvey Milk Democratic Club, made it clear that nobody was to apologize for the riots. Britt informed a press conference, "Harvey Milk's people do not have anything to apologize for. Now the society is going to have to deal with us not as nice little fairies who have hairdressing salons, but as people capable of violence. We're not going to put up with Dan Whites anymore." Reporters were surprised that a public official would condone the violent acts of the previous night, expecting an apology from Britt. Subsequent attempts to find a gay leader who would give an apologetic statement proved unsuccessful.

That evening, May 22, would have been the 49th birthday of Harvey Milk. City officials had considered revoking the permit for a rally planned for that night, but decided against it for fear of sparking more violence. Officials stated that the rally could channel the community's anger into something positive. Police from San Francisco and its neighboring towns were placed on alert by Mayor Feinstein, and Cleve Jones coordinated contingency plans with the police, and trained 300 monitors to keep an eye on the crowd. Approximately 10,000 to 20,000 people gathered on Castro and Market streets, where the mood was "angry, but subdued." Officers monitored the crowd from a distance, however the crowd engaged in a peaceful celebration of Milk's life. Attendees danced to popular disco songs, drank beer, and sang a tribute to Milk.

On the same night, for over three hours about a hundred people held a demonstration at Sheridan Square in Manhattan, to protest the verdict. About 20 officers observed the protest, which began at 8 pm, but no arrests were made. A candlelight vigil was planned for two days later, sponsored by the Coalition for Lesbian and Gay Rights and the National Gay Task Force.

On October 14, 1979, between 75,000 and 125,000 people marched on Washington for gay rights. Many carried portraits of Milk, and placards honoring his legacy. The rally, something that Milk had intended to organize, was instead a tribute to his life.

Dan White was released from prison on January 14, 1984 after serving five years of a seven-year, eight-month sentence. On the evening following his release, 9,000 people marched down Castro street and burned his effigy. State authorities reportedly feared an assassination attempt, and in response Scott Smith urged people not to retaliate with violence. He stated, "Harvey was against the death penalty. He was a nonviolent person."

White committed suicide by carbon monoxide poisoning on October 21, 1985. He connected a rubber hose to his car's exhaust system and routed it to the interior of the vehicle, which he let fill with carbon monoxide. Mayor Feinstein said, "This latest tragedy should close a very sad chapter in this city's history." According to Orange County lawyer Jeff Walsworth, White had expressed remorse for the killings in February 1984. White reportedly stated that it would always cause him inner turmoil. Inspector Falzone said the contrary, however, commenting that at no time did White express remorse in any form at the deaths of Moscone and Milk.

== Analysis ==
=== Causes ===
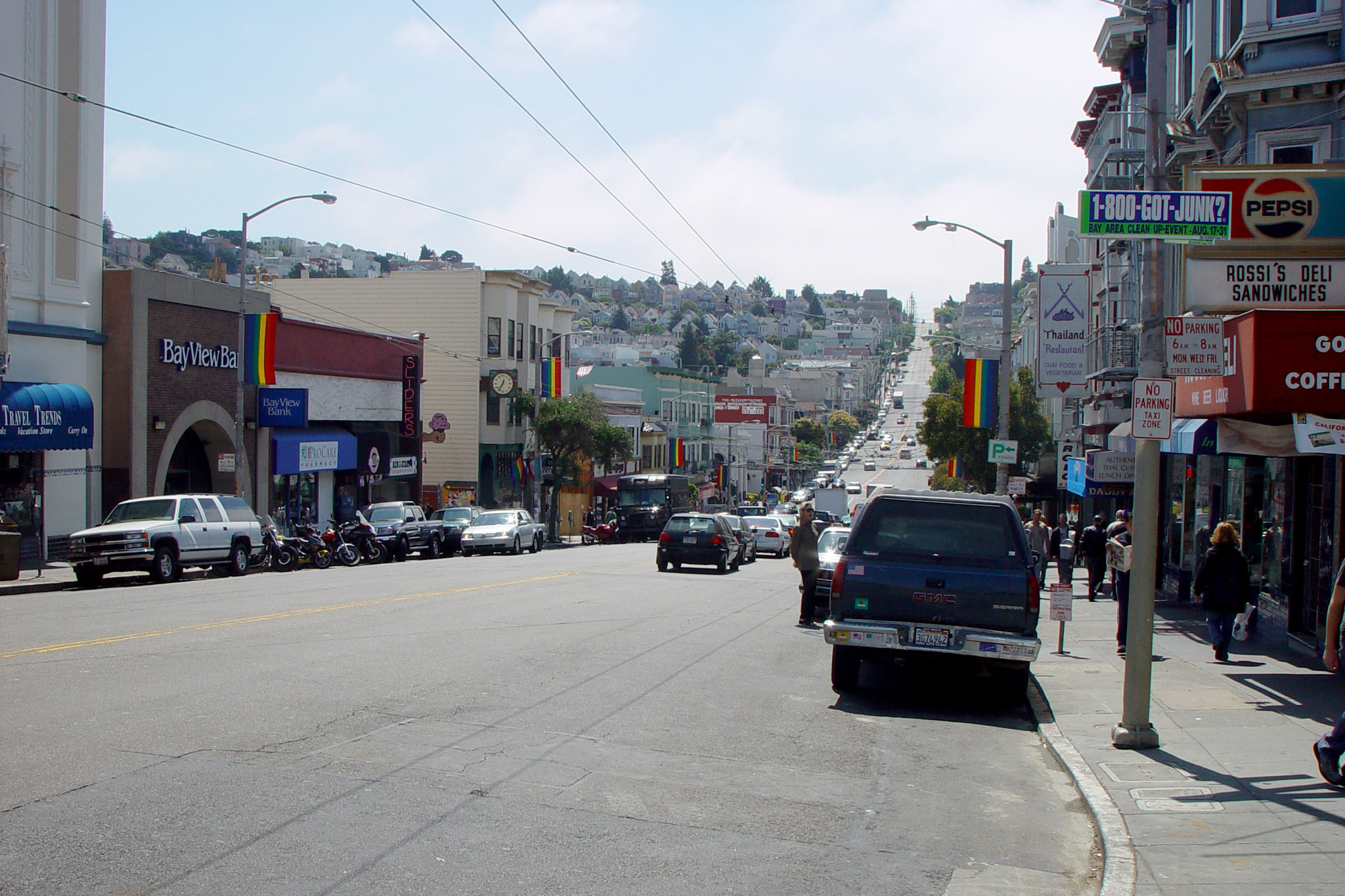
San Francisco's Castro district became an early stronghold for the emerging gay community. (Photo taken 2002)

The community had a long history of conflict with the San Francisco Police Department. Following World War II, gay bars were subject to frequent raids and attempts by the California Department of Alcoholic Beverage Control to revoke their alcohol licenses. They were accused of serving alcohol to homosexuals, a criminal act at the time.

The growing political and economic power of the city's gay community conflicted with the established but dwindling numbers of the conservative institutions, such as the police and fire departments. By 1971, police were arresting an average of 2,800 men per year on public sex charges; by contrast, 63 such arrests were made in New York City, although up to a quarter of San Francisco was reported to be gay at the time. Many charges were dismissed due to entrapment, but several men were given harsh sentences. In March, 1979, an attack on a lesbian bar by off-duty police officers made the national news and highlighted the tension between the LGBT community and police. The Washington Post cited the incident when it reported a week before the White Night riots that anti-homosexual violence had "increased to a level unparalleled in San Francisco's recent history", including what the gay community perceived as "increasing harassment and abuse directed toward homosexuals by the police themselves," as well as indifference by city officials.

When Dan White was found guilty of voluntary manslaughter, his successful diminished capacity defense enraged the gay community. That the police and fire departments had raised money for his defense gave their anger a focus, turning it against the city government and especially the SFPD.

=== Effects on San Francisco politics ===
With the 1979 municipal elections occurring only months after the riot, prominent gay leaders feared a backlash at the polls. The elections continued without incident, and the gay community fared better than expected, wielding unprecedented influence. Although the virtually unknown gay Mayoral candidate David Scott finished third in the election, his showing was strong enough to force Mayor Feinstein into a runoff election against conservative City Supervisor Quentin Kopp. Feinstein's promises to appoint more gay people to public office, and her heavy campaigning in the Castro, ensured that she won enough support from the gay community to give her a full term as Mayor.

One of Mayor Feinstein's first actions upon being elected was to announce the appointment of Cornelius Murphy as the new Chief of Police. Murphy declared that police cars would no longer be colored powder blue, but instead would be repainted as "macho black-and-whites." This pleased the rank and file, and restored confidence in police leadership. Murphy also vowed to maintain the progressive policy towards gays that his predecessor had implemented. By 1980, one in seven new police recruits was either gay or lesbian. In one of his last public appearances, outgoing Police Chief Charles Gain stated that he fully expected to see the day when San Francisco would have both a gay mayor and Chief of Police. By October 1985, an organization for gay law enforcement personnel in California, the Golden State Peace Officers Association, had incorporated as a non-profit organization. It was founded by Art Roth, an Oakland police officer who was present on the night of the riots.

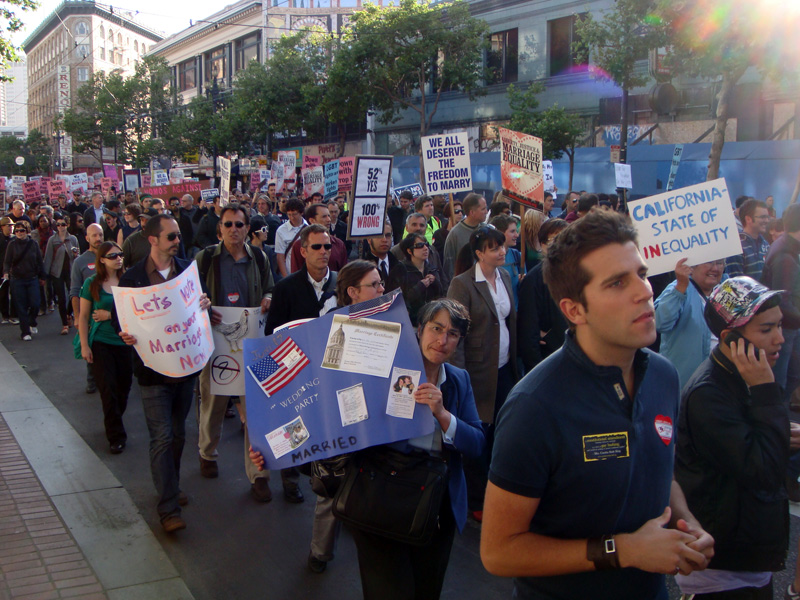
Protesters at the "Day of Decision" rally marched up Market Street in downtown San Francisco following the California Supreme Court ruling.

Thirty years after the announcement of Dan White's guilty verdict, the Supreme Court of California prepared their decision on Strauss v. Horton. The case was an attempt to overturn Proposition 8, which had added the statement "Only marriage between a man and a woman is valid or recognized in California" to Article I, section 7.5 of the California State Constitution. This ballot initiative, which was approved in 2008, eliminated the right of same-sex couples to marry in the state.

In late May 2009, while the Court was preparing its announcement, rumors surfaced on the Internet that San Francisco Mayor Gavin Newsom had asked the court not to announce the decision on May 21. They suggested that he made this request so that the announcement would not coincide with the 30th anniversary of the White Night riots. On May 26, the court upheld the validity of Proposition 8, but ruled that the 18,000 marriages that had already been performed would remain valid. In 2013, same-sex marriage again became legal when that voter initiative was ruled unconstitutional by the U.S. Supreme Court in Hollingsworth v. Perry.

=== Effects on the AIDS movement ===
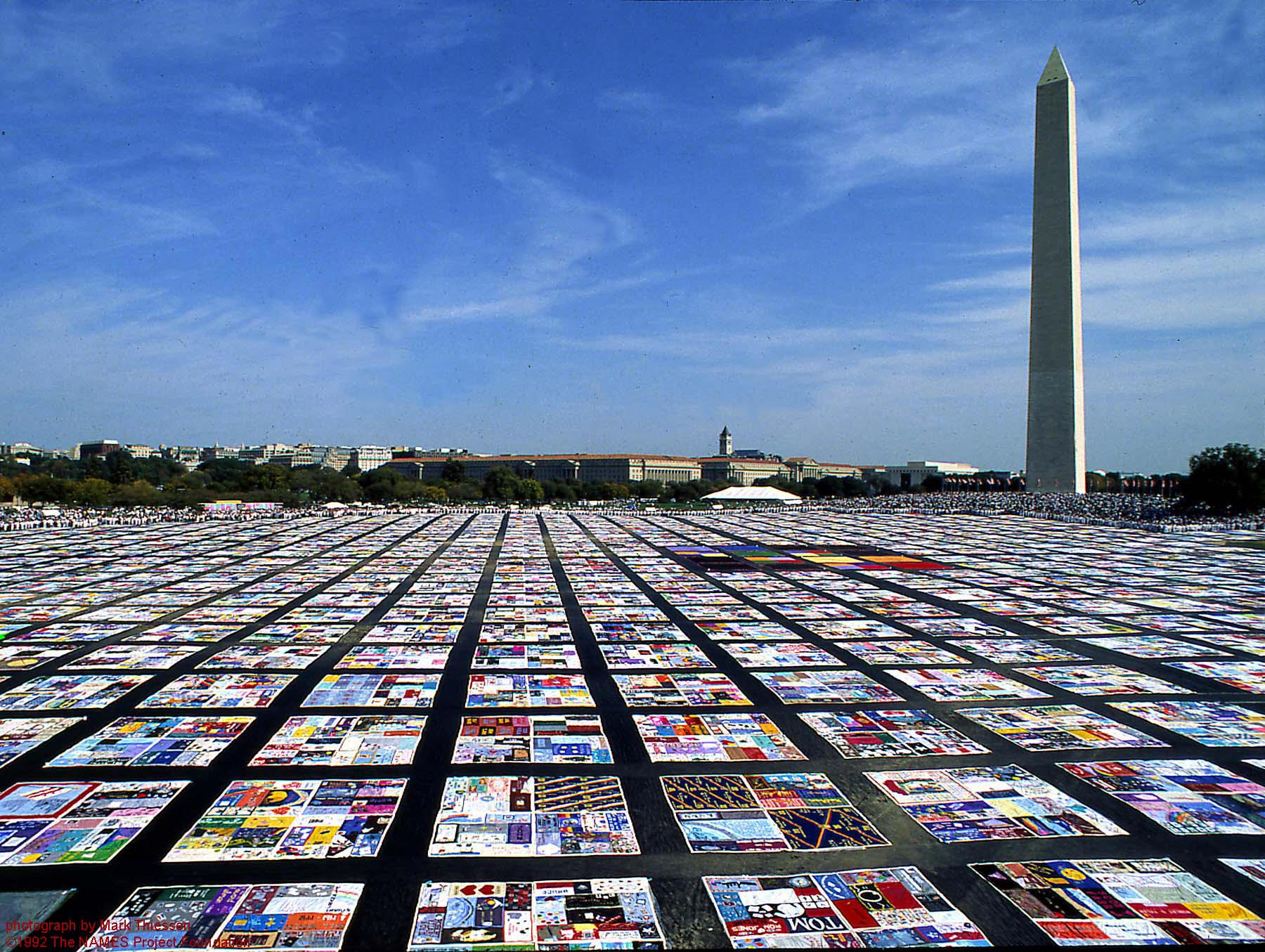
The NAMES Project AIDS quilt, representing people who have died of AIDS, in front of the Washington Monument

Cleve Jones played a major role in the investigation of the riots, and had since become a prominent activist. He dropped out of school to work as a legislative consultant to California State Assembly Speakers Leo McCarthy and Willie Brown. He also spent time organizing political campaigns. In 1981, while working as a consultant to the California State Assembly Health Committee, he became aware of gay men in San Francisco contracting unusual diseases, such as Kaposi's sarcoma. The gay community was eventually seriously affected by the AIDS epidemic, and Jones became a key AIDS activist. Jones co-founded the Kaposi's Sarcoma Research & Education Foundation, which in 1982 became the San Francisco AIDS Foundation. On November 27, 1985, at a candlelight vigil on the anniversary of the Moscone-Milk assassinations, Jones learned that 1,000 people had died of AIDS. He proposed the creation of a quilt, in remembrance of those who had died. In 1987, Jones, by then HIV-positive himself, launched the NAMES Project AIDS Memorial Quilt. As of 2009, the quilt consists of over 44,000 individual panels. In a 2004 interview, Jones said "I thought, what a perfect symbol; what a warm, comforting, middle-class, middle-American, traditional-family-values symbol to attach to this disease that's killing homosexuals and IV drug users and Haitian immigrants, and maybe, just maybe, we could apply those traditional family values to my family."

== See also ==
- Gay Power, Gay Politics, an episode of CBS Reports about the San Francisco LGBT community, produced in the aftermath of the riots
- LGBT history
- The Times of Harvey Milk, a 1984 documentary which describes the White Night riots
- List of incidents of civil unrest in the United States

== Bibliography ==
- Bérubé, Allan (1990). Coming Out Under Fire: The History of Gay Men and Women in World War II. The Free Press. ISBN 0-7432-1071-9.
- Carter, David (2004). Stonewall: The Riots that Sparked the Gay Revolution. St. Martin's Press. ISBN 0-312-34269-1.
- D'Emilio, John (1992). Making Trouble: Essays on Gay History, Politics, and the University. Routledge. ISBN 0-415-90510-9.
- Duberman, Martin (1993). Stonewall. Penguin Books. ISBN 0-525-93602-5.
- Faderman, Lillian (2006). Gay L.A.: A History of Sexual Outlaws, Power Politics, and Lipstick Lesbians. Basic Books. ISBN 0-465-02288-X.
- Katz, Jonathan (1976). Gay American History: Lesbians and Gay Men in the U.S.A.. Thomas Y. Crowell Company. ISBN 0-690-01165-2.
- Jones, Cleve (2000). Stitching a Revolution: The Making of an Activist. HarperOne. ISBN 0-06-251642-6.
- Peddicord, Richard (1996). Gay and Lesbian Rights: A Question: Sexual rights or Social Justice?. Rowman & Littlefield. ISBN 1-55612-759-6.
- Shilts, Randy (1982). The Mayor of Castro Street: The Life and Times of Harvey Milk. St. Martin's Press. ISBN 0-312-56085-0.
- Shilts, Randy (1987). And the Band Played On. St. Martin's Press. ISBN 0-312-00994-1.
- Stryker, Susan; Van Buskirk, Jim (1996). Gay By the Bay: A History of Queer Culture in the San Francisco Bay Area. Chronicle Books. ISBN 0-8118-1187-5.
- Weiss, Mike (2010). Double Play: The Hidden Passions Behind the Double Assassination of George Moscone and Harvey Milk. Vince Emery Productions. ISBN 978-0-9825650-5-6.
- Woods, William J.; Binson, Diane (2003). Gay Bathhouses and Public Health Policy. Haworth Press. ISBN 1-56023-272-2.
