= Castro District, San Francisco =

Neighborhood in Eureka Valley, US

Castro District
- Neighborhood
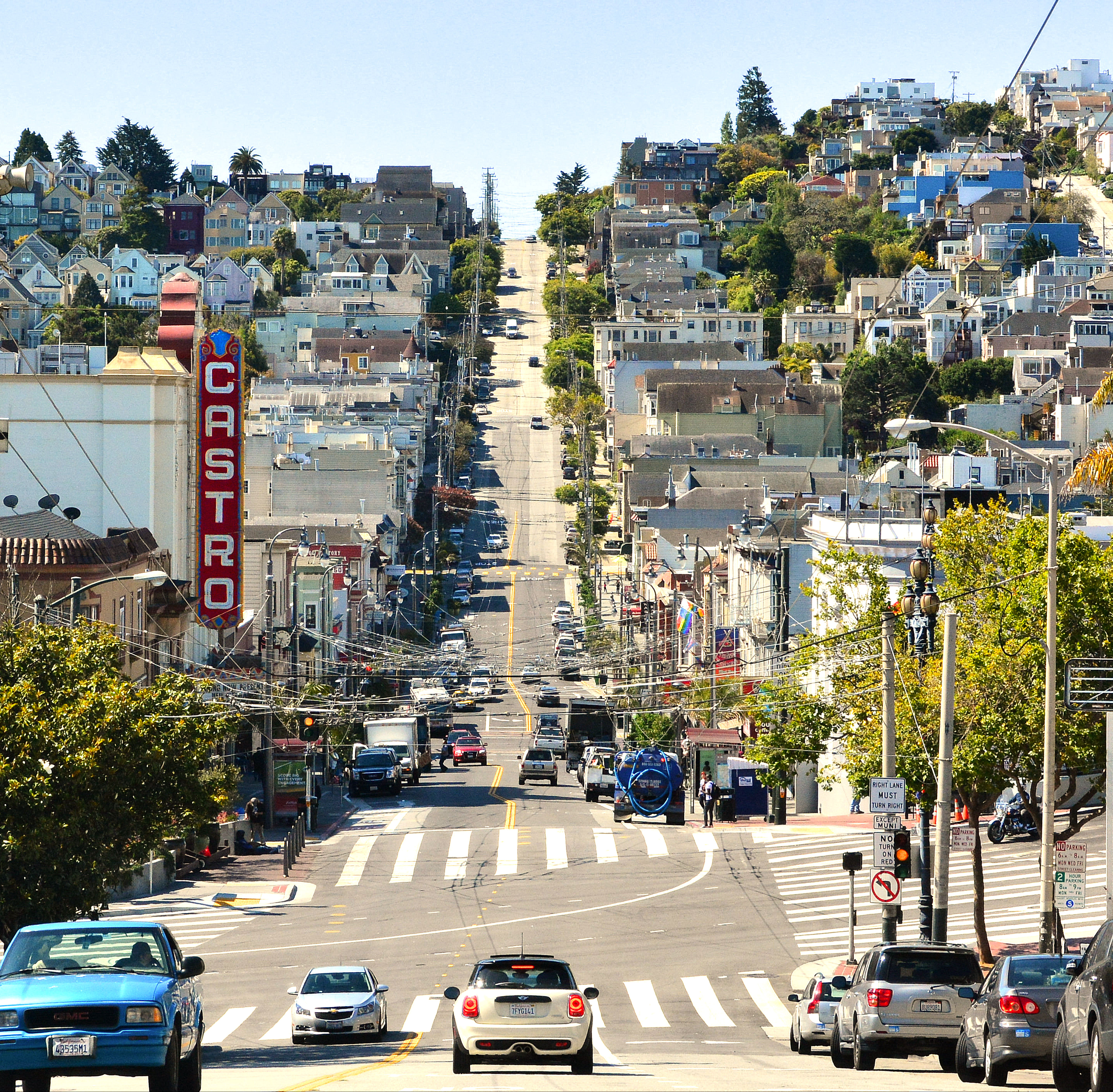
- Castro Street, with the Castro Theater to the left
- Nickname: The Castro
- Location within Central San Francisco
- Coordinates: 37°45′39″N 122°26′06″W
- Country: United States
- State: California
- City-county: San Francisco
- Named for: José Castro

Government
  - Supervisor: Rafael Mandelman
  - Assemblymember: Matt Haney (D)
  - State Senator: Scott Wiener (D)
  - U. S. Rep.: Nancy Pelosi (D)

Area
  - Total: 0.526 sq mi (1.36 km^{2})
  - Land: 0.526 sq mi (1.36 km^{2})

Population
  - Total: 12,064
  - Density: 22,900/sq mi (8,860/km^{2})
- Time zone: UTC-8 (PST)
  - Summer (DST): UTC-7 (PDT)
- ZIP codes: 94110, 94114
- Area codes: 415/628

The Castro District, commonly referred to as the Castro, is a neighborhood in Eureka Valley in San Francisco. The Castro was one of the first gay neighborhoods in the United States. Having transformed from a working-class neighborhood through the 1960s and 1970s into one that came to represent some of the highest geographical and communal concentrations of same-sex coupling, the Castro remains one of the most prominent symbols of lesbian, gay and bisexual activism and events in the world.

== Location ==
San Francisco's gay village is mostly concentrated in the business district that is located on Castro Street from Market Street to 19th Street. It extends down Market Street toward Church Street and on both sides of the Castro neighborhood from Church Street to Eureka Street. Although the greater gay community was, and is, concentrated in the Castro, many gay people live in the surrounding residential areas bordered by Corona Heights, the Mission District, Noe Valley, Twin Peaks, and Haight-Ashbury neighborhoods. Some consider it to include Duboce Triangle and Dolores Heights, which both have a strong LGBTQ presence.

Castro Street, which originates a few blocks north of the Castro Street Business District at the intersection of Divisadero and Waller Streets, runs south through Noe Valley, crossing the 24th Street business district and ending as a continuous street a few blocks farther south as it moves toward the Glen Park neighborhood. It reappears in several discontinuous sections before ultimately terminating at Chenery Street, in the heart of Glen Park.

== History ==
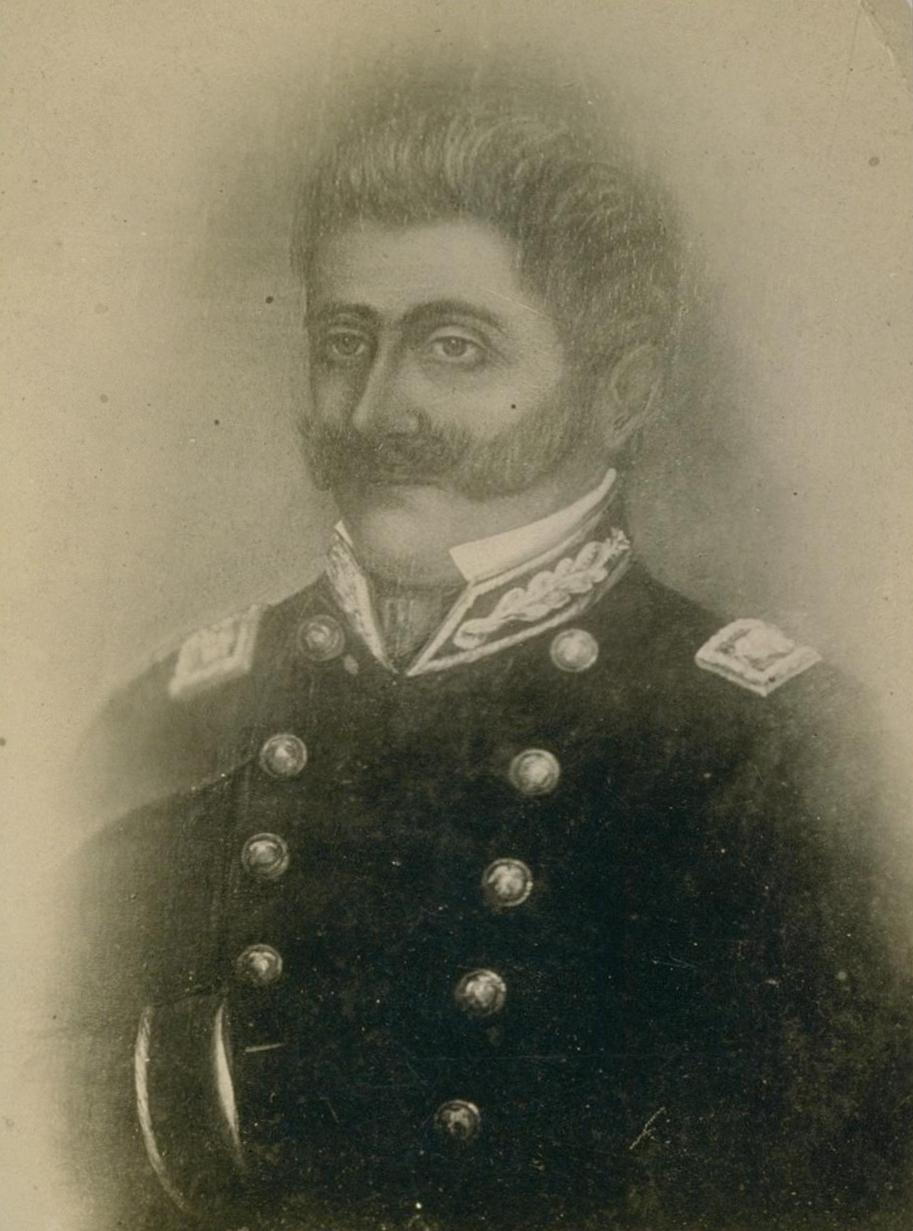
The Castro is named after José Castro, a Californio politician who served as Governor of Alta California.

Castro Street was named after José Castro (1808–1860), a locally influential Mexican general and statesman who briefly held the title of alcalde of Alta California from 1835 to 1836. The neighborhood known as the Castro, in the district of Eureka Valley, was created in 1887 when the Market Street Railway Company built a line linking Eureka Valley to downtown.

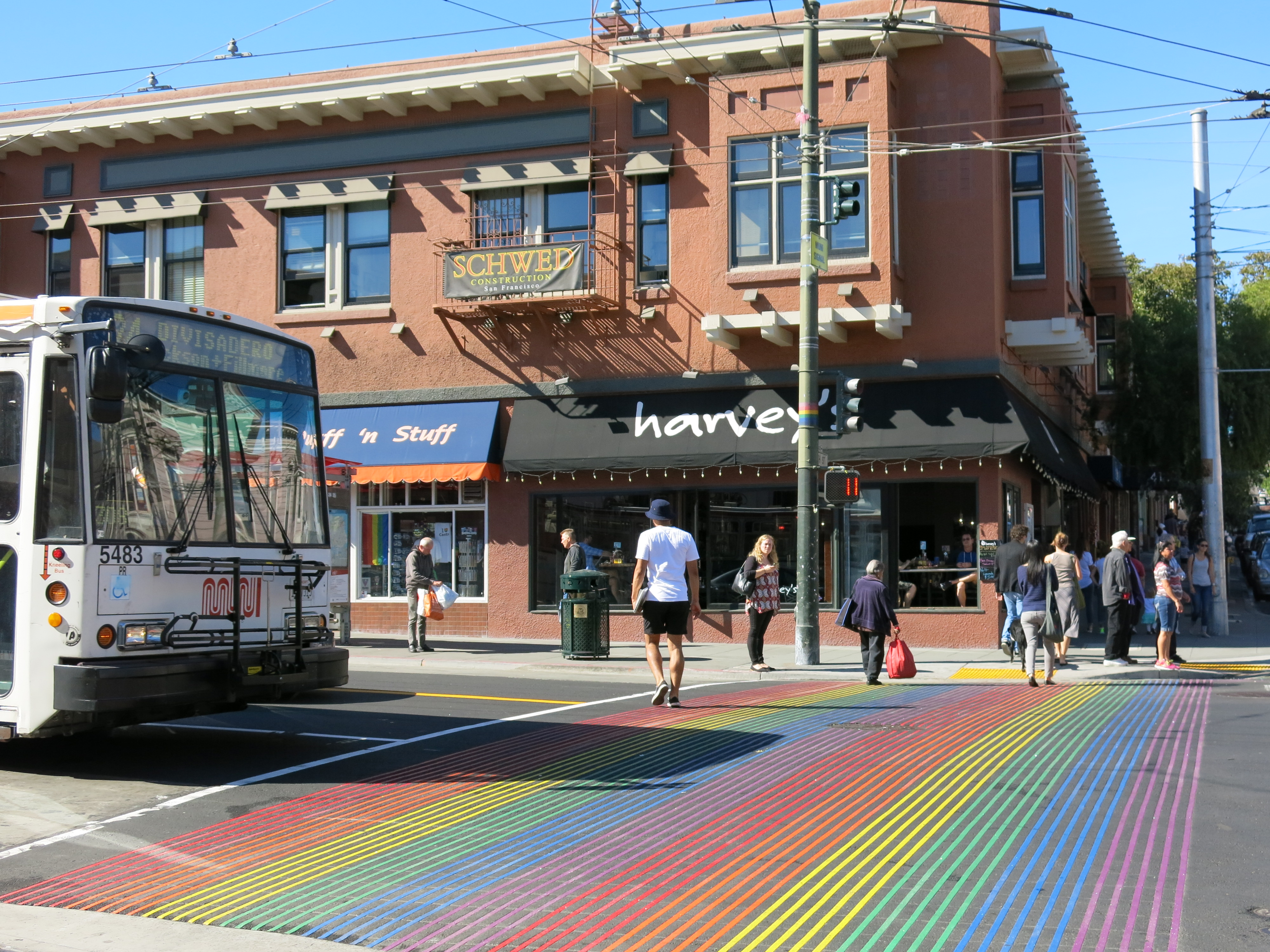
Castro Street pedestrian crossing with rainbow flag color

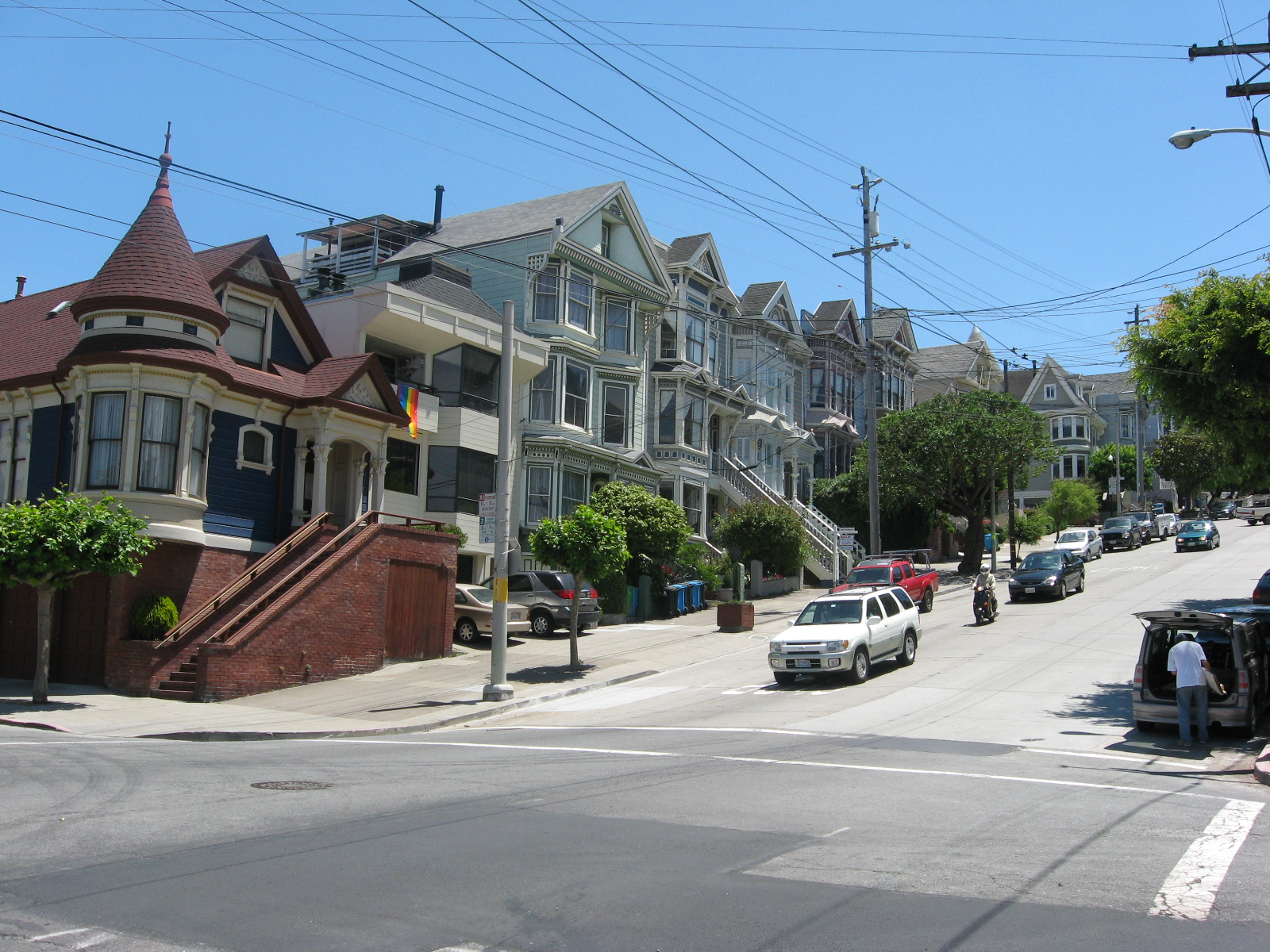
Corner of 20th and Castro Streets

In 1891, Alfred E. Clarke built his mansion at the corner of Douglass and Caselli Avenue at 250 Douglass which is commonly referenced as the Caselli Mansion. It survived the 1906 earthquake and fire which destroyed a large portion of San Francisco.

=== Late 19th century Finnish settlement ===
During the California Gold Rush and in its aftermath, a substantial Finnish population settled in San Francisco. Finnish Club No. 1 was established in the Castro District of San Francisco in 1882. Soon after, two "Finnish Halls" were erected nearby. One was located at the corner of 24th Street and Hoffman Street. The other hall was located on Flint Street, on the "Rocky Hill" above Castro, an area densely populated by Finns at the time, consequently nicknamed "Finn Town".

In 1899, the First Finnish Lutheran Church was founded on 50 Belcher Street, in what then was considered part of the Eureka Valley district of San Francisco, but what is located on the outskirts of what today is best known as the Castro District. Next to it, on September 17, 1905, the cornerstone was laid for the Danish St. Ansgar Church at 152 Church Street, between Market Street and Duboce Avenue. In 1964, St. Ansgar merged with First Finnish Lutheran Church. The name for the united church, St. Francis Lutheran Church, was derived from San Francisco.

Before the 1906 San Francisco earthquake, nearly all the children attending the McKinley School (now McKinley Elementary School) at 1025 14th Street (at Castro) were Finnish. Following the earthquake, a large number of Finns from San Francisco and elsewhere moved to Berkeley, where a Finnish community had been established already before the earthquake. The brick and wood frame of the St. Francis Lutheran Church building survived the 1906 San Francisco earthquake and then was used for several months as an infirmary. Following the earthquake, the same year, Finns founded the Lutheran Church of the Cross in Berkeley, at University Avenue, where the Lutheran congregation still operates today.

In c. 1910, a bathhouse called Finnila's Finnish Baths began serving customers in the Castro District, at 9 Douglass Street. Its opening as an official business serving the general public took place in 1913. In 1919, the business moved to 4032 17th Street, a half block west from the busy Castro Street. In 1932, the business moved again, now to 2284 Market Street. In 1986, after having been stationed in the Castro District for over seven decades, the business moved the final time, now to 465 Taraval Street in the San Francisco's Sunset District, where it continued as Finnila's Health Club, serving women only. Despite public outcry and attempts to prevent the closing of the popular Finnila's Market Street bathhouse, the old bathhouse building was demolished by Alfred Finnila soon after the farewell party held in the end of December 1985. Today, the Finnila family owns the new Market & Noe Center building at the location of the old bathhouse, in the corner of Market and Noe Streets.

=== Change of character ===
From 1910 on, the Castro District of San Francisco and some of the surrounding areas were known by the term Little Scandinavia, because of the large number of the residents in the neighborhood originating from Danish, Norwegian, Swedish and Finnish ancestry.

The 1943 novel Mama's Bank Account by Kathryn Forbes focused on a Norwegian family living in the area in the 1910s. Forbes' book served as the inspiration for John Van Druten's 1944 play I Remember Mama. The play was adapted to a Broadway theater production in 1944; to a movie in 1948; to a one-hour Lux Radio Theatre presentation on August 30, 1948; to a CBS Mama television series running from 1949 until 1957; and to a Broadway musical in 1979. Mama's Bank Account reflected a (then) Eureka Valley neighborhood, where for generations Norwegians worshiped at the Norwegian Lutheran Church at 19th and Dolores streets, and met for fraternal, social events, and Saturday night dances at Dovre Hall, 3543 18th Street, now the Women's Building.

The Cove on Castro used to be called The Norse Cove at the time. The Scandinavian Seamen's Mission operated for a long time on 15th Street, off Market Street, just around the corner from the Swedish-American Hall, which remains in the district. In the 1920s – during prohibition – the downstairs of the Swedish-American Hall served as a speak-easy, one of many in the area. "Unlicensed saloons" were known as speak-easies, according to an 1889 newspaper. They were "so called because of the practice of speaking quietly about such a place in public, or when inside it, so as not to alert the police or neighbors".

Scandinavian-style "half-timber" construction can still be seen in some of the buildings along Market Street, between Castro and Church Streets. A restaurant called Scandinavian Deli operated for decades on Market Street, between Noe and Sanchez Streets, almost directly across the street from Finnila's.

Receiving an influx of Irish, Italian and other immigrants in the 1940s, the Castro gradually became an ethnically mixed working-class neighborhood, and it remained so until the mid-1960s. There was originally a cable car line with large double-ended cable cars that ran along Castro Street from Market Street to 29th St., until the tracks were dismantled in 1941 and the cable car line was replaced by the 24 MUNI bus. The Castro is at the end of the straight portion of the Market Street thoroughfare, and a mostly residential area follows Market Street as it curves and rises up and around the Twin Peaks mountains.

=== LGBTQ community ===
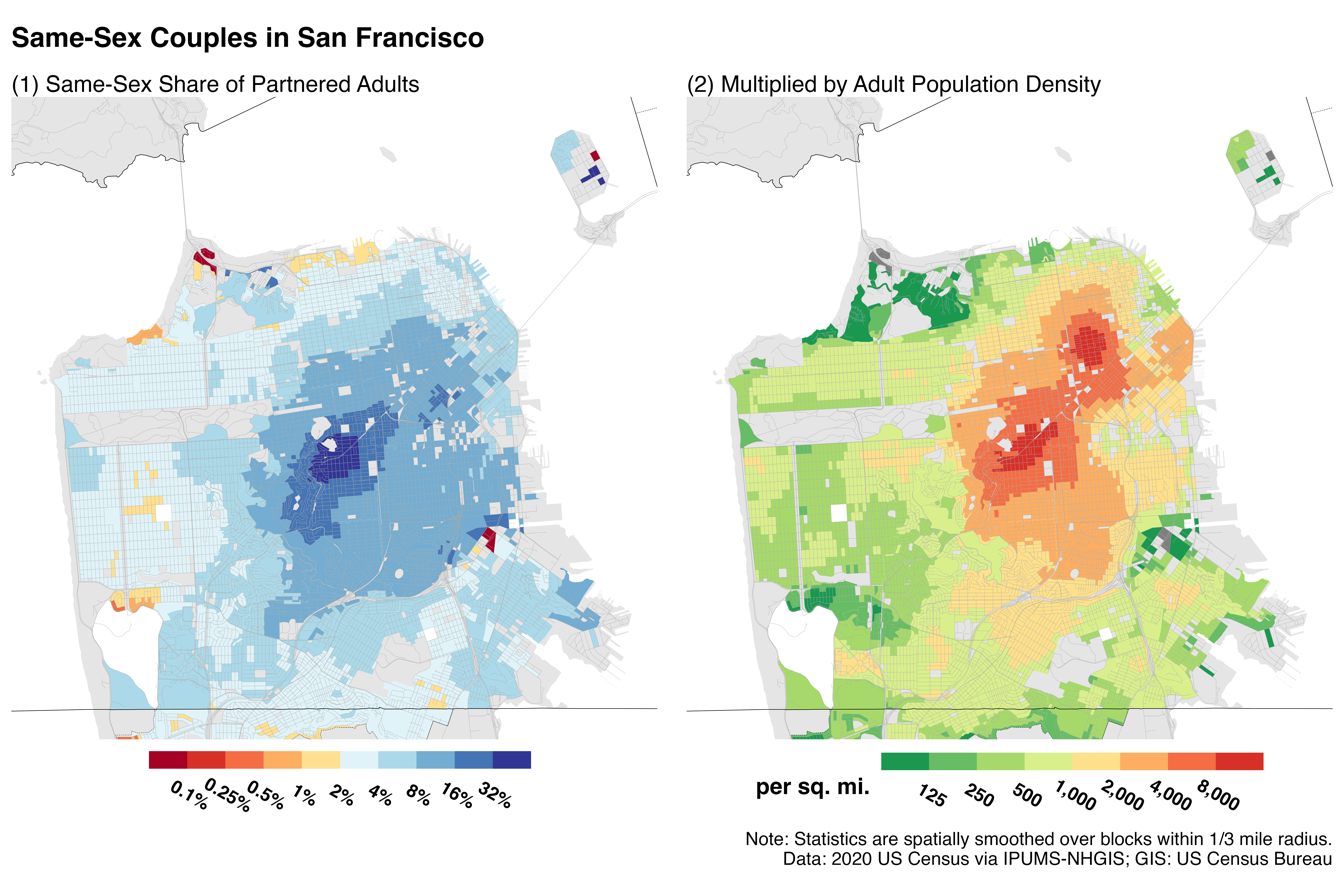
Map of same-sex couples in San Francisco

The U.S. military discharged thousands of gay servicemen from the Pacific theatre in San Francisco during World War II (early 1940s) because of their sexuality. Many settled in the Bay Area, San Francisco and Sausalito. In San Francisco, an established gay community had begun in numerous areas including Polk Street (which used to be regarded as the city's gay center from the 1950s to the early 1980s), the Tenderloin and South of Market. The 1960s saw large numbers of families moving out of the Castro to the suburbs in what became known as the "White flight", leaving open large pockets of real estate and creating appealing locations for gay purchasers. The Missouri Mule first opened in 1935 by Norwegian Immigrant Hans K Lund and would find its place in San Francisco's history becoming a proud icon of the LGBTQ community following its reopening in 1963.

The Castro's age as a gay mecca began during the late 1960s with the Summer of Love in the neighboring Haight-Ashbury district in 1967. The two neighborhoods are separated by a steep hill, topped by Buena Vista Park. The hippie and free love movements had fostered communal living and free society ideas including the housing of large groups of people in hippie communes. Androgyny became popular with men even in full beards as gay hippie men began to move into the area. The 1967 gathering brought tens of thousands of middle-class youth from all over the United States to the Haight, which saw its own exodus when well-organized individuals and collectives started to view the Castro as an oasis from the massive influx. Many of the hippies had no way to support themselves or places to shelter. The Haight became drug-ridden and violent, chasing off the gay population, who looked for a more stable area to live.

The gay community created an upscale, fashionable urban center in the Castro District in the 1970s. Many San Francisco gays also moved there in the years around 1970 from what was then the most prominent gay neighborhood, Polk Gulch, because large Victorian houses were available at low rents or available for purchase for low down payments when their former middle-class owners had fled to the suburbs.

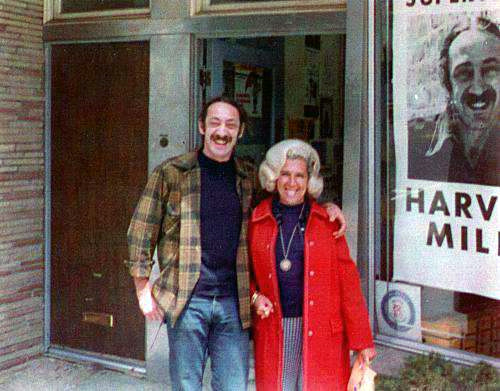
Harvey Milk, here with his sister-in-law in front of Castro Camera in 1973, had been changed by his experience with the counterculture of the 1960s. His store was used as his campaign headquarters and remains a tourist destination.

By 1973, Harvey Milk, who would become the most famous resident of the neighborhood, opened a camera store, Castro Camera, and began political involvement as a gay activist, further contributing to the notion of the Castro as a gay destination. Some of the culture of the late 1970s included what was termed the "Castro clone", a mode of dress and personal grooming that exemplified butchness and masculinity of the working-class men in construction—tight denim jeans, black or sand combat boots, tight T-shirt or, often, an Izod crocodile shirt, possibly a red plaid flannel outer shirt, and usually sporting a mustache or full beard—in vogue with the gay male population at the time, and which gave rise to the nickname "Clone Canyon" for the stretch of Castro Street between 18th and Market Streets.

The area was heavily impacted by the HIV/AIDS crisis of the 1980s. Beginning in 1984, city officials began a crackdown on bathhouses and launched initiatives that aimed to prevent the spread of AIDS. Kiosks lining Market Street and Castro Street now have posters promoting safe sex and testing right alongside those advertising online dating services.

In 2019, San Francisco Board of Supervisors member Rafael Mandelman authored an ordinance to create the Castro LGBTQ Cultural District; the ordinance was passed unanimously.

== Attractions ==
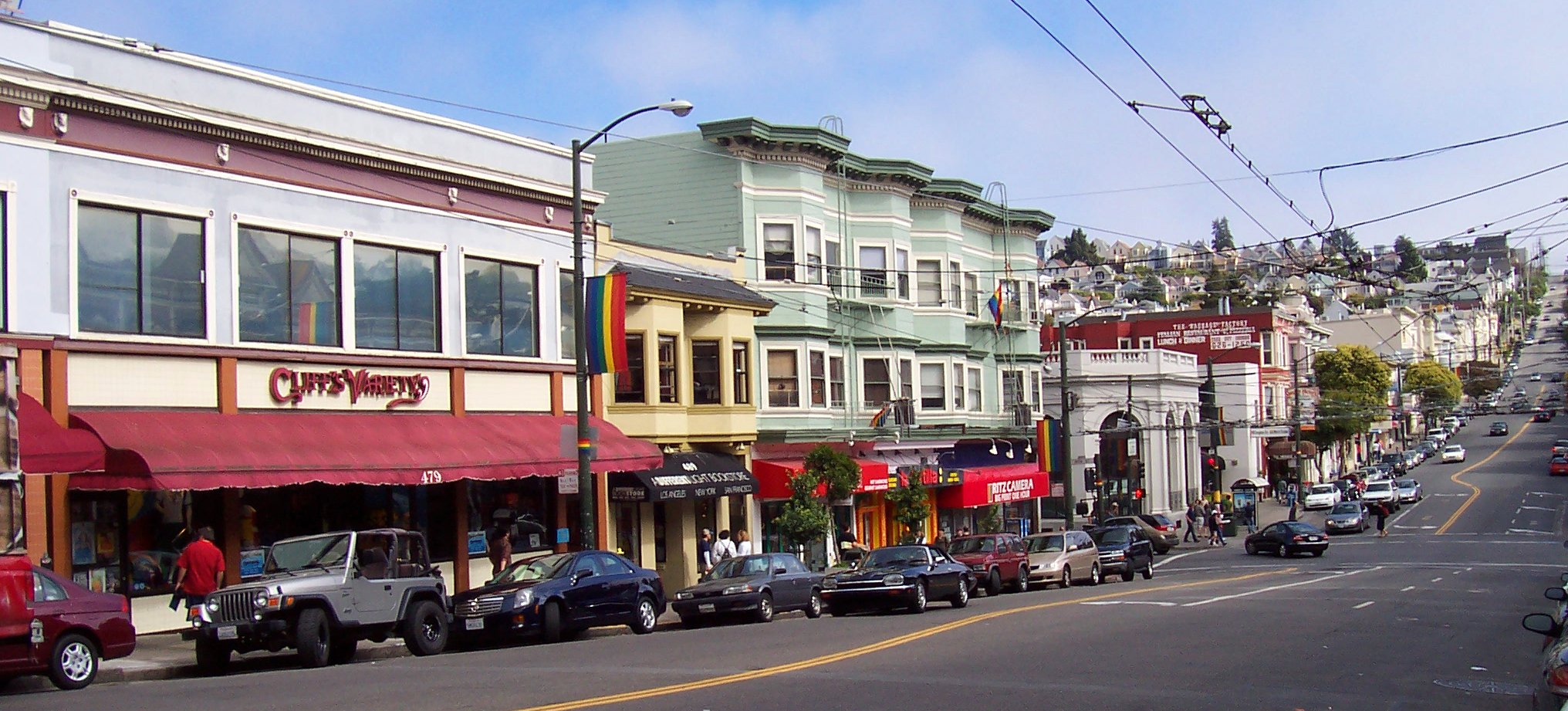
Stores on Castro near the intersection with 18th Street. Rainbow flags, which are commonly associated with gay pride, are hung as banners on streetlights along the road.

A Farmers' Market is held on Noe Street near Beaver Street on Wednesday afternoons in the Spring, Summer, and Autumn.

One of the more notable features of the neighborhood is Castro Theatre, a movie palace built in 1922 and one of San Francisco's premier movie houses.

18th and Castro is a major intersection in the Castro, where many historic events, marches, and protests have taken and continue to take place.

A major cultural destination in the neighborhood is the GLBT Historical Society Museum (originally called the GLBT History Museum), which opened for previews on December 10, 2010, at 4127 18th St. The grand opening of the museum took place on the evening of January 13, 2011. The first full-scale, stand-alone museum of lesbian, gay, bisexual and transgender history in the United States (and only the second in the world after the Schwules Museum in Berlin), the GLBT History Museum is a project of the GLBT Historical Society.

The F Market heritage streetcar line turnaround is at Market and 17th-streets where the Jane Warner city parklet sits. Across Castro street is the Harvey Milk Plaza, in honor of its most famous resident with its iconic giant flag pole with an oversized rainbow flag, symbol of the LGBT community. Below street level is the main entrance to the Castro Street Station, a Muni Metro subway station and a multitiered park. Milk's camera store and campaign headquarters which were at 575 Castro has a memorial plaque and mural on the inside of the store, formerly housing the Human Rights Campaign Action Center and Store; it now houses an LGBTQ+ arts store. There is a smaller mural above the sidewalk on the building showing Milk looking down on the street fondly.

Across Market Street from Harvey Milk Plaza, and slightly up the hill, is the Pink Triangle Park – 17th Street at Market, a city park and monument named after the pink triangles forcibly worn by gay prisoners persecuted by the Nazis during World War II.

Harvey's was formerly the Elephant Walk, raided by police after the White Night Riots.

Twin Peaks Tavern, the first gay bar in the city, and possibly in the United States, with plate glass windows to fully visibly expose patrons to the public, is located at the intersection of Market and Castro.

Kite Hill is a city park located in the Castro, named for its gusty winds.

The Hartford Street Zen Center is also located in the Castro, as well as the Most Holy Redeemer Catholic Church, 100 Diamond Street.

Special events, parades and street fairs that are held in the Castro include the Castro Street Fair, the Dyke March, the famed Halloween in the Castro (which was discontinued in 2007 due to street violence), Pink Saturday (discontinued in the Castro in 2016), Harvey Milk Day, and the San Francisco International LGBT Film Festival.

An LGBTQ Walk of Fame, the Rainbow Honor Walk, was installed in August 2014 with an inaugural twenty sidewalk bronze plaques representing past LGBTQ icons in their field who continue to serve as inspirations. The walk was originally planned to coincide with the business district of the Castro and eventually include 500 bronze plaques.

The main business section of Castro Street from Market to 19th Street was under reconstruction and repaving in 2014 to address a number of neighborhood concerns. The area has heavy vehicular traffic, as well as many visitors. As part of the work, the sidewalks were widened and new trees were planted. Additionally, 20 historical cement etchings covering from the inception to the area being settled to the 2010s sweeping gay marriage movement victories were installed in September 2014.

=== Castro Street History Walk ===
A separate sidewalk installation, the Castro Street History Walk (CSHW), is a series of twenty historical fact plaques about the neighborhood—ten from pre-1776 to the 1960s before the Castro became known as a gay neighborhood, and ten "significant events associated with the queer community in the Castro"—contained within the 400 and 500 blocks of the street between 19th and Market streets. They were installed at the same time as the inaugural twenty RHW plaques. The CSHW goes in chronological order starting at Harvey Milk Plaza at Market Street, up to 19th Street, and returning on the opposite side of Castro Street. The $10,000 CSHW was paid for by the Castro Business District (CBD) which "convened a group of local residents and historians to work with Nicholas Perry, a planner and urban designer at the San Francisco Planning Department who worked on the sidewalk-widening project and lives in the Castro" to develop the facts. Each fact was required to be about the neighborhood or the surrounding Eureka Valley. The facts are limited to 230 characters, and were installed in pairs along with a single graphic reminiscent of the historic Castro Theater.

==== Timeline ====
- Pre-1776: the native Yelamu, a tribelet of Ohlone people from the San Francisco Bay Area in Northern California. "The western people" was used by east bay Ohlone to describe the Ohlone people living on the San Francisco Peninsula.
- 1776: Juan Bautista de Anza 's establishes Mission Dolores.
- 1846: The last Mexican Alcalde of Yerba Buena (San Francisco) is granted the area later named as Eureka Valley.
- 1854: John M. Horner buys some of the ranch.
- 1895: Transit improvements, including the Castro St. cable car, spur settlement by working class Irish, German, and Scandinavian families in the late 19th century.
- 1900: Most Holy Redeemer Church is founded
- 1907: Music/event venue Swedish American Hall opens.
- 1918: The Twin Peaks Tunnel is established linking the neighborhood with West Portal.
- 1922: Well-known local architect Timothy Pflueger's first-designed theater, the Castro Theatre, opens.
- 1935: Hans K Lund, the original owner of the Missouri Mule, opens for business.
- 1943: Area resident Norwegian-American author Kathryn Forbes's novel, Mama's Bank Account uses Castro Street as its setting.
- 1953: After 18 years in business Hans K. Lund and wife Margaret would sell the Missouri Mule to Berkeley police officer Wayne Knutila and Del Martin and Phyllis Lyon lesbian power-couple establish a Castro Street home.
- 1963: Marks the second sale of The Missouri Mule which would close its doors for just long enough to expand, rebrand and reopen its doors later that same year, choosing to keep the bar's original established name. An influx of LGBTQ residents and businesses, led by the neighborhood's first "openly" gay bar, The Missouri Mule, transforms the area into the Castro we know today.
- 1972: Twin Peaks Tavern, the U.S.'s first gay bar to have open-glass windows, opens.
- 1978: The community mourns the Milk-Moscone assassinations by gathering by the thousands in the Castro for a candlelight march.
- 1979: White Night Riots take place in May after Dan White is not convicted of first-degree murder for the Milk-Moscone assassinations.
- 1981: Community activist Bobbi Campbell aka Sister Florence Nightmare, flyers the pharmacy with an alert about "gay cancer".
- 1987: the NAMES Project AIDS Memorial Quilt has its first home courtesy of activist Cleve Jones on Market Street.
- 1998: The Bay Area Reporter famously runs banner headline—"No Obits" after thousands of HIV/AIDS deaths.

== LGBTQ tourism ==
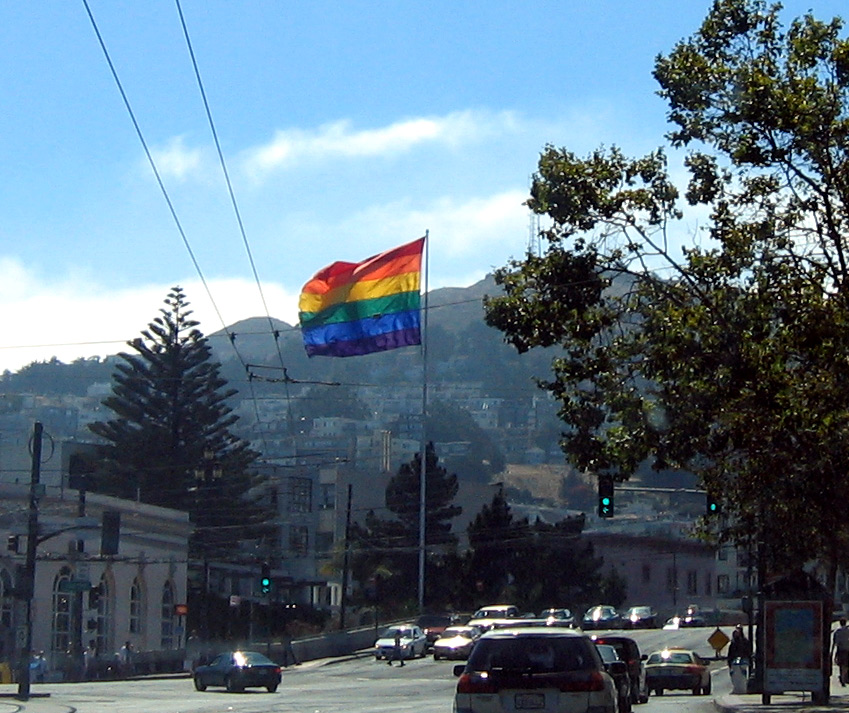
Pride flag at the southwest corner of Market and Castro Streets

San Francisco has a large and thriving tourist economy due to ethnic and cultural communities such as Chinatown, North Beach, Haight-Ashbury and the Castro. The Castro is a site of economic success that brings in capital all year round with many events catered to the LGBTQ community along with everyday business.

The Castro is a "thriving marketplace for all things gay" meaning the area caters to people who identify with LGBTQ culture and other associated meanings to the word gay. There are cafes, the Castro Theater, and many businesses that cater to or openly welcome LGBT consumers. These establishments make the Castro an area of high spending and lead to high tourist traffic. In addition to the city's locals, people travel to visit the shops and restaurants as well as the events that take place, such as the Castro Street Fair. Events such as the fair drum up business for the community and bring in people from all over the nation who visit solely for the atmosphere the Castro provides. People who do not necessarily feel comfortable expressing themselves in their own community have the freedom to travel to places such as the Castro to escape the alienation and feel accepted. There is a sense of belonging and acceptance that is promoted throughout the district to accommodate non-heteronormative people that many LGBT travelers are attracted to.

The Golden Gate Business Association (GGBA) was created in 1974 to help promote the Castro as a place for tourists, but also San Francisco and LGBT businesses as a whole. The GGBA sought to gain local political power and hoped to achieve their gains through an increase in gay tourism, and the association formed the San Francisco Gay Tourism and Visitor's Bureau in 1983. The LGBT tourism industry drives and benefits the economy due to the constant influx of consumers.

== In popular culture ==
"The Trouble with Trillions" (season 9, episode 20 of The Simpsons) features Fidel Castro learning about the area of Castro Street.

== See also ==
- LGBT culture in San Francisco
- LGBT history in Chinatown, San Francisco
