= Harvey Milk Plaza =

Public plaza in San Francisco

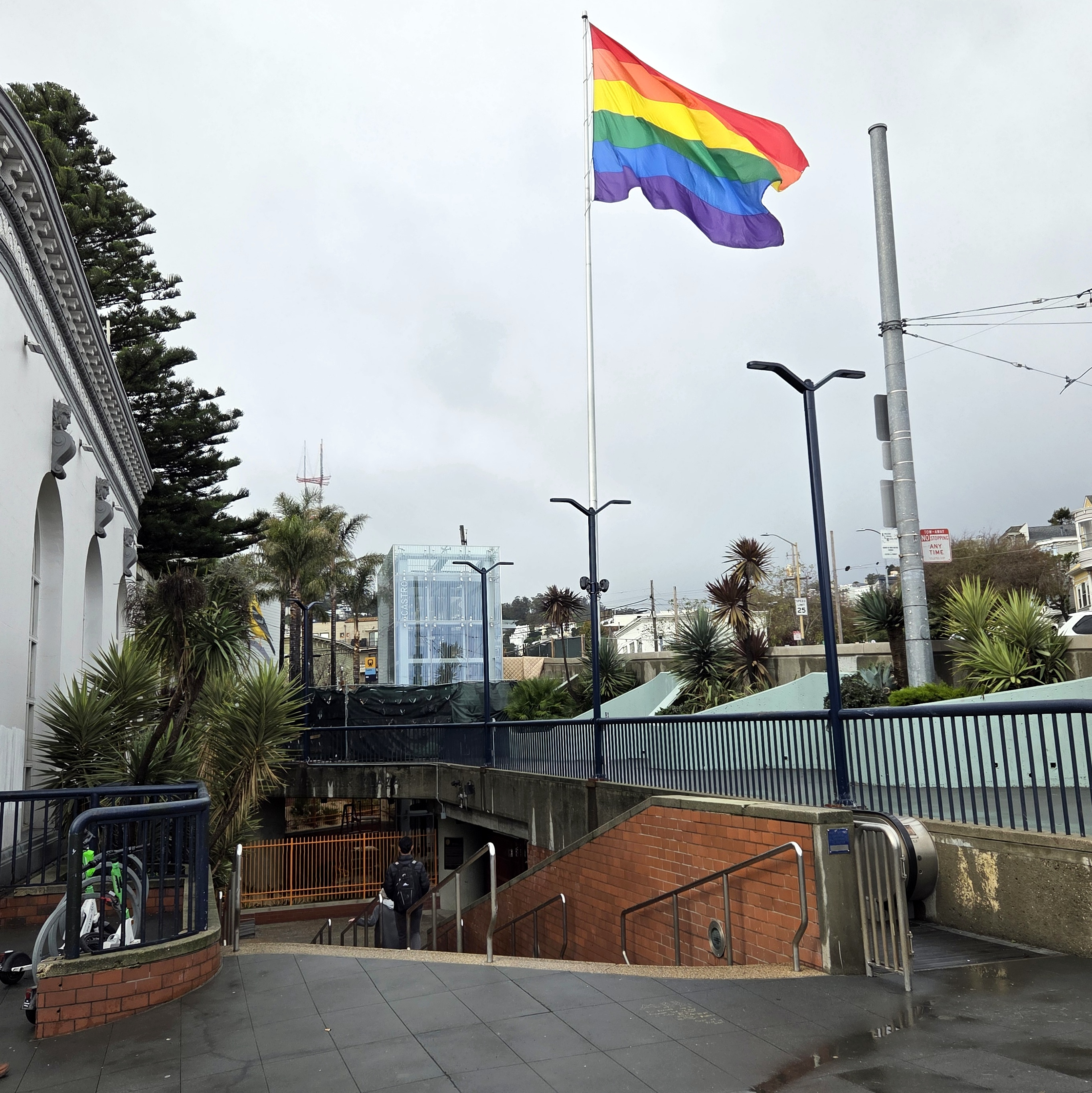
- The rainbow flag flying over Harvey Milk Plaza
- Interactive map of Harvey Milk Plaza
- Location: California, United States
- Coordinates: 37.762401°N 122.435339°W
- Type: Plaza
- Dedicated to: Harvey Milk

Harvey Milk Plaza is a plaza commemorating Harvey Milk in the Castro District of San Francisco, California, United States. Located at the intersection of Market Street, Castro Street, and 17th Street, it serves as the southern entrance to Castro station.

== History ==
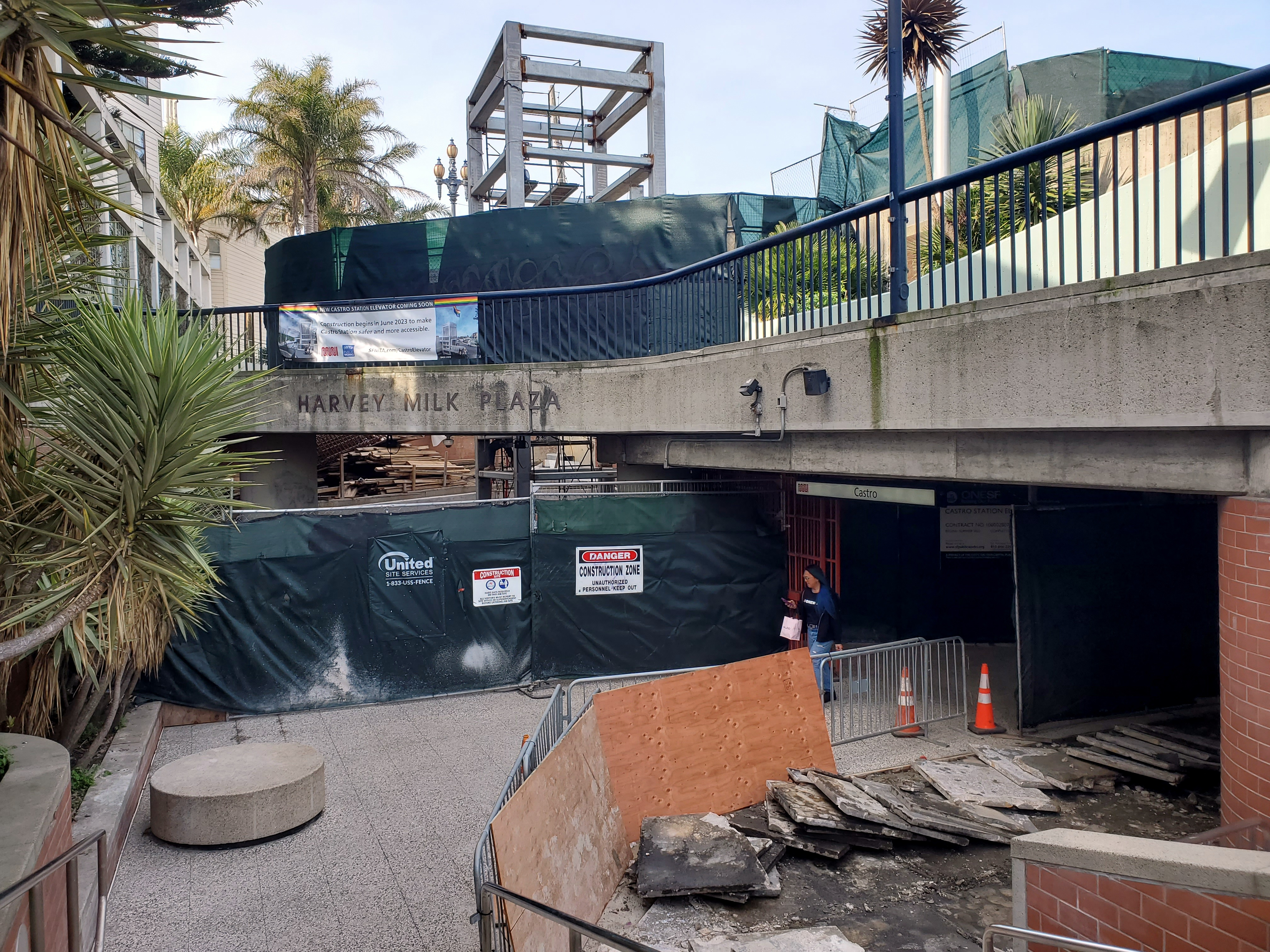
Elevator construction in the plaza in 2025

Harvey Milk, the site's namesake, was a gay man who moved to Castro District of San Francisco in 1972 and became a community activist. In 1977, Milk was elected to the San Francisco Board of Supervisors to represent what was then District 5, which included The Castro. Eleven months later, Milk and mayor George Moscone were assassinated at San Francisco City Hall. In response, the community sought to recognize Milk by renaming the above-ground construction related to Castro station, which opened in 1980, to be "Harvey Milk Plaza". In 1985, the plaza was officially dedicated to Milk. In 1997, to celebrate the 20th anniversary of Harvey Milk's election to the SF Board of Supervisors, a flagpole dedicated to Milk and the openly LGBTQ politicians who followed was added to the site. The flagpole flies the Rainbow flag, an LGBTQ community symbol, which was designed in the neighborhood by artist Gilbert Baker. In 2006, photographs from various stages of Milk's life were installed in the plaza and "blessed" by the Sisters of Perpetual Indulgence.

Castro station and Harvey Milk Plaza were designed by the architectural firm Reid & Tarics Associates. Howard Grant AIA is reported to have been in charge of design. In 2016, SFMTA announced plans for a large project to increase accessibility for the Castro Muni Station located under the plaza. The announcement led to the formation of The Friends of Harvey Milk Plaza, a group of community members advocating for community involvement in the redesign effort. In 2017, the Friends of Harvey Milk Plaza and the American Institute of Architects (AIASF) launched a design competition for the plaza. In 2017, designs were submitted to renovate the plaza. The winning submission belonged to architecture firm Perkins Eastman who went on to produce some initial design concepts for the project.

In 2019, the Harvey Milk Plaza project secured a $1M grant from the State of California intended to “support construction of LGBTQ space in Harvey Milk Plaza.” In 2021, the Friends of Harvey Milk Plaza announced the selection of landscape architecture firm SWA to serve as the new design lead for the project. By March 2024, the project had secured $4.3 million ($1 million private and $3.3 million public) of the estimated $53 million project cost. City voters approved a bond measure that included $25 million for the project in November 2024. In June 2025, the city indicated that design modifications would allow the project to be covered by existing funding, though some elements might be deferred pending additional funds. Construction was expected to begin in late 2026.
