= Halloween in the Castro =

Former San Francisco event

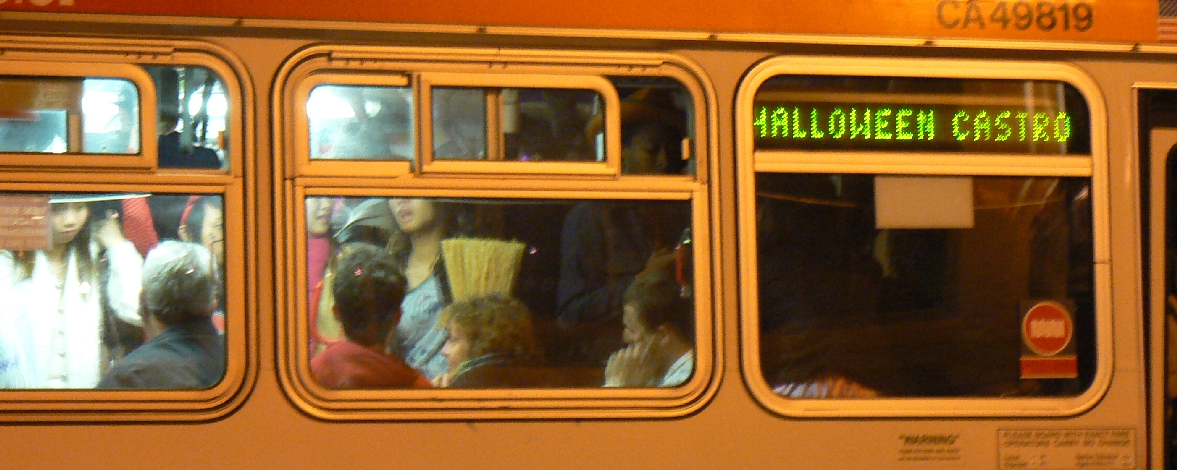
2006, the last year of the large organized street party, a crowded city bus with the destination "Halloween Castro."

Halloween in the Castro was an annual Halloween celebration held in The Castro district of San Francisco, first held in the 1940s as a neighborhood costume contest. By the late 1970s, it had shifted from a children's event to a gay pride celebration that continued to grow into a massive annual street party in the 2000s.

In 2006, a mass shooting wounded nine people, prompting the city to call off the event.

San Francisco's gay Halloween celebration in the early 1960s originally centered on the early gay bars in the Tenderloin district. They had moved there from the North Beach neighborhood which continues to be a magnet for adult entertainment and nightlife. In the late 1960s, the celebration was centered on Grant Avenue in North Beach. From 1970 to 1978, the Halloween celebration was held on Polk Street in Polk Gulch. In 1977, gay-bashers clashed with police and tear-gas was used to disperse the crowds.

By 1979, the city's gay village had moved to the Castro and "gay Mardi Gras" followed. The event became known as the leading Halloween celebration in the U.S., where costumes ranged from "the outrageous to the spectacular". By 2002, Halloween crowds had grown to the hundreds of thousands and became difficult to control.

== History ==
=== Children's Halloween ===
In 1948, Cliff's Variety Store began hosting a children's Halloween festival that featured a costume contest and ice cream-eating contest. By 1979, the Children's Halloween ended as the neighborhood's population shifted from families with children to more single men. In the mid-1990s, the Sisters of Perpetual Indulgence revived Children's Halloween with an annual party held at the Eureka Valley Recreation Center, including a costume contest and gifts from Cliff's.

=== Halloween migrates from the Tenderloin to the Castro ===
Halloween in the Castro was tied to the LGBT culture of San Francisco and began in the 1950-1960s in the Tenderloin/Polk Street area of the city where the mainstream gay bars were first centralized. The event traces its history to the ostracism of LGBT people in the first half of the 20th century from mainstream culture which led to community identity and using gay bars as a focal point for socializing, networking and organizing politically. In the late 1940s after World War II, the San Francisco Bay Area became a haven for LGBT military personnel who didn't want to go back to their old lives. In the 1950s, a group of gay bars in San Francisco's Tenderloin area helped to create a strip of venues for "sex, drugs and late night fun". There has also been a South-of-Market (SoMa) leather subculture and BDSM bar scene with gay-focussed sex clubs sharing Folsom street, a tradition which is carried on with the annual Folsom Street Fair. The nearby business- and tourist-oriented area, Union Square, was also popular for cruising for sex and was open to gay men whereas the Tenderloin was where drag queens, t-girls and prostitutes of all orientations were known to congregate publicly in the city, because they were unwelcome in gay bars at that time.

=== Halloween in the Tenderloin, North Beach and on Polk Street ===
Halloween in the Tenderloin grew in the early 1960s with the growing LGBT community and welcomed tourists, upon whom many of the prostitutes and hustlers relied for income. By the late 1960s, a major celebration area during Halloween was along Grant Avenue in North Beach, on which there were many gay bars in the late 1960s between Broadway and Union. By 1969, San Francisco had more gay people per capita than any American city; when the National Institute of Mental Health asked the Kinsey Institute to survey homosexuals, the Kinsey Institute chose San Francisco. Beginning in 1970, an annual Halloween celebration was held on Polk Street in Polk Gulch, then still the most important gay neighborhood. By the mid-1970s, Polk Street was overwhelmed and closed to traffic for a few hours each Halloween to make room for the costumed revelry. In 1979, the adult gay Halloween party moved to Castro Street in The Castro which, by the early 1970s, had replaced Polk Gulch as San Francisco's most important gay neighborhood.

=== Halloween as a "gay" holiday ===
In the 1970s, the LGBT community moved to the Castro with a string of gay bars opening up and multitudes of gay men filing the sidewalks of the small business district. The Castro became the home of the Halloween event starting in 1979 amid concerns of gay bashing at the Polk street event in the Tenderloin.

There are differing and complementary ideas on why LGBT communities, and expressly, gay men, are attracted to the holiday. Throughout the 1980s, Halloween street events in gay villages Key West, Florida, Christopher Street in New York, Santa Monica Boulevard in West Hollywood and the Castro in San Francisco have evolved from informal parades into Mardi Gras-like events with "drinking and dancing and carrying on in the streets". San Francisco's Polk street Halloween developed in the 1970s as people came out and moved to Castro street in 1979. In addition to stereotypes about why LGBT people are attracted to fashion, theatricality and dressing up there are cultural reasons why the events have become "the major holiday" for LGBT people. In addition to the holiday's pagan roots, which is attractive to those who have been shunned by mainstream religions, many LGBT people are able to be outrageous and flamboyant even if they remain closeted. In the days before gay liberation, wearing masks symbolized that most gays were in the closet—if gays were interviewed on TV before 1969, they often wore masks so no one would know their real identity.

According to Bruce Mailman, a gay events organizer, "public partying on Halloween fits into gay liberation in general, being seen and heard" in a heteronormative society where media watchdog groups like GLAAD have had to campaign to ensure that LGBT people are portrayed and done so accurately without perpetuating negative stereotypes. In addition to visibility issues there is also escapism components as the LGBT community dealt with the AIDS pandemic and faced the generally negative domestic policy of the Reagan administration towards LGBT people and the AIDS crisis that was impacting the gay male communities.

=== Sisters of Perpetual Indulgence ===
The Sisters of Perpetual Indulgence, promoting the 1995 HallowQueen charity event, a part of helping move Halloween in the Castro out of the neighborhood by staging a costume-mandatory party in the SoMa district instead.

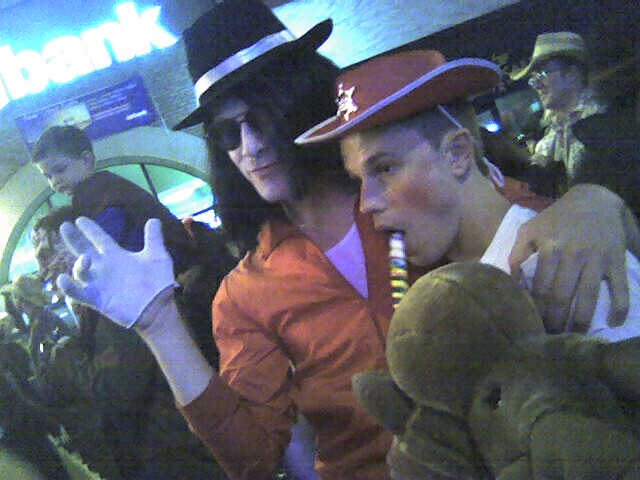
2006 attendees dressed as Michael Jackson and a young boy, likely in reference to the 2005 Trial of Michael Jackson.

On Halloween night in 1989, two weeks after San Francisco was devastated by the 6.9 (Richter scale) Loma Prieta earthquake, the Sisters performed street theater and used donation buckets to collect thousands of dollars for the mayor's Earthquake Relief Fund from the Halloween crowds that poured into The Castro for the massive street party. The group formally added donation gates, a stage and structure to safely manage the event from 1990 to 1995, until "drunken gay-bashers out to get their kicks" convinced the group the event was unsafe without official city support. In 1995, the Sisters agreed to host a costume-mandatory dance, HallowQueen, in a SoMa gay nightclub – which raised over $6000 for charities – as their contribution to helping move the event out of the mostly residential neighborhood. In multi-year planning discussions on how to address the events challenges, some Sisters cited New York City's Village Halloween Parade, the United States' largest Halloween celebration, as an example of the potential for the event to attract tourists and benefit local businesses as well. Barbara Ehrenreich, in her book on collective joy mentions this as an example of how Halloween is changing from a children's holiday to an adult holiday and compares it to Mardi Gras. Halloween is now the United States' second most popular holiday (after Christmas) for decorating; the sale of candy and costumes is also extremely common during the holiday, which is marketed to children and adults alike.

=== 2000 to 2010 ===
Poster for Halloween in the Castro 2005 featuring spokesperson Donna Sachet.

A decade later, San Francisco still struggled to manage the event. The massive crowds quickly overwhelmed the streets, mass transit and because of the Castro's location along two major transport corridors, disrupting traffic flow well outside the neighborhood.

In 2002, 500,000 people celebrated Halloween in the Castro and four people were stabbed. In 2003, the city's Entertainment Commission took responsibility for organizing the event. As part of its efforts, the City permitted the March of Light Halloween Parade to drive Art Cars and Costumed Revelers through the center of the event to provide a positive focus and celebratory moments for the event.

In 2006, nine people were wounded when a shooter opened fire at the celebration. Halloween in the Castro was canceled, and in the following years a heavy police presence kept the event from happening spontaneously. In 2007, 600 police were deployed in the Castro on Halloween, a practice that continued in 2009 according to a police press release that announced a "zero tolerance policy for public drinking and other crime". By 2010, the city had cracked down completely on Halloween in the Castro, directing celebrants to various balls and parties elsewhere.

=== Halloween in the Castro, The Opera (2009) ===
In 2009, in response to continuing violence and political complications surrounding Halloween in San Francisco, the Lesbian/Gay Chorus of San Francisco produced an opera about Halloween in the Castro, called Halloween in the Castro, composed by Jack Curtis Dubowsky. The opera ran in the Castro at the Metropolitan Community Church (then located on 18th Street) for two weeks, culminating in a final performance on Halloween night. The opera, whilst framed as "a horror opera", lampooned city policies, such as "closing" the Castro while allowing the bars to remain open, and closing the Castro MUNI station. The opera featured a Sister who recounted past years of hosting the event and its decline into violence caused by gawking outsiders as the event grew beyond a manageable size. The Sisters of Perpetual Indulgence, through their 2009 Pink Saturday Grants program, donated money to support the opera.

=== Since 2011 ===
In hindsight, the Sisters were seen as a bargain of sorts, raising money every year for charity without city funds while keeping the chaos under control by providing entertainment and structure. They continue to stage and consult on large city events like Folsom Street Fair and Pink Saturday. The city, through the Entertainment Commission established in the early 2000s, is charged with addressing the ongoing issues of Halloween in the city with widespread agreement the Castro can no longer be the focus of a citywide celebration.

In 2011, the City of San Francisco's official site on the topic stated:

Halloween belongs to all of us. Following last year's successful campaign to keep everyone safe and maintain the Castro's tranquility, we're continuing and expanding the Home for Halloween campaign. Like last year there is no party or special event in the Castro. However, there are lots of events and celebrations around San Francisco, throughout the Bay Area and right in your own "home" neighborhood!

This October 31st, bars and restaurants in the Castro will be open for business. However, as was the case last year the streets will not be closed to traffic. As in every other community in the City, there will be zero tolerance for behavior which doesn't respect the celebrated diversity of our communities. And again like last year, there will be zero tolerance for individuals and businesses that do not obey alcohol consumption and distribution regulations. The Home For Halloween website will help promote your events so please let us know about what you have planned in your community.

The Castro is not appropriate for a party with 100,000 people. So, the Home For Halloween campaign enters its second year of celebrating Halloween throughout the Bay Area and encouraging people to respect everyone's home, including the Castro. With your support, we can indeed make Halloween a "home" for celebrations that are fun, festive and respectful. Halloween is for everyone.

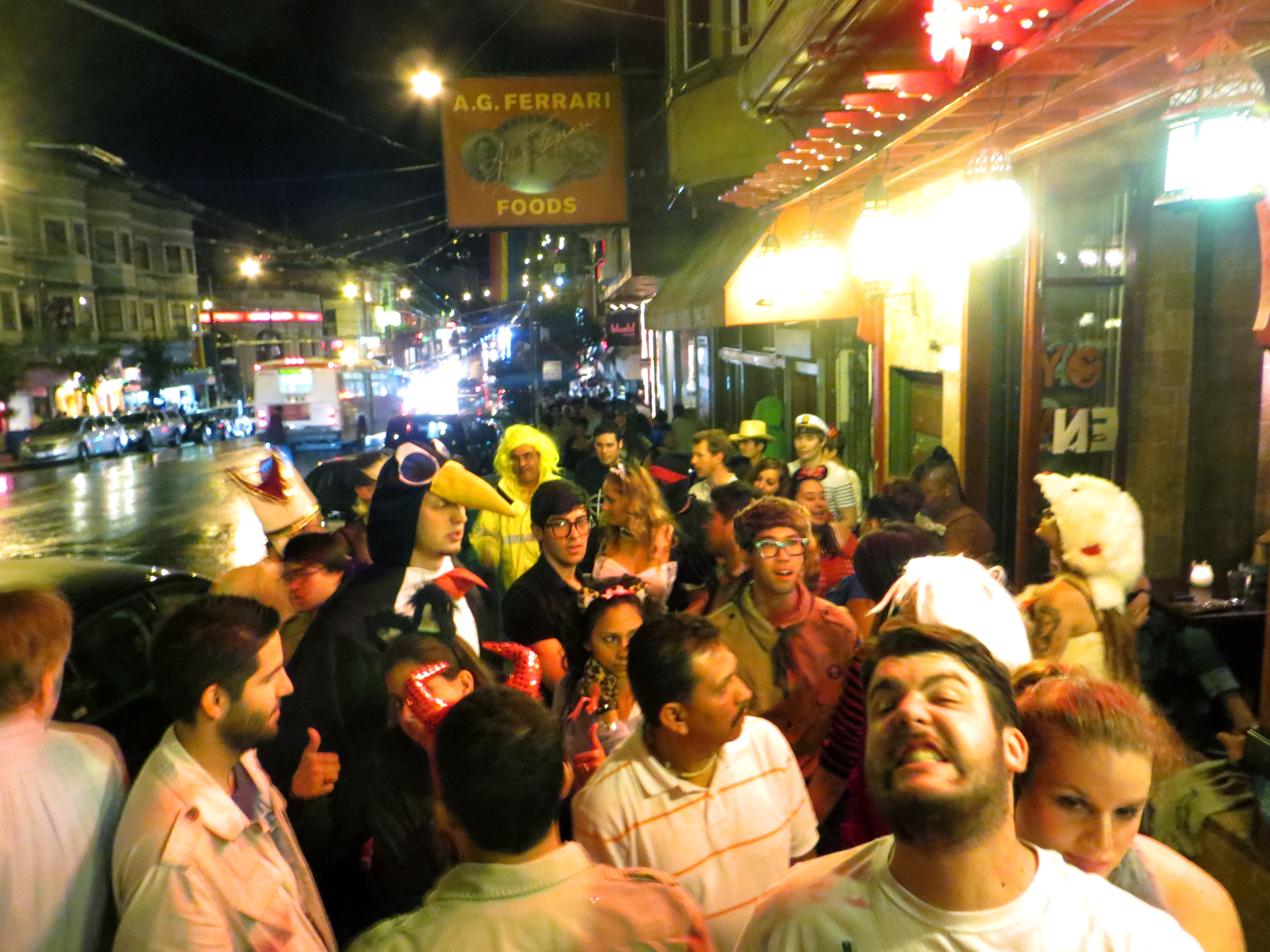
2012 Halloween at the Castro, likely an unofficial bar crawl.

The COVID-19 pandemic in 2020 caused the celebration to be shut down.

== Legacy ==
In 2007, the event was lampooned in adult animated series The Nutshack, which parodied Filipino-American culture in San Francisco. It is heavily referenced and portrayed in Halloween episode "The Slasher." Explaining the event, a character states, "[Castro] is like Carnival or Mardi Gras, just with more gay people."

== Bibliography ==
- Bullough, Vern L. (2002), Before Stonewall: Activists for Gay and Lesbian Rights in Historical Context, New York, Haworth Press ISBN 1-56023-193-9
- Clendinen, Dudley, and Nagourney, Adam (1999), Out for Good: The Struggle to Build a Gay Rights Movement in America, Simon & Schuster ISBN 0-684-81091-3
- D'Emilio, John (1983), Sexual Politics, Sexual Communities: The Making of a Homosexual Minority in the United States, 1940–1970, Chicago, University of Chicago Press ISBN 0-226-14265-5
- de Jim, Strange (2003), ..San Francisco's Castro, Arcadia Publishing ISBN 978-0-7385-2866-3
- Gorman, Michael R. (1998), The Empress is a Man: Stories From the Life of José Sarria, New York, Harrington Park Press: an imprint of Haworth Press ISBN 0-7890-0259-0 (paperback edition)
- Lockhart, John (2002), The Gay Man's Guide to Growing Older, Los Angeles, Alyson Publications ISBN 1-55583-591-0
- Marcus, Eric (1992), Making History: The Struggle for Gay and Lesbian Equal Rights 1945 – 1990, An Oral History, New York, HarperCollins ISBN 0-06-016708-4
- Miller, Neil (1995), Out of the Past: Gay and Lesbian History from 1869 to the Present, New York, Vintage Books ISBN 0-09-957691-0
- Shilts, Randy (1982), The Mayor of Castro Street, New York, St. Martin's Press ISBN 0-312-52331-9
- Weiss, Mike (1984), Double Play: The San Francisco City Hall Killings, Addison Wesley Publishing Company ISBN 0-201-09595-5
- Witt, Lynn, Sherry Thomas and Eric Marcus (1995), Out in All Directions: The Almanac of Gay and Lesbian America, New York, Warner Books ISBN 0-446-67237-8
