= Sisters of Perpetual Indulgence =

LGBTQ activism movement started in San Francisco

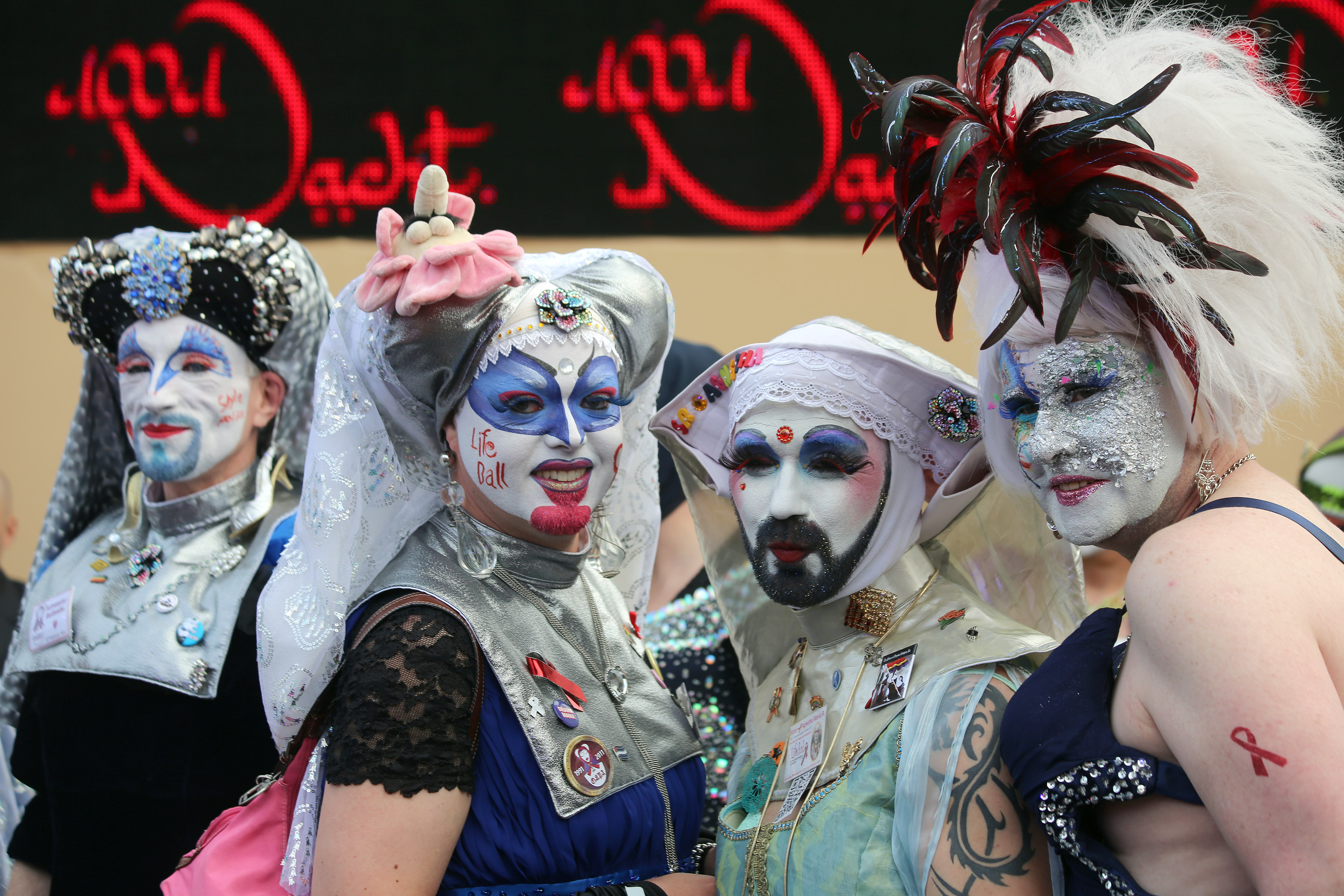
- Formation: 1979; 47 years ago
- Founded at: San Francisco, California, United States
- Purpose: LGBTQ activism
- Method: Events, campaigning, advocacy, charity, religious satire
- Website: thesisters.org

The Sisters of Perpetual Indulgence (SPI), also called Order of Perpetual Indulgence (OPI), is a charitable, protest, and street performance movement that uses drag and religious imagery to satirize issues of sex, gender, and morality (particularly Christian perspectives on these topics) and fundraise for charity. In 1979, a small group of gay men in San Francisco began wearing the attire of Catholic nuns in visible situations using camp to promote various social and political causes in the Castro District.

From the original organization in San Francisco, the Sisters have grown throughout the U.S., Canada, Australia, Europe, and South America, and are now an international network of autonomous orders. These orders are mostly registered as non-profit charity organizations that raise money for AIDS, LGBTQ-related causes, and mainstream community service organizations, while promoting safer sex and educating others about the harmful effects of drug use and other high risk behaviors. They have also protested many Christian, and specifically Catholic, events perceived as anti-LGBTQ, including the visit of Pope John Paul II to the United States.

Throughout the movement's history there have been a number of conflicts with Christian communities. The group has been characterized by several Catholic clergy, organizations and laypeople (such as the Catholic League for Religious and Civil Rights) as anti-Catholic and a hate-group for impersonating and mocking Catholic practices and beliefs, including religious sisters.

== Inception ==
The Sisters of Perpetual Indulgence made their first appearance on Castro Street in San Francisco in 1979. Their approach and appearance was not new or extraordinary for the place or time. Starting in the 1960s, the Castro District began transitioning from a working class Irish Catholic district going through significant economic decline. A gay bar opened on Market Street and gradually, gay men began to migrate to the neighborhood. By 1977, between 100,000 and 200,000 had moved to San Francisco from all over the United States, changing the political and cultural profile of the city. The Castro was also known for the outrageous characters who were 1970s mainstays, such as Jesus Christ Satan and The Cosmic Lady, who endeared themselves to local residents with their unique perspectives, particularly during street events such as the Castro Street Fair and Halloween in the Castro. At the same time, religious participation in politics appeared in the late 1970s with the activism of Anita Bryant, and Jerry Falwell's establishment of the Moral Majority. The Castro District had been publicized nationally as a major gay neighborhood and was targeted by evangelists who took weekly trips to loudly preach to the residents about the immorality of homosexuality.

On April 14, 1979 (Saturday of Easter weekend), three men (Ken Bunch, Fred Brungard, and a friend) dressed as nuns with habits, that Bunch had acquired several years before, walked through the Castro. Later Bunch and Burngard with a different friend, Agnes de Garron a.k.a. Edmund Garron, appeared at a gay softball game in habit and with pom poms. At the annual Castro Street Fair on August 19, 1979, Sister Adhanarisvara (Bunch) and Sister Missionary Position (Brungard) along with Sister Solicitation (de Garron) and Reverend Mother, the Abbess (Bill Graham) announced the order and started recruiting. Later that year, de Garron designed habits for the members while the group discussed what to do. Initially, they made postcards and greeting cards depicting them in their habits which they handed out with a requested donation to cover costs. Either at the end of 1979 or beginning of 1980, the group decided on a name, Sisters of Perpetual Indulgence. Their first protest as an official order was joining an anti-nuclear march in March 1980 with habits and pom poms and reciting their "Rosary in Time of Nuclear Peril".

In August 1980, they confronted the evangelists: a dozen men dressed in 14th century Belgian nun's robes and habits, and according to one participant, Sister Missionary Position, "a teensy bit of make-up so as not to be dowdy on a Friday night", met the evangelists at Harvey Milk Plaza. One recited a litany asking among other things for "mercy on the self-righteous who take away our liberty". The evangelist left but then returned in a larger group to be met by the sisters dancing and reciting the litany. The next day at a larger evangelical event including a Christian band the sisters joined in the dancing and flirted with the evangelists.

In October 1980, the dozen or so Sisters held their first fundraiser, a bingo game and a disco and salsa dance that was well-attended in large part because of the write-up in The San Francisco Chronicle by Herb Caen the same day, who printed their organization name, the Sisters of Perpetual Indulgence. The benefit was for San Francisco's Metropolitan Community Church gay Cuban refugee program, and it netted $1,500 ($5,328 in 2022).

== Structure and methods ==
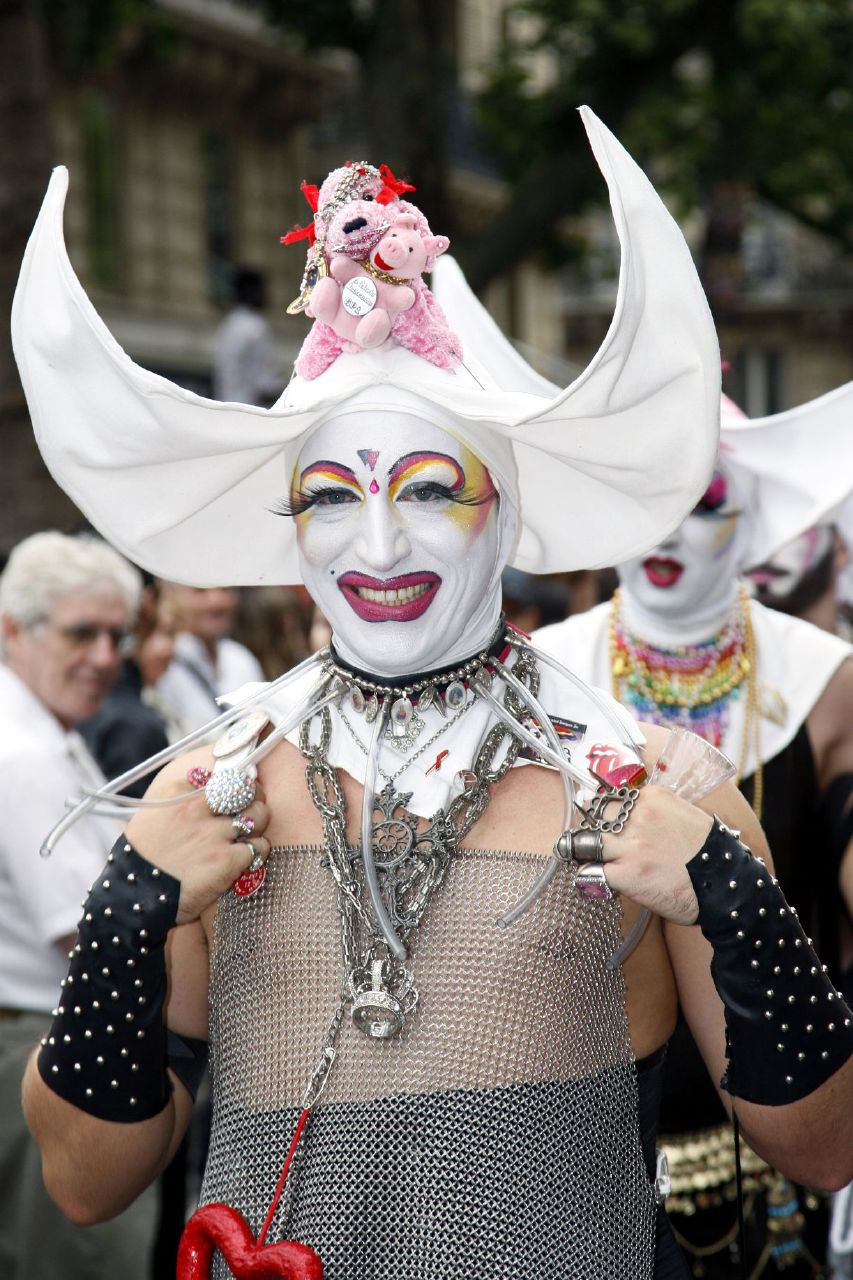
Sister Innocenta (Sœur Innocenta) of the Sisters of Perpetual Indulgence, Paris House, France (Les Sœurs de la Perpétuelle Indulgence—Couvent de Paris) at Paris Pride, 2007.

Members of the Sisters of Perpetual Indulgence include people who identify with a variety of sexual orientations and genders, although the majority are gay men. Joining an order mirrors the steps for joining a traditional order of nuns. Potential members are encouraged to attend organizational meetings as aspirants, and told that if they are not intending to make a lifelong commitment they should seriously reconsider. After showing intent and being approved by the order, an aspirant is promoted to a postulant and is expected to learn about the history of the organization and continue to work behind the scenes for at least six months. Postulants are not allowed to wear nun's attire, but may instead dress in "festive garb that fits in with Order", according to the Sisters' website. If the members approve of the postulant, a fully indoctrinated member may act as a sponsor and the postulant is promoted to a novice. Novices are allowed to wear white veils and whiteface make-up. This phase lasts another six months during which the novice is expected to work within the organization and plan an event. If three-fourths of the order agrees, the novice is promoted to a full member of the group.

After their inception, the Sisters soon spread to other cities within the U.S. as a loosely connected network of mostly autonomous houses. There are thirteen houses and six missions in various cities across the U.S. Globally, 600 members work for established houses or missions in Australia, Canada, Colombia, France, Germany, Switzerland, the United Kingdom, and Uruguay. Chapters founded outside the United States would also become involved in local issues. Whilst the United Kingdom chapter was involved in protests against police hostility towards the lesbian and gay community and safe-sex education, the chapter was also involved in campaigning unrelated to LGBT+ issues, such as protests against Poll Tax, the Gulf War, and the 1984–85 UK miners' strike. The San Francisco Founding House anchors much of the activities and continues to be the largest and most well-funded. The San Francisco House (SPI, Inc.) also holds the registered trademarks for "Sisters of Perpetual Indulgence" and the "laughing nun head" logo.

In San Francisco, the Sisters of Perpetual Indulgence not only made their first appearance but also became interwoven in the cultural and political fabric of the city, according to scholar Cathy Glenn in the journal Theory and Event. Glenn uses the examples of San Francisco as a society of hyperpluralism, where all the groups who have called the city their home have successfully maintained their individual identities, creating a culture defined by counterculture and at times marked by political violence. The Sisters use Catholic imagery as simultaneous inspiration and fodder for parody through camp. They choose names based on the process of renaming women inducted into Catholic orders, but that suggest sexual promiscuity or that are based in absurdity: Sister Anita Blowjob, Sister GladAss of the Joyous Reserectum, Sister Hellena Handbasket, Sister Sensible Shoes, and Sister Homo Celestial, among others. They wear wimples, habits, and robes of nuns, but accessorize them with baubles, beads, and whiteface make-up. Sister Phyllis Stein, the Fragrant Mistress of Sistory, asserts that there is a clear distinction between drag queens and members of the Sisters of Perpetual Indulgence: "We're not dressed as girls, we're dressed as nuns... We definitely minister to the spiritual needs of our community, while drag queens sort of focus on camp and fun within our communities. We're very different communities. A lot of people refer to us as drag queens, but we say we're in nun drag. We are nuns."

Sister Irma Geddon of the Portland, Oregon-based Order of Benevolent Bliss offered her view of the efficacy of using nun's clothing and drag: "The lightness of everything, in addition to the whiteface and the nun's habits, are a mechanism to reach out to people. When we're dressed up like that, kind of like sacred clowns, it allows people to interact with us."

== Activism ==
=== AIDS education ===
The organization of the Sisters of Perpetual Indulgence occurred at the same time HIV/AIDS began appearing in the Castro District and New York City. Safe havens during the AIDS crisis came in the form of bars such as Maud's and Amelia's, but these were shut down, as at the time many people believed bars were places were everyone had AIDS or could get it very easily. Some of the earliest attempts to bring attention to the new disease were staged by the Sisters, both in and out of costume. During the pandemic, the Sisters tried to fill the supportive role for the LGBTQ community that churches, the government, and families had repudiated. The Sisters staged one of the earliest fundraisers for HIV/AIDS in June 1982, and continued to raise money through the 1980s for AIDS victims.

==== Play Fair! ====
In 1982, Sister Florence Nightmare, RN (early AIDS activist and registered nurse Bobbi Campbell) and Sister Roz Erection (Baruch Golden, a registered nurse) joined with a team of Sisters and medical professionals to create "Play Fair!", the first safer sex pamphlet to use plain language, practical advice and humor. A founder of the Sisters considered "Play Fair!" to be "one of the Order's greatest achievements in community education and support". The zine was illustrated with comics of nuns, colored in black, white, and pink, and was one of the few campaigns at the time to use humor, rather than rules and sex negativity, to talk about AIDS and STIs. The pamphlet included a section on Kaposi’s sarcoma and pneumocystis pneumonia, two symptoms of what would later be described as AIDS, explaining them as part of a host of severe immune system problems that had started to affect some gay men in large cities over the previous two years. The pamphlet also explained gonorrhea, syphilis, herpes, hepatitis, venereal warts, scabies, crabs, and intestinal parasites. One notable inclusion in its STI list was the psychological impact of "guilt." The pamphlet explained guilt's symptoms as "feeling bad after a trip to the baths, bushes, or tearooms; low self-esteem. Seldom asymptomatic" with the cure: "respect and love yourself and others."

During the 1980s, other chapters of the Sisters adapted "Play Fair!" and created new safer sex outreach materials. The Toronto chapter produced two "Cum Clean" STI pamphlets, with comic cover images of the nuns, as well as "Perpetually Indulgent Rainchecks" to destigmatize discussing STI checkups and safer sex while waiting for results. In 1999, for the Sisters' 20th anniversary the "Play Fair!" pamphlet was revised. The Sisters worldwide continue to raise awareness of sexual health; many Orders regularly pass out condoms and participate in events to educate people on sexual health issues.

==== AIDS Memorials ====
Campbell appeared on the cover of Newsweek declaring himself to be the "AIDS poster boy" in 1983. He was active in AIDS education and prevention and split his appearances as himself and Sister Florence Nightmare until his death in 1984. He and three other Castro residents started the AIDS Candlelight Memorial. Losing several members to AIDS in the early 1980s, the Sisters were present at the 1986 Castro Street Fair with less than a dozen members, who sponsored a fund-raising and safer sex education booth that featured pie throwing with the slogan "Cream yer Sister, not yer lover!"

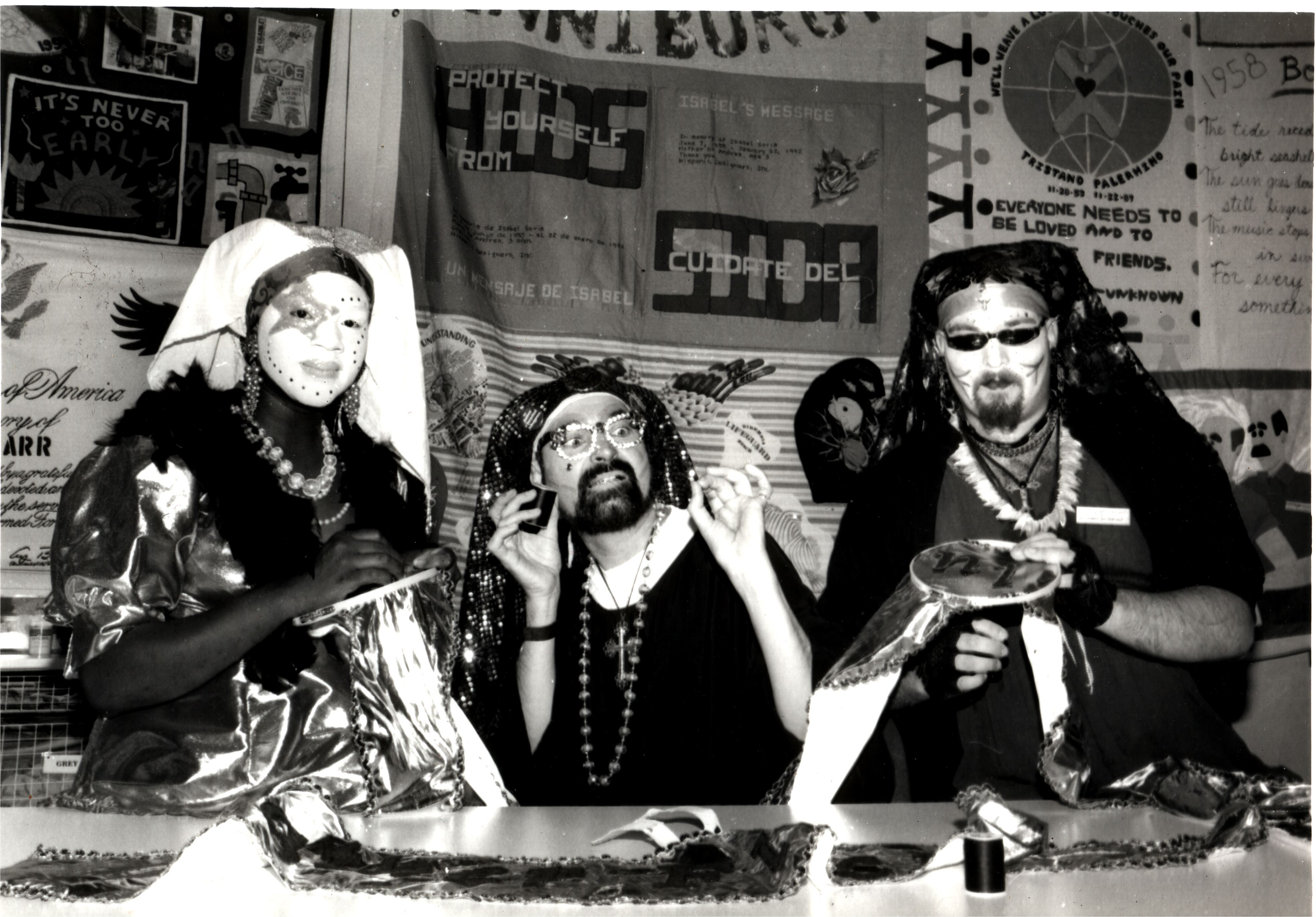
Sister Sistah, Sister Dana Van Iquity and Sister Kitty Catalyst O.C.P. at San Francisco's NAMES Project Quilt office on Market St. working on the Sister's Nuns of the Above memorial quilt.

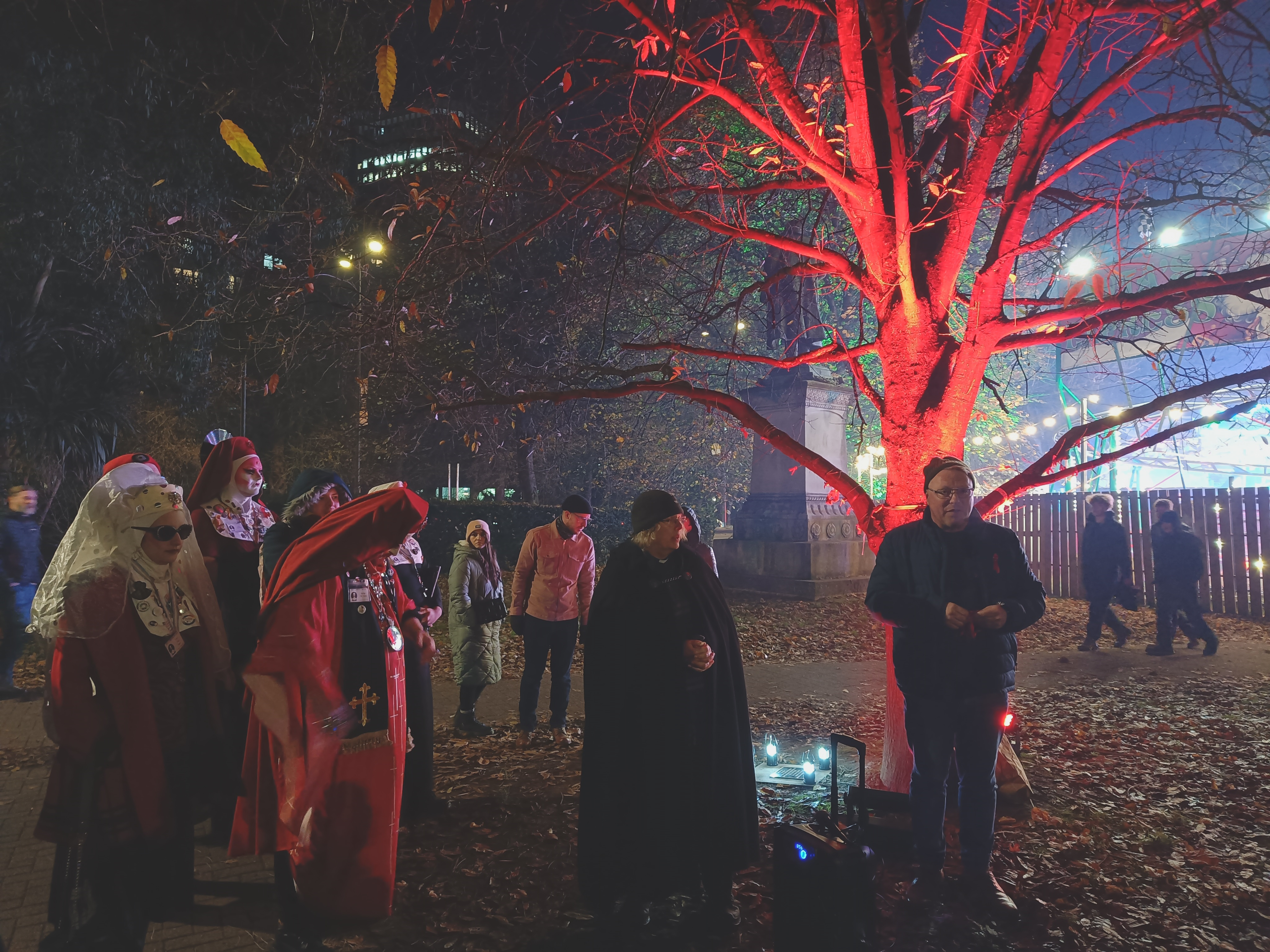
Sisters at the Cardiff Tree of Life, for World AIDS Day commemorations in 2023

Members of the Sisters of Perpetual Indulgence who have died are referred by the Sisters as "Nuns of the Above". Specific losses due to AIDS are recorded in the folk art NAMES Project AIDS Memorial Quilt. Created in the 1985 the quilt has made history several times. It was featured at the 1996 NAMES quilt display in Washington, D.C., in front of the U.S. House of Representatives and was among the first quilts viewed by then Vice President Al Gore and his wife Tipper Gore and later featured in the NAMES Projects' calendar worldwide. The Nuns of The Above quilt itself has been flown around the United States and is in high demand for local displays. While in town for the AIDS Memorial Quilt display the Sisters led an exorcism of homophobia, classism, and racism on the steps of the United States House of Representatives, and assisted with the AIDS Coalition to Unleash Power (ACT-UP) death march and protest, to the gates of the White House where ashes of people who had died from AIDS were illegally spread on the lawn.

=== Political activism, protest, and religious parodies ===
Once founded in 1979, the Sisters of Perpetual Indulgence attracted local attention by attending major LGBTQ events in the Castro District dressed as Catholic nuns.

In 1982, Jack Fertig, known as Sister Boom Boom, ran for San Francisco Board of Supervisors earning over 23,000 votes with her occupation listed as "Nun of the Above". San Francisco passed a law soon after, commonly called the "Sister Boom Boom Law", that all people running for office had to do so with their legal name.

The same year the Sisters attended a Mass at Cathedral of Saint Mary, after which the local Catholic newspaper The Monitor stated the group was degrading towards Catholic nuns, citing Sister Boom Boom's name, and Sister Hysterectoria's. In response to the Sisters' presence in St. Mary's Cathedral, the Archbishop of San Francisco John R. Quinn issued a pastoral letter, stating that the Church condemns homosexual activity, but that homosexual people have to be provided "sound pastoral care" and are ultimately "no different than other Christians", that it was a Christian duty to "stand up against violence directed toward gays and to protect gay civil rights", and that harassment or persecution of homosexual people is incompatible with the Gospel. Some activists praised the letter or considered it "an encouraging sign", while others were critical of it; the Bay Area Reporter criticized it for upholding the traditional church line and suggested that despite a seemingly supportive letter, Quinn still condemned homosexuality in the hope of receiving a "major papal appointment".

Outlined as one of the Sisters' missions "to promulgate universal joy and to expiate stigmatic guilt", the Sisters of Perpetual Indulgence have a history of bringing attention to conservative movements that attempt to shame members of the LGBT community or people with HIV/AIDS. Sisters performed a public exorcism of anti-feminist Phyllis Schlafly that was deliberately timed to take place at Union Square during the 1984 Democratic National Convention, taking place in San Francisco. A Sister dressed as Schlafly was held down as another spoke to the crowd, and other Sisters pulled out rubber snakes from the mock-Schlafly's clothing. Also taking place was Jerry Falwell's Family Forum, hosted by the Moral Majority whose major planks focused on condemning homosexuality, pornography, and abortion. A Sister dressed as Falwell was undressed during the performance to reveal fishnet stockings and a corset in front of an audience of 2,000.

The same year, the Sisters held another mock exorcism, this time of Pope John Paul II, coinciding with his visit to San Francisco, calling it the "Official San Francisco Papal Welcoming Committee". The Sisters claim the action, also taking place in Union Square, earned the organization a spot on the Papal List of Heretics. At the time of the papal visit, the relations between the Catholic and LGBT communities of San Francisco were strained because of a letter by the Dicastery for the Doctrine of the Faith, often called "Ratzinger Letter" in reference to Cardinal Joseph Ratzinger (later Pope Benedict XVI). The letter was considered an attack on the LGBTQ community, with LGBTQ newspaper Bay Area Reporter mocking the letter with a headline "Pope to Gays: 'Drop Dead." Some critics claimed that the letter implied that the LGBTQ community itself is responsible for violence against it, and that homosexual people were responsible for the AIDS crisis. The outrage grasped the entirety of the local LGBTQ community, with the city's newspapers and activist groups ridiculing the pope and publishing mocking cartoons. Massive protests were planned for the date of the papal visit - a petition named "Pope, Stay Home!" was started by gay civil rights groups, and civil suits were filed in attempt to prevent the visit. Amidst these tensions, the "Papal Welcoming Committee" by the Sisters drew huge attention and sparked controversy.

The Archbishop of San Francisco, John R. Quinn, published a clarification to the Ratzinger Letter, stating that the letter was not meant to be an attack on the LGBT community and disputing claims that the letter blamed homophobic violence on homosexuals themselves. Quinn wrote that too much focus was placed on possibly negative aspects of the letter, with many misconceptions emerging as a result. The Archbishop concluded that the letter "affirms the spiritual and human dignity of the homosexual person while placing a negative moral judgment on homosexual acts and a negative philosophical judgment on the homosexual inclination or orientation, which it clearly states is not a sin or moral evil". The archdiocese also started negotiating with the local gay community in order to prevent possible violence during the papal visit; after these negotiations, a press conference was held where the archdiocese was joined by several gay groups such as DignityUSA, where both sides pledged to commit themselves to non-violence. As a result, the threat of massive demonstrations never materialized, and the papal visit was considered a huge success. According to Jeffrey M. Burns, "even the Sisters of Perpetual Indulgence protest went largely unnoticed". Many gay activists as well as gay Catholics attended papal events. The pope visited AIDS patients, and delivered a sermon that was considered an olive branch to the LGBT community, and was received well even by hitherto critical LGBTQ newspapers. In the sermon, John Paul II said: "the all embracing love of God ... God loves you all, without distinction, without limit... He loves those of you who are sick, those who are suffering from AIDS and from AIDS-related complex. He loves the relatives and friends of the sick and those who care for them. He loves us all with an unconditional and ever lasting love ... he loves us in our human condition, with our weaknesses and our needs. Nothing else can explain the mystery of the cross ... The love of Christ is more powerful than sin and death."

Starting in 1995, the Sisters began a Castro Crawl on Easter Sunday to celebrate their anniversary. The event features a 13-stop pub crawl that parodies Stations of the Cross. At each station in front of a gay bar or gay organization, the Sisters call out "We adore thee, O Christ" to be answered by their traveling audience in "Luvya, mean it, let's do brunch". Actors portray the Virgin Mary, Mary Magdalene, and other people integral to Easter traditions, and the Sisters continue to educate for safer sex by passing out condoms, ending the event with a toast of vanilla wafers and Jägermeister.

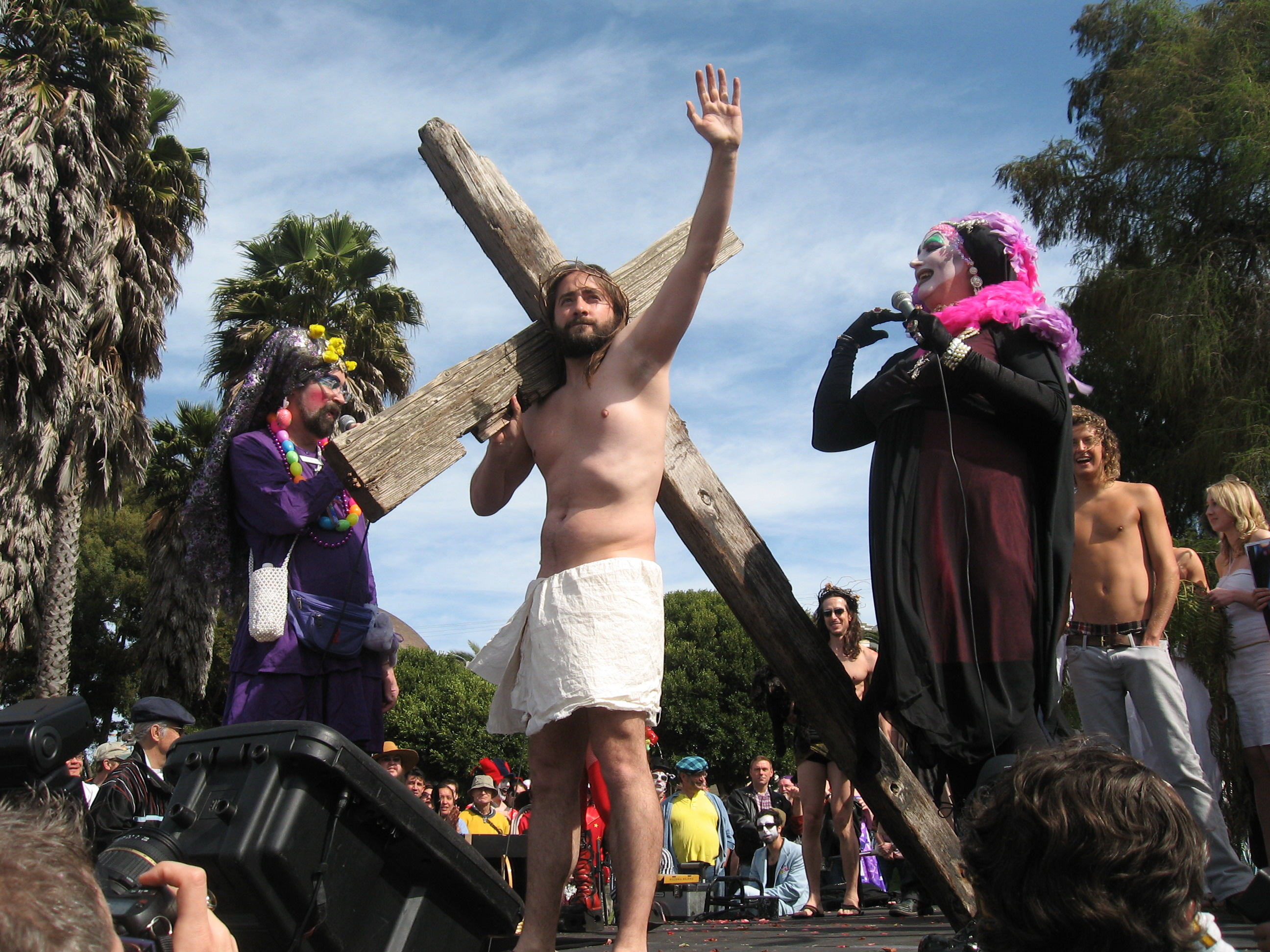
The 28th Anniversary Celebration and community fundraiser held in San Francisco's Dolores Park includes a "Hunky Jesus" competition hosted by Sister Dana Van Iquity and Sister Roma

In 1999, some of the city's Catholic community criticized San Francisco Supervisor Tom Ammiano after the Board of Supervisors, at Ammiano's request, granted the Sisters a permit to close a block of Castro Street for their 20th anniversary celebration on Easter Sunday, which included a "Hunky Jesus" contest among other activities. San Francisco's Catholic archdiocese requested the event be moved to another day. The city's Interfaith Council suggested the following Sunday, which was the Eastern Orthodox Easter. An Archdiocese newspaper compared the Sisters' event to neo-Nazis celebrating on the Jewish holiday of Passover. The controversy sparked a number of responses in The San Francisco Chronicle's letters to the editor, both supporting and disputing the accuracy of the comparison; leaders of the San Francisco Anti-Defamation League chapter wrote in reply that such a characterization was offensive and "trivializes the horrific actions of hate groups". The resulting attention ensured a crowd of 5,000 attendees and what the Sisters claimed to be a million dollars of free publicity. The event raised about $13,000 for the Tenderloin AIDS Resource Center and the San Francisco LGBT Community Center, among various groups. In 2011, gay Catholic writer Andrew Sullivan criticized the organization for hosting its annual "Hunky Jesus" contest on Easter Sunday and described the group as "smug liberal bigots". He also said it empowers prejudices against the LGBT community.

In August 1999, the Sisters were invited to be parade grand marshals at Reno's first Pride Parade. Nevada's Republican governor Kenny Guinn, who had signed a bill in May outlawing discrimination against gays and lesbians in Nevada, refused to sign a proclamation in support of the parade, saying the group "tends to cross the line of decency and appropriateness and would conduct themselves in a manner that would offend people of different religious groups".

Members of the San Diego Order have made a presence at a Christian fundamentalist youth revival meeting called Teen Mania Ministries from 2006 to 2008. Sisters Iona Dubble-Wyde and Freeda Sole stood outside Cox Arena in full regalia to intercept pastors and attendees. The responses from the children and adolescents were varied. While some told the Sisters they were going to hell, others asked questions and offered thanks and hugs; the event was generally reported as positive.

The Sisters were featured in a 2008 book titled Catholic and Queer where they explained that their mode of dress was meant not only to employ the "fabulous attire" that had been forsaken by Catholic non-cloistered orders, but that their dedication to community service is an attempt to "honor and emulate [the] unstinting devotion" of Roman Catholic nuns who work within their neighborhoods.

==== 2023 Los Angeles Dodgers controversy ====
In 2023, the Los Angeles Sisters of Perpetual Indulgence were scheduled to receive a "Community Hero Award" from the Los Angeles Dodgers for their charity and activism on the Dodgers' annual Pride Night. On May 18, after US senator Marco Rubio, Catholic Vote, the Catholic League, and other religious groups criticized the honoring, the team initially rescinded the invitation. The Los Angeles LGBT Center, ACLU, LA county supervisor Lindsey Horvath, city councilmember Eunisses Hernandez, state senator Scott Wiener, and US representative Robert Garcia called to reverse the disinvitation or cancel Pride Night if it would not feature the Sisters. L.A. Pride, the partner organization helping the Dodgers host the event, pulled out in protest, and the Los Angeles LGBTQ Center called for a boycott. On May 20, Ashleigh Aitken, the mayor of Anaheim, invited the Sisters to participate in the Los Angeles Angels' Pride Night instead, which they did on June 7.

On May 22, the Dodgers apologized and re-invited the Sisters, who accepted. In response, Catholic bishop Robert Barron called the Sisters an anti-Catholic hate group and called for a boycott of the Dodgers. Dodgers pitchers Clayton Kershaw and Blake Treinen criticized the inclusion of the Sisters, saying their parodies were offensive. On the afternoon of Dodger Pride Night on June 17, thousands of Catholics and supporters protested in the parking lot.

=== Halloween ===
Celebrated even when the Castro was predominantly an Irish Catholic family neighborhood, as the demographics transformed, Halloween in the Castro became a major city event, described by author David Skal as "gay high holy day", attracting thousands of outsiders. On October 31, 1989, two weeks after San Francisco was devastated by the 6.9 MW Loma Prieta earthquake, the Sisters used donation buckets to collect thousands of dollars for the mayor's Earthquake Relief Fund from the Halloween crowds that poured into the Castro neighborhood for the massive street party.

A photo shoot for the San Francisco Sisters' 1995 HallowQueen event. Pictured - Sister Embellisha Helluvalotta, Sister Mystie Grey, Pope Dementia The Last, Sister Phatima La Dyke Van Dyk, Sister Penny Costal, Sister Zsa Zsa Glamour, Sister Mae B. Hostel and Sister Dana Van Iquity.

The next year, the Sisters, with the San Francisco Gay Men's Chorus and a group named Community United against Violence, took over the organization of the event for the next five years, drawing larger crowds and collecting for AIDS charities. By 1994 between 300,000 and 400,000 people attended the event. Controlling excesses became too difficult. Violence escalated, claimed by Dahn Van Laarz (Sister Dana van Iquity) to be the result of inebriated onlookers motivated by homophobia. When the police confiscated an AK-47 from a reveler trying to gain access to Castro Street, and they reported that 50 to 60 people had been arrested, the Sisters decided to move the celebration and Halloween in the Castro ended. The next year, the Sisters hosted a costume-mandatory dance named HallowQueen in a South of Market gay nightclub, which raised over $6,000 for charity.

A decade later the city was still struggling to manage the Halloween event. In 2006 nine people were wounded when a gunman opened fire at the celebration; it was canceled in 2007. The Sisters continued to organize private and safe events, raising money every year for charity.

=== Community involvement ===
The Sisters have been involved in various causes, including the promotion of safer sex, raising money for HIV/AIDS and breast cancer research, the Gay Games, Haight Ashbury Free Clinics, and raising the "first legal $1,000" for a city proposition to legalize medical cannabis. Sister Roma organized a "Stop the Violence" campaign in the Castro where the Sisters distributed placards in homes and businesses to signify which were safe places to go, and whistles to be used to alert those nearby in case of attack. They have sponsored dances for LGBT youth, and given to or worked for a variety of similar objectives.

According to Jessi Knippel, the Sisters also engage in "missionary" and care work for the LGBT community, participating in "bar missions" in which the members of the organisation share care bags and pamphlets. The self-declared goal of the Sisters is to assist the LGBT community and offer it "absolution from guilt".

== "Saints" and "angels" ==
Over the years the Sisters have named as saints hundreds of people who have helped on various projects behind the scenes organizing, coordinating actions or projects, performing at events as an artist or emcee or even serving the greater LGBT community. Rarely but sometimes they canonize community heroes who have recently died. It is customary for the Sisters to award sainthood with the addition of an elaborate "saint name". Notable saints include:

- Assassinated San Francisco Supervisor Harvey Milk
- California State Senator Carole Migden
- Gavin Newsom, mayor of San Francisco (later lieutenant governor and then governor of California)
- Jason West, mayor of New Paltz, New York
- San Francisco Supervisor Tom Ammiano
- Harry Hay, founder of the radical faeries
- Authors Armistead Maupin and Tonne Serah
- Actresses Margaret Cho, Kathy Griffin, Ethel Merman, and Rosie O'Donnell
- Dr. Elizabeth Stuart, professor of Christian Theology at King Alfred's College, Winchester
- Medical cannabis activist Brownie Mary
- Filmmaker and artist Derek Jarman
- French photographer Jean-Baptiste Carhaix
- Mabel Teng, former City Assessor-Recorder of San Francisco
- Rob Halford, lead singer of Judas Priest
- Daniel Quasar, designer of the Progress Pride Flag
- Community activists and organizers:

- Michael Brandon
- Molly McKay and Davina Kotulski
- Tony Whitehead, the first Chair of the Terrence Higgins Trust, the largest AIDS charity in Europe
- Ian Campbell Dunn
- Troughman

- Community drag icons and activists:

- Juanita More
- Donna Sachet
- Heklina
- Peaches Christ

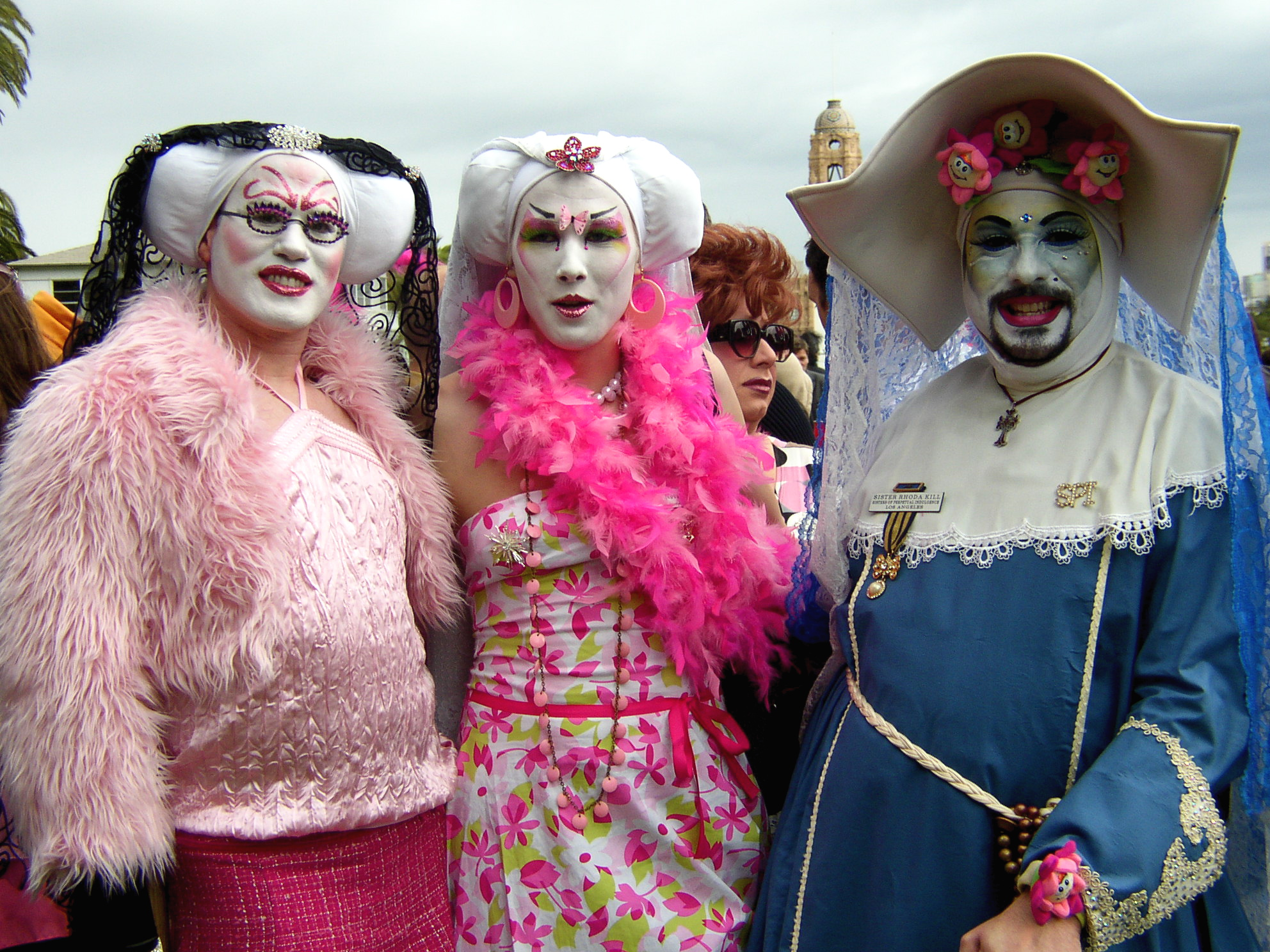
Sister Risque of the Sissytine Chapel (SF), Sister Viva L'Amour (SF), and Sister Rhoda Kill (LA) of the Sisters of Perpetual Indulgence San Francisco.

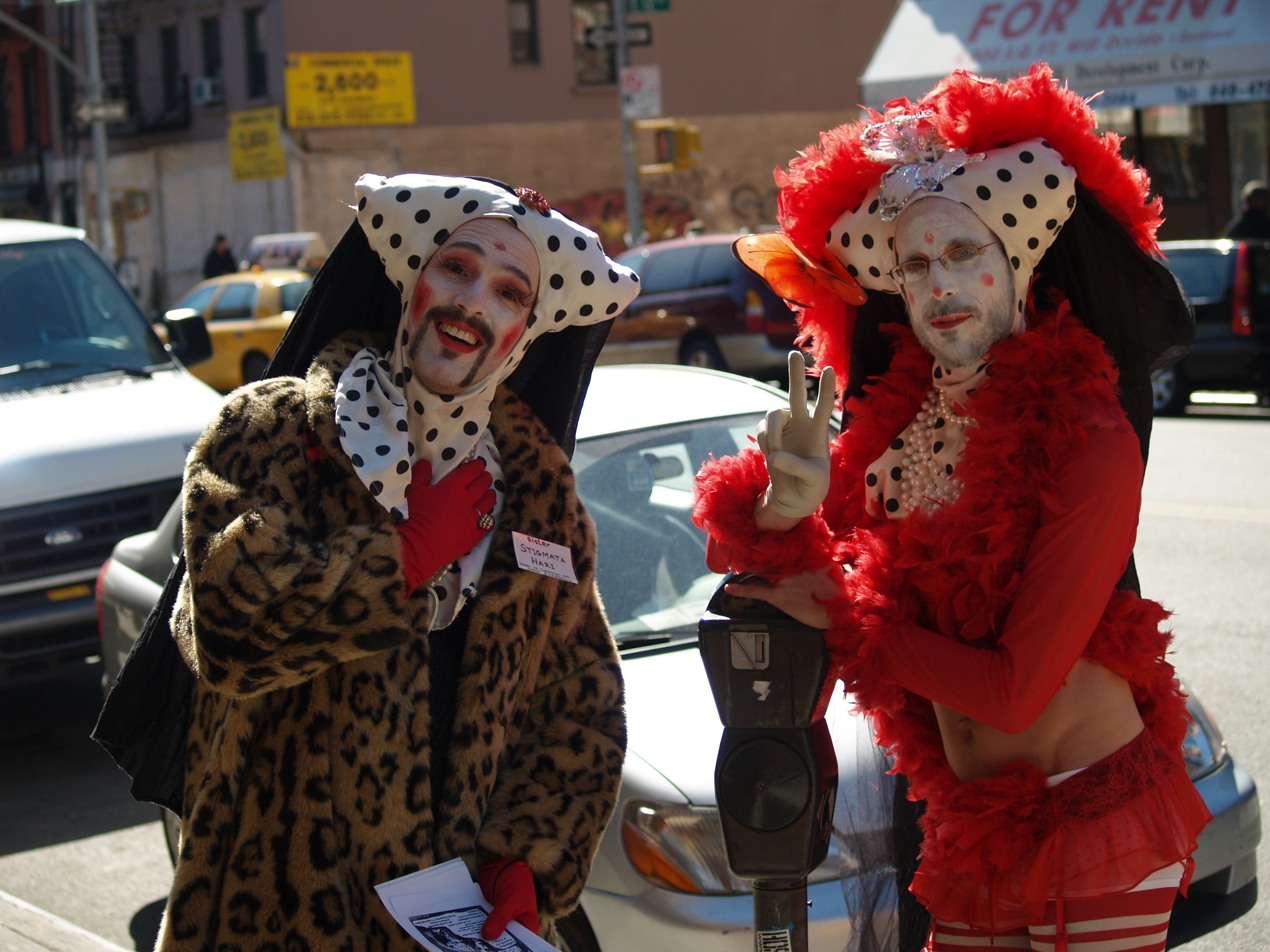
Sister Stigmata Hari (left) and Sister Lotti Da at a charity event sponsored by the New York City chapter.

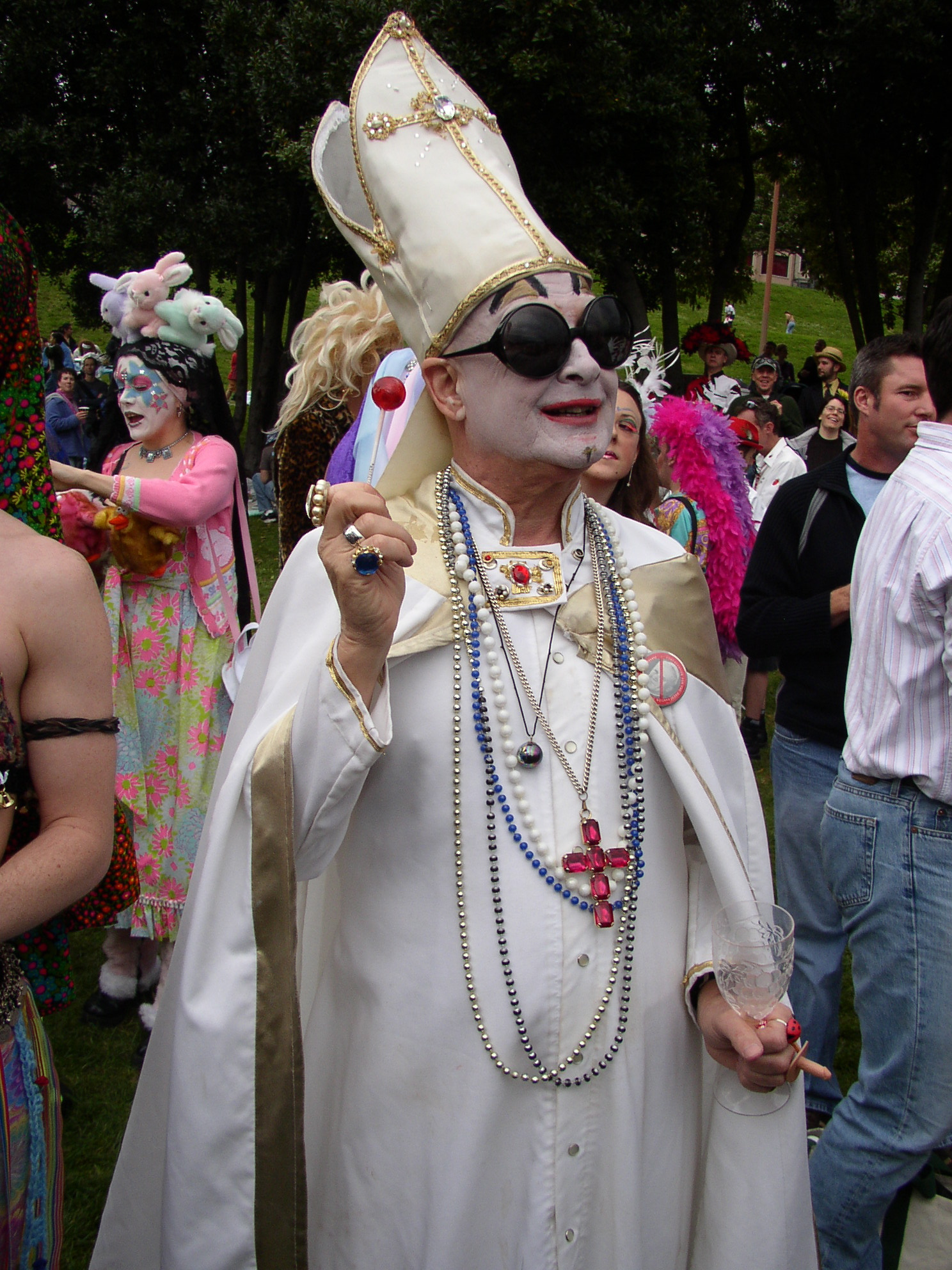
Pope Dementia The Last, a member of the Sisters of Perpetual Indulgence San Francisco

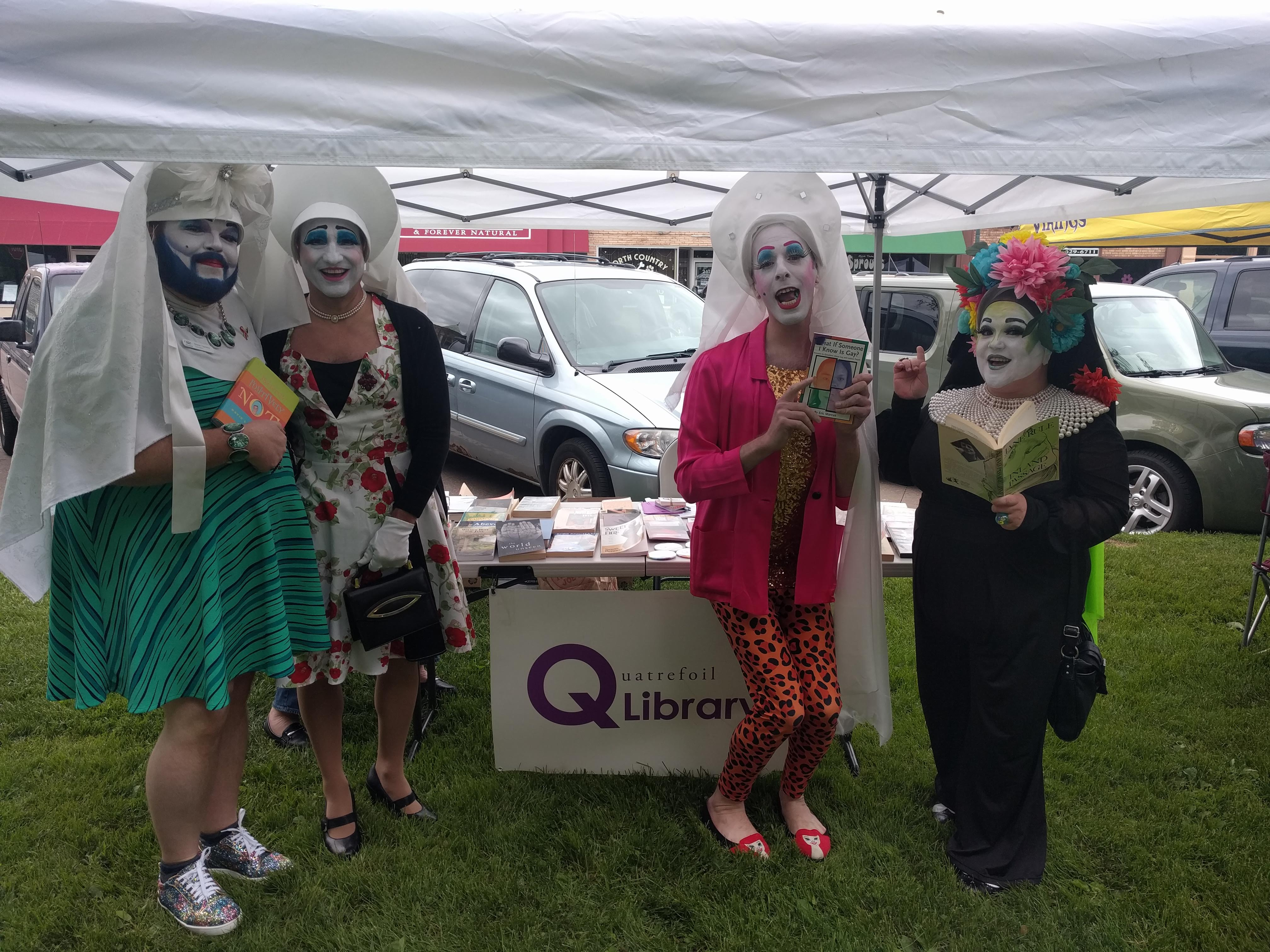
Sisters of Perpetual Indulgence at East-Central Minnesota Pride in Pine City, Minnesota.

== See also ==
- Counterculture
- Gay Shame
- Gender bender
- Hunky Jesus
- List of drag groups
- New York City Drag March
- Non-binary gender
- Parody religion
- Pink Saturday
- Radical Faeries
- Religious satire

== Bibliography ==
- de Jim, Strange (2003). San Francisco's Castro, Arcadia Publishing. ISBN 978-0-7385-2866-3
- Ellwood, Mark; Edwards, Nick (2009).The Rough Guide to San Francisco & the Bay Area (Rough Guide Travel Guides), Penguin. ISBN 1-4053-8437-9
- Evans, Annie; Healey, Trebor (2008). Queer and Catholic, Routledge. ISBN 1-56023-713-9
- Leyland, Winston, ed (2002). Out In the Castro: Desire, Promise, Activism, Leyland Publications. ISBN 978-0-943595-88-7
- Shilts, Randy (1987). And the Band Played On, St. Martin's Press. ISBN 0-312-00994-1
- Stryker, Susan; Van Buskirk, Jim (1996). Gay By the Bay: A History of Queer Culture in the San Francisco Bay Area, Chronicle Books. ISBN 0-8118-1187-5
- Turan, Kenneth (2005). Never Coming to a Theater Near You: A Celebration of a Certain Kind of Movie, PublicAffairs. ISBN 1-58648-349-8
- Wilcox, Melissa (2018). Queer Nuns: Religion, Activism, and Serious Parody, New York University Press. ISBN 1-4798-2036-9
