= Cliff's Variety Store =

Store in San Francisco, California, U.S.

- Company type: Retail variety and hardware store
- Industry: Retail; Variety store; Hardware store
- Founded: San Francisco, California, U.S. (1936)
- Founder: Hilario DeBaca
- Headquarters: San Francisco, California, U.S.
- Number of locations: 1
- Area served: San Francisco, California
- Number of employees: 35
- Website: cliffsvariety.com

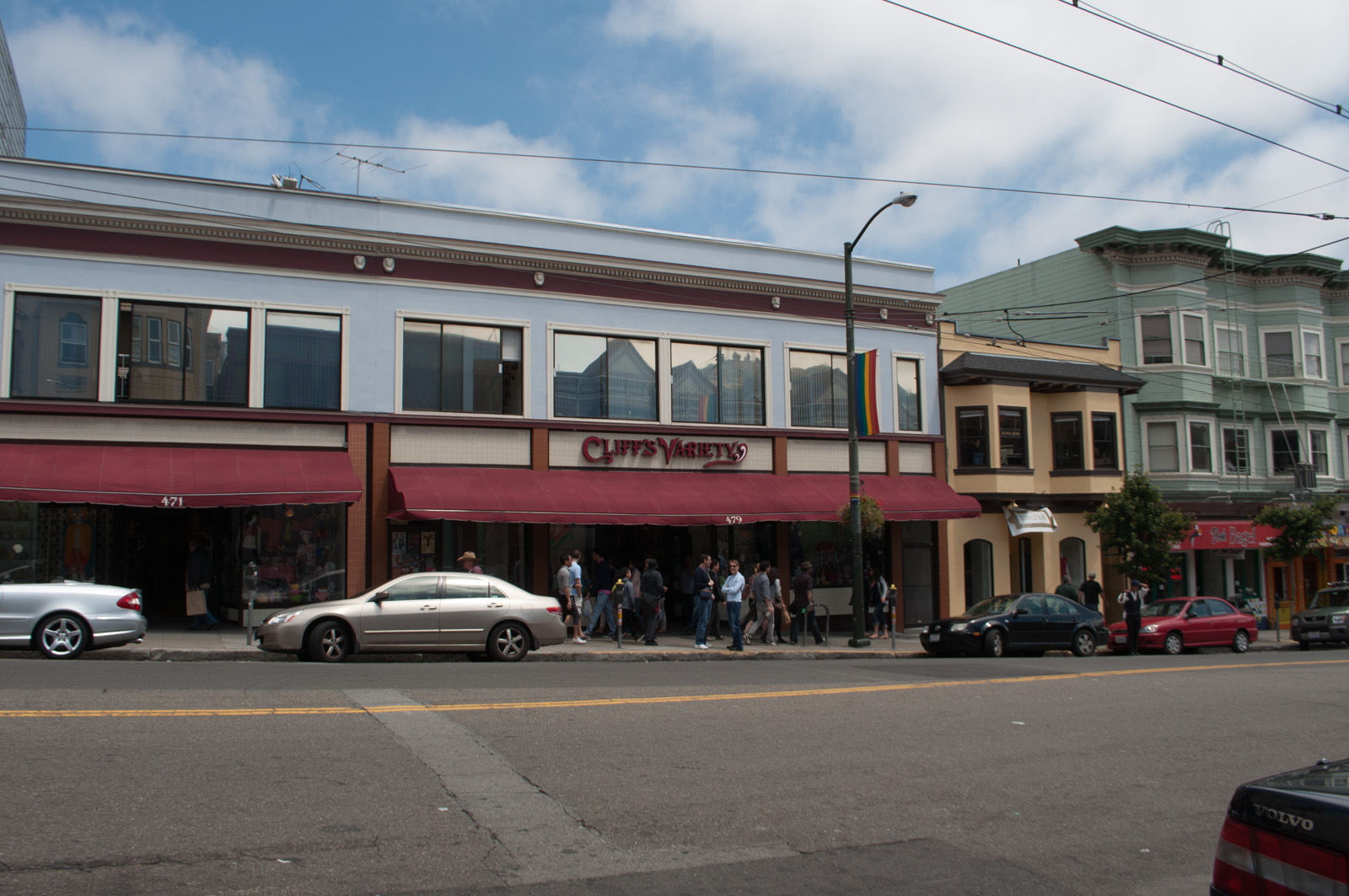
Cliff's is located at 479 Castro St (center). The awning on the left at 471 Castro St is Cliff's "Annex".

Cliff's Variety Store and Hardware is a hardware, home goods, variety, and fabric store located in the Castro neighborhood of San Francisco, California, since 1936. It has been in business for over 75 years and predates the neighborhood, becoming the first widely recognized gay mecca starting in the 1960s. It is one of the oldest family-run stores in the city.

It was previously referred to as "Cliff's Hardware Store".

== History ==
Hilario DeBaca, a former merchant and schoolteacher, wanted something to do during his retirement years, so opened the first Cliff's variety store—named after his youngest son Clifford—at 575 Castro a block south of its present-day location. It was "mostly a one-man operation". DeBaca's eldest son Ernie, was also a budding entrepreneur who started several businesses, and stores before traveling with his family and eventually moving back to San Francisco in the mid-1930s and re-opening his repair shop.

In 1942, Hilario moved the store 1/2 block, and closer to the main intersection of the neighborhood where Castro and 18th streets intersect. It was twice the size of his first store but still considered small. It was called Cliff's Trading Post. A few years later in 1946, Ernie had an accident which kept him off his feet for months; he closed his separate repair shop and set up a workbench in the back of Cliff's where he could repair small appliances. Also in 1946, Cliff's began hosting a children's Halloween festival that featured a costume contest and ice cream-eating contest. Between the two men they had during the time of the second store introduced mechanical displays that would save on the limited counter space while utilizing the unused ceiling for storage racks.

In the late 1950s, the second store was forced to close as the Hibernia Bank (now a Bank of America branch) was introducing drive-through banking. The third Cliff's opened up on the other side of 18th street at 495 Castro. By this time Hilario had died and Ernie's daughter, Lorraine Asten, had born a son and named him Ernie.

The neighborhood was quickly changing demographics and real estate values were rapidly rising. Since the advent of automobile and driving culture and post-WWII growth of suburbs, the declining Irish Catholic and Scandinavian populations were giving way to the much more liberal young people who were overflowing from the "Summer of Love" Haight-Ashbury neighborhood just over the hill. In the 1960s and 1970s, the Castro became a "center for gay liberation". Cliff's landlord explained that the rent would be tripling for the store at the end of 1971. At the same time, Bon Ami , a variety store a few doors away, was going bankrupt and Ernie DeBaca was able to buy the building outright.

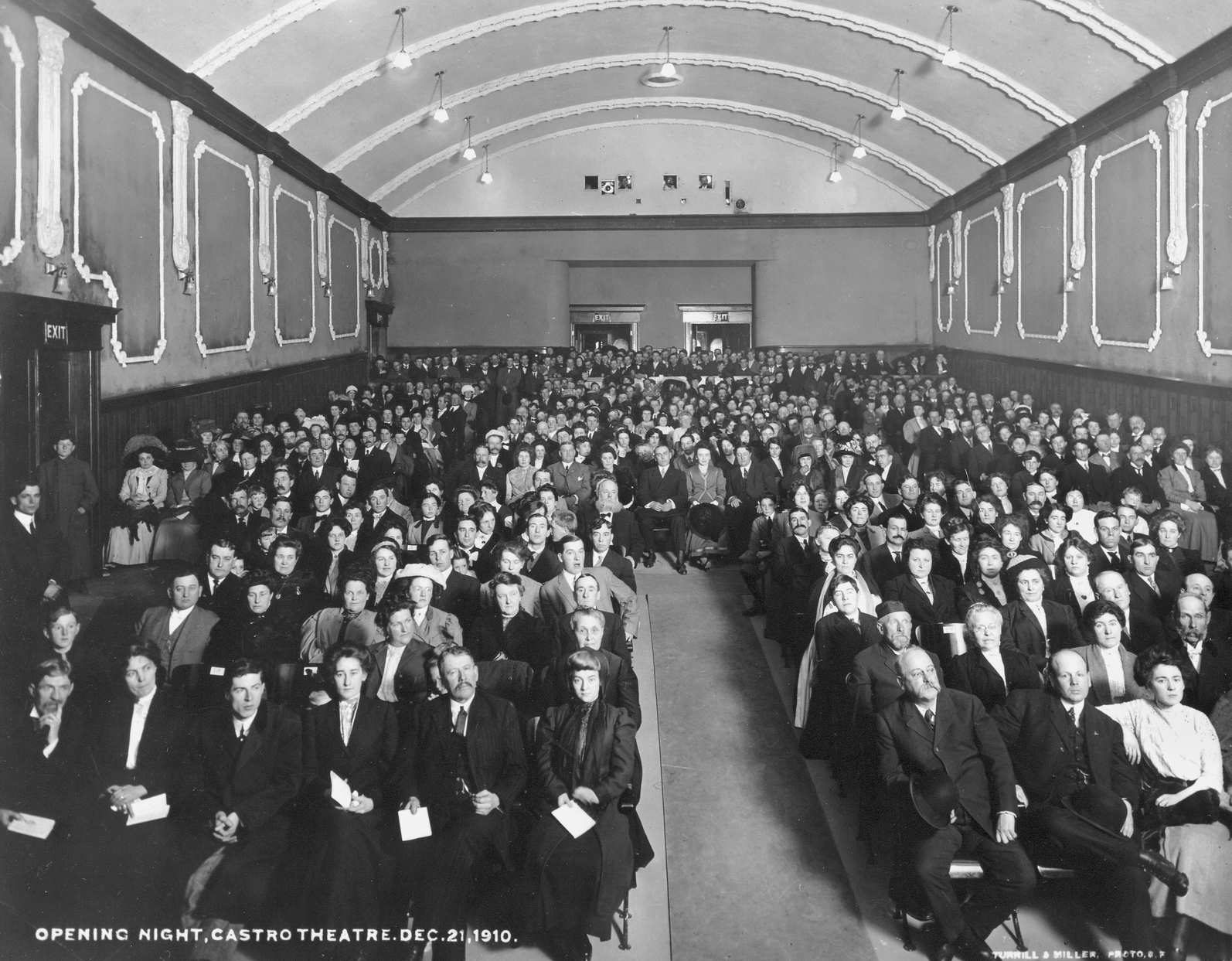
The original Castro Theatre was located at the present location of Cliff's at 479 Castro Street. The floor was sloped for the theater and had to be excavated for 2–3 years creating a storage basement for the incoming store.

The Castro Theatre originally opened at 479 Castro Street in 1910. The building was later remodeled into a retail store in the mid-1920s after the larger Castro Theater was built up the street. At the root of what was to become the best known gay mecca was the politicizing efforts of Harvey Milk, the first openly gay city supervisor in San Francisco, who started the Castro Street Fair and was later assassinated in SF City Hall in 1978. Milk had also started the Castro Village Association to provide an alternative to the "stodgy" Eureka Valley Merchants Association that was not as accepting of the new gay businesses. Milk together with Martha Asten put out information about the new emerging businesses of the Castro. The Castro had become very gay-friendly as gay bars replaced straight ones and Cliff's became the first Castro business to hire openly gay workers. Also in the 1970s, a basement had been excavated for storage.

Ernie of Cliff's Variety created children's Halloween costume contest in the Castro in 1948. By 1979, the Children's Halloween ended as the neighborhood's population shifted from families with children to more single men. But in the mid-90s, the Sisters of Perpetual Indulgence revived Children's Halloween with an annual party held at the Eureka Valley Recreation Center, including a costume contest and gifts from Cliff's.

In the late 1980s, the Hallmark cards business next door was closing up and the space at 471 Castro became available. Sometimes called Cliff's Annex, the new space would house "fabric, linens, bedding, and bath accessories".
