= Before Homosexuality in the Arab-Islamic World, 1500–1800 =

Book by Khaled El-Rouayheb

- Author: Khaled El-Rouayheb
- Publication date: November 1, 2005
- ISBN: 9-780-22672988-6

Before Homosexuality in the Arab-Islamic World, 1500–1800 is a 2005 book by Khaled El-Rouayheb, published by the University of Chicago Press. El-Rouayheb had written a PhD dissertation on the subject of homosexuality in the Arab-Islamic world, and this dissertation was supervised by Basim Musallam. El-Rouayheb revised the dissertation into this book. As of 2006 El-Rouayheb is a University of Cambridge postdoctoral fellow.

El-Rouayheb's thesis is that the male same sex desires expressed in the pre-modern Arab-Islamic world are not homosexuality in the modern, Western sense. Shusha Guppy of the Times Higher Education Supplement wrote that the book is "a more nuanced and limited study of "how homosexuality was perceived" in a particular period in the Arab parts of the Ottoman Empire before modernity", and therefore not a "Kinsey report" and not a general study. Donald L. Boisvert of Concordia University wrote that the work is one of the "few accessible studies of this sort". The author uses adab, biographical dictionaries, chronicles, travel journals written by Ottomans and Europeans, legal interpretations of the Quran and sharia, poetry, mystical treatises, and religious interpretations of the Quran and sharia as sources.

This book, a monograph, has been translated into French and Slovenian. The French version was published in 2010 and the Slovenian version was published in 2012.

== Contents ==
El-Rouayheb argues his thesis by stating that essentialist views of homosexuality in the Arab-Islamic world generally do not consider the contrast between the two roles in anal intercourse (liwāt): active and passive, the contrast between chaste desire (‘ishq) and sexual desire, and the contrast between anal intercourse and other kinds of sexual acts. El-Rouayeb weighs the definitions of homosexuality and argues in favor of Michel Foucault's position that "homosexuality" is a construct of the conditions of the time period and against the "essentialist" view that homosexuality has always been present. El-Rouayheb stated that the importation of European attitudes against homosexuality, which began in the 19th century, affected the view of homosexuality in the Arab-Islamic world.

There are a total of 37 pages of footnotes in both English and Arabic. The work includes English translations of Muslim jurists's legal opinions. El-Rouayheb included writings by Islamic intellectuals who focused on literature. Qur'anic commentators had documented interpretations that are present in this book. Writings by Islamic mystics and speculations written by theologians are also included.

Boisvert wrote that the book "does not suffer from the obscurantism and use of jargon that are so common in Ph.D. theses."

Yip concluded that "There is no doubt that El-Rouayheb has constructed a convincing case that the western-centric conception of homosexuality did not exist in the Arab-Islamic Middle East during the period under study." Boisvert argued that "Often he goes to what seem superhuman lengths to demonstrate that there’s absolutely nothing “homosexual” in any of this, nothing in all these men writing and singing about the wonders of beautiful young men, nothing in the many tales celebrating this bond of love." Abraham Ibrahim of Monash University argued that the work experiences difficulty in defining what is meant by "homosexuality", with a contributing factor being the requirement "to constantly handle contradictory evidence and analysis." Therefore, the work "the author repeatedly runs into problems, contradictions, and controversies of which he seems to be unfortunately unaware" and "we are left with his interpretation of the term — which seems to be a publicly-identified amalgam of various tropes that catch the author’s eye, primarily sodomy and effeminacy."

=== Chapters and supplementary content ===
The opening quote from Quentin Skinner argued that different societies had different concepts and that none of the concepts are general or timeless.

The content is divided into three chapters. Sabine Schmidtke of the Bulletin of the School of Oriental and African Studies wrote that each chapter is "dense" and "depicting a different strand relevant to perceptions of same-sex love among the culture of the male urban elite of the time."

The first chapter, "Pederasts and Pathics," stated that anal penetration has historically been viewed in terms of revenge, domination, hostility, and/or aggression from one party or another with the receptive partner losing masculinity by taking a "female" role, and therefore being dishonored or defeated, while the active partner did not receive these negative consequences. Therefore, there was a strong stigma against an adult male taking the passive role, and therefore going against his gender role. El-Rouayheb explained that pederasty, or a structure with an older male and a younger male, was the Ottoman standard of homosexual conduct. It was considered strange for one adult male to desire to have relations with another adult male. Most of this chapter can be read online at “Pederasts and Pathics.”

The second chapter, "Aesthetes," stated that same sex activity and a same sex-sexual desire were both considered highly inappropriate but that they are not the same as literary and artistic expression of a desire for youthful beauty, which is not perceived as a serious offense. The chapter includes analysis of love poetry. Miri Shefer-Mossensohn of Tel Aviv University wrote that the chapter "presents passionate love as a cultural value."

The third chapter, "Sodomites," discusses the four major schools of Islamic law and their punishments for same-sex activity. According to all four, the punishments were determined by the acts themselves rather than the motives; they proscribe less severe punishments for most forms of activity, such as kissing and fondling, while anal sex had the most severe punishment. Shefer-Mossensohn wrote that "most madhāhib regard only anal intercourse as cardinal in nature." In addition, according to several Islamic jurists, some activities, such as making love poetry towards fellow males, were allowed. Shefer-Mossensohn had also stated that "any first step along the slippery slope to such transgressions, even the mere gazing at beardless youths or being alone with them, was condemned." Boisvert argued that "None of these distinctions has anything to do with our great divide between homo- and heterosexual orientations."

The conclusion discusses the importation of European attitudes against homosexuality and the change of Arab-Islamic attitudes towards homosexuality.

The book includes two bibliographies, both of which are six pages long. One is of Arabic literature. The other is of secondary literature; most of this literature is in English.

== Reception ==
Walter Andrews of the University of Washington wrote that the book was "[m]eticulously researched, lucidly written, nuanced, and brilliantly conceived," and he concluded that "This is an important book by an excellent scholar."

Boisvert argued that the book tries too hard to dismiss the idea that men in the premodern Middle East were in love with one another; he wrote that "Despite this dogged commitment to queer theory, this is on balance a trenchant, insightful, and even brilliant book. But one cannot help wishing that it were not so dismissive of the passionate longings of the men it seeks so diligently to understand."

Thomas Eich, author of a book review for Die Welt des Islams, argued that the work, "a major contribution to the history of homosexuality in the Middle East," "is a big step forward in the analysis of Middle Eastern literature and has to be highly recommended to anyone working in the field of gender studies and Islam." Eich argued that it may be too simple to say that the influx of the Victorian attitudes were the sole reason why Middle Eastern attitudes on homosexuality changed and that "Therefore, it would seem much more reasonable to me to argue that before European expansion, more or less positive and negative attitudes toward homosexuality and homoeroticism existed side by side in the Middle East." Eich argued that the attitudes towards homosexuality in the Middle East changed due to both external and internal factors. In addition Eich believed that the work did not properly define "homosexuality as it is generally understood today" and that some of the sources on 20th Century homosexuality in the West were not properly used.

Vern L. Bullough of the State University of New York wrote that "I highly recommend the book for helping us to understand better the complexity of homosexuality."

Ibrahim argued that "The overall impression, then, is of a book that perhaps tells us less than it thinks it does." He added that despite the work's "minor" issues, he book has merit and that "It is only because the scholarship is generally so solid and the subject matter worthy of the serious attention El-Rouayheb gives it that I have been so critical of" the issues.

Steven Wozniak of the Archives of Sexual Behavior argued that the author's view that the premodern relationships were not homosexuality "appears to" be undermined by his "somewhat myopic view of male-male relationships" and also that the author did not discuss relationships with adult men and women as well as a lack of discussion of "ideas from the feminist and queer theory perspectives". Wozniak concluded that "The book is well written, rich in detail, elegantly produced, but ultimately only descriptive in nature."

Andrew K. T. Yip of Nottingham Trent University argued that the message, paraphrased by Yip as "No matter how tempting it is to universalize, we must exercise humility and caution; and take historical and cultural specificities seriously in our exploration of homosexuality, and indeed human sexuality", "is of great importance" "from a cross-cultural perspective particularly". Yip concluded that the book is "well-crafted and lucidly written", and that the author "is to be congratulated for having done a commendable job" despite the fact that some readers may perceive his argument to be "old hat".

== See also ==
- Homosexuality and Islam
- LGBT in the Middle East
- Islamic Homosexualities
