= Will Roscoe =

American activist, scholar, and author

- Born: February 8, 1955 (age 71); United States
- Occupations: Activist, scholar, author

Will Roscoe (February 8, 1955) is an American activist, scholar, and author based in San Francisco, California.

== Early life ==
Will Roscoe was born on February 8, 1955. He grew up in Missoula, Montana.

== Gay activism ==
Roscoe helped found the Lambda Alliance at the University of Montana, that state's first LGBT organization in 1975. He served as an intern at the National Gay and Lesbian Task Force in 1976, and the following year he formed the Oregon Gay Alliance, a statewide coalition of LGBT groups.

After relocating to San Francisco in 1978, he organized a successful campaign to obtain United Way membership for the Pacific Center for Human Growth in Berkeley, the first LGBT social service agency in the nation to receive that status. He subsequently worked with Harvey Milk in the "No on 6" campaign against the Briggs Initiative. After attending the first Radical Faerie gathering in Arizona in 1979, he became colleagues with Harry Hay, co-founding Nomenus, which operates an LGBT retreat center in southern Oregon. In 1995 he edited and published a selection of writings by Hay, who was also a foundational figure of the gay men's liberation movement. Roscoe also worked closely with the group Gay American Indians (GAI) on issues around the meaning of the term "berdache".

== Career as a writer ==
Roscoe was awarded the Margaret Mead Award for his first book, The Zuni Man-Woman; it also won the Lambda Literary Award for gay men's nonfiction.

In 2003, he received a Monette-Horwitz Achievement Award for research and scholarship combating homophobia.

His book Jesus and the Shamanic Tradition of Same-Sex Love received a Lambda Literary Award in 2005.

== Selected publications ==
Books

- Jesus and the Shamanic Tradition of Same-Sex Love. San Francisco: Suspect Thoughts Press, 2004.
- Changing Ones: Third and Fourth Genders in Native North America. Palgrave/St. Martin's Press, 1998.
- Queer Spirits: A Gay Men's Myth Book. Boston: Beacon Press, 1995.
- The Zuni Man-Woman. Albuquerque: University of New Mexico Press, 1991.

Edited volumes

- Boy Wives and Female Husbands: Studies of African Homosexualities, edited by Stephen O. Murray and Will Roscoe. St. Martin's Press, 1998.
- Islamic Homosexualities: Culture, History, and Literature, edited by Stephen O. Murray and Will Roscoe. New York: New York University Press, 1997.
- Radically Gay: Gay Liberation in the Words of Its Founder, by Harry Hay. Boston: Beacon: 1996.
- Living the Spirit: A Gay American Indian Anthology. New York: St. Martin's Press, 1988.
