= Castro Theatre =

Historic movie palace in San Francisco

Coordinates: 37°45′43″N 122°26′06″W

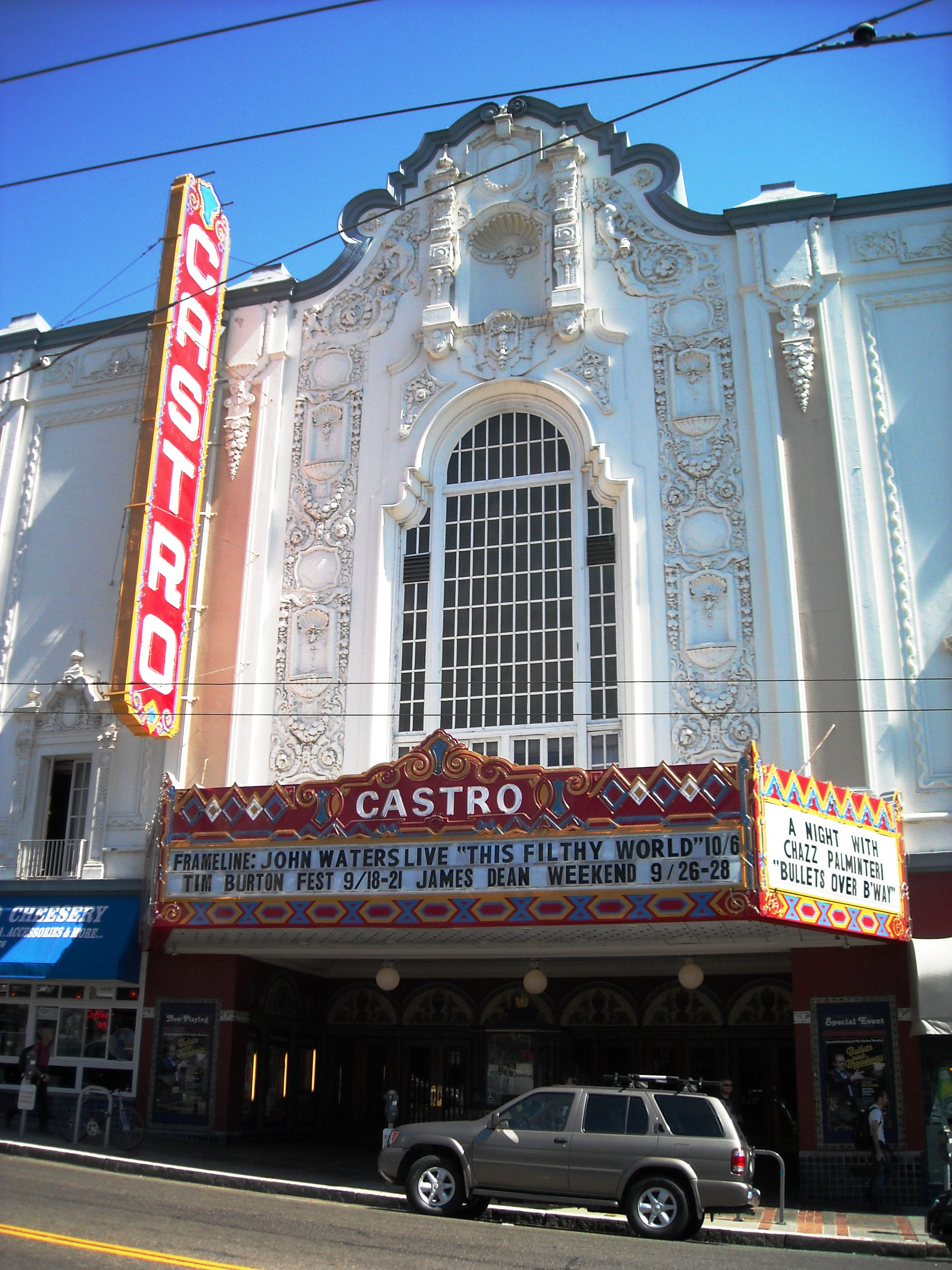
- Front entrance of the Castro Theatre (2008)

- Location within San Francisco County Location within California Location within the United States
- Location: 429 Castro Street; San Francisco, California, U.S.
- Owner: Nasser family
- Capacity: 1,400
- Type: Movie theater
- Public transit: Castro; 17th & Castro

Construction
- Opened: June 22, 1922; 104 years ago
- Architect: Timothy L. Pflueger

Website
- www.castrotheatre.com

San Francisco Designated Landmark
- Designated: 1977
- Reference no.: 100

The Castro Theatre is a historic movie palace in the Castro District of San Francisco, California. Built in 1922, the theater displays architectural styles including Beaux-Arts and Spanish Baroque. Its designer, Timothy L. Pflueger, also designed Oakland's Paramount Theater and other movie theaters in California during that period. The theater's landmark Art Deco marquee was added in 1937.

The theater has a capacity of 1,400 for concerts, or 1,150 for movies.

== History ==
The Castro Theatre originally opened at 479 Castro Street in 1910. It was subsequently remodeled into a retail store (occupied by Cliff's Variety Store since 1971) in the mid-1920s after the larger Castro Theatre was built at 429 Castro Street, its current location, only a few doors up from the original theatre.

The new Castro Theatre opened on June 22, 1922, for an invitation-only screening, with Mayor James "Sunny Jim" Rolph in attendance, of the Paramount Pictures release Across the Continent (1922), starring Wallace Reid. The new theatre opened the following day to the general public.

The venue became San Francisco Historic Landmark #100 in September 1976.

The Castro Theatre has hosted repertory movies, film festivals, and special events, often with an LGBT and multicultural focus. It has also been the site for gala tributes to Hollywood stars including Tony Curtis, Ann-Margret, Debbie Reynolds, Mitzi Gaynor, Ann Miller, Kim Novak, Jane Russell, and Sandra Dee. In January 2008, for the filming of the Gus Van Sant biopic Milk, restorations were made to the neon on the theater's marquee and blade sign, and the facade was repainted. The movie about the life and times of Harvey Milk, the San Francisco city Supervisor who was California's first openly gay elected official (portrayed by actor Sean Penn, who won an Academy Award for his performance), had its world premiere at the theater in November 2008.

=== Management change and historic restoration ===
In January 2022, during an extended closure due to the COVID-19 pandemic, Berkeley-based concert promoter Another Planet Entertainment announced that it had leased the Castro Theatre from Bay Properties, the theater's owner, to reopen in January 2023, refocusing on presenting live music, in addition to film, comedy, and other events. APE also announced plans to update the theater by implementing significant improvements to the sound, lighting, production, HVAC, and the theater's trademark marquee.

APE's management of the space raised questions about the hosting of movies at the theater, as the local film community was anxious that the change could mean the end of the theater's legacy as a repertory movie house. Complaints also arose over the future of the organ located there.

APE's plans included changing the main floor of the auditorium by removing existing seating to install flat terraces for standing-room music shows with optional temporary chairs. A "Save the Seats" campaign argued that the movie-palace seating was integral to the historic integrity of the Castro Theatre and that the venue could be run successfully without destroying the existing configuration. APE offered various modifications to the plan after its initial proposal, but none involved preserving the classic movie-palace seating on the main floor. Seating in the balcony was preserved.

After being closed for two years for the $41 million renovation, the Castro Theatre reopened on February 6, 2026, with a ribbon-cutting ceremony and a benefit screening of the movie The Adventures of Priscilla, Queen of the Desert.

== Theater organ ==
A Wurlitzer organ that became a landmark of the theater was added in the 1980s, but was removed in 2015 after its owner decided to move to Sacramento, taking a quarter of the pipework with him. A 3-manual Allen was used as a temporary instrument while a major new installation was being undertaken.

The new instrument is considered the largest hybrid organ ever built, with 7 manuals and over 400 registers available. The organ has just 1,200 physical pipes, borrowed from a Wurlitzer/Kimball instrument, as the 16 ranks that were meant to be installed proved too complex and expensive to restore. The new organ arrived just before the theater's 2026 reopening.

== Gallery ==
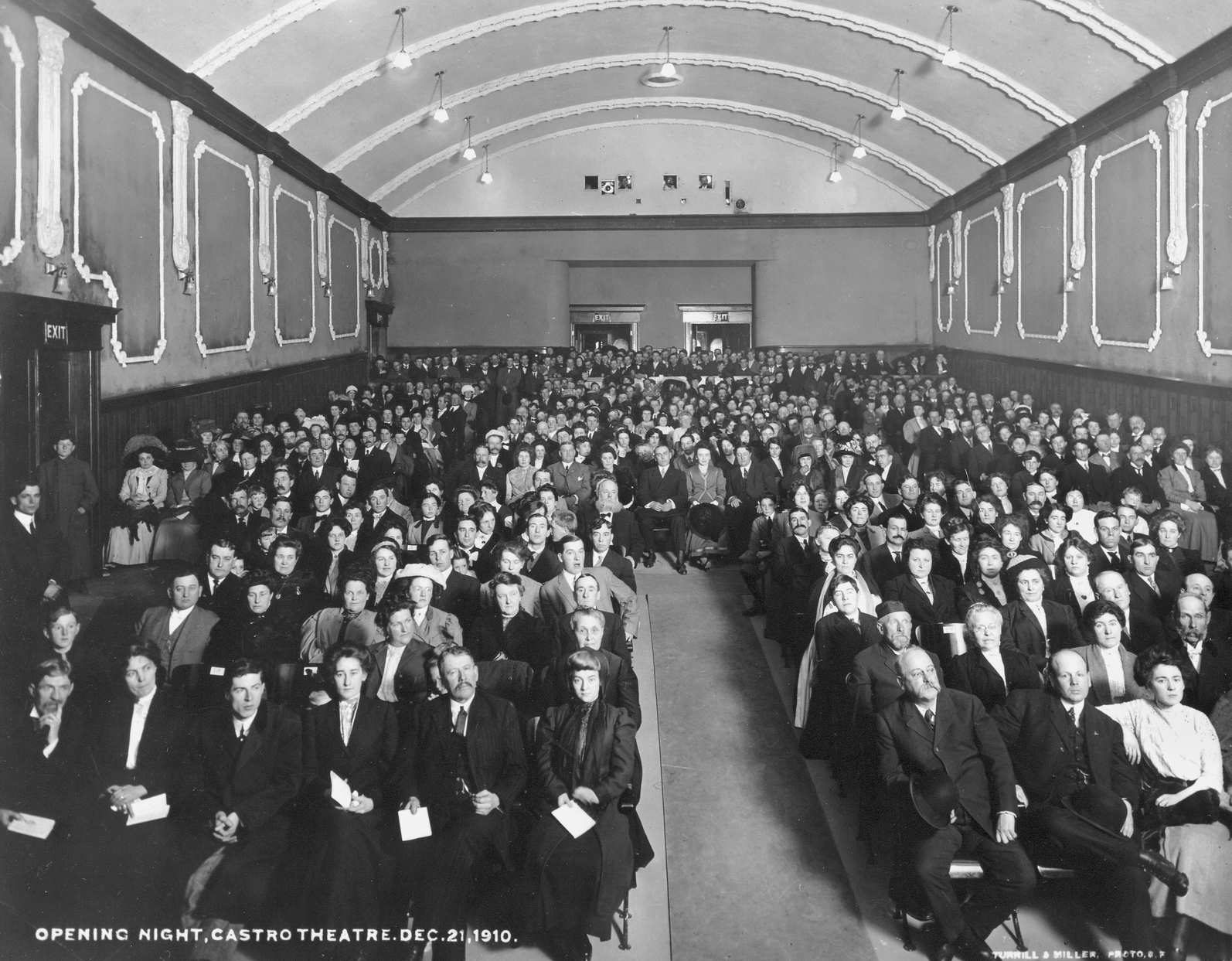
The original Castro Theatre located at 479 Castro Street

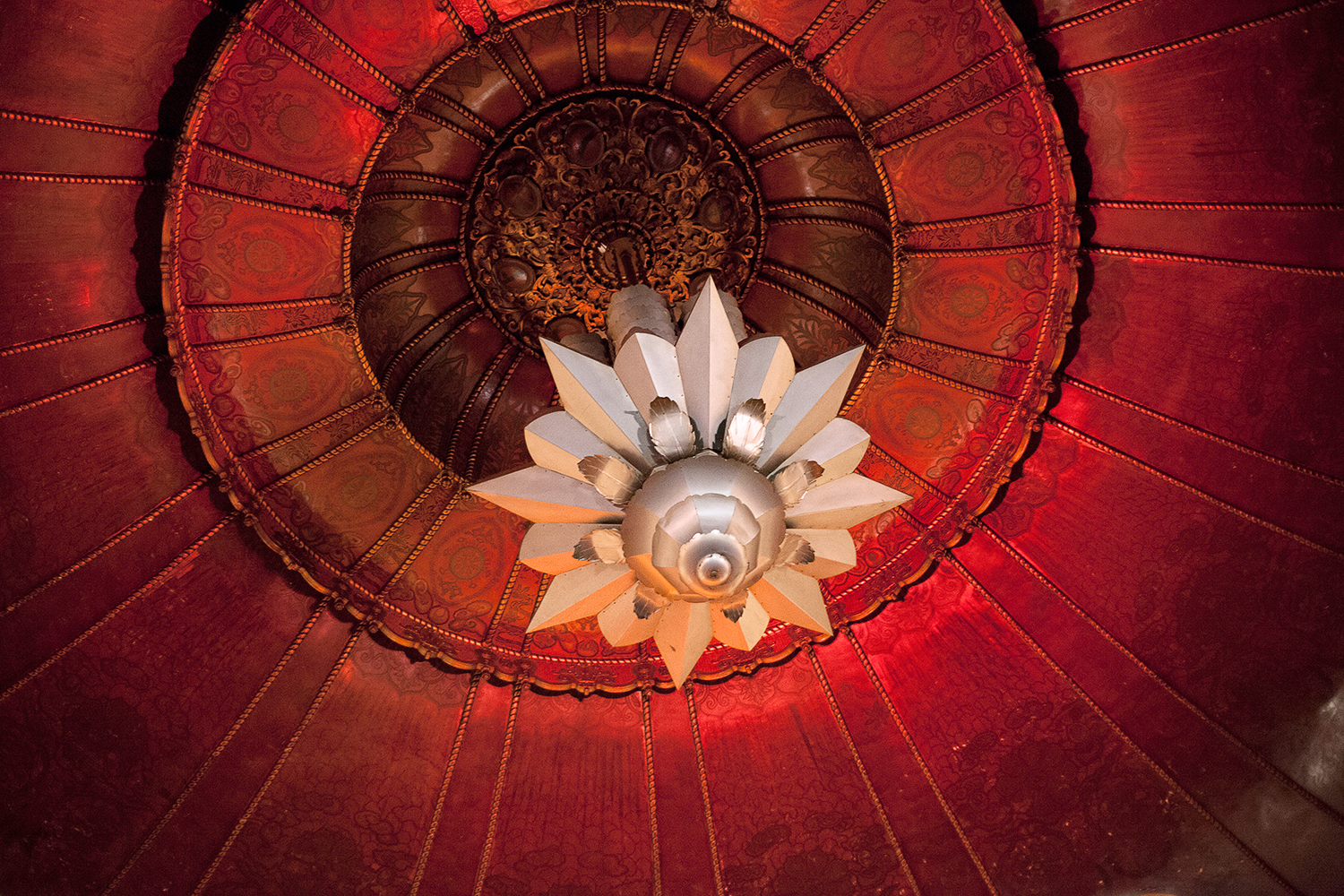
The extravagant interior ceiling with Art Deco chandelier made by Phoenix Day Lighting, as it appears in the darkened movie hall

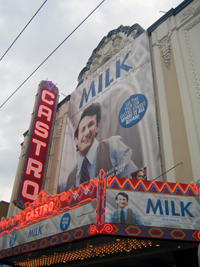
Castro Theatre running Milk November 2008

== See also ==
- Roxie Theater
- Victoria Theater
