= Boy Wives and Female-Husbands: Studies in African Homosexualities =

1998 non-fiction book

- Editor: Stephen O. Murray; Will Roscoe
- Language: English
- Genre: same-sex love, non-binary gender and queer studies
- Publisher: Palgrave Macmillan; St. Martin's Press
- Publication date: 1998
- Publication place: London, UK
- Media type: Print, e-book
- Pages: 374
- ISBN: 9781438484099

Boy-Wives and Female Husbands: Studies in African Homosexualities is a 1998 non-fiction book that explores African anthropology, history, and gender, examining homosexuality in both traditional and contemporary African societies. It was edited by American independent scholars Stephen O. Murray and Will Roscoe and foreword by Marc Epprecht. It was republished in 2021 by State University of New York Press under SUNY Press Open Access.

== Plot ==
The book seeks to dispel the myth that homosexuality and gender diversity are absent from African cultures, countering denials by some historians, anthropologists, and contemporary Africans. It documents evidence of sexual and gender diversity in fifty societies across different regions of sub-Saharan Africa, challenging the belief that homosexuality was introduced to the continent by Europeans or Arabs.

It is a collection of essays on anthropology and history, supported by extensive ethnographic and literary research. The book presents evidence of same-sex relationships in African societies.

== Table of content ==
- Part I. Horn of Africa, Sudan, and East Africa
- Part II. West Africa
- Part III. Central Africa
- Part IV. Southern Africa
- Part V. Conclusions

== Reception ==
Peter Nardi, writing for the American Journal of Sociology, described the book's strongest point as its nuanced discussion of arranged marriages and love marriages, which do not fit the paradigm of progressive modernization. Norbert Brockman also reviewed the book in the Journal of Sex Education and Therapy.

Channing Gerard Joseph of the University of Southern California described the book as the first serious study of same-sex sexuality and gender diversity in Africa.
