= Sister Boom Boom =

American drag nun and astrologer (1955–2012)

- Born: Jack Fertig; February 21, 1955; Chicago, Illinois, United States
- Died: August 5, 2012 (aged 57); San Francisco, California, United States
- Other names: Sister Mary Boom Boom; Sister Rose of the Bloody Stains of the Sacred Robes of Jesus
- Occupations: Drag nun; activist; astrologer
- Organization: Sisters of Perpetual Indulgence

Sister Boom Boom, also known as Sister Mary Boom Boom, was the drag nun persona of astrologer Jack Fertig (February 21, 1955 – August 5, 2012). He was a prominent member of the Sisters of Perpetual Indulgence, a gay activist group founded in San Francisco in 1979.

== Drag career ==
Often erroneously credited as a founder of the group, Sister Boom Boom actually joined the Sisters of Perpetual Indulgence in 1980, several months after its founding. His persona's full name was Sister Rose of the Bloody Stains of the Sacred Robes of Jesus, which—when spoken—would trail into a sing-song cadence and a long fermata.

In 1982, Sister Boom Boom ran for a seat on the San Francisco Board of Supervisors with agitprop campaigning tactics bringing humor and raising issues he felt were being ignored in the race. He won 23,124 votes with his occupation listed as "Nun of the Above". Five supervisors were elected; he placed eighth. After he started campaigning for mayor in the 1983 recall election against incumbent Dianne Feinstein, San Francisco passed an ordinance requiring candidates to use only their legal names on the ballot. This was commonly called the "Sister Boom Boom law".

Boom Boom wrote a theatrical-ritual exorcism of Jerry Falwell and Phyllis Schlafly. The exorcism was performed by the Sisters in Union Square on July 13, the Friday before the 1984 Democratic National Convention, before a crowd of about 2,000.

Boom Boom is one of the characters in Emily Mann's play Execution of Justice about the trial of Dan White for the 1978 assassinations of George Moscone and Harvey Milk. Moscone was mayor of San Francisco and Milk was the city's first openly gay supervisor. In the Broadway production, Boom Boom was played by Wesley Snipes.

Fertig retired Sister Boom Boom in 1985, and joined a sobriety program. He left the Sisters of Perpetual Indulgence in the spring of 1986, though he would continue activism beyond drag.

== Personal life ==
Fertig was born in Chicago on February 21, 1955. Born to a Jewish father and a Christian mother, he associated with many religions throughout his life. He had variously identified as Roman Catholic and Episcopalian, before converting to Islam in 2001. Fertig never identified as a woman.

Fertig worked as an astrologer. He died on August 5, 2012, in San Francisco, from liver cancer.
