= Stephen O. Murray =

American anthropologist and sociologist (1950-2019)

Stephen Omer Murray
- Born: May 4, 1950; St. Paul, Minnesota, U.S.
- Died: August 27, 2019 (aged 69); San Francisco, California, U.S.
- Spouse(s): Keelung Hong, Ph.D. (together since 1981)

Academic background
- Education: Michigan State University; University of Arizona; University of Toronto; University of California, Berkeley
- Thesis: "Social Science Networks" (1979)

Academic work
- Discipline: Anthropology, Sociology

Stephen O. Murray (May 4, 1950 – August 27, 2019) was an American anthropologist, sociologist, and independent scholar based in San Francisco, California. He was known for extensive scholarly work on the sociology, anthropology, and comparative history of sexual and gender minorities, on sociolinguistics, history of the social sciences, and as an important editor and organizer of scholarly work in these areas.

== Early life and education ==
Stephen Murray grew up in rural Minnesota. A member of the second class at James Madison College within Michigan State University, Stephen Murray had an undergraduate double major in social psychology and in Justice, Morality, and Constitutional Democracy. He earned his M.A. degree from the University of Arizona in sociology in 1975, and a Ph.D. from the University of Toronto, also in sociology in 1979, and then undertook post-doctoral training in anthropology at the University of California, Berkeley (1980–1982).

== Career ==
His work included studies in sociolinguistics, history of social sciences (anthropology, sociology, linguistics), and extensive publications on the historical and cross-cultural social organizations of homosexuality. His main areas of fieldwork were in North America United States Mexico, Canada, and Taiwan (with his partner Keelung Hong). He also co-edited books on homosexualities in sub-Saharan Africa and across the Islamic world with Will Roscoe.

With Regna Darnell, he co-edited the monographic series "Critical Studies in the History of Anthropology" for the University of Nebraska Press. He worked for more than a decade in public health with California county health departments and also wrote on public health issues, particularly in regard to HIV/AIDS.

He held positions on the editorial boards of several social science journals including the Journal of Homosexuality and the Histories of Anthropology Annual. From 2003 to 2005, he contributed articles to glbtq: An encyclopedia of gay, lesbian, bisexual, transgender, and queer culture. He also contributed to other reference volumes. He was a regular contributor at epinions.com and associatedcontent.com.

Stephen Murray died in San Francisco, California, on August 27, 2019, of complications of a B-cell lymphoma.

== Selected publications ==
- Murray, Stephen O (1995), Latin American Male Homosexualities, University of New Mexico Press, ISBN 978-0-8263-1658-5
- Murray, Stephen O (1996), American gay, University of Chicago Press, ISBN 978-0-226-55193-7
- Murray, Stephen O (1996), Angkor Life, Bua Luang Books, ISBN 978-0-942777154
- Murray, Stephen O; Roscoe, Will (1997), Islamic Homosexualities: Culture, history, and literature, New York University Press, ISBN 978-0-8147-7468-7
- Murray, Stephen O; Roscoe, Will (1998), Boy-wives and Female Husbands: Studies in African homosexualities, St. Martin's Press, ISBN 978-0-312-23829-2
- Murray, Stephen O (1998), American Sociolinguistics: Theorists and theory groups, Amsterdam, ISBN 978-1-55619-532-7 (Rev. ed. of Theory groups and the study of language in North America: a social history (1994).
- Murray, Stephen O (2000), Homosexualities, University of Chicago Press, ISBN 978-0-226-55194-4
- Murray, Stephen O (2002), Pacific Homosexualities, Writers Club Press / iUniverse, ISBN 0-595-22785-6
- Hong, Keelung; Murray, Stephen O (2005), Looking through Taiwan: American anthropologists' collusion with ethnic domination, University of Nebraska press, ISBN 978-0-8032-2435-3
- Murray, Stephen O (2012), Pieces for a History of Gay Studies, Obregón, ASIN B007Q3E6EK
- Murray, Stephen O (2012), Reading Sicily (in English), Obregón, ASIN B0083LLH1O
- Murray, Stephen O (2012), Collected Stories, Obregón., ASIN B008HLQT3G
- Murray, Stephen O (2012), Reading 20th-Century Italian Fiction, Obregón, ASIN B00ABN6UUA
- Murray, Stephen O (2012), 21st-Century Representation of Muslim Homosexualities, Obregón, ASIN B008HKFYG0
- Murray, Stephen O (2013), An Introduction to African Cinema, Obregón, ASIN B00AZMXAE6
- Murray, Stephen O (2013), American Anthropology and Company: Historical Explorations, University of Nebraska Press., ISBN 978-0803243958
