= Islamic Homosexualities =

1997 collection of essays

- Author: Stephen O. Murray and Will Roscoe
- Genre: Sociology
- Publisher: NYU Press
- Publication date: February 1997
- ISBN: 9780814774687

Islamic Homosexualities: Culture, History, and Literature is a collection of essays edited by Stephen O. Murray and Will Roscoe and published in 1997 by New York University Press.

The editors argued that students of the Middle East who originated from all countries have avoided giving attention to homosexual acts, so therefore they had the book made to give attention to the practices. The book's stated purposes were to state "the conceptions and organizations of homosexual desire and conduct in Islamic societies" and "to counter the pronounced Eurocentrism of recent research on homosexuality". The book's central argument is "treating the patterns of homosexuality we find in Islamic societies as categorically distinct from all aspects of modern homosexual identity and lifestyles reinforces the conceits of Eurocentrism". Both editors were not Middle Eastern specialists but were North American and Latin American specialists. Bruce Dunne of the Lambda Book Report wrote that the book argued that premodern LGBT groups in the Middle East are "progressive" and "modern" as much as the modern LGBT identities are.

Didi Khayatt of York University stated her belief that "the authors' need to find Islamic homosexualities either similar to or different from Western notions of corresponding sexual practices is in line with the very critique they want to avoid." Steven C. Caton of the New School for Social Research argued that "Eurocentrism" was not properly used, since the word should refer to a view that Europe is central to the world, and that it may be Eurocentric to look for LGBT sexualities of the European style in the Islamic world.

Dunne stated that this book was aimed at both academic and general audiences.

== Contents ==
The editors co-wrote the introduction and conclusion. The book contains over 22 essays, which all discuss same sex desire in the Islamic world. Time periods discussed in the essays range from pre-Islamic period to present. The cultures in the works include Arab, Iranian, and Turkish cultures; and the countries include areas of South Asia; areas of Southeast Asia, including Indonesia; Egypt; Iran; Iraq; Spain under Islamic rule, Oman, and Turkey, including Ottoman Turkey. Murray wrote and/or co-wrote thirteen of the essays. Roscoe wrote one of the essays. In addition to Murray and Roscoe there are other contributors. The contributors include academics with different subject fields, journalists, a businessperson, and a publisher. Some of the contributors originate from Islamic countries, and the authors included three Pakistanis. Most essays are original to the book while some are revised or non-revised versions of essays previously printed in other publications. The essays other than those by the Pakistanis are based on cultural information from literary studies, research in archives and documentaries, and research reports written by other people; these essays do not include fieldwork.

Dunne argued that the essays "are wide-ranging, prodigiously informative and bibliographically rich." Khayatt argued that the "stronger" essays contextualized same-sex practices in the Islamic world. Khayatt believes the book has "clearly established" the fact that sexual activities and practices involving people of the same gender "ideologically different from Western notions of "homosexual identity"" exist, but that the authors did not "demonstrate how Islamic societies conceptualize a "homosexual identity."" Michael R. Stevenson of Ball State University wrote that the depth, length, and quality of the chapters varies and "Some read like fragments of what should have been a larger, more integrated work."

=== Parts ===
The book has four parts.

"Part I: Introduction to Islamic Homosexualities." has background information and an introduction. The introduction, Chapter 1, was written by Roscoe and Murray. Murray wrote "The Will Not to Know: Islamic Accommodations of Male Homosexualities," Chapter 2. Roscoe wrote "Precursors of Islamic Male Homosexualities," Chapter 3. Jim Wafer wrote "Muhammad and Male Homosexuality," Chapter 4. Murray wrote "Woman-Woman Love in Islamic Societies," Chapter 5.

"Part II: Literary Studies" covers Islamic law and mystical literature in addition to tropes from Medieval-era Turkey and Iran. Wafer wrote Chapter 6: "Vision and Passion: The Symbolism of Male Love in Islamic Mystical Literature." Murray wrote Chapter 7: "Corporealizing Medieval Persian and Turkish Tropes." Louis Crompton wrote Chapter 8: "Male Love and Islamic Law in Arab Spain."

Historical analyses of Islamic cultures in the 19th century, on Turkey during the Ottoman Empire, Egypt in the Medieval era Mamluk Empire, and Albania are in "Part III: Historical Studies". Murray wrote Chapters 9 through 11 and 13-14: "Male Homosexuality, Inheritance Rules, and the Status of Women in Medieval Egypt: The Case of the Mamlūks", "Homosexuality among Slave Elites in Ottoman Turkey", "Male Homosexuality in Ottoman Albania", "Some Nineteenth-Century Reports of Islamic Homosexualities", and "Gender-Defined Homosexual Roles in Sub-Saharan African Islamic Cultures", respectively. Chapter 12, "The Balkan Sworn Virgin: A Cross-Gendered Female Role," was written by Mildred Dickemann.

Part IV consists of seven anthropological studies discussing the perception of same sex activity by those who conduct same sex activity. Two essays written by Pakistanis discuss LGBT life in modern Pakistan. The final chapter is the conclusion of the book. The Chapters in Part IV are: Chapter 15: "Institutionalized Gender-Crossing in Southern Iraq" by Sigrid Westphal-Hellbusch with Bradley Rose as a translator, Chapter 16: "The Sohari Khanith by Murray, Chapter 17: "Male Actresses in Islamic Parts of Indonesia and the Southern Philippines" by Murray, Chapter 18: "Two Baluchi Buggas, a Sindhi Zenana, and the Status of Hijras in Contemporary Pakistan," by Nauman Naqvi and Hasan Mutjaba, "The Chapter 19: "The Other Side of Midnight: Pakistani Male Prostitutes" by Mutjaba, Chapter 20: "Not-So-Gay Life in Pakistan in the 1980s and 1990s" by Badruddin Khan, Chapter 21: "Two Islamic AIDS Education Organizations" by Murray and Eric Allyn, and Chapter 22: Conclusion, by Murray and Roscoe.

== Reception ==
Khaled El-Rouayheb, who wrote Before Homosexuality in the Arab‐Islamic World, 1500–1800, believed that Islamic Homosexualities's depiction of same-sex behavior in the Arab and Islamic world was "homosexual" when such behavior was not homosexual, and El-Rouayheb argued that the depiction of the same-sex behavior in Islamic Homosexualities was Westernized, inaccurate, and romanticized.

Khayatt concluded that "Overall[...]the book is excellent in its breadth, and I, for one, am thankful for the work of these authors." She suggested that the analysis of lesbian practices should have indicated a possible difference in how Islamic cultures perceive of same-sex female practices instead of stating that the concepts are censored and hidden from society, and that the practice of "(heterosexual couples) changing the gender of the loved one in the heat of passion" in media should have been explored. She argued that "the authors in the book rely on Western texts to support their analysis rather than looking to the cultural contexts for speculations."

Edward Stein, JD, PhD, an associate professor of the Cardozo School of Law, argued that there should have been more theoretical discussion present. He argued that "Even without such theoretical discussion, anyone interested in the study of human sexual desire will find something of use in Islamic Homosexualities."

Dunne argued that the book's weaknesses were an over-reliance on travel accounts from Westerners and translated texts and some factual errors; he also argued that "few, if any" authors "appear" to have formal expertise with the Middle East, even though several had a strong interest in the Middle East. Dunne concluded that overall the book was "welcome" and "ambitious".
