= Castro Street Fair =

LGBTQ festival in San Francisco

- 2008 Castro Street Fair artwork noting the 35th anniversary of the event founded by gay activist and politician Harvey Milk portraying him in iconic Superman style.
- Genre: Local, LGBT, Arts, Entertainment
- Frequency: First Sunday of October
- Location: The Castro, San Francisco
- Years active: 52
- Inaugurated: 1974
- Attendance: 300,000 (2007)
- Website: CastroStreetFair.org

The Castro Street Fair is a San Francisco LGBT street festival and fair usually held on the first Sunday in October in the Castro neighborhood, the main gay neighborhood and social center in the city. The fair features multiples stages with live entertainment, DJs, food vendors, community-group stalls as well as a curated artisan alley with dozens of Northern California artists. Due to community pressure the fair restructured the organization and partnered with local charities to collect gate donations and partner with groups at the beverages booths to raise money for those charities.

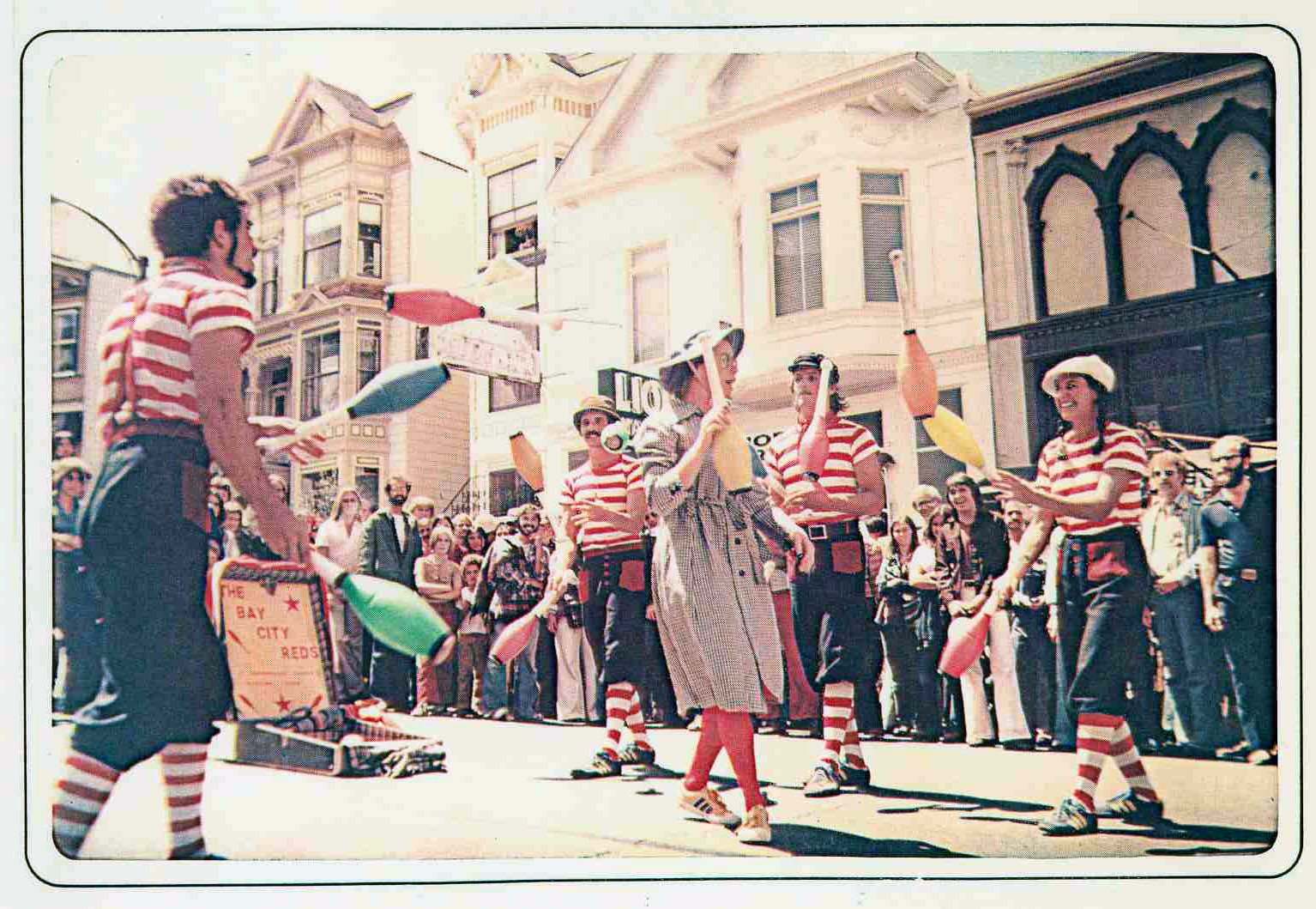
Jugglers at the fair in 1975

The Castro Street Fair was founded by Harvey Milk, and the group he led, the Castro Valley Association, in 1974. It attracted over 5,000 people. The event's popularity grew quickly and by 1977, the attendance reached 70,000. The influx of visitors helped promote the Castro district's growing tourist industry.

Castro Street Fair is one of San Francisco's many street fairs, including the North Beach Festival, Union Street Festival and Haight Street Fair. These fairs run throughout the summer, from spring to fall. The Castro Street fair takes place on the afternoon of the first Sunday in October. The large turn-out makes it one of the largest of the annual street events in San Francisco, behind San Francisco Pride in Civic Center, Folsom Street Fair south of Market Street, Pink Saturday in the Castro, and the Union Street Festival.

The fair went on hiatus in 2020 (due to the COVID19-pandemic) and returned in 2021.

== See also ==
- LGBT culture in San Francisco
