= Pink Saturday =

Former street party in San Francisco, California

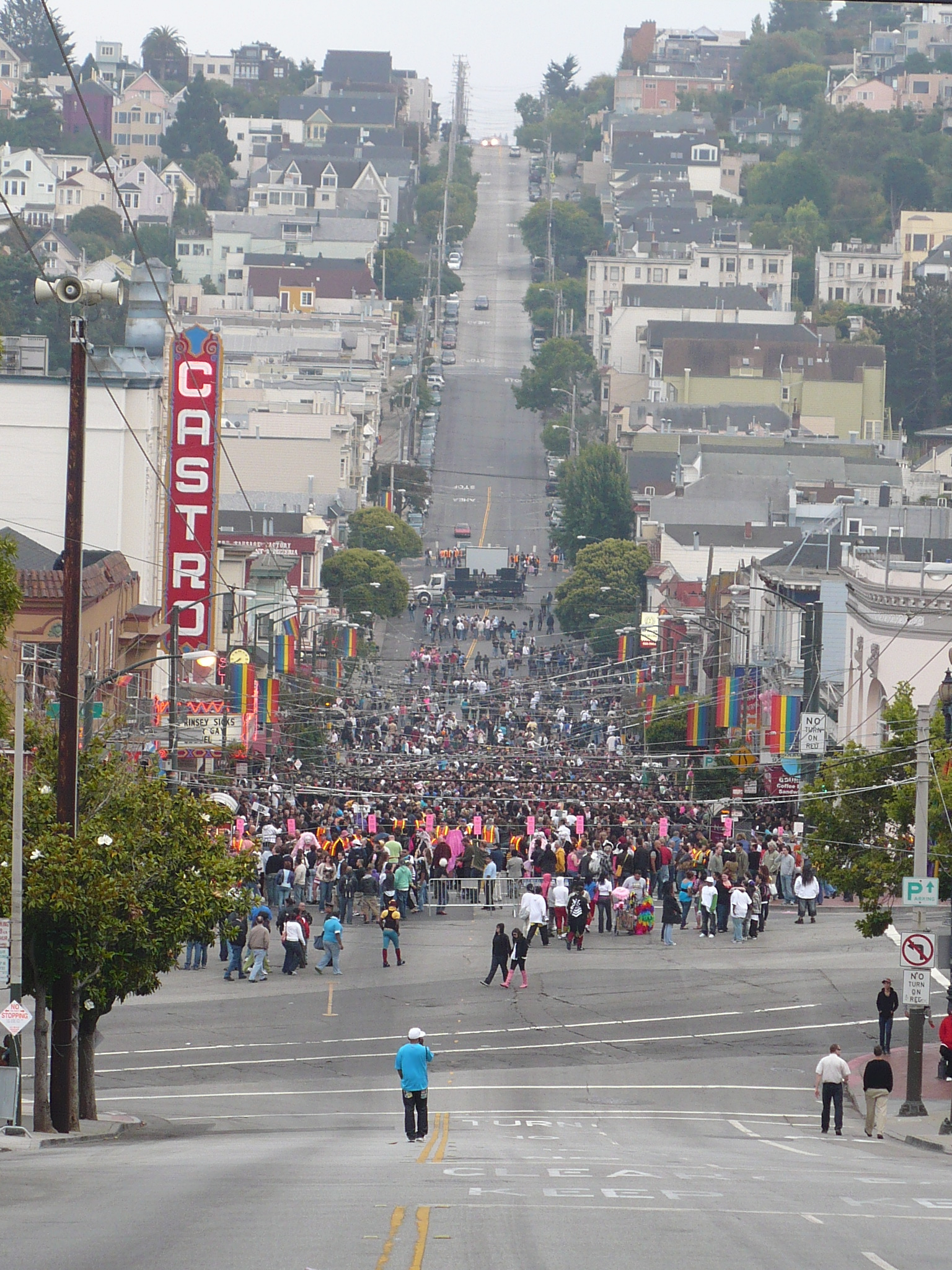
Pink Saturday 2008

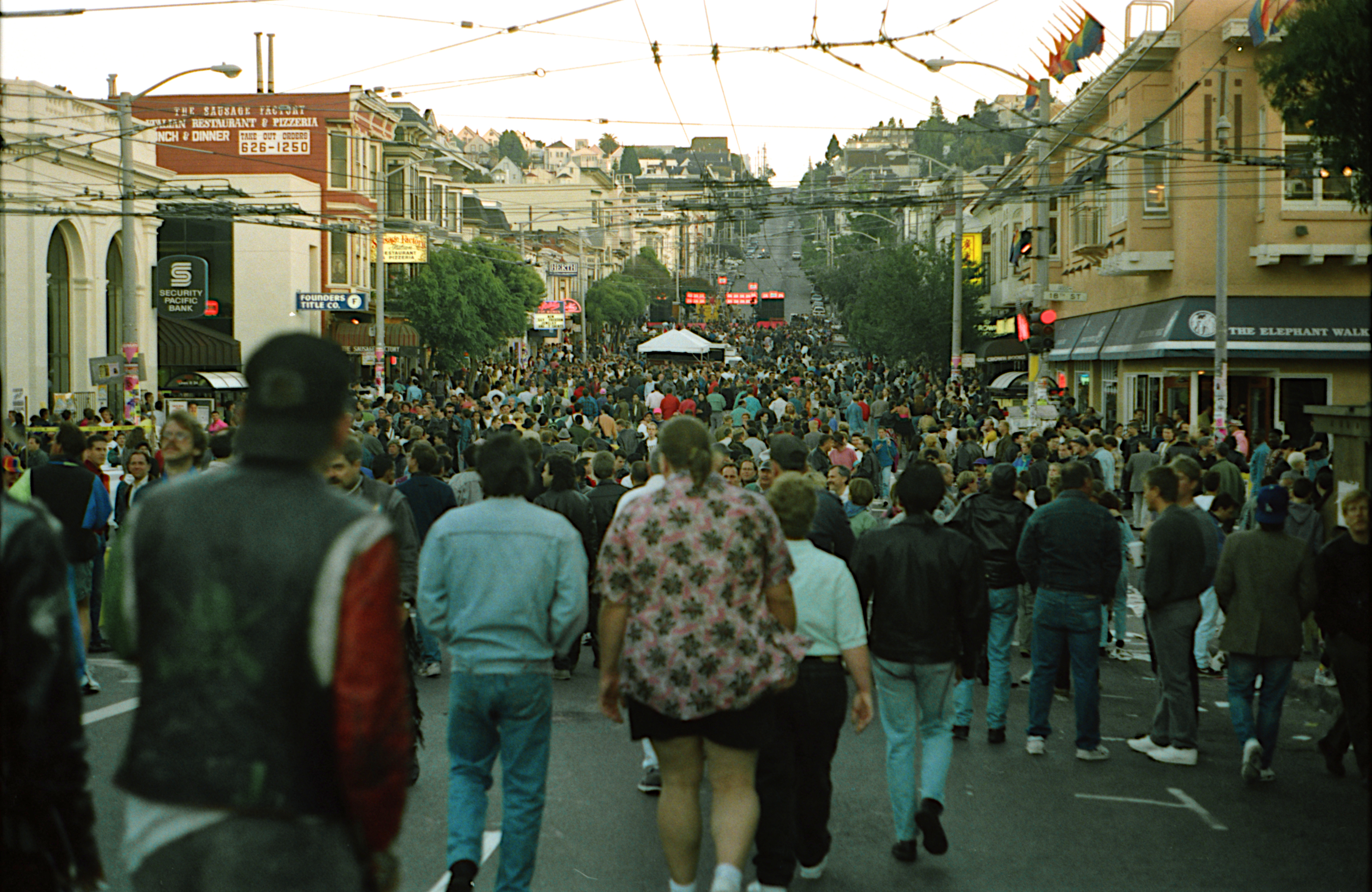
Pink Saturday 1991

Pink Saturday was a street party held the Saturday night before San Francisco Pride (Gay Pride Day) in San Francisco's Castro district. It coincided with the annual Dyke March in San Francisco. The last event was held in 2014.

The Sisters of Perpetual Indulgence had a lead role, but they stepped away from producing the event in 2015 after determining they couldn’t guarantee the safety of attendees.

Attendees were asked to donate money at the gate. Gate donations in 2008 were around $20,000.

In 2009, the event's estimated attendance was 100,000 people, and cost $150,000.

In 2013, after the US Supreme Court struck down Defense of Marriage Act (DOMA) and California's Proposition 8 on 26 June, clearing the way for same sex marriages in all 50 States, attendance at Pink Saturday 2 days later significantly increased.

== 2010 shooting ==
During the 2010 Pink Saturday, on 26 June, 19-year-old Stephen Powell was killed after being shot four times in the chest. Two others were injured after being shot in the leg. A 20-year-old man named Ed Perkins was arrested in connection with the shooting. Perkins knew Powell, but did not know the two others. The shooting was not a hate crime, occurred outside the actual Pink Saturday event area, and was reported as gang-related.

== See also ==
- LGBT culture in San Francisco
