= Harvey Milk (disambiguation) =

Harvey Milk (1930–1978) was an American politician and LGBT rights activist.

Harvey Milk may also refer to:

- Harvey Milk (band), an American rock band
- Harvey Milk (opera), a 1995 opera by Stewart Wallace
- Harvey Milk High School, an LGBT high school in New York City
- Harvey Milk LGBTQ Democratic Club, a San Francisco political organization

== See also ==
- Harvey Milk Day, a holiday celebrating the civil rights leader
- Milk (2008 American film), a 2008 biographical film on Harvey Milk
- Moscone–Milk assassinations, the 1978 assassinations of mayor George Moscone and Harvey Milk
- The Times of Harvey Milk, a 1984 documentary film on Harvey Milk
- USNS Harvey Milk (T-AO-206)
