= Anne Kronenberg =

American politician and LGBT rights activist

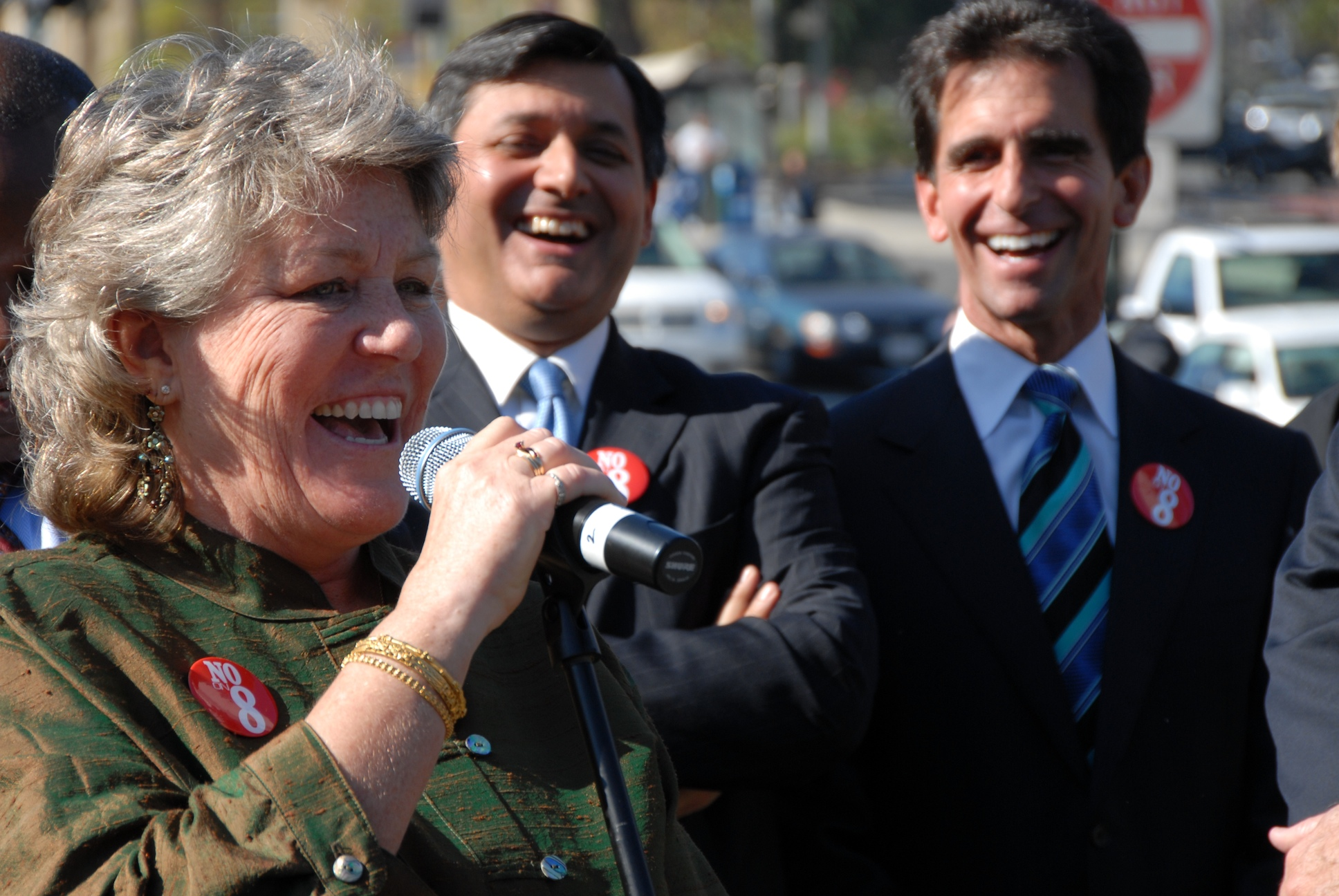
- Kronenberg speaks at Harvey Milk Streetcar Dedication.
- Citizenship: United States
- Occupations: Public service, US LGBT advocate
- Known for: Harvey Milk, San Francisco Dept. of Emergency Management, Milk, Harvey Milk Foundation
- Children: 3

Anne Kronenberg is an American former political administrator and LGBT rights activist. She is best known for being Harvey Milk's campaign manager during his historic San Francisco Board of Supervisors campaign in 1977 and his aide as he held that office until he and mayor George Moscone were assassinated. As an openly lesbian political activist, Kronenberg was noted for her instrumental role in the gay rights movement, both for Milk's campaign and in her own right.

Kronenberg appeared in the 1984 documentary film The Times of Harvey Milk and her role in Milk's life was portrayed in the Academy Award-winning 2008 film Milk. Kronenberg was one of the grand marshals of the 2009 New York City LGBT Pride parade, joining the film's writer Dustin Lance Black and AIDS activist Cleve Jones who also worked with Milk.

Kronenberg was the executive director of the San Francisco Department of Emergency Management, and she is known globally through her public appearances in her role as co-founder of the Harvey Milk Foundation.

== Response to Milk's assassination ==
Kronenberg was on a plane flying to Seattle when Milk was assassinated on November 27, 1978. At the airport, her family told her Milk had been shot, and she immediately got on the next plane back to San Francisco. She said later that they did not know at the time that the murderer was Dan White, and had feared that a gunman was targeting gays. "It was a scary, very sad, horrible day," she said. Kronenberg participated in the candlelight vigil honoring Milk and was the keynote speaker at his memorial service at the San Francisco War Memorial Opera House.

Following Milk's assassination, Kronenberg received "an immense base of broad support" to replace Milk on the San Francisco Board of Supervisors, but was passed up for Harry Britt by Dianne Feinstein.

== Work after Milk's campaign ==
Kronenberg began chairing the San Francisco Board of Supervisors' Single Room Occupancy Task Force at its inception in 1998. She worked with the administration and planning of the San Francisco Department of Public Health for nearly 15 years, being elevated to the position of deputy director. Kronenberg has also worked at the local, state, and federal levels for such politicians as Senator Ted Kennedy and Assemblyman John Vasconcellos. She retired from public service in 2018.

== Work in State and San Francisco government ==
Following work in the State Legislature, Kronenberg was deputy director for Administration and Planning of the San Francisco Department of Public Health and is a former executive director of the SF Department of Emergency Management. She also served as a board member appointed by the Governor to the State Board of Podiatric Medicine (BPM) during this period.

While Kronenberg identified as a lesbian in the 1970s, she later fell in love with a man she met in Washington, D.C. in the 1980s, whom she later married. She currently lives in California with her husband, stepson, daughter and son.

Kronenberg was one of the official grand marshals of the 2009 NYC LGBT Pride March, produced by Heritage of Pride joining Dustin Lance Black and Cleve Jones on June 28, 2009.

Kronenberg co-founded the international (NGO) non governmental non-profit Harvey Milk Foundation with Harvey's nephew, a global human rights advocate, Stuart Milk and currently serves as co-chair of the annual Harvey Milk Day celebration coordinated by the Foundation.

== Portrayal in Milk ==
Kronenberg was portrayed in Milk by Canadian actress Alison Pill. Pill played the role of Kronenberg as she was during the campaign; leather-wearing, bike-riding, and helping to ease some of the social and political barriers between gay men and lesbians.

Kronenberg's response to the film was very positive. At the premiere of Milk, she said in an interview:

... Milk highlights the struggles of the lesbian and gay movement and the inner workings of the man who changed the entire nature of the movement. Harvey is loving this — I have felt his presence through the entire production of Milk. I could almost see him walking down the red carpet at the premiere, bowing, throwing kisses, and generally entertaining the masses. Harvey's life was theatre and Tuesday's premiere was the ultimate stage.

Kronenberg served as an adviser for the film and made a cameo appearance as a stenographer.

== See also ==
- LGBT culture in San Francisco
