= Stuart Milk =

American LGBT human rights activist

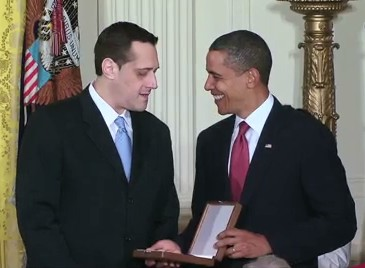
- Accepting the Presidential Medal of Freedom from President Barack Obama in August 2009 on behalf of his uncle
- Born: December 26, 1960 (age 65); New York City, New York, U.S.
- Occupations: LGBT and human rights activist
- Organization: Harvey Milk Foundation
- Political party: Democratic
- Relatives: Harvey Milk (paternal uncle)
- Awards: Muestra T (cultural and authenticity), Spain; Champion Award, Equality California; Hacham Lev Award, Keshet/Jewish Mosaic; Medal of Turin, Italy; Jose Saria International Human Rights Award, International Court System Youth Advocate of the Year; Cross Atlantic Congress Netherlands

Lawrence Stuart Milk (born December 26, 1960) is an American LGBT human rights activist and political speaker. The nephew of civil rights leader Harvey Milk, he is the co-founder of the Harvey Milk Foundation. He has engaged in domestic and international activism, including work with LGBT movements in Latin America, Europe, Asia and the Middle East.

Stuart Milk has promoted his uncle's story and addressed LGBT rights in formal major addresses on multiple continents, including before the United Kingdom House of Lords in 2012, the Italian Chamber of Deputies in 2011, the Panamanian National Assembly in 2010, and Turkish Grand Assembly in 2009. Milk is frequently quoted in international news and seen on broadcast television discussing issues of LGBT inclusion and diversity. He is also a featured writer and columnist for The Huffington Post, focusing on global human rights. During the 2012 U.S. elections, Milk gave public endorsements as a surrogate for Barack Obama and backed LGBT supporter Bob Filner over openly gay conservative Carl DeMaio in the race for mayor of San Diego; Filner narrowly won the election, becoming the first Democrat to be elected mayor of San Diego in 30 years.

== Biography ==
Milk has worked on public policy since the late 1980s in both the public and private sector, primarily on workforce issues pertaining to youth and disadvantaged populations in the U.S. and abroad. In addition to his human service work, he has been a speaker on LGBT rights at colleges, universities and public events including for Harvard University's Kennedy School of Government, University of San Francisco, SUNY, Central European University, University of Oxford, University of San Diego, as speaker or grand marshal for numerous LGBT Pride parades including San Francisco and Orlando in 2008, Istanbul and Madrid in 2009, Boston and San Diego in 2010, Pittsburgh and Budapest in 2011, as well as Tijuana and Atlanta in 2012. He has provided addresses at political conventions, including both the California Democratic Convention and Florida statewide conventions in 2009 and 2010.

In addition to his role as Milk family spokesperson, he worked to share his uncle's story at international, national and state levels. He has successfully advocated for recognition for his late uncle as an annual California state holiday, Harvey Milk Day, held since 2009 on the late Milk's birthday; the induction of his uncle into the California Hall of Fame; accepting the United States' highest civilian honor, the Presidential Medal of Freedom, on behalf of his uncle from President Obama; co-founding the international Harvey Milk Foundation; and the development of several new LGBT centers named after Harvey in foreign nations.

Milk was active in the 2012 U.S. presidential election as surrogate for incumbent Barack Obama, speaking to primarily LGBT audiences on behalf of the president at public campaign events, to the media and for the Obama For America organization. In October 2012, Stuart Milk, through his role as leader of the Harvey Milk Foundation, and Rosaria Iardino hosted a global summit on human rights inclusive of the LGBT community that brought NGO and governmental leaders from five continents to Milan, Italy. The summit was supported by the European Union, the Italian Senate, the City of Milan and Equality Italia.

== Early life and impact of his uncle ==
As reported in the San Francisco Chronicle, the 1978 assassination of his uncle destroyed the "closet door" for Stuart Milk. At the 20-year memorial of Harvey Milk's death, Stuart stated that he decided to be vocally out right after his uncle's murder, as a living and active memorial. "Earlier that year, Uncle Harvey and I had a three-hour talk at a family gathering, he talked to me about being your authentic self. I was just a teenager, but it stayed with me," Milk said.

"When I think about Uncle Harvey, I think about, even as a small child, the kind of the richness and color of life that he brought to me. Harvey was the person who introduced me to Broadway, and Broadway musicals", Stuart said in 2009.

Milk has been involved in public service since the late 1980s including directing employment assistance centers and youth enrichment programs. He told The New York Times that he sees his work in public service as part of his family's legacy. In 1999, Stuart Milk made available to the public several never before seen photos of his uncle's early campaign for elected office as well as personal family pictures.

In 1985, Milk gave his first large public address as an "out" LGBT activist alongside The Times of Harvey Milk producer Richard Schmiechen at Oberlin College. At the time, Milk was working as a campaign director for National Citizen Action, a progressive political advocacy organization.

== Current work and activism ==
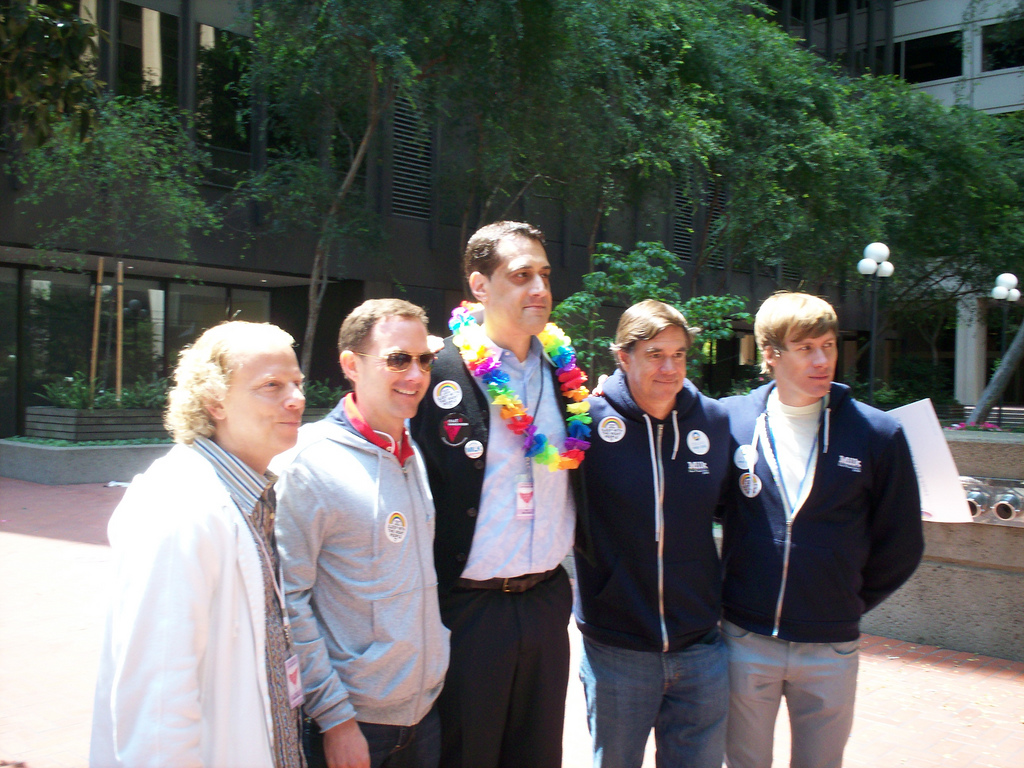
(l. to r.) The two Milk producers Bruce Cohen and Dan Jinks, Stuart, director Gus Van Sant and screenwriter Dustin Lance Black

In addition to being the President of the Harvey Milk Foundation's Board of Directors, Milk also sits as a director on boards and advisory boards of numerous human rights, LGBT rights and youth advocacy organizations including the American Foundation for Equal Rights (AFER), Equality California, International Conference on Disadvantaged Youth, the Coalition for Workforce Solutions, and the International Committee for Minority Justice and Equality.

Milk has travelled to foreign nations advocating for human rights inclusive of the LGBT community while working collaboratively with other diminished and marginalized populations. Milk's speaking events have included LGBT public speeches in Istanbul, Ankara, and Cairo to public events in Central and Eastern Europe, Central American and South American cities, as well as activities in Asia and the Pacific Rim. In addition to twice giving the keynote addresses for International Congresses in the Netherlands, Milk has been a delegate on official sister city visitations or state visits to Sydney, Australia; Panama City, Panama; and Cape Town, South Africa.

Milk was involved with getting legislation signed to create an annual California State Day of Recognition named after his late uncle in 2009. His involvement was cited as a reason he received Equality California's Champion Award that year. In 2010 he worked with then California First Lady Maria Shriver in designing the first public museum exhibit on Harvey Milk in Sacramento, and he accepted his uncle's medal and induction into the California Hall of Fame from Governor Arnold Schwarzenegger.

Harvey Milk Day activities are now held around the world every May 22—Milk's birthday—and are facilitated annually by the Harvey Milk Foundation. The foundation encourages organizers of Harvey Milk Day events to promote the unity of all marginalized minorities.

Stuart Milk participated in efforts to have a U.S. postage stamp named for Harvey Milk, the first for a self-identified LGBT person. The successful "Harvey Milk U.S. Postage Stamp Campaign" was also supported by LGBT organizations including the International Court System, Equality California, National Gay and Lesbian Task Force, Human Rights Campaign, Victory Fund, The Trevor Project, and GLAAD. The Harvey Milk stamp was released on May 22, 2014, on what would have been Milk's 84th birthday, with an official first-day-of-issue ceremony taking place at the White House. It featured a black-and-white photograph of a smiling Milk in front of his Castro Street Camera store, along with a rainbow stripe.

Following a meeting with Milk during his 2011 "Human Rights Tour" for Equality Italia, Italy's Minister of Equal Opportunities, Mara Carafagna, publicly reversed her opposition to a proposed anti-homophobia law saying "I now see it is important for my government to protect against homophobia and create gay friendly workplaces".

Milk helped develop a 2011 professional international conference for youth educators working along with the Center For Excellence in School Counseling at San Diego State University. Senior federal government officials, including the assistant secretary of the United States Department of Education, were brought together with San Diego Mayor Sanders, school superintendents, faculty, counselors, and parent/student advocates to define and examine best practices to support LGBT youth while in school. Milk is also involved with a Global LGBT Transitions and Interchange Congress being presented in early 2012 with the support of European Union officials and the European private sector.

== Portrayals ==
Portrayals of Stuart Milk have included his characterization in the play Dear Harvey, by Patricia Loughrey that was partly based on Loughrey's interviews and discussions with Stuart. The play has been performed at the Kennedy Center in Washington, D.C., at New York City's Fringe Festival and at colleges and universities across the United States. Dear Harvey has been translated into Spanish for production in Mexico and Spain while Stuart Milk's character was performed by actor Chad Allen in the spring 2010 production in Sacramento.

== Honors and awards ==
Milk has been the recipient of international and national awards for his global civil rights work, including Spain's Annual Muestra T (cultural authenticity) in 2008, Keshet/Jewish Mosaic's Hacham and Hachamat Lev Award in 2010, the José Sarria International Human Rights Award from the International Court in 2007, the Equality Champion of the Year Award from Equality California in 2009, and was the 2011 recipient of the Medal of Turin.
