= Harvey Milk =

American gay rights activist (1930–1978)

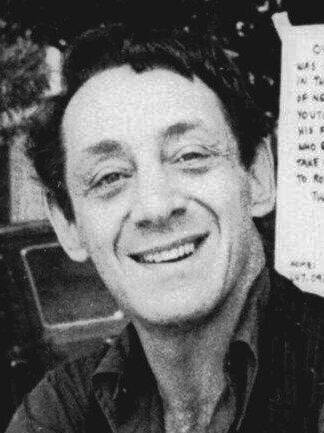
- Milk in 1977

Member of the San Francisco Board of Supervisors from the 5th district
- In office January 8 – November 27, 1978
- Preceded by: Constituency established
- Succeeded by: Harry Britt

Personal details
- Born: Harvey Bernard Milk; May 22, 1930 Woodmere, New York, U.S.
- Died: November 27, 1978 (aged 48) San Francisco, California, U.S.
- Cause of death: Assassination by gunshot
- Party: Democratic
- Relatives: Stuart Milk (nephew)
- Education: State University of New York, Albany (BA)
- Awards: Presidential Medal of Freedom (2009, posthumously)

Military service
- Allegiance: United States
- Branch/service: United States Navy
- Years of service: 1951–1955
- Rank: Lieutenant (junior grade)
- Unit: USS Kittiwake (ASR-13)

Harvey Bernard Milk (May 22, 1930 – November 27, 1978) was an American politician and the first openly gay man to be elected to public office in California, as a member of the San Francisco Board of Supervisors.

Milk was born and raised in New York. He acknowledged his homosexuality in adolescence, but secretly pursued sexual relationships well into adulthood. The counterculture of the 1960s caused him to shed many of his conservative views about individual freedom and sexual expression. Milk moved to San Francisco in 1972 and opened a camera store. After holding an assortment of jobs and frequently changing addresses, he settled in the Castro, a neighborhood that was experiencing a mass immigration of gay men and lesbians. He ran for city supervisor in 1973, but the existing gay political establishment resisted him. Milk's campaign was compared to theater due to his personality, earning media attention and votes, although not enough to be elected. He campaigned again in the next two supervisor elections, dubbing himself the "Mayor of Castro Street". The voter response caused him to also run for the California State Assembly. Due to his growing popularity, he led the gay rights movement in battles against anti-gay initiatives. Milk was elected city supervisor in 1977 after San Francisco began to choose neighborhood representatives rather than city-wide ones. During Milk's almost eleven months in office, he sponsored a bill banning discrimination based on sexual orientation in public accommodations, housing, and employment. The supervisors passed the bill by a vote of 11–1, and Mayor George Moscone signed it into law. On November 27, 1978, Milk and Moscone were assassinated by Dan White, a disgruntled former city supervisor who cast the sole vote against Milk's bill.

Despite his short political career, Milk became an icon in San Francisco and a martyr in the LGBTQ community. (Note: Milk was described as a martyr by news outlets as early as 1979, by biographer Randy Shilts in 1982, and University of San Francisco professor Peter Novak in 2003. United Press International [October 15, 1979]; printed in the Edmonton Journal, p. B10; Skelton, Nancy; Stein, Mark [October 22, 1985]. S.F. Assassin Dan White Kills Himself, Los Angeles Times, Retrieved on February 3, 2012.; Shilts, p. 348; Nolte, Carl [November 26, 2003]. "City Hall Slayings: 25 Years Later", San Francisco Chronicle, p. A-1.) In 2002, Milk was called "the most famous and most significant openly LGBTQ official ever elected in the United States". Anne Kronenberg, his final campaign manager, wrote of him: "What set Harvey apart from you or me was that he was a visionary. He imagined a righteous world inside his head and then he set about to create it for real, for all of us." Milk was posthumously awarded the Presidential Medal of Freedom in 2009.

== Early life ==
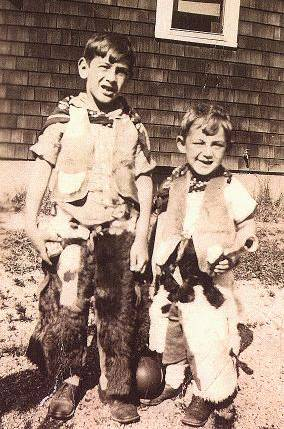
Harvey Milk (right) and his older brother Robert in 1934

Harvey Bernard Milk was born on May 22, 1930, in Woodmere, New York, on Long Island. His father is William Milk and his mother is Minerva Karns. He was the younger son of Litvak parents and the grandson of Morris Milk, a department store owner who helped to organize the first synagogue in the area. Milk was raised in a Jewish household. His mother kept a kosher home. Although as an adult he did not consider himself a religious person, his connection to the Jewish faith profoundly shaped his worldview. His family experienced great discrimination for being Jewish. His grandfather, who created the first synagogue in the town, was a Yiddish-speaking peddler who came to America from Lithuania. As a child, Milk was teased for his protruding ears, big nose, and oversized feet, and tended to grab attention as a class clown. While he was in school, he played football and developed a passion for opera. Under his name in the high school yearbook, it read, "Glimpy Milk—and they say WOMEN are never at a loss for words".

Milk graduated from Bay Shore High School in Bay Shore, New York, in 1947 and attended New York State College for Teachers in Albany (now the State University of New York at Albany) from 1947 to 1951, majoring in mathematics. He also wrote for the college newspaper. One classmate remembered, "He was never thought of as a possible queer—that's what you called them then—he was a man's man".

=== Early career ===
After graduation, Milk joined the United States Navy during the Korean War. He served aboard the submarine rescue ship USS Kittiwake (ASR-13) as a diving officer. Milk later transferred to Naval Station, San Diego, to serve as a diving instructor. In 1955, he resigned from the Navy at the rank of Lieutenant (junior grade), forced to accept an "other than honorable" discharge and leave the service rather than be court-martialed because of his homosexuality. (Note: While Milk said numerous times that he was dishonorably discharged and claimed it was because he was gay, for a number of years this claim was doubted. For example, his biographer Randy Shilts was skeptical of this claim, stating: "The Harvey Milk of this era was no political activist, and according to available evidence, he played the more typical balancing act between discretion and his sex drive." In addition, the Harvey Milk Archives-Scott Smith Collection included a photocopy of what appeared to be Milk's honorable discharge paperwork from the U.S. Navy. However, a records request from the U.S. Navy revealed that he did indeed receive an "other than honorable" discharge and was forced to resign for being gay. It appears Milk forged the discharge papers now in his archives in order to be employed after leaving the service.)

Milk's early career was marked by frequent changes; in later years he would take delight in talking about his metamorphosis from a middle-class Jewish boy. He began teaching at George W. Hewlett High School on Long Island. In 1956, he met Joe Campbell at the Jacob Riis Park beach, a popular cruising location for gay men in Queens. Milk pursued Campbell passionately. Milk continued to write Campbell romantic notes and poems after they moved in together. Seeking a warmer climate with milder winters, Milk and Campbell left New York in 1957 and moved to Dallas; after they struggled to find employment and were disappointed with the city's social scene compared to New York, they moved back to New York. In New York, Milk worked as a public school teacher on Long Island and then a stock analyst in Manhattan. In 1961, Campbell and Milk separated after almost six years.

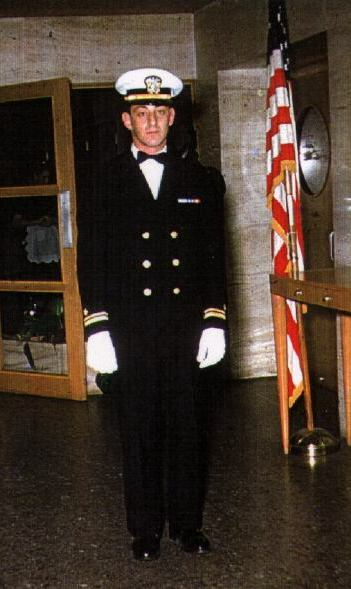
Milk, dressed for his brother's wedding in 1954

Milk tried to keep his early romantic life separate from his family and work. Once again bored and single in New York, he thought of moving to Miami to marry a lesbian friend to "have a front and each would not be in the way of the other". However, he decided to remain in New York, where he secretly pursued gay relationships. In 1962, Milk became involved with Craig Rodwell, who was 10 years younger. Though Milk courted Rodwell ardently, waking him every morning with a call and sending him notes, Milk was uncomfortable with Rodwell's involvement with the New York Mattachine Society, a gay-rights organization. When Rodwell was arrested for walking in Riis Park, and charged with inciting a riot and with indecent exposure (the law required men's swimsuits to extend from above the navel to below the thigh), he spent three days in jail. The relationship soon ended as Milk became alarmed at Rodwell's tendency to agitate the police. (Note: In addition to his concerns over Rodwell's activism, Milk believed that Rodwell had given him gonorrhea. (Carter, pp. 31–32.))

Milk abruptly stopped working as an insurance actuary and became a researcher at the Wall Street firm Bache & Company. He was frequently promoted despite his tendency to offend the older members of the firm by ignoring their advice and flaunting his success. Although he was skilled at his job, co-workers sensed that Milk's heart was not in his work. Before Milk's thirty-fourth birthday, he entered a romantic relationship with 17-year-old Jack Galen McKinley (b. October 18, 1946). Milk had recruited McKinley to work on conservative Republican Barry Goldwater's 1964 presidential campaign. McKinley was prone to depression and sometimes threatened to commit suicide if Milk did not show him enough attention. To make a point to McKinley, Milk took him to the hospital where Milk's ex-lover, Joe Campbell, was himself recuperating from a suicide attempt after his lover Billy Sipple left him. Milk had remained friendly with Campbell, who had entered the avant-garde art scene in Greenwich Village, but Milk did not understand why Campbell's despondency caused him to consider committing suicide.

=== Castro Street ===
Since the end of World War II, the major port city of San Francisco had been home to a sizable number of gay men who had been expelled from the military and decided to stay rather than return to their hometowns and face ostracism. By 1969, the Kinsey Institute believed San Francisco had more gay people per capita than any other American city. When the National Institute of Mental Health asked the institute to survey homosexuals, the Institute chose San Francisco as its focus. Milk and McKinley were among the thousands of gay men attracted to San Francisco. McKinley was a stage manager for Tom O'Horgan, a director who started his career in experimental theater, but soon graduated to much larger Broadway productions. They arrived in 1969 with the Broadway touring company of Hair. McKinley was offered a job in the New York City production of Jesus Christ Superstar, and their tempestuous relationship came to an end. The city appealed to Milk so much that he decided to stay, working at an investment firm. In 1970, increasingly frustrated with the political climate after the U.S. invasion of Cambodia, Milk let his hair grow long. When told to cut it, he refused and was fired.

Milk drifted from California to Texas to New York, without a steady job or plan. In New York City he became involved with O'Horgan's theater company as a "general aide", signing on as associate producer for Lenny and for Eve Merriam's Inner City. The time he had spent with the cast of flower children wore away much of Milk's conservatism. A contemporary New York Times story about O'Horgan described Milk as "a sad eyed man—another aging hippie with long, long hair, wearing faded jeans and pretty beads". Craig Rodwell read the description of the formerly uptight man and wondered if it could be the same person. One of Milk's Wall Street friends worried that he seemed to have no plan or future, but remembered Milk's attitude: "I think he was happier than at any time I had ever seen him in his entire life." Rosa von Praunheim's documentary short film Homosexuals in New York shows Milk exuberant as a protester on Christopher Street Day 1971 in New York City. Milk met Scott Smith, 18 years his junior, and began another relationship. Milk and Smith returned to San Francisco, where they lived on money they had saved. In March 1973, after a roll of film Milk left at a local shop was ruined, he and Smith opened a camera store on Castro Street with their last $1,000.

=== Changing politics ===
In the late 1960s, the Society for Individual Rights (SIR) and the Daughters of Bilitis (DOB) began to work against police persecution of gay bars and entrapment in San Francisco. Oral sex was still a felony, and in 1970, nearly 90 people in the city were arrested for having sex in public parks at night. Mayor Joseph Alioto asked the police to target the parks, hoping the decision would appeal to the Archdiocese and his Catholic supporters. In 1971, 2,800 gay men were arrested for public sex in San Francisco. By comparison, New York City recorded only 63 arrests for the same offense that year. Any arrest for a morals charge required registration as a sex offender.

Congressman Phillip Burton, Assemblyman Willie Brown, and other California politicians recognized the growing clout and organization of homosexuals in the city, and courted their votes by attending meetings of gay and lesbian organizations. Brown pushed for legalization of sex between consenting adults in 1969 but failed. SIR was also pursued by popular moderate Supervisor Dianne Feinstein in her bid to become mayor, opposing Alioto. Ex-policeman Richard Hongisto worked for 10 years to change the conservative views of the San Francisco Police Department, and also actively appealed to the gay community, which responded by raising significant funds for his campaign for sheriff. Though Feinstein was unsuccessful, Hongisto's win in 1971 showed the political clout of the gay community.

SIR had become powerful enough for political maneuvering. In 1971, SIR members Jim Foster, Rick Stokes, and Advocate publisher David B. Goodstein formed the Alice B. Toklas Memorial Democratic Club, known simply as "Alice". Alice befriended liberal politicians to persuade them to sponsor bills, proving successful in 1972 when Del Martin and Phyllis Lyon obtained Feinstein's support for an ordinance outlawing employment discrimination on the basis of sexual orientation. Alice chose Stokes to run for a relatively unimportant seat on the community college board. Though Stokes received 45,000 votes, he was quiet and unassuming, and did not win. Foster, however, shot to national prominence by being the first openly gay man to address a political convention. His speech at the 1972 Democratic National Convention ensured that his voice, according to San Francisco politicians, was the one to be heard when they wanted the opinions, and especially the votes, of the gay community.

Milk became more interested in political and civic matters when he was faced with civic problems and policies he disliked. One day in 1973, a state bureaucrat entered Milk's shop, Castro Camera, and informed him that he owed $100 as a deposit against state sales tax. Milk was incredulous and traded shouts with the man about the rights of business owners; after he complained for weeks at state offices, the deposit was reduced to $30. Milk fumed about government priorities when a teacher came into his store to borrow a projector because the equipment in the schools did not function. Friends also remember around the same time having to restrain him from kicking the television while Attorney General John N. Mitchell gave consistent "I don't recall" replies during the Watergate hearings. Milk decided that the time had come to run for city supervisor. He said later, "I finally reached the point where I knew I had to become involved or shut up".

== Campaigns ==
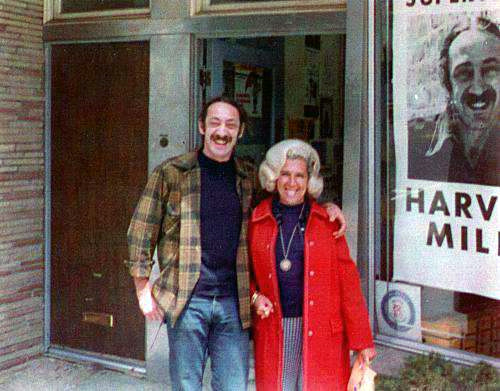
Milk, here with his sister-in-law in front of Castro Camera in 1973

Milk received an icy reception from the gay political establishment in San Francisco. Jim Foster, who had by then been active in gay politics for ten years, resented that the newcomer had asked for his endorsement for a position as prestigious as city supervisor. Foster told Milk, "There's an old saying in the Democratic Party. You don't get to dance unless you put up the chairs. I've never seen you put up the chairs." Milk was furious that Foster had snubbed him for the position, and the conversation marked the beginning of an antagonistic relationship between the "Alice" Club and Milk. Some gay bar owners, still battling police harassment and unhappy with what they saw as a timid approach by Alice to established authority in the city, decided to endorse him.

Milk had drifted through life up to this point, but he found his vocation, according to journalist Frances FitzGerald, who called him a "born politician". At first, his inexperience showed. He tried to do without money, support, or staff, and instead relied on his message of sound financial management, promoting individuals over large corporations and government. He supported the reorganization of supervisor elections from a citywide ballot to district ballots, which was intended to reduce the influence of money and give neighborhoods more control over their representatives in city government. He also ran on a culturally liberal platform, opposing government interference in private sexual matters and favoring the legalization of marijuana. Milk's fiery, flamboyant speeches and savvy media skills earned him a significant amount of press during the 1973 election. He earned 16,900 votes—sweeping the Castro District and other liberal neighborhoods and coming in 10th place out of 32 candidates. Had the elections been reorganized to allow districts to elect their own supervisors, he would have won.

=== Mayor of Castro Street ===
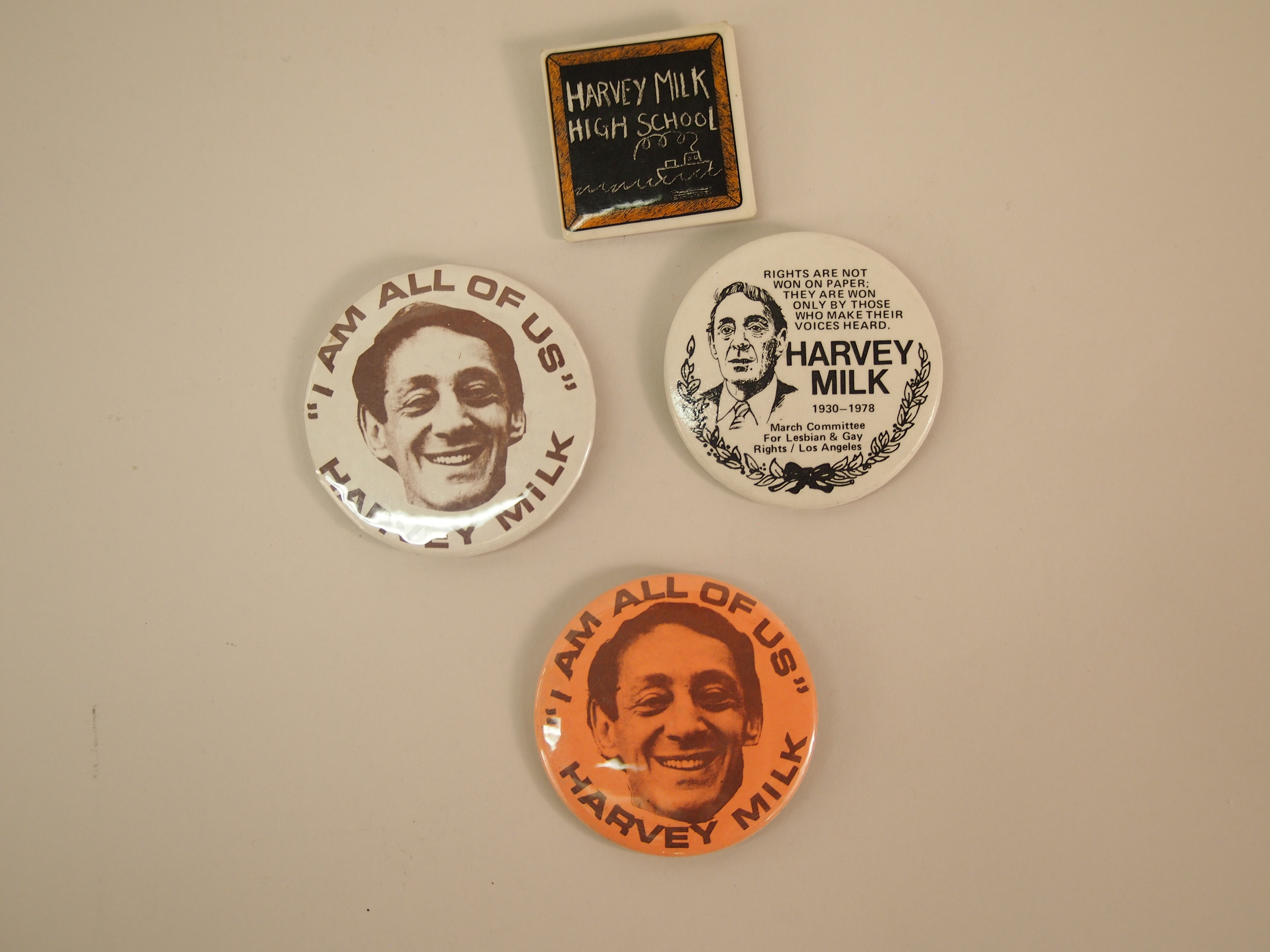
Harvey Milk buttons

From early in his political career, Milk displayed an affinity for building coalitions. The Teamsters wanted to strike against beer distributors—Coors in particular—who refused to sign the union contract. An organizer asked Milk for assistance with gay bars; in return, Milk asked the union to hire more gay drivers. A few days later, Milk canvassed the gay bars in and surrounding the Castro District, urging them to refuse to sell the beer. With the help of a coalition of Arab and Chinese grocers the Teamsters had also recruited, the boycott was successful. Milk found a strong political ally in organized labor, and it was around this time that he began to style himself "The Mayor of Castro Street". As Castro Street's presence grew, so did Milk's reputation. Tom O'Horgan remarked, "Harvey spent most of his life looking for a stage. On Castro Street he finally found it."

Tensions were growing between the older citizens of the Most Holy Redeemer Parish and the gay people who were entering the Castro District. In 1973, two gay men tried to open an antique shop, but the Eureka Valley Merchants Association (EVMA) attempted to prevent them from receiving a business license. Milk and a few other gay business owners founded the Castro Village Association, with Milk as the president. He often repeated his philosophy that gays should buy from gay businesses. Milk organized the Castro Street Fair in 1974 to attract more customers to the area. More than 5,000 attended, and some of the EVMA members were stunned; they did more business at the Castro Street Fair than on any previous day.

=== Serious candidate ===
Although he was a newcomer to the Castro District, Milk had shown leadership in the small community. He was starting to be taken seriously as a candidate and decided to run again for supervisor in 1975. He reconsidered his approach and cut his long hair, swore off marijuana, and vowed never to visit another gay bathhouse again. Milk's campaigning earned the support of the teamsters, firefighters, and construction unions. His store, Castro Camera, became the center of activity in the neighborhood. Milk would often pull people off the street to work his campaigns—many discovered later that they just happened to be the type of men Milk found attractive.

Milk favored support for small businesses and the growth of neighborhoods. Since 1968, Mayor Joseph Alioto had been luring large corporations to the city despite what critics labeled "the Manhattanization of San Francisco". As blue-collar jobs were replaced by the service industry, Alioto's weakened political base allowed for new leadership to be voted into office in the city. In 1975, state senator George Moscone was elected mayor. Moscone had been instrumental in repealing the sodomy law earlier that year in the California State Legislature. He acknowledged Milk's influence in his election by visiting Milk's election night headquarters, thanking Milk personally, and offering him a position as a city commissioner. Milk came in seventh place in the election, only one position away from earning a supervisor seat.

Despite the new leadership in the city, there were still conservative strongholds. In one of Moscone's first acts as mayor, he appointed a police chief to the embattled San Francisco Police Department (SFPD). He chose Charles Gain, against the wishes of the SFPD. Most of the force disliked Gain for criticizing the police in the press for racial insensitivity and alcohol abuse on the job, instead of working within the command structure to change attitudes. (Note: Gain further alienated the SFPD by attending a raucous party in 1977 called the Hooker's Ball. The party grew out of control and Gain had to call in reinforcements to control the excesses, but a photograph ran in the papers of him holding a champagne bottle while standing beside prostitution rights activist Margo St. James and a drag queen named "Wonder Whore". (Weiss, pp. 156–157.)) By request of the mayor, Gain made it clear that gay police officers would be welcomed in the department; this became national news. Police under Gain expressed their hatred of him, and of the mayor for betraying them.

=== Outing of Oliver Sipple ===
Milk's role as a representative of San Francisco's gay community expanded during this period. On September 22, 1975, President Gerald Ford, while visiting San Francisco, walked from his hotel to his car. In the crowd, Sara Jane Moore raised a gun to shoot him. Oliver "Bill" Sipple, a former Marine who had been walking by, grabbed her arm as the gun discharged toward the pavement. The incident drew attention to Sipple. On psychiatric disability leave from the military, Sipple refused to call himself a hero and did not want his sexuality disclosed. Milk, however, took advantage of the opportunity to illustrate his cause that the public perception of gay people would be improved if they came out of the closet. He told a friend: "It's too good an opportunity. For once we can show that gays do heroic things, not just all that ca-ca about molesting children and hanging out in bathrooms." Milk contacted a newspaper.

Several days later, Herb Caen, a columnist at the San Francisco Chronicle, outed Sipple as gay and exposed him as a friend of Milk. The announcement was picked up by national newspapers, and Milk's name was included in many of the stories. Time magazine named Milk as a leader in San Francisco's gay community. Sipple was besieged by reporters, as was his family. His mother, a staunch Baptist in Detroit, refused to speak to him. Although he had been involved with the gay community for years, participating in Gay Pride events, Sipple sued the Chronicle for invasion of privacy. President Ford sent Sipple a note of thanks for saving his life. Milk claimed that Sipple's sexual orientation was the reason he received only a note, rather than an invitation to the White House. (Note: Sipple's case was eventually rejected in 1984 in a California court of appeals. Sipple, who was wounded in the head in Vietnam, was also diagnosed as having paranoid schizophrenia. He held no ill will toward Milk, however, and remained in contact with him. The incident's significance brought so much attention that, later in life while drinking, he stated that he regretted having grabbed Moore's gun. Eventually, Sipple regained contact with his mother and brother, but continued to be rejected by his father. He kept the letter written by Ford, framed, in his apartment, until he died of pneumonia in 1989. ("Sorrow Trailed a Veteran Who Saved a President's Life", Los Angeles Times, [February 13, 1989], p. 1.))

=== Race for State Assembly ===
Keeping his promise to Milk, newly elected Mayor George Moscone appointed him to the Board of Permit Appeals in 1976, making him the first openly gay city commissioner in the United States. Milk considered seeking a position in the California State Assembly. The district was weighted heavily in his favor, as much of it was based in neighborhoods surrounding Castro Street, where Milk's sympathizers voted. In the previous race for supervisor, Milk received more votes than the currently seated assemblyman. However, Moscone had made a deal with the assembly speaker that another candidate should run—Art Agnos. Furthermore, by order of the mayor, neither appointed nor elected officials were allowed to run a campaign while performing their duties.

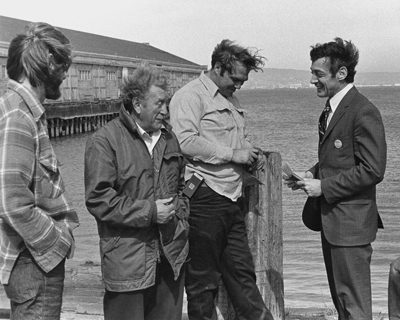
By the time of Milk's 1975 campaign, he had decided to cut his hair and wear suits. Here, Milk (far right) is campaigning with longshoremen in San Francisco during his 1976 race for the California State Assembly.

Milk spent five weeks on the Board of Permit Appeals before Moscone was forced to fire him when he announced he would run for the California State Assembly. Rick Stokes replaced him. Milk's firing, and the backroom deal made between Moscone, the assembly speaker, and Agnos, fueled his campaign as he took on the identity of a political underdog. He railed that high officers in the city and state governments were against him. He complained that the prevailing gay political establishment, particularly the Alice B. Toklas Memorial Democratic Club, were shutting him out; he referred to Jim Foster and Stokes as gay "Uncle Toms". He enthusiastically embraced a local independent weekly magazine's headline: "Harvey Milk vs. The Machine". The Alice B. Toklas Club made no endorsement in the primary—neither Milk nor Agnos—while other gay-aligned clubs and groups endorsed Agnos or did dual endorsements.

Milk's continuing campaign, run from the storefront of Castro Camera, was a study in disorganization. Although the older Irish grandmothers and gay men who volunteered were plentiful and happy to send out mass mailings, Milk's notes and volunteer lists were kept on scrap papers. Any time the campaign required funds, the money came from the cash register without any consideration for accounting. The campaign manager's assistant was an 11-year-old neighborhood girl. Milk himself was hyperactive and prone to fantastic outbursts of temper, only to recover quickly and shout excitedly about something else. Many of his rants were directed at his lover, Scott Smith, who was becoming disillusioned with the man who was no longer the laid-back hippie he had fallen in love with.

If the candidate was manic, he was also dedicated and filled with good humor, and he had a particular genius for getting media attention. He spent long hours registering voters and shaking hands at bus stops and movie theater lines. He took whatever opportunity came along to promote himself. He thoroughly enjoyed campaigning, and his success was evident. With the large numbers of volunteers, he had dozens at a time stand along the busy thoroughfare of Market Street as human billboards, holding "Milk for Assembly" signs while commuters drove into the heart of the city to work. He distributed his campaign literature anywhere he could, including one of the most influential political groups in the city, the Peoples Temple. Milk accepted Temple volunteers to work his phones. On February 19, 1978, Milk wrote a letter to President Jimmy Carter defending cult leader Jim Jones as "a man of the highest character" when asked. Milk's relationship with the Temple was similar to that of other politicians in Northern California. According to The San Francisco Examiner, Jones and his parishioners were a "potent political force", helping to elect Moscone (who appointed him to the Housing Authority), District Attorney Joseph Freitas, and Sheriff Richard Hongisto. When Milk learned Jones was backing both him and Art Agnos in 1976, he told friend Michael Wong, "Well fuck him. I'll take his workers, but, that's the game Jim Jones plays." But to his volunteers, he said: "Make sure you're always nice to the Peoples Temple. If they ask you to do something, do it, and then send them a note thanking them for asking you to do it."

The race was close, and Milk lost by fewer than 4,000 votes. Agnos taught Milk a valuable lesson when he criticized Milk's campaign speeches as "a downer ... You talk about how you're gonna throw the bums out, but how are you gonna fix things—other than beat me? You shouldn't leave your audience on a down." In the wake of his loss, Milk, realizing that the Toklas Club would never support him politically, co-founded the San Francisco Gay Democratic Club.

== Broader historical forces ==
The fledgling gay rights movement had yet to meet organized opposition in the US. In 1977 a few well-connected gay activists in Miami, Florida, were able to pass a civil rights ordinance that made discrimination based on sexual orientation illegal in Dade County. A well-organized group of conservative fundamentalist Christians responded, headed by singer Anita Bryant. Their campaign was titled Save Our Children, and Bryant claimed the ordinance infringed on her right to teach her children Biblical morality. Bryant and the campaign gathered 64,000 signatures to put the issue to a county-wide vote. With funds raised in part by the Florida Citrus Commission, for which Bryant was the spokeswoman, they ran television advertisements that contrasted the Orange Bowl Parade with San Francisco's Gay Freedom Day Parade, stating that Dade County would be turned into a "hotbed of homosexuality" where "men ... cavort with little boys". (Note: Bryant agreed to an interview with Playboy magazine, in which she was quoted saying that the civil rights ordinance "would have made it mandatory that flaunting homosexuals be hired in both the public and parochial schools ... If they're a legitimate minority, then so are nail biters, dieters, fat people, short people, and murderers." ("Playboy Interview: Anita Bryant", Playboy, (May 1978), pp. 73–96, 232–250.) Bryant would often break into her standard "Battle Hymn of the Republic" while speaking during the campaign, called homosexuals "human garbage", and blamed the drought in California on their sins. (Clendinen, p. 306.) As the special election drew near, a Florida state senator read the Book of Leviticus aloud to the Senate, and the governor went on record against the civil rights ordinance. (Duberman, p. 320.))

Jim Foster, then the most powerful political organizer in San Francisco, went to Miami to assist gay activists there as election day neared, and a nationwide boycott of orange juice was organized. The message of the Save Our Children campaign was influential, and the result was an overwhelming defeat for gay activists; in the largest turnout in any special election in the history of Dade County, 70% voted to repeal the law.

=== "Just politics" ===
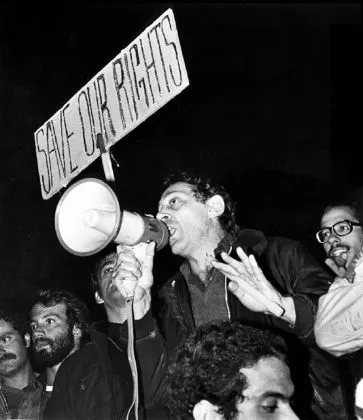
Milk speaking on the night of the Dade County ordinance vote

Christian conservatives were inspired by their victory, and saw an opportunity for a new, effective political cause. Gay activists were shocked to see how little support they received. An impromptu demonstration of over 3,000 Castro residents formed the night of the Dade County ordinance vote. Gay men and lesbians were simultaneously angry, chanting "Out of the bars and into the streets!", and elated at their passionate and powerful response. The San Francisco Examiner reported that members of the crowd pulled others out of bars along Castro and Polk Streets to "deafening" cheers. Milk led marchers that night on a five-mile (8-km) course through the city, constantly moving, aware that if they stopped for too long there would be a riot. He declared, "This is the power of the gay community. Anita's going to create a national gay force." Activists had little time to recover, however, as the scenario replayed itself when civil rights ordinances were overturned by voters in Saint Paul, Minnesota; Wichita, Kansas; and Eugene, Oregon, throughout 1977 and into 1978.

California State Senator John Briggs saw an opportunity in the Christian fundamentalists' campaign. He was hoping to be elected governor of California in 1978, and was impressed with the voter turnout he saw in Miami. When Briggs returned to Sacramento, he wrote a bill that would ban gays and lesbians from teaching in public schools throughout California. Briggs claimed in private that he had nothing against gays, telling gay journalist Randy Shilts, "It's politics. Just politics." Random attacks on gays rose in the Castro. When the police response was considered inadequate, groups of gays patrolled the neighborhood themselves, on alert for attackers. On June 21, 1977, a gay man named Robert Hillsborough died from 15 stab wounds while his attackers gathered around him and chanted "Faggot!" Both Mayor Moscone and Hillsborough's mother blamed Anita Bryant and John Briggs. One week prior to the incident, Briggs had held a press conference at San Francisco City Hall where he called the city a "sexual garbage heap" because of homosexuals. Weeks later, 250,000 people attended the 1977 San Francisco Gay Freedom Day Parade, the largest attendance at any Gay Pride event to that point.

In November 1976, voters in San Francisco decided to reorganize supervisor elections to choose supervisors from neighborhoods instead of voting for them in citywide ballots. Harvey Milk quickly qualified as the leading candidate in District 5, surrounding Castro Street.

=== Last campaign ===
The nongay community has mostly accepted it. What San Francisco is today, and what it is becoming, reflects both the energy and organization of the gay community and its developing effort toward integration in the political processes of the American city best known for innovation in life styles.

— The New York Times, November 6, 1977

Anita Bryant's public campaign opposing homosexuality and the multiple challenges to gay rights ordinances across the United States fueled gay politics in San Francisco. Seventeen candidates from the Castro District entered the next race for supervisor; more than half of them were gay. The New York Times ran an exposé on the veritable invasion of gay people into San Francisco, estimating that the city's gay population was between 100,000 and 200,000 out of a total 750,000. The Castro Village Association had grown to 90 businesses; the local bank, formerly the smallest branch in the city, had become the largest and was forced to build a wing to accommodate its new customers. Milk biographer Randy Shilts noted that his campaign was fueled by "broader historical forces".

Milk's most successful opponent was the quiet and thoughtful lawyer Rick Stokes, who was backed by the Alice B. Toklas Memorial Democratic Club. Stokes was open about his homosexuality long before Milk had come out, and had experienced more severe treatment, once hospitalized and forced to endure electroshock therapy to 'cure' him. Milk, however, was more expressive about the role of gay people and their issues in San Francisco politics. Stokes was quoted saying, "I'm just a businessman who happens to be gay," and expressed the view that any normal person could also be homosexual. Milk's contrasting populist philosophy was relayed to The New York Times: "We don't want sympathetic liberals, we want gays to represent gays ... I represent the gay street people—the 14-year-old runaway from San Antonio. We have to make up for hundreds of years of persecution. We have to give hope to that poor runaway kid from San Antonio. They go to the bars because churches are hostile. They need hope! They need a piece of the pie!"

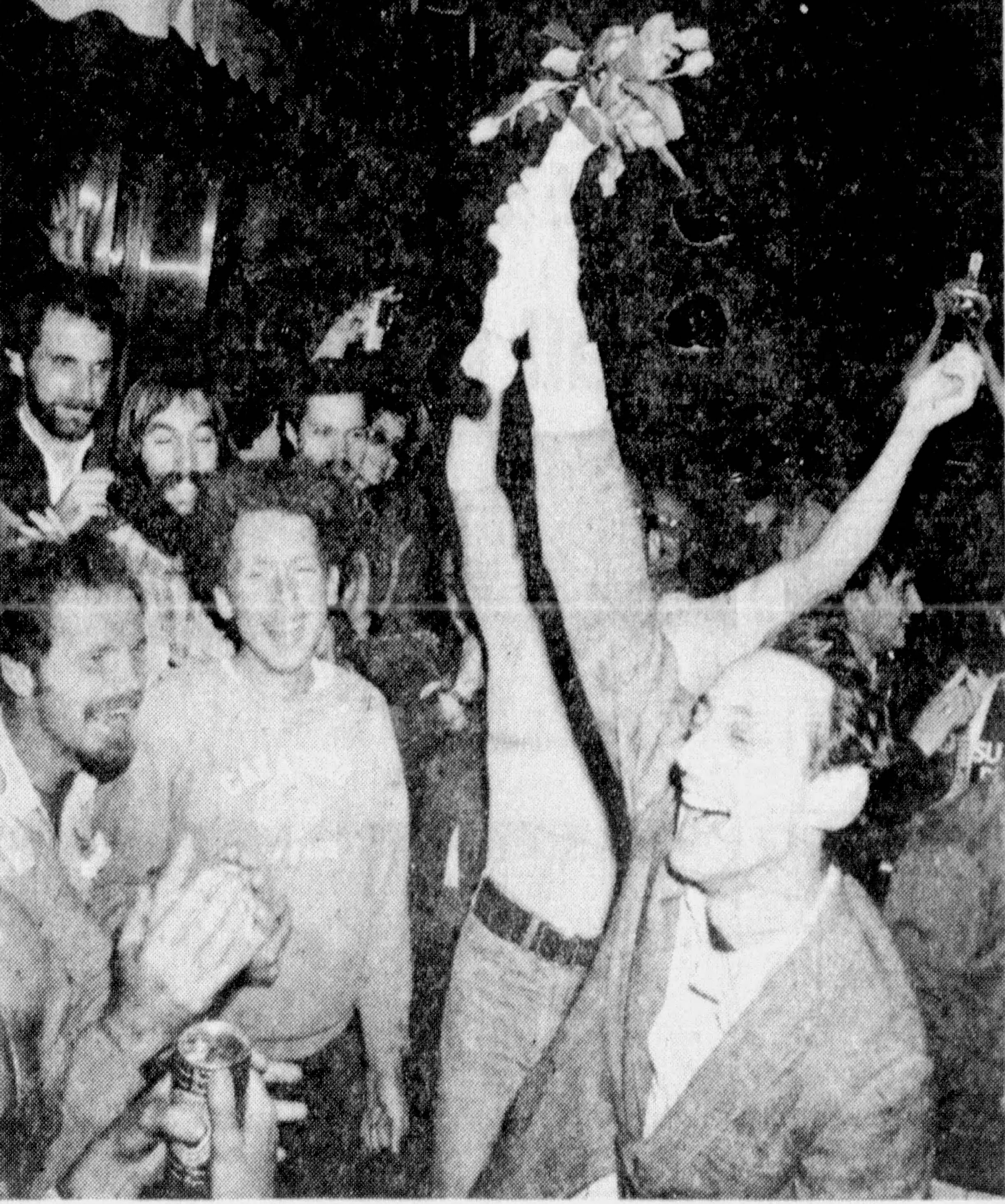
Milk (right) celebrates his election to the Board of Supervisors

Other causes were also important to Milk: he promoted larger and less expensive child care facilities, free public transportation, and the development of a board of civilians to oversee the police. He advanced important neighborhood issues at every opportunity. Milk used the same manic campaign tactics as in previous races: human billboards, hours of handshaking, and dozens of speeches calling on gay people to have hope. This time, the San Francisco Chronicle endorsed him for supervisor. On election day, November 8, 1977, he won by 30% against sixteen other candidates, and after his victory became apparent, he arrived on Castro Street on the back of his campaign manager's motorcycle—escorted by Sheriff Richard Hongisto—to what a newspaper story described as a "tumultuous and moving welcome".

Milk had recently taken a new lover, a young man named Jack Lira, who was frequently drunk in public, and just as often escorted out of political events by Milk's aides. Since the race for the California State Assembly, Milk was receiving increasingly violent death threats. Concerned that his raised profile marked him as a target for assassination, he recorded on tape his thoughts, and whom he wanted to succeed him if he were killed, adding: "If a bullet should enter my brain, let that bullet destroy every closet door".

== Supervisor ==
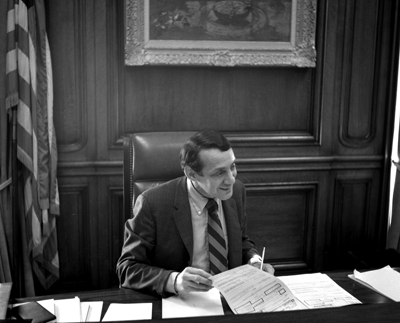
Milk sitting at the mayor's desk in 1978

Milk's swearing-in made national headlines, as he became the first non-incumbent openly gay man in the United States to win an election for public office. (Note: Two gay politicians were already in office: lesbian Massachusetts State Representative Elaine Noble and Minnesota State Senator Allan Spear, who had come out after he had been elected and won re-election.) He likened himself to pioneering African American baseball player Jackie Robinson and walked to City Hall arm in arm with Jack Lira, stating "You can stand around and throw bricks at Silly Hall or you can take it over. Well, here we are." The Castro District was not the only neighborhood to promote someone new to city politics. Sworn in with Milk were also a single mother (Carol Ruth Silver), a Chinese American (Gordon Lau), and an African American woman (Ella Hill Hutch)—all firsts for the city. Dan White, a former police officer and firefighter, was also a first-time supervisor, and he spoke of how proud he was that his grandmother was able to see him sworn in.

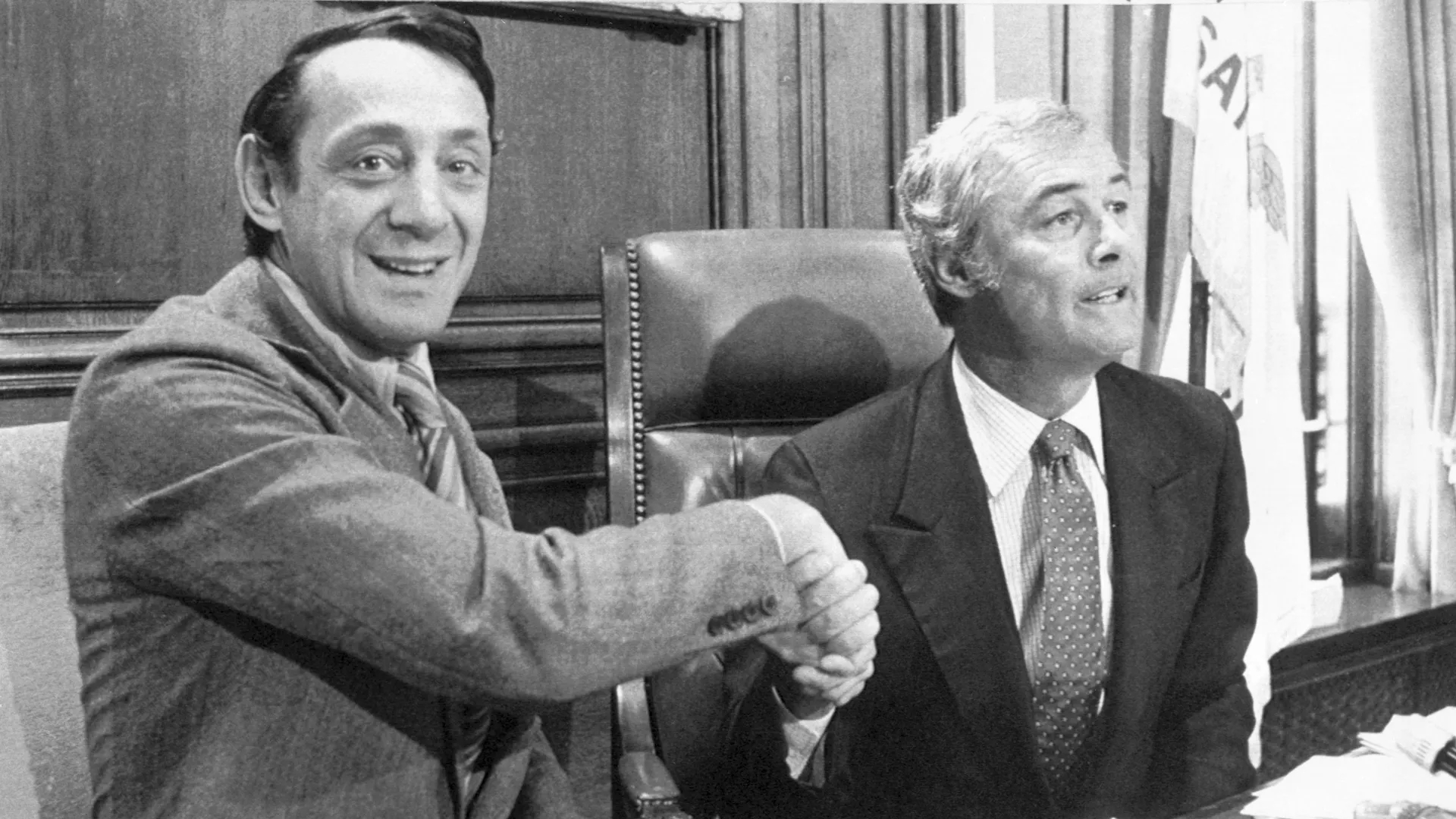
Milk shakes hands with Mayor George Moscone, April 11, 1978

Milk's energy, affinity for pranking, and unpredictability at times exasperated Board of Supervisors President Dianne Feinstein. In his first meeting with Mayor Moscone, Milk called himself the "number one queen" and dictated to Moscone that he would have to go through Milk instead of the Alice B. Toklas Memorial Democratic Club if he wanted the city's gay votes—a quarter of San Francisco's voting population. Milk also became Moscone's closest ally on the Board of Supervisors. The biggest targets of Milk's ire were large corporations and real estate developers. He fumed when a parking garage was slated to take the place of homes near the downtown area, and tried to pass a commuter tax so office workers who lived outside the city and drove into work would have to pay for city services they used. Milk was often willing to vote against Feinstein and other more tenured members of the board. In one controversy early in his term, Milk agreed with fellow Supervisor Dan White, whose district was located two miles south of the Castro, that a mental health facility for troubled adolescents should not be placed there. After Milk learned more about the facility, he decided to switch his vote, ensuring White's loss on the issue—a particularly poignant cause that White championed while campaigning. White did not forget it. He opposed every initiative and issue Milk supported.

Milk began his tenure by sponsoring a civil rights bill that outlawed discrimination based on sexual orientation. The ordinance was called the "most stringent and encompassing in the nation", and its passing demonstrated "the growing political power of homosexuals", according to The New York Times. Only Supervisor White voted against it; Mayor Moscone enthusiastically signed it into law with a light blue pen that Milk had given him for the occasion.

Another bill Milk concentrated on was designed to solve the number one problem according to a recent citywide poll: dog excrement. Within a month of being sworn in, he began to work on a city ordinance to require dog owners to scoop their pets' feces. Dubbed the "pooper scooper law", its authorization by the Board of Supervisors was covered extensively by television and newspapers in San Francisco. Anne Kronenberg, Milk's campaign manager, called him "a master at figuring out what would get him covered in the newspaper". He invited the press to Duboce Park to explain why it was necessary, and while cameras were rolling, stepped in the offending substance, seemingly by mistake. His staffers knew he had been at the park for an hour before the press conference looking for the right place to walk in front of the cameras. It earned him the most fan mail of his tenure in politics and went out on national news releases.

Milk had grown tired of Lira's drinking and considered breaking up with him when Lira called a few weeks later and demanded Milk come home. When Milk arrived, he found Lira had hanged himself. Already prone to severe depression, Lira had attempted suicide previously. One of the notes he left for Milk indicated he was upset about the Anita Bryant and John Briggs campaigns.

=== Briggs Initiative ===
John Briggs was forced to drop out of the 1978 race for California governor, but received enthusiastic support for Proposition 6, dubbed the "Briggs Initiative". The proposed law would have made firing gay teachers—and any public school employees who supported gay rights—mandatory. Briggs' messages supporting Proposition 6 were pervasive throughout California, and Harvey Milk attended every event Briggs hosted. Milk campaigned against the bill throughout the state as well, and swore that if Briggs won California, he would still not win San Francisco. In their numerous debates, which toward the end had been honed to quick back-and-forth banter, Briggs maintained that homosexual teachers wanted to abuse and recruit children. Milk responded with statistics compiled by law enforcement that provided evidence that pedophiles identified primarily as heterosexual, and dismissed Briggs' assertions with one-liner jokes: "If it were true that children mimicked their teachers, you'd sure have a helluva lot more nuns running around."

Attendance at Gay Pride marches during the summer of 1978 in Los Angeles and San Francisco swelled. An estimated 250,000 to 375,000 attended San Francisco's Gay Freedom Day Parade; newspapers claimed the higher numbers were due to John Briggs. Organizers asked participants to carry signs indicating their hometowns for the cameras, to show how far people came to live in the Castro District. Milk rode in an open car carrying a sign saying, "I'm from Woodmere, N.Y." He gave a version of what became his most famous speech, the "Hope Speech", that The San Francisco Examiner said "ignited the crowd":

On this anniversary of Stonewall, I ask my gay sisters and brothers to make the commitment to fight. For themselves, for their freedom, for their country ... We will not win our rights by staying quietly in our closets ... We are coming out to fight the lies, the myths, the distortions. We are coming out to tell the truths about gays, for I am tired of the conspiracy of silence, so I'm going to talk about it. And I want you to talk about it. You must come out. Come out to your parents, your relatives.

Despite the losses in battles for gay rights across the country that year, he remained optimistic, saying, "Even if gays lose in these initiatives, people are still being educated. Because of Anita Bryant and Dade County, the entire country was educated about homosexuality to a greater extent than ever before. The first step is always hostility, and after that you can sit down and talk about it."

Citing the potential infringements on individual rights, former governor of California Ronald Reagan voiced his opposition to the proposition, as did Governor Jerry Brown and President Jimmy Carter, the latter in an afterthought following a speech he gave in Sacramento. On November 7, 1978, the proposition lost by more than a million votes, astounding gay activists on election night. In San Francisco, 75 percent voted against it.

== Assassination ==
On November 10, 1978 (10 months after he was sworn in), Dan White resigned his position on the San Francisco Board of Supervisors, saying that his annual salary of $9,600 (equivalent to $47,388 in 2025) was not enough to support his family. (Note: Despite White's financial strain, he had recently voted against a pay raise for city supervisors that would have given him a $24,000 annual salary. (Cone, Russ [November 14, 1978]. "Increase in City Supervisors' Pay Is Proposed Again", The San Francisco Examiner, p. 4.) Feinstein pointed him toward commercial developers at Pier 39 near Fisherman's Wharf where he and his wife set up a walk-up restaurant called The Hot Potato. (Weiss, pp. 143–146.) Gentrification in the Castro District was fully apparent in the late 1970s. In Milk's public rants about "bloodsucking" real estate developers, he used his landlord (who was gay) as an example. Not amused, his landlord tripled the rent for the storefront and the apartment above, where Milk lived. (Shilts, pp. 227–228.)) Within days, White requested that his resignation be withdrawn and he be reinstated, and Mayor Moscone initially agreed. However, further consideration—and intervention by other supervisors—convinced Moscone to appoint someone more in line with the growing ethnic diversity of White's district and the liberal leanings of the Board of Supervisors.

On November 18 and 19, news broke of the mass suicide of 900 members of the Peoples Temple. The cult had relocated from San Francisco to Guyana. California Representative Leo Ryan was in Jonestown to check on the remote community, and he was killed by gunfire at an airstrip as he tried to escape the tense situation. White remarked to two aides who were working for his reinstatement, "You see that? One day I'm on the front page and the next I'm swept right off."

Moscone planned to announce White's replacement on November 27, 1978. A half hour before the press conference, White avoided metal detectors by entering City Hall through a basement window and went to Moscone's office, where witnesses heard shouting followed by gunshots. White shot Moscone in the shoulder and chest, then twice in the head. White then quickly walked to his former office, reloading his police-issue revolver with hollow-point bullets along the way, and intercepted Milk, asking him to step inside for a moment. Dianne Feinstein heard gunshots and called police, then found Milk face down on the floor, shot five times, including twice in the head. (Note: Though Feinstein was known to carry a handgun in her purse, she afterwards became a proponent of gun control. In 1993, Feinstein exchanged words with Idaho senator Larry Craig, who suggested during a debate on banning assault weapons that "the gentlelady from California" should be "a little bit more familiar with firearms and their deadly characteristics." She reminded Craig that she indeed had experience with the results of firearms when she put her finger in a bullet hole in Milk's neck while searching for a pulse. (Faye, Fiore [April 24, 1995]. "Rematch on Weapons Ban Takes Shape in Congress Arms: Feinstein prepares to defend the prohibition on assault guns as GOP musters forces to repeal it", The Los Angeles Times, p. 3.)) Soon after, she announced to the press, "Today, San Francisco has experienced a double tragedy of immense proportions. As President of the Board of Supervisors, it is my duty to inform you that both Mayor Moscone and Supervisor Harvey Milk have been shot and killed, and the suspect is Supervisor Dan White." Milk was 48 years old. Moscone was 49.

Within an hour, White called his wife from a nearby diner; she met him at a church and was with him when he turned himself in. Many people left flowers on the steps of City Hall, and that evening 25,000 to 40,000 formed a spontaneous candlelight march from Castro Street to City Hall. The next day, the bodies of Moscone and Milk were brought to the City Hall rotunda where mourners paid their respects. Six thousand mourners attended a service for Mayor Moscone at St. Mary's Cathedral. Two memorials were held for Milk; a small one at Temple Emanu-El and a more boisterous one at the Opera House.

=== "City in agony" ===
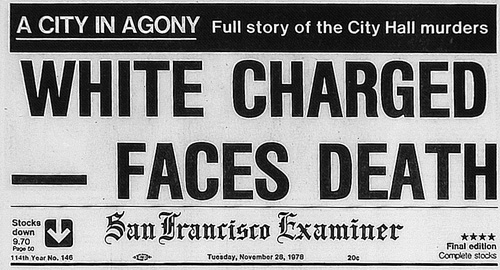
The headline of the San Francisco Examiner on November 28, 1978, announced Dan White was charged with first-degree murder, and eligible for the death penalty.

In the wake of the Jonestown suicides, Moscone had recently increased security at City Hall. Cult survivors recounted drills for suicide preparations that Jones had been called "White Nights". Rumors about the murders of Moscone and Milk were fueled by the coincidence of Dan White's name and Jones's suicide preparations. A stunned District Attorney called the assassinations so close to the news about Jonestown "incomprehensible", but denied any connection. Governor Jerry Brown ordered all flags in California to be flown at half staff, and called Milk a "hard-working and dedicated supervisor, a leader of San Francisco's gay community, who kept his promise to represent all his constituents". President Jimmy Carter expressed his shock at both murders and sent his condolences. Speaker of the California Assembly Leo T. McCarthy called it "an insane tragedy". "A City in Agony" topped the headlines in The San Francisco Examiner the day after the murders; inside the paper stories of the assassinations under the headline "Black Monday" were printed back to back with updates of bodies being shipped home from Guyana. An editorial describing "A city with more sadness and despair in its heart than any city should have to bear" went on to ask how such tragedies could occur, particularly to "men of such warmth and vision and great energies". Dan White was charged with two counts of murder and held without bail, eligible for the death penalty owing to the recent passage of a statewide proposition that allowed death or life in prison for the murder of a public official. One analysis of the months surrounding the murders called 1978 and 1979: "the most emotionally devastating years in San Francisco's fabulously spotted history".

The 32-year-old White, who had been in the Army during the Vietnam War, had run on a tough anti-crime platform in his district. Colleagues declared him a high-achieving "all-American boy". He was to have received an award the next week for rescuing a woman and child from a 17-story burning building when he was a firefighter in 1977. Though he was the only supervisor to vote against Milk's gay rights ordinance earlier that year, he had been quoted as saying, "I respect the rights of all people, including gays". Milk and White at first got along well. One of White's political aides (who was gay) remembered, "Dan had more in common with Harvey than he did with anyone else on the board". White had voted to support a center for gay seniors, and to honor Phyllis Lyon and Del Martin's 25th anniversary and pioneering work.

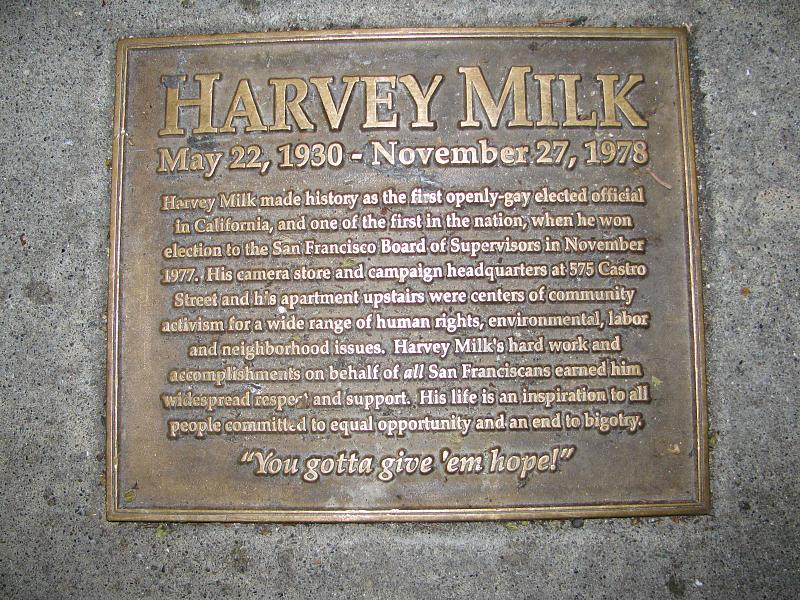
The plaque covering Milk's ashes in front of 575 Castro Street

After Milk's vote for the mental health facility in White's district, however, White refused to speak with Milk and communicated with only one of Milk's aides. Other acquaintances remembered White as very intense. "He was impulsive ... He was an extremely competitive man, obsessively so ... I think he could not take defeat," San Francisco's assistant fire chief told reporters. White's first campaign manager quit in the middle of the campaign, and told a reporter that White was an egotist and it was clear that he was antigay, though he denied it in the press. White's associates and supporters described him "as a man with a pugilistic temper and an impressive capacity for nurturing a grudge". The aide who had handled communications between White and Milk remembered, "Talking to him, I realized that he saw Harvey Milk and George Moscone as representing all that was wrong with the world".

When Milk's friends looked in his closet for a suit for his casket, they learned how much he had been affected by the recent decrease in his income as a supervisor. All of his clothes were coming apart and all of his socks had holes. His remains were cremated and his ashes were split. His closest friends scattered most of the ashes in San Francisco Bay. Other ashes were encapsulated and buried beneath the sidewalk in front of 575 Castro Street, where Castro Camera had been located. There is a memorial to Milk at the Neptune Society Columbarium, ground floor, San Francisco, California. Harry Britt, one of four people Milk listed on his tape as an acceptable replacement should he be assassinated, was chosen to fill that position by the city's acting mayor, Dianne Feinstein.

=== Trial and conviction ===
Dan White's arrest and trial caused a sensation and illustrated severe tensions between the liberal population and the city police. The San Francisco Police were mostly working-class Irish descendants who intensely disliked the growing gay immigration as well as the liberal direction of the city government. After White turned himself in and confessed, he sat in his cell while his former colleagues on the police force told Harvey Milk jokes; police openly wore "Free Dan White" T-shirts in the days after the murder. An undersheriff for San Francisco later stated: "The more I observed what went on at the jail, the more I began to stop seeing what Dan White did as the act of an individual and began to see it as a political act in a political movement." White showed no remorse for his actions, and exhibited vulnerability only during an eight-minute call to his mother from jail.

The jury for White's trial consisted of white middle-class San Franciscans who were mostly Catholic; gays and ethnic minorities were excused from the jury pool. Some of the members of the jury cried when they heard White's tearful recorded confession, at the end of which the interrogator thanked White for his honesty. White's defense attorney, Doug Schmidt, argued that his client was not responsible for his actions; Schmidt used the legal defense known as diminished capacity: "Good people, fine people, with fine backgrounds, simply don't kill people in cold blood." Schmidt tried to prove that White's anguished mental state was a result of manipulation by the politicos in City Hall who had consistently disappointed and confounded him, finally promising to give his job back only to refuse him again. Schmidt said that White's mental deterioration was demonstrated and exacerbated by his junk food binge the night before the murders, since he was usually known to have been health-food conscious. Area newspapers quickly dubbed it the Twinkie defense. White was acquitted of the first-degree murder charge on May 21, 1979, but found guilty of voluntary manslaughter of both victims, and he was sentenced to serve seven and two-thirds years. With the sentence reduced for time served and good behavior, he would be released in five. He cried when he heard the verdict.

=== White Night riots ===
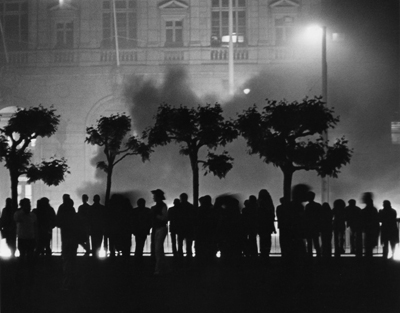
Rioters outside San Francisco City Hall, May 21, 1979, reacting to the voluntary manslaughter verdict for Dan White.

Acting Mayor Feinstein, Supervisor Carol Ruth Silver, and Milk's successor Harry Britt condemned the jury's decision. When the verdict was announced over the police radio, someone sang "Danny Boy" on the police band. A surge of people from the Castro District walked again to City Hall, chanting "Avenge Harvey Milk" and "He got away with murder". Pandemonium rapidly escalated as rocks were hurled at the front doors of the building. Milk's friends and aides tried to stop the destruction, but the mob of more than 3,000 ignored them and lit police cars on fire. They shoved a burning newspaper dispenser through the broken doors of City Hall, then cheered as the flames grew. One of the rioters responded to a reporter's question about why they were destroying parts of the city: "Just tell people that we ate too many Twinkies. That's why this is happening." The chief of police ordered the police not to retaliate, but to hold their ground.

Later that evening, several police cruisers filled with officers wearing riot gear arrived at the Elephant Walk Bar on Castro Street. Harvey Milk's protégé Cleve Jones and a reporter for the San Francisco Chronicle, Warren Hinckle, watched as officers stormed into the bar and began to beat patrons at random. After a 15-minute melee, they left the bar and struck out at people walking along the street.

After the verdict, District Attorney Joseph Freitas faced a furious gay community to explain what had gone wrong. The prosecutor admitted to feeling sorry for White before the trial, and neglected to ask the interrogator who had recorded White's confession (and who was a childhood friend of White's and his police softball team coach) about his biases and the support White received from the police because, he said, he did not want to embarrass the detective in front of his family in court. Nor did Freitas question White's frame of mind or lack of a history of mental illness, or bring into evidence city politics, suggesting that revenge may have been a motive. Supervisor Carol Ruth Silver testified on the last day of the trial that White and Milk were not friendly, yet she had contacted the prosecutor and insisted on testifying. It was the only testimony the jury heard about their strained relationship. Freitas blamed the jury, who he claimed had been "taken in by the whole emotional aspect of [the] trial".

=== Aftermath ===
The murders of Milk and Moscone and White's trial changed city politics and the California legal system. In 1980, San Francisco ended district supervisor elections, fearing that a Board of Supervisors so divisive would be harmful to the city and that they had been a factor in the assassinations. A grassroots neighborhood effort to restore district elections in the mid-1990s proved successful, and the city returned to neighborhood representatives in 2000. As a result of Dan White's trial, California voters changed the law to reduce the likelihood of acquittals of accused who knew what they were doing but claimed their capacity was impaired. Diminished capacity was abolished as a defense to a charge, but courts allowed evidence of it when deciding whether to incarcerate, commit, or otherwise punish a convicted defendant. The "Twinkie defense" has entered American mythology, popularly described as a case where a murderer escapes justice because he binged on junk food, simplifying White's lack of political savvy, his relationships with George Moscone and Harvey Milk, and what San Francisco Chronicle columnist Herb Caen described as his "dislike of homosexuals".

Dan White served just over five years for the double homicide of Moscone and Milk; he was released from prison on January 7, 1984. On October 21, 1985, White was found dead in a running car in his wife's garage, having committed suicide by carbon monoxide poisoning. He was 39 years old. His defense attorney told reporters that he had been despondent over the loss of his family and the situation he had caused, adding, "This was a sick man."

== Legacy ==
Milk's political career centered on making government responsive to individuals, gay liberation, and the importance of neighborhoods to the city. At the onset of each campaign, an issue was added to Milk's public political philosophy. His 1973 campaign focused on the first point, that as a small business owner in San Francisco—a city dominated by large corporations that had been courted by municipal government—his interests were being overlooked because he was not represented by a large financial institution. Although he did not hide the fact that he was gay, it did not become an issue until his race for the California State Assembly in 1976. It was brought to the fore in the supervisor race against Rick Stokes, as it was an extension of his ideas of individual freedom.

Milk strongly believed that neighborhoods promoted unity and a small-town experience, and that the Castro should provide services to all its residents. He opposed the closing of an elementary school; while most gay people in the Castro did not have children, Milk saw his neighborhood having the potential to welcome everyone. He told his aides to concentrate on fixing potholes and boasted that 50 new stop signs had been installed in District 5. Responding to city residents' largest complaint about living in San Francisco—dog feces—Milk made it a priority to enact the ordinance requiring dog owners to take care of their pets' droppings. Randy Shilts noted, "some would claim Harvey was a socialist or various other sorts of ideologues, but, in reality, Harvey's political philosophy was never more complicated than the issue of dogshit; government should solve people's basic problems."

Karen Foss, a communications professor at the University of New Mexico, attributes Milk's impact on San Francisco politics to the fact that he was unlike anyone else who had held public office in the city. She writes, "Milk happened to be a highly energetic, charismatic figure with a love of theatrics and nothing to lose ... Using laughter, reversal, transcendence, and his insider/outsider status, Milk helped create a climate in which dialogue on issues became possible. He also provided a means to integrate the disparate voices of his various constituencies." Milk had been a rousing speaker since he began campaigning in 1973, and his oratory skills only improved after he became City Supervisor. His most famous talking points became known as the "Hope Speech", which became a staple throughout his political career. It opened with a play on the accusation that gay people recruit impressionable youth into their numbers: "My name is Harvey Milk—and I want to recruit you." A version of the Hope Speech that he gave near the end of his life was considered by his friends and aides to be the best, and the closing the most effective:

And the young gay people in the Altoona, Pennsylvanias and the Richmond, Minnesotas who are coming out and hear Anita Bryant in television and her story. The only thing they have to look forward to is hope. And you have to give them hope. Hope for a better world, hope for a better tomorrow, hope for a better place to come to if the pressures at home are too great. Hope that all will be all right. Without hope, not only gays, but the blacks, the seniors, the handicapped, the us'es, the us'es will give up. And if you help elect to the central committee and other offices, more gay people, that gives a green light to all who feel disenfranchised, a green light to move forward. It means hope to a nation that has given up, because if a gay person makes it, the doors are open to everyone.

In the last year of his life, Milk emphasized that gay people should be more visible to help to end the discrimination and violence against them. Although Milk had not come out to his mother before her death many years before, in his final statement during his taped prediction of his assassination, he urged others to do so:

I cannot prevent anyone from getting angry, or mad, or frustrated. I can only hope that they'll turn that anger and frustration and madness into something positive, so that two, three, four, five hundred will step forward, so the gay doctors will come out, the gay lawyers, the gay judges, gay bankers, gay architects ... I hope that every professional gay will say 'enough', come forward and tell everybody, wear a sign, let the world know. Maybe that will help.

However, Milk's assassination has become entwined with his political efficacy, partly because he was killed at the zenith of his popularity. Historian Neil Miller writes, "No contemporary American gay leader has yet to achieve in life the stature Milk found in death." His legacy has become ambiguous; Randy Shilts concludes his biography writing that Milk's success, murder, and the inevitable injustice of White's verdict represented the experience of all gays. Milk's life was "a metaphor for the homosexual experience in America". According to Frances FitzGerald, Milk's legend has been unable to be sustained as no one appeared able to take his place in the years after his death: "The Castro saw him as a martyr but understood his martyrdom as an end rather than a beginning. He had died, and with him a great deal of the Castro's optimism, idealism, and ambition seemed to die as well. The Castro could find no one to take his place in its affections, and possibly wanted no one." On the 20th anniversary of Milk's death, historian John D'Emilio said, "The legacy that I think he would want to be remembered for is the imperative to live one's life at all times with integrity." For a political career so short, Cleve Jones attributes more to his assassination than his life: "His murder and the response to it made permanent and unquestionable the full participation of gay and lesbian people in the political process."

=== Tributes and media ===
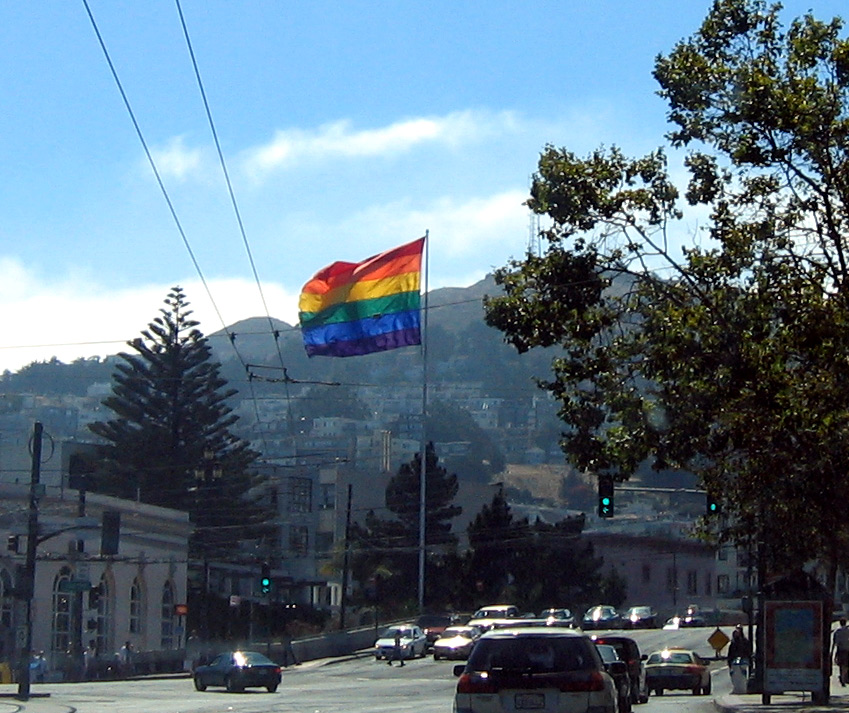
Gay Pride flag above Harvey Milk Plaza in The Castro neighborhood

The City of San Francisco has paid tribute to Milk by naming several locations after him. (Note: The Harvey Milk Recreational Arts Center is headquarters for the drama and performing arts programs for the city's youth. (Duboce Park and Harvey Milk Recreational Arts Center, San Francisco Neighborhood Parks Council, 2008. Retrieved on September 7, 2008.) Douglass Elementary in the Castro District was renamed the Harvey Milk Civil Rights Academy in 1996 (Harvey Milk Civil Rights Academy: Our History, Harvey Milk Civil Rights Academy website. Retrieved September 8, 2008.) and the Eureka Valley Branch of the San Francisco Public Library was also renamed in his honor in 1981. It is located at 1 José Sarria Court, named for the first openly gay man to run for public office in the United States. (Eureka Valley Library History, San Francisco Public Library website. Retrieved February 21, 2020.) On what would have been Milk's 78th birthday, a bust of his likeness was unveiled in San Francisco City Hall at the top of the grand staircase on May 22, 2008. On June 2, 2008, the bust was accepted into the city's Civic Art Collection during a meeting of the San Francisco Arts Commission. It was designed by the Eugene Daub, Firmin, Hendrickson Sculpture Group with Eugene Daub the principal sculptor. Engraved in the pedestal is a quotation from one of the audiotapes Milk recorded in the event of his assassination, which he openly predicted several times before his death. "I ask for the movement to continue because my election gave young people out there hope. You gotta give 'em hope." (Buchanan, Wyatt (May 22, 2008). "S.F. prepares to unveil bust of Harvey Milk", San Francisco Chronicle. Retrieved on September 8, 2008.) On the 82nd anniversary of his birth, a street was renamed to Harvey Milk Street in San Diego, and a new park named Harvey Milk Promenade Park was opened in Long Beach, California. (Harvey Milk Honored With San Diego Street, Long Beach Park On His 82nd Birthday, The Huffington Post. Published May 22, 2012. Retrieved May 23, 2012.)) Where Market and Castro streets intersect in San Francisco flies an enormous Gay Pride flag, situated in Harvey Milk Plaza. The San Francisco Gay Democratic Club changed its name to the Harvey Milk Memorial Gay Democratic Club in 1978 (it is currently named the Harvey Milk LGBTQ Democratic Club) and boasts that it is the largest Democratic organization in San Francisco.

In April 2018, the San Francisco Board of Supervisors and mayor Mark Farrell approved and signed legislation renaming Terminal 1 at San Francisco International Airport after Milk, and planned to install artwork memorializing him. This followed a previous attempt to rename the entire airport after him, which was turned down. Officially opening on July 23, 2019, Harvey Milk Terminal 1 is the world's first airport terminal named after a leader of the LGBTQ community.

In New York City, Harvey Milk High School is a school program for at-risk youth that concentrates on the needs of gay, lesbian, bisexual, and transgender students and operates out of the Hetrick-Martin Institute.

In July 2016, U.S. Secretary of the Navy Ray Mabus advised Congress that he intended to name the second ship of the Military Sealift Command's John Lewis-class oilers USNS Harvey Milk (T-AO-206) (June 2025 renamed, USNS Oscar V. Peterson (T-AO-206) after, Oscar V. Peterson). Milk served in the U.S. Navy during the Korean War aboard the submarine rescue ship USS Kittiwake (ASR-13) and held the rank of lieutenant (junior grade) at the time that he was forced to accept an "other than honorable" discharge rather than face a court martial for his homosexuality. The ship was officially named at a ceremony in San Francisco on August 16, 2016, generating some controversy considering Milk's antiwar stance later in his life. In November 2021, the ship was launched. However, in June 2025, US Defense Secretary Pete Hegseth ordered that Milk's name be removed from the ship. A defense official indicated that the announcement was intentionally timed to take place during Pride Month. The vessel was renamed USNS Oscar V. Peterson for a Medal of Honor recipient.

In response to a grassroots effort, in June 2018 the city council of Portland, Oregon, voted to rename a thirteen-block southwestern section of Stark Street to Harvey Milk Street. The mayor, Ted Wheeler, declared that it "sends a signal that we are an open and a welcoming and an inclusive community".

In 1982, freelance reporter Randy Shilts completed his first book: a biography of Milk, titled The Mayor of Castro Street. Shilts wrote the book while unable to find a steady job as an openly gay reporter. The Times of Harvey Milk, a documentary film based on the book's material, won the 1984 Academy Award for Documentary Feature. Director Rob Epstein spoke later about why he chose the subject of Milk's life: "At the time, for those of us who lived in San Francisco, it felt like it was life changing, that all the eyes of the world were upon us, but in fact most of the world outside of San Francisco had no idea. It was just a really brief, provincial, localized current events story that the mayor and a city council member in San Francisco were killed. It didn't have much reverberation." Milk was also the subject of Helene Meyers work, "Got Jewish Milk: Screening Epstein and Van Sant for Intersectional Film History", which explored the contemporary depiction of Milk and his "Jewishness".

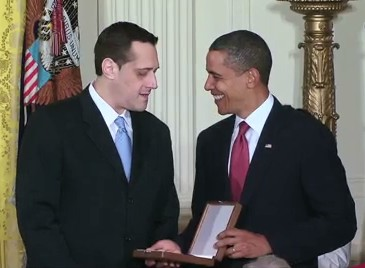
Stuart Milk accepts the Presidential Medal of Freedom from President Barack Obama in August 2009 on behalf of his uncle

Milk's life has been the subject of a musical theater production; an eponymous opera; a cantata; a children's picture book; a French-language historical novel for young-adult readers; and the biopic Milk, released in 2008 after 15 years in the making. The film was directed by Gus Van Sant and starred Sean Penn as Milk and Josh Brolin as Dan White, and won two Academy Awards for Best Original Screenplay and Best Actor. It took eight weeks to film, and often used extras who had been present at the actual events for large crowd scenes, including a scene depicting Milk's "Hope Speech" at the 1978 Gay Freedom Day Parade.

Milk was included in the "Time 100 Heroes and Icons of the 20th Century" as "a symbol of what gays can accomplish and the dangers they face in doing so". Despite his antics and publicity stunts, according to writer John Cloud, "none understood how his public role could affect private lives better than Milk ... [he] knew that the root cause of the gay predicament was invisibility". The Advocate listed Milk third in their "40 Heroes" of the 20th century issue, quoting Dianne Feinstein: "His homosexuality gave him an insight into the scars which all oppressed people wear. He believed that no sacrifice was too great a price to pay for the cause of human rights."

In August 2009, President Barack Obama posthumously awarded Milk the Presidential Medal of Freedom for his contribution to the gay rights movement stating "he fought discrimination with visionary courage and conviction". Milk's nephew Stuart accepted for his uncle. Shortly after, Stuart co-founded the Harvey Milk Foundation with Anne Kronenberg with the support of Desmond Tutu, co-recipient of 2009 Presidential Medal of Freedom and was a member of the Foundation's advisory board. Later in the year, California governor Arnold Schwarzenegger designated May 22 as Harvey Milk Day and inducted Milk in the California Hall of Fame.

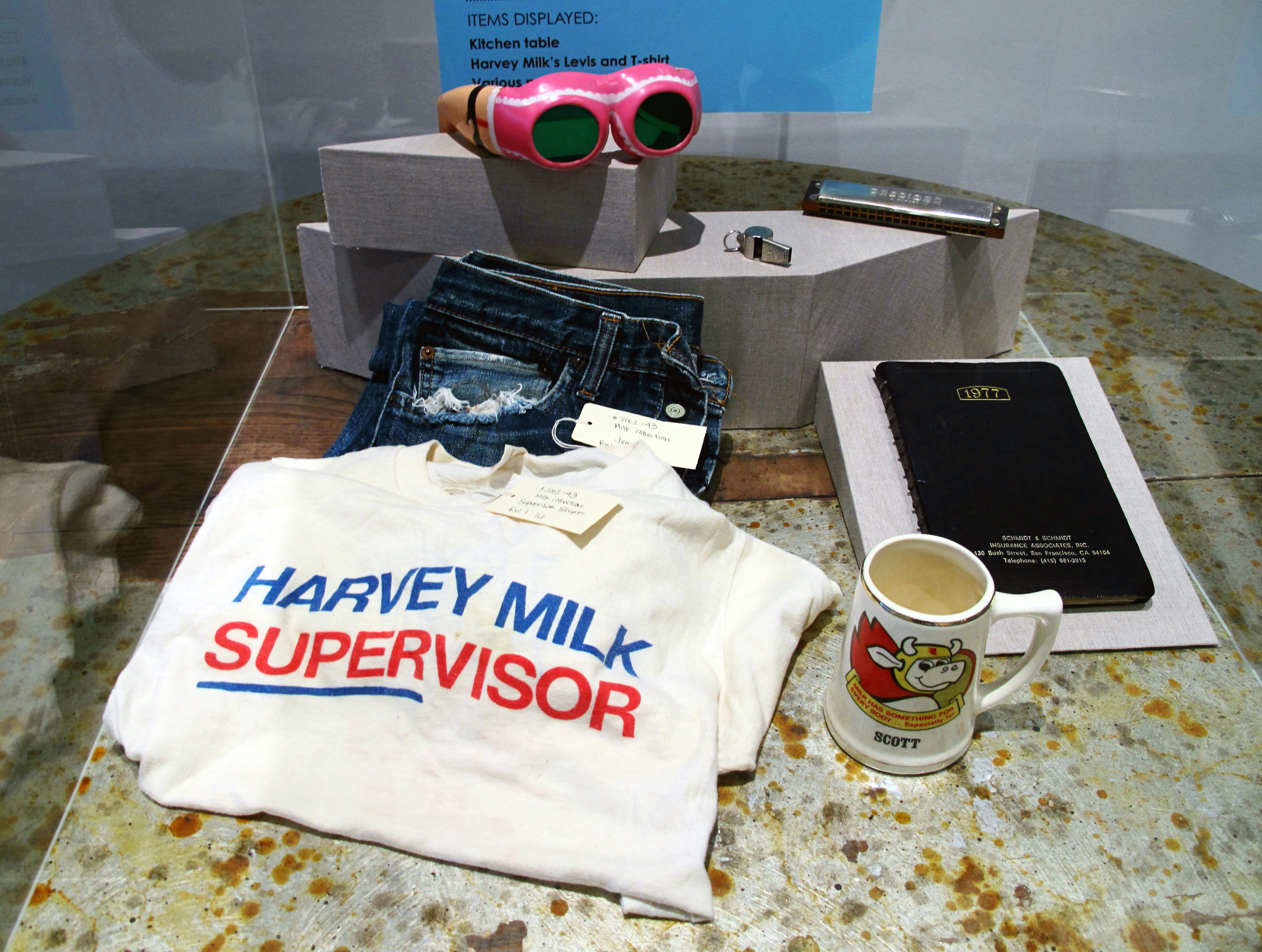
Personal belongings of Harvey Milk on display at the GLBT History Museum in San Francisco's Castro District

Since 2003, the story of Harvey Milk has been featured in three exhibitions created by the GLBT Historical Society, a San Francisco–based museum, archives, and research center, to which the estate of Scott Smith donated Milk's personal belongings that were preserved after his death. On May 22, 2014, the United States Postal Service issued a postage stamp honoring Harvey Milk, the first openly LGBTQ political official to receive this honor. The stamp features a photo taken in front of Milk's Castro Camera store and was unveiled on what would have been his 84th birthday.

Harry Britt summarized Milk's impact the evening Milk was shot in 1978: "No matter what the world has taught us about ourselves, we can be beautiful and we can get our thing together ... Harvey was a prophet ... he lived by a vision ... Something very special is going to happen in this city and it will have Harvey Milk's name on it."

In 2010, radio producer JD Doyle aired the two-hour Harvey Milk Music on his Queer Music Heritage radio program. The mission of the broadcast was to gather music about and inspired by the Harvey Milk story. That broadcast and playlist of songs is archived online.

Milk was inducted in 2012 into the Legacy Walk, an outdoor public display in Chicago which celebrates LGBTQ history and people. He was named one of the inaugural fifty American "pioneers, trailblazers, and heroes" inducted on the National LGBTQ Wall of Honor within the Stonewall National Monument (SNM) in New York City's Stonewall Inn. Paris named a square Place Harvey-Milk in Le Marais in 2019.

==== Relationship with Judaism In Adulthood ====
Harvey did not consider himself a very religious man in his adulthood. He once described himself as not being "theologically oriented". However, his Jewish upbringing in Woodemere Long Island, New York, affected his values throughout his life. Milk identified himself as, "A jew from New York." In speeches, he would frequently use the Holocaust as a metaphor for what could happen. Being Jewish affected his moral agenda. For Milk, Jews could not allow for the discrimination of other groups since Jews could always be persecuted next, "Jews know they can't allow other groups to suffer discrimination if for no other reason than we might be on the list someday". Being Jewish was something that continued to be part of his worldview. Harvey learned about the idea of Tikkun Olam from Judaism. This is a fundamental idea in the faith, focusing on the goal of repairing the world. During his life, he was known to prepare Jewish foods for breakfast to serve to his partners, as well as make jokes in his grandfather's Yiddish accent. "When in the company of his Jewish friends, Harvey relished the talk of Yiddishkayt". At the end of his life, Milk had a funeral at the San Francisco War Memorial Opera House and a lesser-known, more intimate funeral beforehand at the Temple Emanu-El, also in San Francisco.

== See also ==
- LGBTQ culture in San Francisco
- LGBTQ movements
- List of assassinated American politicians
- List of civil rights leaders
- Kathy Kozachenko

== Bibliography ==
- Carter, David (2004). Stonewall: The Riots that Sparked the Gay Revolution, St. Martin's Press. ISBN 0312342691. OCLC 865096291
- Clendinen, Dudley, and Nagourney, Adam (1999). Out for Good: The Struggle to Build a Gay Rights Movement in America, Simon & Schuster. ISBN 0684810913. OCLC 946579946
- de Jim, Strange (2003). San Francisco's Castro, Arcadia Publishing. ISBN 978-0738528663. OCLC 1176178319
- Duberman, Martin (1999). Left Out: the Politics of Exclusion: Essays, 1964–1999, Basic Books. ISBN 0465017444. OCLC 51871732
- Harvey Milk: Messenger of Hope (2020). SFO Museum.
- Hinckle, Warren (1985). Gayslayer! The Story of How Dan White Killed Harvey Milk and George Moscone & Got Away With Murder, Silver Dollar Books. ISBN 0933839014. OCLC 652202654
- Leyland, Winston, ed (2002). Out In the Castro: Desire, Promise, Activism, Leyland Publications. ISBN 978-0943595870. OCLC 682374266
- Marcus, Eric (2002). Making Gay History, HarperCollins Publishers. ISBN 0060933917. OCLC 173503711
- Miller, Neil (1994) Out of the Past: Gay and Lesbian History from 1869 to the Present, Vintage Books. ISBN 0679749888. OCLC 654712107
- Shilts, Randy (1982). The Mayor of Castro Street: The Life and Times of Harvey Milk, St. Martin's Press. ISBN 0312523300. OCLC 1285784510
- Smith, Raymond, Haider-Markel, Donald, eds., (2002). Gay and Lesbian Americans and Political Participation, ABC-CLIO. ISBN 1576072568. OCLC 1056097931
- Weiss, Mike (2010). Double Play: The Hidden Passions Behind the Double Assassination of George Moscone and Harvey Milk, Vince Emery Productions. ISBN 978-0982565056. OCLC 655662629

Political offices
New constituency	Member of the San Francisco Board of Supervisors from the 5th district 1978	Succeeded by Harry Britt
