= Harvey Milk Foundation =

LGBTQ rights foundation

- Founded: 2009
- Founder: Stuart Milk & Anne Kronenberg
- Purpose: LGBTQ
- Location: United States
- Region served: Global
- Method: Public Education, Coalition Building, Scholarships, Public Events
- Key people: Desmond Tutu, Stuart Milk, Anne Kronenberg, Nancy Brinker, Bruce Cohen
- Website: MilkFoundation.org

The Harvey Milk Foundation was founded in 2009 by Harvey Milk's nephew, Stuart Milk, and Harvey's campaign manager and political aide, Anne Kronenberg, based on discussions held with the family and close Harvey Milk allies after Stuart received the Presidential Medal of Freedom earlier that year. The organization continues to be headed by Stuart Milk and Anne Kronenberg and operates on a small, mostly private donor based, budget.

The Foundation's activities focus around encouraging local, regional, national and global organizations to learn and utilize Harvey Milk's story, style, and coalition building technique; supporting LGBTQ youth; and promoting education that includes Harvey's story and the LGBT community's collective story.

== Harvey Milk Day ==
Harvey Milk Day is organized by the Harvey Milk Foundation and celebrated globally each year on Milk's birthday, May 22.

In California, Harvey Milk Day is recognized as a day of special significance for public schools. The day was established by Governor Arnold Schwarzenegger in 2009, following the success of the award-winning feature film Milk retracing Milk's life.

== Promoting Harvey Milk's Legacy ==
=== Harvey Milk stamp ===
An effort campaigning the US Postal Service to issue a stamp honoring Harvey Milk is supported by the Foundation and led by Michael Gaffney and Nicole Murray-Ramirez. The campaign has also received assistance from the National Gay and Lesbian Task Force and community leaders such as David Mixner, John Pérez, and Reverend Troy Perry.

=== Harvey Milk International Airport ===
The Foundation supported efforts by San Francisco Supervisor David Campos in early 2013 to rename San Francisco International Airport in honor of Harvey Milk. At the time, about 80 other U.S. airports were named after individuals, none of whom were gay.

Campos introduced a proposal on January 15, 2013, to put a ballot initiative renaming the airport "Harvey Milk San Francisco International Airport" before voters in November 2013. To send the name change to voters, Campos needed the support of five other supervisors. Supervisor Scott Wiener, who represents the same area that Milk did, was a co-sponsor of the proposal.

The change would cost between $50,000 and $250,000 to implement, and there are plans to solicit private donations to cover the costs.

The proposal has been met with resistance by some community leaders and members of the LGBT media, leaving it without public support from the sixth supervisor necessary to put the proposal on the ballot. Supporters, including the Foundation, have held events and online actions to generate additional public support.

== International LGBT advocacy ==
In 2012, the Foundation brought transgender leaders from five continents together for a panel at a global summit in Milan, Italy. The Foundation helped support the first LGBT pride parade through Taksim Square in Istanbul in 2008. During the parade, Turkish police aimed water cannons and assault rifles on the crowd.
