= Helene Meyers =

American writer and professor

Helene Myers
- Education: Pennsylvania State University (BA); University of Florida (MA); Indiana University Bloomington (PhD)
- Writing career
- Genre: non-fiction
- Subjects: Feminism, anti-Semitism

Helene Meyers is an American writer, author, and professor. Her work is focused on the intersections of literary and film studies, feminist and queer studies, and Jewish studies.

== Biography ==
Helene Meyers was born in Brooklyn, New York. She received her education at Pennsylvania State University (B.A.), University of Florida (M.A.), and Indiana University Bloomington (Ph.D.).

Meyers often tacklles feminist, antisemitism, and queer themes as well as literary and film studies. In her book, Movie-Made Jews, she explored the onscreen depictions of antisemitism, assimilation, the Holocaust, queer Jews, intersectional alliances, and feminism. She also argued that movies are important because they help in forming "our images of ourselves, others, and the world." Her works had been published in Lilith, Forward, Tablet, Ms. Magazine’s Blog, the Washington Independent Review of Books, the Chronicle of Higher Education, and Inside Higher Education. Her feminist publications included an analogy of gender discrimination to a component of a Gothic world where women are continuously at risk as they roam the streets, make love in their bedrooms, enter their gynecologists' office, or when they consume and produce culture.

She serves as Professor of English and McManis University Chair at Southwestern University. She is Jewish, and a native New Yorker.

== Bibliography ==
- Movie-Made Jews: An American Tradition. Rutgers University Press.
- Identity Papers: Contemporary Narratives of American Jewishness. SUNY Press, 2011.
- Reading Michael Chabon. Greenwood Press, 2010.
- Femicidal Fears: Narratives of the Female Gothic Experience.

== Honors and awards ==
- McManis University Chair, 2009
- Brown Senior Faculty Fellowship. 2004-2005
- Fellow of the Summer Institute on the Holocaust and Jewish Civilization. Northwestern University. Summer 2000
- Southwestern University Distinguished Teaching Award. Spring 2000
- Southwestern University Award for Fostering Diversity. Spring 2002
- Brown Faculty Fellowship. Southwestern University. 1994-95
- Cullen Faculty Development Grants. Southwestern University. 1992-2009
- Graduate Council Fellowship. University of Florida. 1983
- University Scholar, Pennsylvania State University. 1982
- Phi Beta Kappa, Pennsylvania State University. 1982
