= Harvey Milk Day =

Annual gay rights holiday

- Harvey Milk Day logo
- Observed by: West Hollywood, California; Signal Hill, California; California, United States; Wilton Manors, Florida
- Date: May 22
- Next time: May 22, 2027
- Frequency: Annual
- Related to: Harvey Milk and Harvey Milk Foundation

Harvey Milk Day is organized by the Harvey Milk Foundation and celebrated each year on May 22, especially in California, in memory of Harvey Milk, a gay rights activist who was assassinated in 1978. Milk was a prominent gay activist during the 20th century. He ran for office three times before becoming the first openly gay person elected to California public office, where he served as a San Francisco city supervisor. Harvey Milk Day came about as a day to remember and teach about Milk's life and his work to stop discrimination against the LGBTQIA+ community.

== California Day of Special Significance ==
In California, Harvey Milk Day is recognized by the state's government as a day of special significance for public schools. The day was established by the California legislature and signed into law by Governor Arnold Schwarzenegger in 2009. Having vetoed the legislation in 2008, Gov. Schwarzenegger was persuaded to reverse his position after a series of petitions led by gay rights activist Daren I. Ball, President Barack Obama's decision to award Milk the Presidential Medal of Freedom, and the release of the award-winning feature film Milk retracing Milk's life.

=== Legislative history ===
Session	Short title	Bill number	Date introduced	Assembly	Senate	Governor	Status	Lead Author	Co-Authors	Sponsor	References
2007-2008	Harvey Milk Day	AB 2567	February 22, 2008	Passed the Assembly 45-23	Passed in the Senate 22-13	Vetoed by Governor Arnold Schwarzenegger on September 30, 2008	Died	Assembly Member Mark Leno	Senators Christine Kehoe, Sheila Kuehl, and Carole Migden; Assembly Member John Laird; Speaker Fabian Núñez	Equality California (EQCA)	
2009-2010	Harvey Milk Day	SB 572	February 27, 2009	Passed the Assembly 45-27	Passed in the Senate 25-12	Signed into Law by Governor Arnold Schwarzenegger on October 11, 2009	Passed	Senator Mark Leno	Senator Christine Kehoe; Assembly Members Tom Ammiano and John A. Pérez	Equality California (EQCA)	

== See also ==
- Public holidays in the United States
