= The Times of Harvey Milk =

- Film poster
- Directed by: Rob Epstein
- Written by: Rob Epstein; Carter Wilson; Judith Coburn
- Produced by: Richard Schmiechen; Rob Epstein
- Starring: Harvey Fierstein; Harvey Milk; Anne Kronenberg
- Narrated by: Harvey Fierstein
- Cinematography: Frances Reid
- Edited by: Rob Epstein; Deborah Hoffmann
- Music by: Mark Isham
- Distributed by: TC Films International; Cinecom
- Release date: October 26, 1984
- Running time: 90 minutes
- Country: United States
- Language: English
- Box office: $29,802

The Times of Harvey Milk is a 1984 American documentary film that premiered at the Telluride Film Festival, the New York Film Festival, and then on November 1, 1984, at the Castro Theatre in San Francisco. The film was directed by Rob Epstein, produced by Richard Schmiechen, and narrated by Harvey Fierstein, with an original score by Mark Isham.

In 2012, this film was deemed "culturally, historically, or aesthetically significant" by the United States Library of Congress and selected for preservation in the National Film Registry.

== Premise ==
The Times of Harvey Milk documents the political career of Harvey Milk, who was San Francisco's first openly gay supervisor. The film documents Milk's rise from a neighborhood activist to a symbol of gay political achievement, through to his assassination in November 1978 at San Francisco's city hall, and the Dan White trial and aftermath.

== Participants ==
Narrator

- Harvey Fierstein

Interview subjects

- Anne Kronenberg (city hall aide to Harvey Milk)
- Tory Hartmann (political consultant)
- Tom Ammiano (schoolteacher)
- Jim Elliot (auto machinist)
- Henry Der (executive director, Chinese for Affirmative Action)
- Jeannine Yeomans (TV reporter)
- Bill Kraus (gay activist)
- Sally M. Gearhart (speech professor)

Archive footage

- Dianne Feinstein
- Harvey Milk
- George Moscone
- Dan White
- John Briggs
- Jimmy Carter

== Featured individuals ==
The film was produced after Milk's death using original interviews, exclusive documentary footage, news reports, and archival footage, so that Milk is credited as the lead (posthumously). Other politicians including San Francisco mayor George Moscone (who was assassinated with Milk), and Moscone's successor and later United States Senator Dianne Feinstein appear in archival footage. The film opens with a tearful Feinstein delivering her announcement to the media that Moscone and Milk had been assassinated by Dan White.

Also featured in the film is schoolteacher Tom Ammiano, who would go on to be a member of the California State Assembly.

== Reception ==
On the review aggregator website Rotten Tomatoes, 96% of 28 critics' reviews are positive. The website's consensus reads: "True to its title, The Times of Harvey Milk looks back on the life of the titular politician and activist -- and the era he helped define with his trailblazing career."

== Accolades ==
The film won the Academy Award for Best Documentary Feature in 1985, and was awarded the Special Jury Prize at the first Sundance Film Festival, among other awards.

== Home media ==
A digitally restored version of the film was released on DVD and Blu-ray by The Criterion Collection in March 2011. The release includes an audio commentary featuring director Rob Epstein, co-editor Deborah Hoffmann, and photographer Daniel Nicoletta; a few interview clips and news clips not used in the film; a new interview with documentary filmmaker Jon Else; a new program about The Times of Harvey Milk and Gus Van Sant's 2008 film Milk, featuring Epstein, Van Sant, actor James Franco, and Milk's friends Cleve Jones, Anne Kronenberg, and Nicoletta; a rare collection of audio and video recordings of Milk; excerpts from Epstein's preproduction research tapes of interviews he conducted with a number of people who were ultimately not interviewed for the final film, including Milk's partner Scott Smith; footage from the film's Castro Theatre premiere and the 1984 Academy Awards; a panel discussion from 2003 with Dan White's attorneys; and excerpts from the 25th anniversary commemoration of Milk's and Mayor George Moscone's assassinations.
