= Timeline of Asian and Pacific Islander diasporic LGBTQ history =

This is a timeline of notable events in the history of non-heterosexual conforming people of Asian and Pacific Islander ancestry, who may identify as LGBTIQGNC (lesbian, gay, bisexual, transgender, intersex, queer, third gender, gender nonconforming), men who have sex with men, or related culturally-specific identities. This timeline includes events both in Asia and the Pacific Islands and in the global Asian and Pacific Islander diaspora, as the histories are very deeply linked. Please note: this is a very incomplete timeline, notably lacking LGBTQ-specific items from the 1800s to 1970s, and should not be used as a research resource until additional material is added.

== 200s BCE ==
- Nearly every emperor in the Han dynasty had one or more male sex partners.

== 200s ==
- Writings from the Liu Song dynasty claimed that homosexuality was as common as heterosexuality.

== 1800s ==
- Opposition to homosexuality did not become firmly established in China until the 19th and 20th centuries, through the Westernization efforts of the late Qing dynasty and early Republic of China.

=== 1871 ===
- Anti-Chinese riots break out in Los Angeles and other cities. A mob of whites shoot and hang 20 Chinese one night

=== 1882 ===
- The Chinese Exclusion Act prohibits entrance of Chinese laborers to the United States, and prohibits courts from issuing citizenship. The Exclusion Act was intended to last for only 10 years, but was later extended to 1902 and became permanent until it was repealed in 1943. The Chinese become the first ethnic group to be barred from immigration to the United States.

=== 1891 ===
- In Hawaii, Japanese immigrant worker Mioshi takes his case to the state's Supreme Court, arguing that the contract labor system is a form of slavery.

== 1900s ==
=== 1901 ===
- California's anti-miscegenation law is amended to bar marriages between whites and “Mongolians,” which means people of Asian heritage. This law remains in effect until 1948.

=== 1904 ===
- Congress amends the 1882 anti-Chinese immigration law to exclude immigrants from the Philippines, Guam, Samoa, and even Hawai’i.

=== 1906 ===
- In San Francisco, the Board of Education passes a resolution to segregate Chinese, Japanese, and Korean children from the rest. Their decision escalates into an international crisis.

=== 1907 ===
- Executive Order 589, commonly referred to as the “Gentlemen’s Agreement,” becomes law. The Japanese government agrees to stop issuing passports for laborers emigrating to the American mainland, but through this agreement, allows departure for Hawai’i.

== 1910s ==
=== 1914 ===
- In Los Angeles, Little Tokyo community leaders establish the society to provide counseling and referral services to young girls fleeing unsuccessful picture bride marriages or seeking refuge from houses of prostitution.

=== 1917 ===
- President Woodrow Wilson vetoes a bill passed by Congress on December 14, 1916, but Congress overrides his veto.The Asiatic Barred Zone Act establishes a zone of countries that excluded immigrants from most of Asia, the Pacific Islands, as well as parts of Russia, the Middle East, and Afghanistan.

== 1920s ==
=== 1922 ===
- Congress passes the Cable Act, which revokes the U.S. citizenship of any woman citizen marrying an alien ineligible for U.S. citizenship. The law is predominantly aimed at American-born Asian women marrying immigrant Asian men.

=== 1923 ===
- Citing anthropologists who declare Indians “biologically Caucasian,” Bhagat Singh Thind applies for naturalization, but the U.S. vs. Bhagat Singh Thind decision officially bars Asian Indians as well as other Asians from citizenship.

=== 1924 ===
- President Calvin Coolidge signs into law the Immigration Act of 1924, also known as the Quota Immigration or National Origins Act. It excludes the immigration of all Asian laborers, except from the Philippines, which was by then a U.S. territory.

== 1930s ==
=== 1934 ===
- President Franklin D. Roosevelt signs the Tydings-McDuffie Act, which prohibits Filipino immigration. The Act declares the Philippines a commonwealth, and all foreign-born Filipinos are now aliens, not nationals.Their immigration is restricted to 50 a year, and this results in the long-term separation of many families.

== 1940s ==
=== 1942 ===
- President Roosevelt signs Executive Order 9066 authorizing the Secretary of War to establish military areas and to exclude civilians from these areas. This action is responsible for removing and imprisoning 120,000 persons of Japanese ancestry from the West Coast into 10 internment camps. Ironically, the 442nd Regimental Combat Team, predominantly made up of second-generation Japanese Americans and led by a Korean American, Colonel Young Oak Kim, becomes the most decorated military unit for its size and length of service in U.S. history.

=== 1946 ===
- The last of the Japanese American internment camps, Tule Lake, closes.

== 1950s ==
=== 1952 ===
- The McCarran-Walter Immigration and Nationality Act goes into effect, repealing the National Origins Act of 1924 and allowing immigration quotas to Japan and other Asian countries. This Act gives the rights of naturalization and eventual citizenship for Asians not born in the United States and sets a quota of 105 immigrants per year for each Asian country.

=== 1956 ===
- South Asian American Dalip Singh Saund becomes the first Asian American to be elected to the U.S. Congress; during his term, he forged a measure through Congress that allowed Indians to become U.S. citizens.

=== 1958 ===
- In the landmark case One, Inc. v. Olesen, the United States Supreme Court rules in favor of the First Amendment rights of the lesbian, gay, bisexual and transgender (LGBT) magazine "One: The Homosexual Magazine." The suit was filed after the U.S. Postal Service and FBI declared the magazine obscene material, and it marks the first time the United States Supreme Court rules in favor of homosexuals.

=== 1959 ===
- Chinese American Hiram Fong becomes the first American of Asian descent to be elected to the U.S. Senate when he becomes Hawaii's first senator.
- Daniel Inouye becomes the first Japanese American elected to the U.S. Congress as Hawaii's first congressional representative.

== 1960s ==
=== 1964 ===
- Congress passes the Civil Rights Act, outlawing discrimination based on race, color, religion, sex, or national origin.

=== 1965 ===
- President Johnson signs a new immigration law that not only repeals the National Origins Act of 1924, but also establishes a new immigration policy to enable Asian immigrants to come to the United States. The National Origins Act of 1965 raises Asian immigration to 20,000 per year for Asian countries, same as European countries.

=== 1966 ===
- After transgender customers become raucous in a 24-hour San Francisco cafeteria, management calls police. When a police officer manhandles one of the patrons, she throws coffee in his face and a riot ensues, eventually spilling out onto the street, destroying police and public property. Following the riot, activists established the National Transsexual Counseling Unit, the first peer-run support and advocacy organization in the world.

=== 1968 ===
- Yuji Ichioka, an activist and founder of Asian American Studies, emphasizes the term “Asian American” as a political concept to replace the prevailing term “Oriental American.”

=== 1969 ===
- Patrons of the Stonewall Inn in Greenwich Village riot for three days when police officers attempt to raid the popular gay bar. Since its 1967 establishment, police officers had frequently raided the bar to "clean up" the neighborhood of "sexual deviants." Thousands of protesters received only minimal news coverage, but this event reignites the fire behind America's modern LGBT rights movement.

== 1970s ==
=== 1970 ===
- Christopher St. Liberation Day commemorates the one-year anniversary of the Stonewall riots. Following the event, thousands of members of the LGBT community march through New York into Central Park, in what will be considered America's first gay pride parade.

=== 1973 ===
- The board of the American Psychiatric Association votes to remove homosexuality from its list of mental illnesses.

=== 1976 ===
- Executive Order 9066, responsible for the evacuation, removal, and detention of persons of Japanese ancestry during World War II, is officially rescinded.

=== 1977 ===
- Lesbians start Asian American Feminists Support group; Monthly potluck/CR meetings

=== 1978 ===
- President Jimmy Carter signed a joint resolution to create Asian Pacific Heritage Week. In June 1977, Representatives Frank Horton of New York and Norman Mineta of California introduced a resolution to proclaim the first ten days of May as Asian-Pacific Heritage Week.
- In California, Asian American student activists from several college campuses form APSU (Asian Pacific Islander Student Union) to fight for educational rights. Among early issues taken up are defense of affirmative action and support for student campaigns to gain Asian American Studies at their campuses.

=== 1979 ===
- The Queer Asian Pacific Islander Alliance (QAPA) of New England holds a firm seat in LGBTQ history in Boston, Massachusetts. Founded in 1979 as Boston Asian Gay Men and Lesbians (BAGMAL), the organization was renamed the Alliance of Massachusetts Lesbians and Gay Men (AMALGM) in 1988. Today QAPA is the oldest LGBTQ Asian community organization in the United States. According to a newsletter (and cover photo) dated November 1987, members participated in the March on Washington for Gay and Lesbian Rights. The newsletter is part of the Asian American Resource Workshop records housed at Northeastern University's Archives & Special Collections in Boston.
- Unbound Feet (UF) formed as the first feminist Chinese American women's performance group with six Chinese American feminists including lesbian feminists Kitty Tsui, Canyon Sam, and Merle Woo

== 1980s ==
=== 1981 ===
- Controversy splits Unbound Feet and divides community of API lesbian feminists.
- The first official documentation of AIDS was published by the US Centers for Disease Control and Prevention on June 5, 1981.

=== 1982 ===
- Asian, Black, Latino gay men picket Castro St. Station Bar for discrimination over double ID card requirement
- Vincent Chin, a 27-year-old Chinese American in Detroit, is bludgeoned to death with a baseball bat by two unemployed autoworkers who blame layoffs in the auto industry on the Japanese. The two assailants mistake Chin for being Japanese. Although arrested, the two white men do not serve any jail time and are, in effect, given a mere slap on the wrist; they eventually violate probation and “disappear.” The case receives nationwide attention and mobilizes the Asian American community as a whole.
- Wisconsin becomes the first U.S. state to outlaw discrimination on the basis of sexual orientation.

=== 1983 ===
- Asian Lesbians of the East Coast (ALOEC) was founded in New York City.
- “Asian Women’s Potluck Gathering for Asian Lesbians,” first such publicly advertised event
- Asian lesbians protest Ollie's “Oriental Night,” an evening where the Oakland lesbian bar's employees wore "oriental" costumes and makeup.
- Kitty Tsui became the first known Chinese American lesbian to publish a book (Words of a Woman who Breathes Fire, published in 1983).
- Lani Kaʻahumanu and several other activists found BiPOL, the first and oldest bisexual political organization

=== 1984 ===
- Asian Lesbian basketball teams form and hold LA vs. SF game

=== 1985 ===
- Asian Pacific Sisters (APS) put out their first newsletter, Phoenix Rising

=== 1986 ===
- Trikone was founded in San Francisco, CA
- The fourth international lesbian and gay people of color (Int’l GLPOC) conference happens in LA; Asian Caucus creates resolution to organize in Los Angeles and San Francisco.
- The lesbian of color support group started at the Women's Building
- Trikone Newsletter was created for South Asian gays and lesbians
- Asian Caucus at ILIS Conference form Asian Lesbian Network in Japan, India, Thailand, and United States in Geneva, Switzerland

=== 1987 ===
- The first retreat of Asian lesbians in Northern California with 80 attendees
- 500,000 attend 2nd Nat’l March on Washington; First Gay & Lesbian Contingent
- Gay Asian Pacific Alliance, still unofficial, begins publishing the Lavender Godzilla
- In 1987, a 30-year-old Indian immigrant Navroze Mody was brutally beaten to death by a group of teenagers who called themselves "Dotbusters." This group was active in New Jersey, where a large South Asian immigrant community is concentrated.

=== 1988 ===
- Gay Asian Pacific Alliance (GAPA) officially founded in San Francisco, CA
- First Vietnamese G/L Support Group was formed
- Asian Lesbian film, “Between the Lines,” shown at SF Lesbian and Gay Film Festival
- Asian Pacific Sisters form
- Asian Pacific Lesbian Network (APLN) formed
- $3000 grant, APL National Conference is held; First Asian/Pacific Lesbian Network Planning meeting is held in Washington, DC
- The Civil Liberties Act of 1988 (Redress Bill HR 442 for Japanese Americans) is signed by President Reagan. It recognizes the grave injustice done to Japanese Americans with the nation's apologies. Each of the approximately 60,000 surviving persons who were sent away from their homes into the detention camps is offered $20,000 in compensation.

=== 1989 ===
- First National Asian Pacific Lesbian retreat, "Coming Together, Moving Forward" in Santa Cruz, California on September 1–4, 1989
- Hong Kong Lesbian & Gay Film Festival opens for the first time. It subsequently becomes the longest-running LGBT film festival in Asia

== 1990s ==
- A stream of ethnic focused LGBTQ+ organizations were started including: Asian Lesbian Bisexual (Seattle, Washington); Asian Pacific Lesbian Bisexual Transgender Network in Atlanta, Georgia; Los Angeles Asian Pacific Islander Sisters (LAAPIS) in Los Angeles, California; Kilawin Kolektibo, a Pilipina Group in New York City, NY; Chingusai (a Korean American gay, lesbian, and bisexual group) in Los Angeles, California; KoALA, a Korean American Lesbian and Bisexual group in Chicago, Illinois; and many others.

=== 1990 ===
- Gay Asian & Pacific Islander Men of New York (GAPIMNY) was founded
- First Asian Lesbian Network Conference in Bangkok, Thailand with 40-60 attendees.
- Three Asian athletes compete in Vancouver Gay Games III
- Pinay Dykes Party
- First Asian Pacific Lesbian contingent at SF Pride Parade
- Community Meeting to Restructure APS
- President George Bush designates May as Asian Pacific American Heritage Month.

=== 1991 ===
- Gay Vietnamese Alliance (GVA) was founded in San Jose, CA
- SALGA-NYC (South Asian Lesbian & Gay Association of New York City) was founded
- OASIS (Older Asian Sisters in Solidarity) Founded
- Homosexual acts in private between consenting adults decriminalized in Hong Kong
- Gay & Lesbian activist group sues Tokyo City Hall for gay discrimination in Japan

=== 1992 ===
- Purple Moon Dance Project was founded by Jill Togawa, a WOC dance company
- 1st South Asian contingent in India Day parade with SALGA-NYC
- Merle Woo reinstated as UC Berkeley Asian American Studies Lecturer
- Angie Fa, first Asian lesbian elected official, installed, SF Board of Education
- Massachusetts Area South Asian Lambda Association was founded in Boston (Boston MASALA)
- Tokyo International Lesbian & Gay Film Festival first opens in Tokyo, Japan

=== 1993 ===
- Trikone Atlanta, a social and support group for Lesbian, Gay, Bisexual and Transgender people of South Asian heritage and their friends, was founded
- In the GAP, a Gay and Lesbian API youth group, was formed
- Asian Lesbian, Bisexual and Gay Association (ALBA) later known as South Bay Queer & Asian (SbQA) forms in San Jose, CA
- UC Berkeley undergraduate group, Cal Asian Lesbian Bisexual & Gay Alliances You-United (CAL B GAY), was founded during the spring semester.
- 1st API G/L Contingent at SF Japantown Cherry Blossom Festival
- Last issue of Phoenix Rising was published
- “People Like Us,” a clandestine newsletter for Singaporean lesbians in Singapore begins to be published
- 1st Indonesian Gay & Lesbian Congress in Indonesia is held
- The Department of Defense issues a directive prohibiting the U.S. Military from barring applicants from service based on their sexual orientation. "Applicants... shall not be asked or required to reveal whether they are homosexual, " states the new policy, which still forbids applicants from engaging in homosexual acts or making a statement that he or she is homosexual. This policy is known as "Don't Ask, Don't Tell."

=== 1994 ===
- Asian and Pacific Islander Lesbians and Gays founded in Portland, Oregon.
- KHUSH-DC a South Asian LGBT Community based in D.C. founded.
- FABRIC (Fresh APIs Being Real in Our Community) a co-gender youth group founded
- MAPLBN (Mandarin-speaking API Lesbian, Bisexual Network) begins.
- Asian Pacific Sisters, OASIS (Older Asian Sisters in Solidarity), and Gay Asian Pacific Alliance marched in the 1994 San Francisco Chinese New Year Parade, which was the first time Asian gay and lesbian groups participated in this event.)
- 1st Gay & Lesbian Parade in Tokyo, Japan
- 1st OASIS (Older Asian Sisters in Solidarity) Retreat
- “Cover Girl/Cover Boy” Fundraising Dance for “Lavender Godzilla” and “Phoenix Rising”
- API-PFLAG Family Project forms; Asian family issues addressed for the first time
- “Do or Die?” Community meeting; APS (Asian Pacific Sisters) merges with APLBN (Asian Pacific Lesbian Bisexual Network)

=== 1995 ===
- Khuli Zaban, a South Asian Queer women's group founded by Leema Khan and Neena Hemmady in Chicago, IL.
- Asian Pacific Islander Queer & Questioning 25 & Under All Together (AQUA25) was founded in San Francisco, CA
- API-PFLAG Family Project forms
- Bugis Street, a ground-breaking Hong Kong-Singapore movie is released, featuring LGBT relationships and full-frontal Asian male adult nudity
- SAMBAL (Singaporean & Malaysian Bisexual Lesbian Women) forms in Bay Area
- Malaysian Gay & Lesbian Club forms in Bay Area
- Trikone's 10th Anniversary Celebration
- Pride Utsav 95 Conference & Celebration was created for Queer South Asians at UC San Francisco
- Rice Bowl was created; Queer API Sports Day with APS/LBN, GAPA, CAL B GAY, OASIS, Trikone 35+
- Queer API Student Conference, organized by CAL B GAY, was held at UC Berkeley in April.

=== 1996 ===
- Lotus Root Conference in Vancouver, BC
- Barangay-LA a gay Filipino organization was founded
- Chinese Rainbow Association (CRA) was founded in La Habra, CA
- Queer pan-Asian (initially South Asian) campus group Trikone-Tejas founded at the University of Texas at Austin.
- Filipino American Women's Network (FAWN) Conference in Minneapolis, Minnesota
- President Clinton signs the Defense of Marriage Act into law. The law defines marriage as a legal union between one man and one woman and that no state is required to recognize a same-sex marriage from out of state.

=== 1997 ===
- Asian Queers United for Action (AQUA) was founded in Washington, DC
- Satrang, an organization that serves Southern California's South Asian LGBT*Q community, was founded
- Homosexual sex was legalized in the People's Republic of China.

=== 1998 ===
- Asian Pacific Islander Queer Sisters (APIQS) was founded in Washington, DC

=== 1999 ===
- President Bill Clinton signs an Executive Order establishing a President's Advisory Commission on Asian Americans and Pacific Islanders (AAPIs) to address the health and human services needs of AAPIs, and to increase their participation in federal programs. It is only the second Executive Order issued concerning Asian Americans.
- Los Angeles Asian Pacific Islander Sisters (LAAPIS) disbands due to declining participation.

== 2000s ==
=== 2000 ===
- Asian Pacific Islander Queer Women & Transgender Community (APIQWTC) founded in the SF Bay Area.
- President Bill Clinton appoints Norman Mineta as U.S. Secretary of Commerce, the first Asian American to be appointed to the Cabinet.

=== 2001 ===
- Beijing Queer Film Festival opens for the first time in Beijing, the capital of China, and faces opposition from the Chinese government. It is founded by LGBT film director, Cui Zi'en
- SALGA-PHILLY (South Asian Lesbian and Gay Association of Philadelphia) founded
- GALVA - 108 (Gay & Lesbian Vaishnava Association), a nonprofit religious organization offering positive information and support to LBGTI Vaishnavas and Hindus, their friends, and other interested persons, is founded
- Korea Queer Film Festival opens for the first time, based in the city of Seoul, the capital of South Korea.
- Lan Yu, a mainland China-Hong Kong film, centring on a gay relationship between a young and a middle-aged man, features the full-frontal Asian adult male nudity of Chinese actor Liu Ye, who was 22 years old at the time of filming
- The 7 Sisters Coalition, an alliance of regional Asia Pacific HIV/AIDS networks, is formed, bringing together seven regional networks: the AIDS Society of Asia Pacific, the Asian Pacific Council of AIDS Service Organizations, the Asia Pacific Network of Lesbians, Gays, Bisexuals and Transgender, Asia Pacific Rainbow, the Asia Pacific Network of People Living with HIV/AIDS, the Asia Pacific Network of Sex Workers, the ASian Harm Reduction Network, and the Coordination of Action Research on AIDS and Mobility in Asia.
- In the week following 9/11, there were 645 reports of bias incidents perceived to be aimed at persons of Middle Eastern and South Asian descent. South Asians Balbir Singh Sodhi of Arizona, Waqar Hasan of Texas, and Vasudev Patel of Texas were all killed in post-9/11 hate crimes. Harassment and threats are most common, making up more than two-thirds of all reported incidents.
- Homosexuality was removed from the official list of mental illnesses in China.

=== 2002 ===
- Institute for Tongzhi Studies, which conducts research into gender and sexuality in Chinese societies, is founded in New York, NY
- Lotus Roots, a queer Asian Canadian conference, held in Vancouver, British Columbia
- Q! Film Festival opens for the first time, based in the city of Jakarta, the capital of Indonesia. It became Asia's largest LGBT film festival, until its closure in 2017

=== 2003 ===
- Shades of Yellow (SOY), a social gathering and safe space for Hmong LGBTQ, is founded in Minneapolis, MN
- Trikone-Michigan is founded

=== 2004 ===
- February: Mayor of San Francisco Gavin Newsom issues municipal marriage licenses to same-sex couples until March, when the practice is halted by California's Supreme Court. April: A rally of over 7,000 organized by Chinese American Christian leaders protests same-sex marriage in San Francisco.
- Coalition of groups convene at a regional conference at New York University entitled “Queer Asian Pacific Legacy” to organize and educate pan-Asian Pacific American LGBT communities. Co-sponsoring organizations include Gay Asian & Pacific Islander Men of New York (GAPIMNY), South Asian Lesbian and Gay Association (SALGA), Asian and Pacific Lesbian and Bisexual Women and Transgender Network (APLBTN), the National Gay and Lesbian Task Force Policy Institute, Asian & Pacific Islander Coalition on HIV/AIDS (APICHA), NYU Asian/Pacific/American Studies Program & Institute, Asian American Writers’ Workshop, Amnesty International OUTfront Program, Asian and Pacific Islander Queers United for Action (AQUA-DC), Asian Pacific Islander Queer Sisters (APIQS), Asian American Legal Defense and Education Fund (AALDEF), and Gay & Lesbian Alliance Against Defamation (GLAAD).
- AQWA (Asian/Pacific Islander Queer Women/Transgender Activists) is founded in LA
- API Equality - Northern California (APIENC) was officially founded in San Francisco, California.
- Asian Pacific Islander Pride Council is founded in Los Angeles, CA
- Pride International Film Festival opens for the first time, based in the city of Manila, the capital of the Philippines
- Q-Wave (Queer. Women & Trans. Asian. Visible. Empowered) is founded in New York City
- Massachusetts becomes the first state to legalize gay marriage. The court finds the prohibition of gay marriage unconstitutional because it denies dignity and equality of all individuals.

=== 2005 ===
- API Equality - LA was founded
- Trikone - Vancouver was founded
- Southeast Asian Queers United for Empowerment and Leadership (seaQuel) was founded in Providence, RI
- QPA (Queer Philadelphia Asians) was founded
- Chicago i2i (Invisible-to-Invincible API Pride of Chicago) was founded
- Dari Project was formed in New York, NY, which is a collection of stories of queer Korean folks in both Korean and English
- In the wake of Hurricane Katrina, Father Nguyen Vien organizes residents in the New Orleans East community to help residents return to their homes and rebuild their lives. His work especially impacts Versailles, a neighborhood in New Orleans whose residents are a tight knit group of Vietnamese Americans. Their story is documented in a film entitled, A Village Called Versailles, which becomes an award-winning documentary.

=== 2006 ===
- “In God’s House: Asian American Lesbian & Gay Families in the Church” the film was made a project of PANA

=== 2007 ===
- Asian Queer Film Festival opens for the first time, based in the city of Tokyo, the capital of Japan
- Gwen van Husen published “Desi Dykes: The Lives and Desires of Middle Class Women Who Love Women in Mumbai, India” at the University of Amsterdam

=== 2008 ===
- 1st QACON (Queer Asian Conference) at UC Berkeley
- City Without Baseball, a convention-defying Hong Kong film, is released. It features an LGBT young man and full-frontal Asian adult male nudity in several scenes featuring real members of the Hong Kong national baseball team, including Ron Heung
- Downe Organizing Project of Liwanag Kultural Center was founded in Daly City, CA

=== 2009 ===
- 1st National Queer Asian Pacific Islander Alliance (NQAPIA) conference held in Seattle, Washington.
- HOTPOT! a Philadelphia-based gathering working to build community for Queer Asian + Pacific Islander lesbian, bisexual women, trans*, gender variant/queer/non-conforming identified folks through social gatherings, political action and good food was founded separate from QPA. Based in Philadelphia tri-state area.
- Permanent Residence, a Hong Kong movie, is released. It features an LGBT attempted relationship and full-frontal Asian adult male nudity in several scenes, including that of Osman Hung, who at the time of filming, was a 19-year old Hong Kong Chinese Cantopop singer in Hong Kong pop group EO2
- The Matthew Shepard Act is passed by Congress and signed into law by President Obama on October 28. The measure expands the 1969 U.S. Federal Hate Crime Law to include crimes motivated by a victim's actual or perceived gender, sexual orientation, gender identity or disability.
- The Asian Pride Project was conceived by Q-Wave in 2009, and later joined by two other NYC-based community organizations, SALGA-NYC and GAPIMNY.

== 2010s ==
- 1st Queer Southeast Asian Conference in Minneapolis, Minnesota
- The U.S. Senate votes 65–31 to repeal "Don't Ask, Don't Tell" policy, allowing gays and lesbians to serve openly in the U.S. Military.
- Amphetamine, a Hong Kong film, is released. It features an LGBT relationship and the young adult Hong Kong Chinese actor Byron Pang, a former runner-up for the award of Mr. Hong Kong, who is shown in full-frontal nudity in several scenes
- Arizona passes strict illegal immigration act. The bill, known as SB 1070, makes it a misdemeanor to lack proper immigration paperwork in Arizona. It also requires police officers, if they form a “reasonable suspicion” that someone is an illegal immigrant, to determine the person's immigration status. Immigrant rights groups say it amounts to a police state. It is under examination to determine whether it is constitutional.

=== 2011 ===
- Amy Sueyoshi initiates Dragon Fruit Project in partnership with the GLBT Historical Society and APIQWTC to collect oral histories of LGBTQ API women and transgender activists from the 60s through the 90s.

=== 2012 ===
- DeQH a Desi lgbtQ Helpline for South Asians was created; the hotline can be reached at 908 - 367 - 3374
- The first Dragon Fruit Project exhibit, titled “For Love and Community” is mounted at the GLBT History Museum

=== 2013 ===
- API Equality - Northern California collaborates with Amy Sueyoshi and trains volunteers to interview, transcribe, film, and catalogue

=== 2014 ===
- Nikki "Tita Aida" Calma is recognized for her 20 years of activism as part of the 2014 Trans 100 list
- Taiwan International Queer Film Festival opens for the first time, based primarily in Taipei City, the capital of Taiwan
- The 2nd Dragon Fruit Project Exhibit, titled “History is Now: The Dragon Fruit Project” is mounted at the GLBT History Museum

=== 2015 ===
- Bangkok Gay and Lesbian Film Festival opens for the first time, based in the city of Bangkok, the capital of Thailand
- Nplooj Radio, a Hmong LGBTQIA+ radio show begins its broadcasting

=== 2017 ===
- Shades of Yellow closes its doors after fifteen years of service to the Minnesota metropolitan area.

=== 2018 ===
- Tadd Fujikawa came out as gay during a post on Instagram, becoming the first male professional golfer to publicly come out as gay.

=== 2019 ===
- Geena Rocero became the first openly transgender Asian-Pacific Islander model to pose for Playboy magazine.
- Wils (Pop Artist) makes History As The first Openly Gay Chinese Singer - Therainbowtimes

== 2020s ==
=== 2021 ===
- San Francisco marks the first Queer and Transgender Asian and Pacific Islanders Week in the United States.

== See also ==
- Timeline of South Asian and diasporic LGBT history
- Queer history in Chinatown, San Francisco
