= LGBTQ culture in San Francisco =

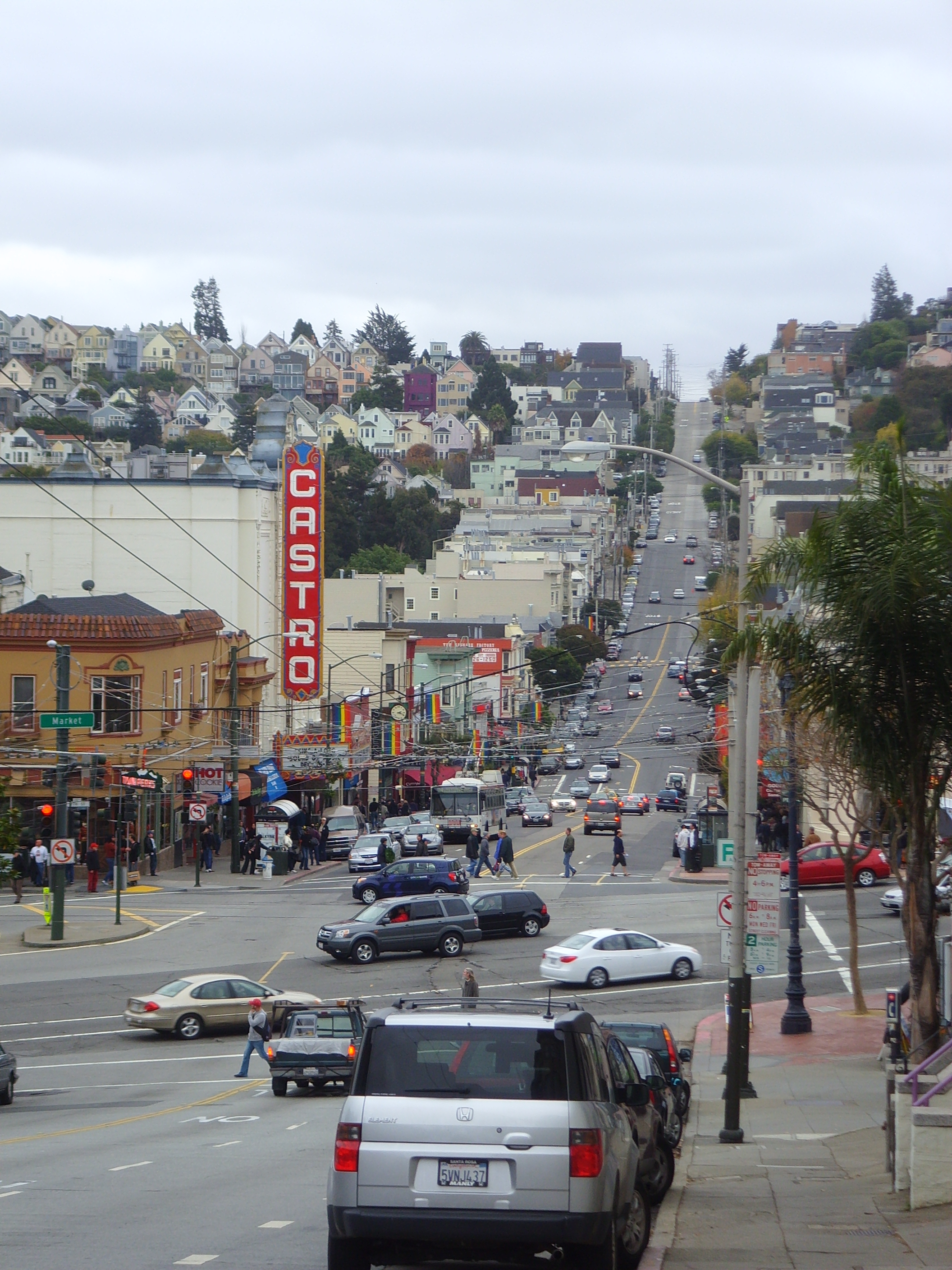
The Castro, the center of LGBT culture in San Francisco

The lesbian, gay, bisexual, and transgender (LGBT) community in San Francisco is one of the largest and most prominent LGBT communities in the United States, and is one of the most important in the history of American LGBTQ rights and activism alongside New York City. The city itself has been described as "the original 'gay-friendly city'". LGBTQ culture is also active within companies that are based in Silicon Valley, which is located within the southern San Francisco Bay Area.

== History ==
=== 19th century ===
San Francisco's LGBTQ culture has its roots in the city's own origin as a frontier town, what San Francisco State University professor Alamilla Boyd characterized as "San Francisco's history of sexual permissiveness and its function as a wide-open town – a town where anything goes". The discovery of gold saw a boom in population from 800 to 35,000 residents between 1848 and 1850. These migrants were composed of miners and fortune seekers from a variety of nationalities and cultures, over 95% of whom were young men.

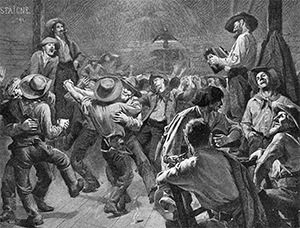
"Miner's Ball," 1891 etching by André Castaigne which portrays a men-only dance during the 1849 California gold rush

These transient and diverse populations thrust into a relatively anarchic environment were less likely to conform to social conventions. For example, with an unbalanced gender ratio, men often assumed roles conventionally assigned to women in social and domestic settings. Cross-gender dress and same-sex dancing were prevalent at city masquerade balls where some men assumed the traditional role of women going so far as to wear female attire. In her study "Arresting dress, cross-dressing in 19th-century San Francisco", Clare Sears also describes numerous cases of women who donned men's clothing in public spaces for increased social and economic freedom, safety, and gender-progressive experimentation.

The late 1800s saw a shift in the demographics of the city along with new social and political attitudes. Anti-vice campaigns emerged to target prostitution along with the criminalization of perceived gender transgressions including outlawing cross-dressing in 1863. Cross-dressing laws and public decency laws continued to influence LGBTQ culture and its interactions with law enforcement well into the 20th century. This political shift resulted in San Francisco's queer culture reemerging in bars, nightclubs, and entertainment of the Barbary Coast, removed from policing and control. Through the 1890s to 1907, the Barbary Coast, San Francisco's early red-light district located on Pacific Avenue, featured same-sex prostitution and female impersonators who served male clientele.

=== 20th century ===
==== Through WWII - in the shadows ====
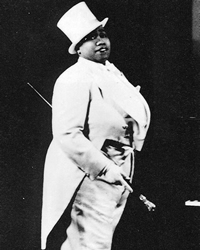
Gladys Bentley performed at the lesbian club Mona's in the 1930s

Michael Stabile of Out stated that the first "notorious" gay bar in San Francisco was The Dash, which opened in 1908. During World War I, the U.S. Navy began the "Blue discharge" practice, which discharged known homosexuals in port cities, helping to create a community of identified (blue discharge was not confidential) gays in San Francisco. The San Francisco LGBTQ community first fully formed in the 1920s and 1930s. The most prominent LGBTQ area then was North Beach. Mona's, San Francisco's first lesbian bar, opened on Union Street in 1934, and featured cross-dressing waitresses as well as entertainer Gladys Bentley. Nightclubs with drag shows drew both gay and straight audiences.

During World War II, US military started to systematically identify and exclude homosexuals, and those discharged on the Pacific theater ended up in the West Coast ports, mostly in the principal Pacific troop transport port of Fort Mason. Gay night life in San Francisco also went through several waves of crackdown and reorganization. From 1942 to 1943, the San Francisco Moral Drive—consisting of military patrols—carried out a series of raids targeting the gay bars in San Francisco, with the stated aim of protecting servicemen from homosexuals. Chinatown, as one of places where gay visitors gathered, had also been searched several times. For example, In 1943, the police raided the gay bar, Rickshaw in Chinatown, and arrested 24 patrons and two dozen customers, including a couple of lesbians who tried to fight back and triggered a small riot.

Todd J. Ormsbee, an American studies professor at San Jose State University who wrote The Meaning of Gay: Interaction, Publicity, and Community among Homosexual Men in 1960s San Francisco, stated that a "somewhat more open gay male culture" appeared in San Francisco due to the city's "relative safety" compared to other American cities and due to a "permissiveness" in the city's culture.

==== 1950s - the Beats, and first organizations ====
Beat culture erupted in San Francisco in the 1950s with a rebellion against middle class values and thus became aligned with homosexuality and other lifestyles not part of mainstream culture. The beat poets who relocated to San Francisco from New York flourished in San Francisco's permissive atmosphere, and some like Allen Ginsberg were openly gay. In these conditions the first homosexual groups were founded, such as the Daughters of Bilitis (founded in San Francisco, it was the first lesbian civil and political rights organization in the United States), and the Mattachine Society, which started in Los Angeles but was headquartered in San Francisco beginning around 1956. Police raids on The Black Cat bar, which had a bohemian and LGBTQ clientele and featured entertainer and activist José Sarria, sparked an important legal fight for homosexual protections in the 1950s.

==== 1960s - SF as gay capital, first struggles for recognition ====
In 1961 in San Francisco, José Sarria became the first openly gay candidate in the United States to run for public office, running for a seat on the San Francisco Board of Supervisors. Sarria almost won by default. On the last day for candidates to file petitions, city officials realized that there were fewer than five candidates running for the five open seats, which would have assured Sarria a seat. By the end of the day, 34 candidates had filed. Sarria garnered some 6,000 votes, shocking political pundits and setting in motion the idea that a gay voting bloc could wield real power in city politics. As Sarria put it, "From that day on, nobody ran for anything in San Francisco without knocking on the door of the gay community."

The Tavern Guild, the first gay business association in the United States, was created by gay bar owners in 1962 as a response to continued police harassment and closing of gay bars (including the Tay-Bush Inn raid), and continued until 1995.

The June 1964 Paul Welch Life article entitled "Homosexuality In America" marked the first time a national publication reported on gay issues. Life's photographer was referred to a gay leather bar in San Francisco called the Tool Box by Hal Call, who had long worked to dispel the myth that all homosexual men were effeminate. The article opened with a two-page spread of the mural of life size leathermen in the bar, which had been painted by Chuck Arnett in 1962. The article described San Francisco as "The Gay Capital of America" and inspired many gay leathermen to move there.

The Society for Individual Rights (SIR), founded in San Francisco in 1964, published the magazine Vector and became within two years the largest homophile organization in the United States. SIR focused on community building, public identity and legal and social services.

On the eve of January 1, 1965, several homophile organizations in San Francisco, California - including SIR, the Daughters of Bilitis, the Council on Religion and the Homosexual, and the Mattachine Society - held a fund-raising ball for their mutual benefit at the California Hall. San Francisco police had agreed not to interfere; however, on the evening of the ball, the police showed up in force and surrounded the California Hall and focused numerous kleig lights on the entrance to the hall. As each of the 600-plus persons entering the ball approached the entrance, the police took their photographs. A number of police vans were parked in plain view near the entrance to the ball. Evander Smith, a lawyer for the groups organizing the ball, and Herb Donaldson tried to stop the police from conducting the fourth "inspection" of the evening; both were arrested, along with two heterosexual lawyers - Elliott Leighton and Nancy May - who were supporting the rights of the participants to gather at the ball. But twenty-five of the most prominent lawyers in San Francisco joined the defense team for the four lawyers, and the judge directed the jury to find the four not guilty before the defense had even had a chance to begin their argumentation when the case came to court. This event has been called "San Francisco's Stonewall" by some historians; the participation of such prominent litigators in the defense of Smith, Donaldson and the other two lawyers marked a turning point in gay rights on the West Coast of the United States.

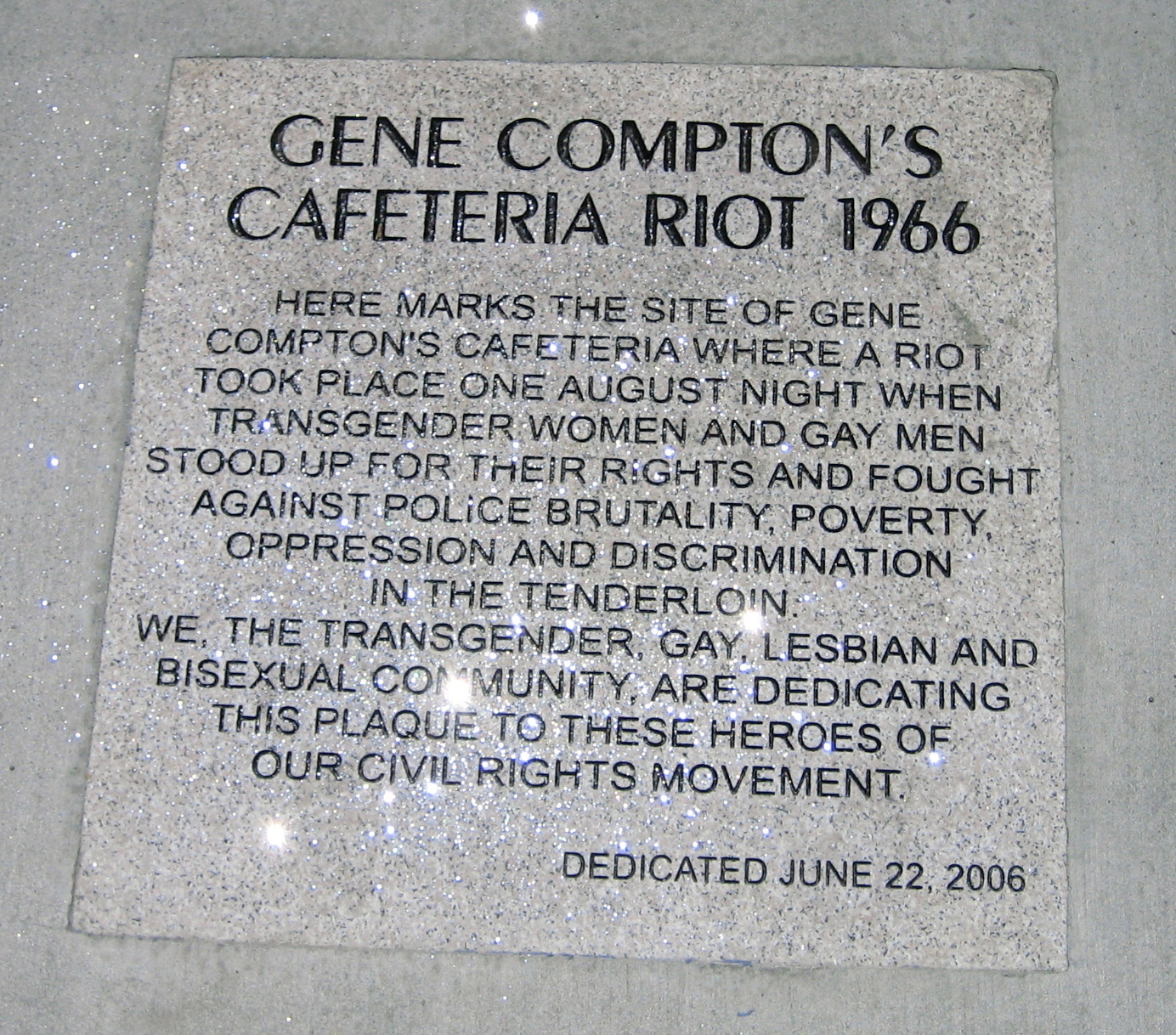
Plaque commemorating Compton's Cafeteria riot

Vanguard, an organization of LGBT youth in the low-income Tenderloin district, was created in 1965. It is considered the first Gay Liberation organization in the U.S.

In 1966, SIR opened America's first gay and lesbian community center. Also in 1966, one of the first recorded transgender riots in US history took place. The Compton's Cafeteria Riot occurred in the Tenderloin district of San Francisco. The night after the riot, more transgender people, hustlers, Tenderloin street people, and other members of the LGBTQ community joined in a picket of the cafeteria, which would not allow transgender people back in. The demonstration ended with the newly installed plate-glass windows being smashed again. According to the online encyclopedia glbtq.com, "In the aftermath of the riot at Compton's, a network of transgender social, psychological, and medical support services was established, which culminated in 1968 with the creation of the National Transsexual Counseling Unit [NTCU], the first such peer-run support and advocacy organization in the world".

One of the earliest organizations for bisexuals, the Sexual Freedom League in San Francisco, was facilitated by Margo Rila and Frank Esposito beginning in 1967. Two years later, during a staff meeting at a San Francisco mental health facility serving LGBT people, nurse Marguerite Rubenstein came out as bisexual. Due to this, bisexuals began to be included in the facility's programs for the first time. The number of San Francisco gay bars increased in the 1960s.

==== 1970s - Gay liberation, The Castro comes out ====
In the wake of the Stonewall riots in New York in June 1969, groups in New York, San Francisco and elsewhere became active in 1970 promoting rights for gays. Newspapers were established, and parades were organized in major cities commemorating the anniversary of the riots. These disparate efforts became known collectively as the Gay liberation movement in the United States, and primarily involved gay men and lesbians.

In 1970 gay activist groups on the West Coast of the United States held a march and 'Gay-in' in San Francisco. By 1972 this evolved into the Gay Liberation Day Parade, renamed several times since then to San Francisco Pride.

The identification of The Castro as a gay neighborhood identity began in the 1960s and 1970s as LGBT people began moving to the community. The first gay bar to have clear windows in San Francisco was Twin Peaks Tavern, which removed its blacked-out windows in 1972. The term "Castro clone" originated in this neighborhood when some gay men began to adopt a masculine clothing style which included denim jeans and a plaid shirt.

Lesbian bars and women's organizations began to proliferate in the 1970s, including bars like Maud's, Peg's Place, Amelia's, Wild Side West, and A Little More, as well as women's coffeehouses, a bookstore and a bathhouse. Many women's businesses and organizations were concentrated in the Valencia Street area of the Mission District.

The world's first gay softball league was formed in San Francisco in 1974 as the Community Softball League, which eventually included both women's and men's teams. The teams, usually sponsored by gay bars, competed against each other and against the San Francisco Police softball team. San Franciscans also created a gay university, Lavender U, and hosted the world's first gay film festival in 1977.

The Cockettes, a psychedelic gay theater collective started by Hibiscus, were popular entertainers of the early 1970s. One of their members, Sylvester, went on to achieve international acclaim during the Disco Era.

In 1976 Maggi Rubenstein and Harriet Levi founded The San Francisco Bisexual Center. It was the longest surviving bisexual community center, offering counseling and support services to Bay Area bisexuals, as well as publishing a newsletter, The Bi Monthly, from 1976 to 1984.

Peter Adair, Nancy Adair and other members of the Mariposa Film Group premiered the groundbreaking documentary on coming out, Word Is Out: Stories of Some of Our Lives, at the Castro Theater in 1977. The film was the first feature-length documentary on gay identity by gay and lesbian filmmakers.

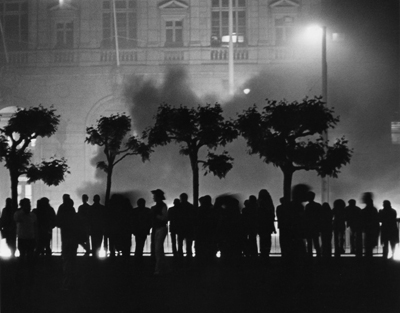
A light sentence for the murderer of Harvey Milk led to riots outside San Francisco City Hall May 21, 1979

In November 1977 Harvey Milk was elected as the first openly gay politician in the city of San Francisco; he became a member of the San Francisco Board of Supervisors. The Harvey Milk LGBT Democratic Club was founded as the San Francisco Gay Democratic Club in 1976 and received its current name in 1978 in honor of Harvey Milk after he was assassinated that year. This club was a more progressive offshoot of the Alice B. Toklas Democratic Club, founded in San Francisco in 1971, which was the first gay Democratic club of the United States. Harry Britt was president of the club when Milk was assassinated and was appointed by the Mayor Feinstein to succeed Milk as supervisor. Britt went on to be the second openly gay elected official in San Francisco, as well as the first openly gay official to become the President of the Board of Supervisors, writing and passing domestic partnership legislation. He passed rent control ordinances, was the highest elected gay official in the city during the onset of the AIDS epidemic, and later became a Vice Chair of the Democratic Socialists of America.

Anne Kronenberg was Milk's campaign manager during his San Francisco Board of Supervisors campaign, and later worked as his aide while he held that office. (While Kronenberg identified as a lesbian at that time, she later fell in love with and married a man she met in Washington, D.C. in the 1980s.) In 1978, lesbian Sally Miller Gearhart fought alongside Milk to defeat Proposition 6 (also known as the "Briggs Initiative" because it was sponsored by John Briggs), which would have banned gays and lesbians from teaching in public schools in California. Milk was murdered on November 27, 1978, in the Moscone–Milk assassinations. Riots broke out after the perpetrator, Dan White, received a manslaughter conviction, and was sentenced to seven years in prison.

Gilbert Baker raised the first LGBT Pride flag at San Francisco Pride on June 25, 1978.

San Francisco lesbian bar Peg's Place was the site of an assault in 1979 by off-duty members of the San Francisco vice squad, an event which drew national attention to other incidents of anti-gay violence and police harassment of the LGBT community and helped propel an (unsuccessful) citywide proposition to ban the city's vice squad altogether. Historians have written about the incident when describing the tension that existed between the police and the LGBT community during the late 1970s. The Sisters of Perpetual Indulgence started in the Castro District in 1979, and eventually became nationwide.

==== 1980s and 1990s - the AIDS crisis and response, and bi activism ====
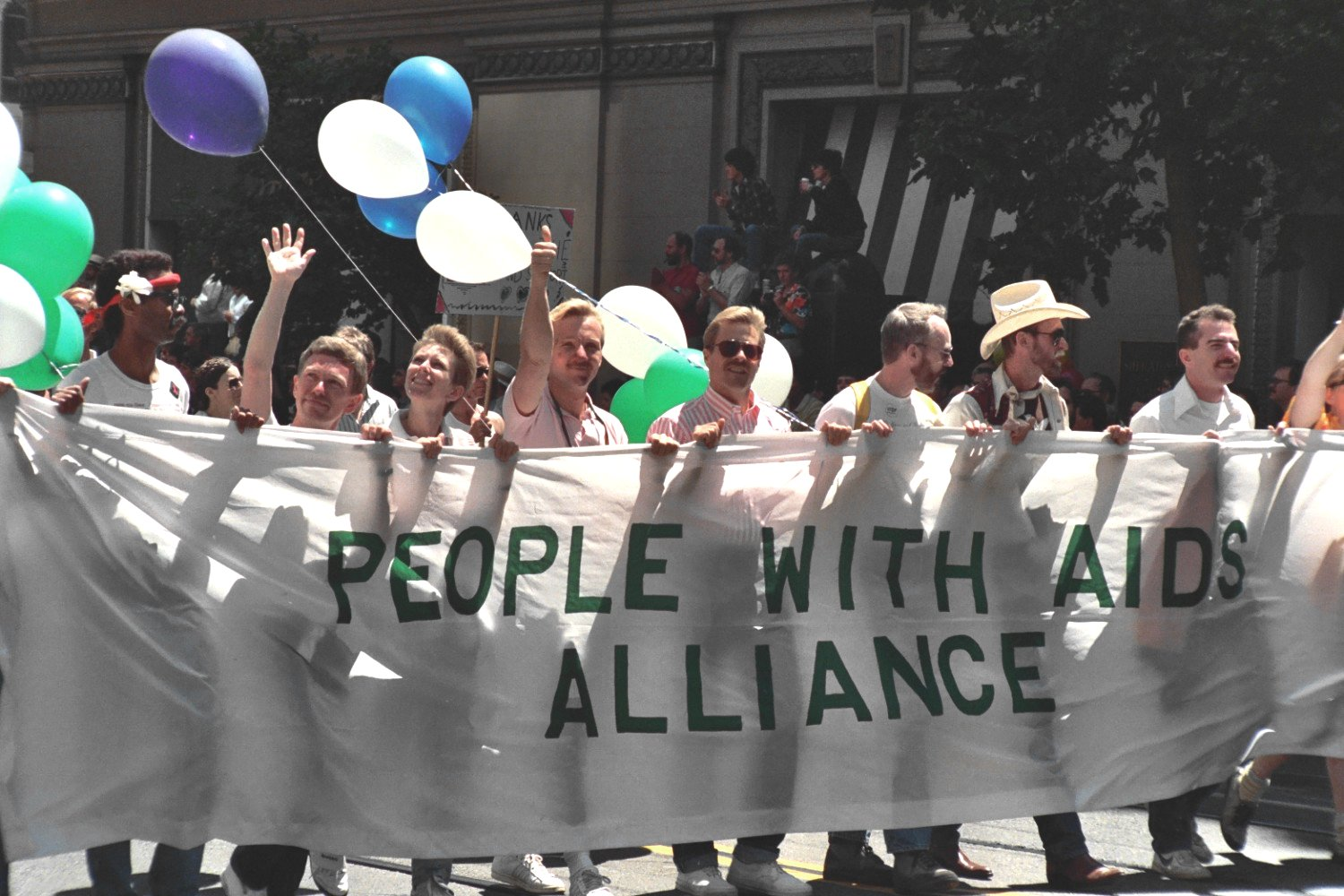
San Francisco Pride 1986

The San Francisco gay community was devastated by the AIDS epidemic following the discovery of the HIV virus in 1981.

In the early 1980s, AIDS began affecting the male LGBT population of San Francisco, with the disease continuing to have a fatal effect through the 1990s. 15,548 people in San Francisco had died due to AIDS prior to the introduction of drugs that treated AIDS, and a total of almost 20,000 people died within 15 years of the start of the AIDS crisis. The victims had obituaries in San Francisco-area LGBT newspapers. Randy Shilts, who himself later died of AIDS, was one of the foremost reporters of the AIDS epidemic. He was hired as a national correspondent by the San Francisco Chronicle in 1981, becoming the first openly gay reporter with a gay "beat" in the American mainstream press. In 1984, bisexual activist David Lourea finally persuaded the San Francisco Department of Public Health to recognize bisexual men in their official AIDS statistics (the weekly "New AIDS cases and mortality statistics" report), after two years of campaigning. Health departments throughout the United States began to recognize bisexual men because of this, whereas before they had mostly only recognized gay men. The 2011 documentary We Were Here covers the 1980s-1990s AIDS crisis in San Francisco. Made by David Weissman, the film opened in Los Angeles and received a screening at the Castro Theatre.

The term LGB referring to Lesbian, Gay and Bisexual first began to be used in the mid-to-late 1980s to more clearly indicate the inclusion of bisexuals.

The Gay Games were held in San Francisco in 1982 and 1986.

In 1984, the magazine On Our Backs began publication in San Francisco, featuring lesbian erotica by lesbians.

Bear culture began to be popularized among gay men with the publication of Bear Magazine in San Francisco in 1987.

BiNet USA, the oldest national bisexuality organization in the United States, was founded in 1990 under the name North American Multicultural Bisexual Network (NAMBN), and had its first meeting in San Francisco, at the first National Bisexual Conference in America. This first conference was held in 1990 and sponsored by BiPOL. Over 450 people attended from 20 states and 5 countries, and the mayor of San Francisco sent a proclamation "commending the bisexual rights community for its leadership in the cause of social justice," and declaring June 23, 1990 Bisexual Pride Day.

The first Eagle Creek Saloon, that opened on the 1800 block of Market Street in San Francisco in 1990 and closed in 1993, was the first black-owned gay bar in the city.

The first San Francisco Dyke March was held in June 1993, and is celebrated every year on the last Saturday in June.

=== After 2000 - same-sex marriage and trans awareness ===
The first decade of the new century saw a new awareness of transgender identity in San Francisco, with the establishment of the first Trans pride march in 2004 and heralded several important legal events in the movement towards Same-sex marriage in California, sparked by San Francisco mayor Gavin Newsom's move in 2004 to permit city hall to grant marriage licenses to same-sex couples.

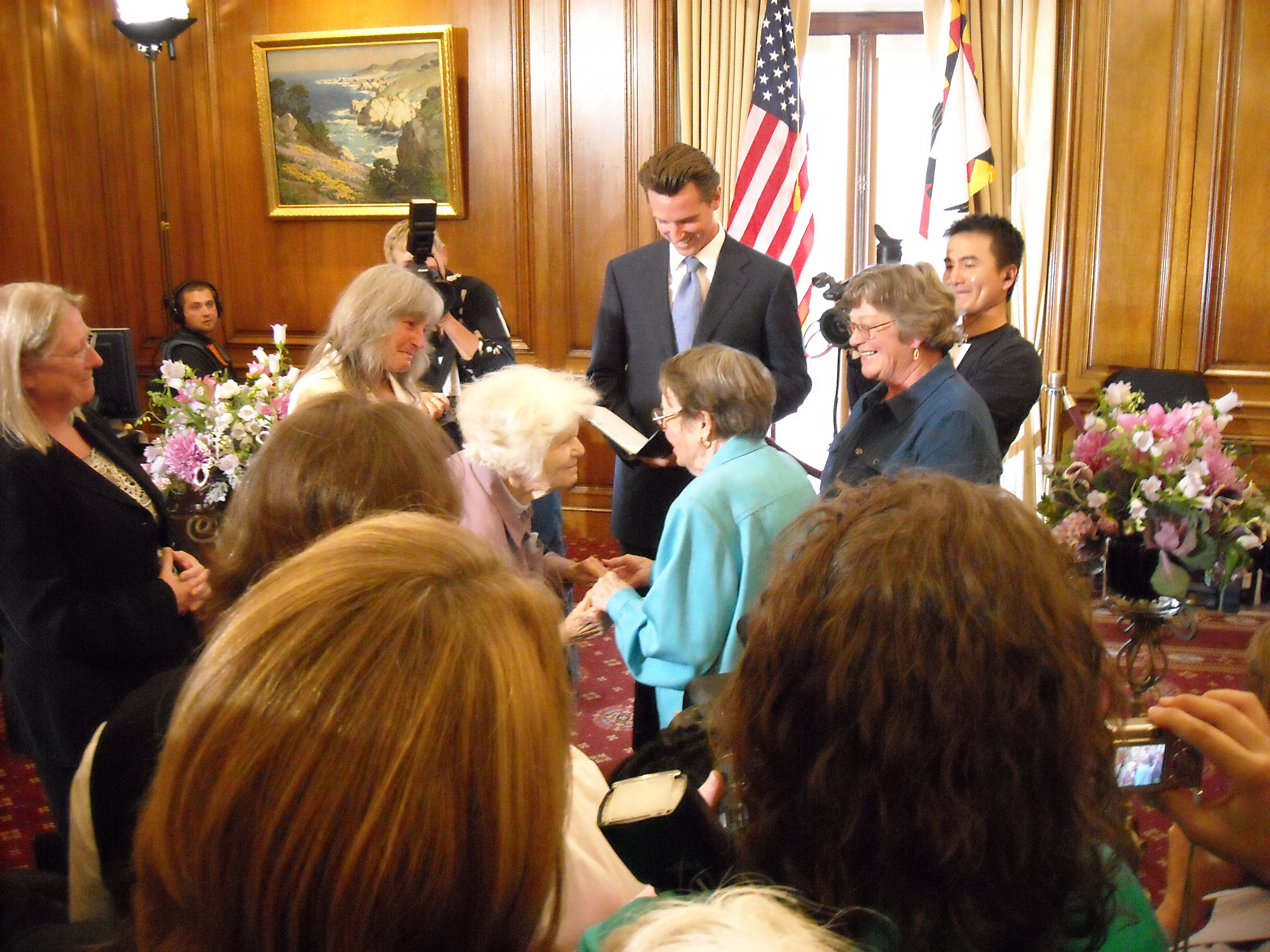
Activists Del Martin and Phyllis Lyon were married in San Francisco in 2004

Del Martin and Phyllis Lyon became the first same-sex couple to be legally married in the United States in 2004, However, all same-sex marriages done in 2004 in California were annulled in 2008 by California Prop 8 overturning a California Supreme Court decision in May 2008 that granted same-sex couples in California the right to marry (the same-sex couples who married in the June–November 2008 "window" were not annulled) . Same-sex marriages were halted until 2013, when the U.S. Supreme Court made them legal again in Hollingsworth v. Perry.

In 2004, the San Francisco Trans March was first held. It has been held annually since; it is San Francisco's largest transgender Pride event and one of the largest trans events in the entire world.

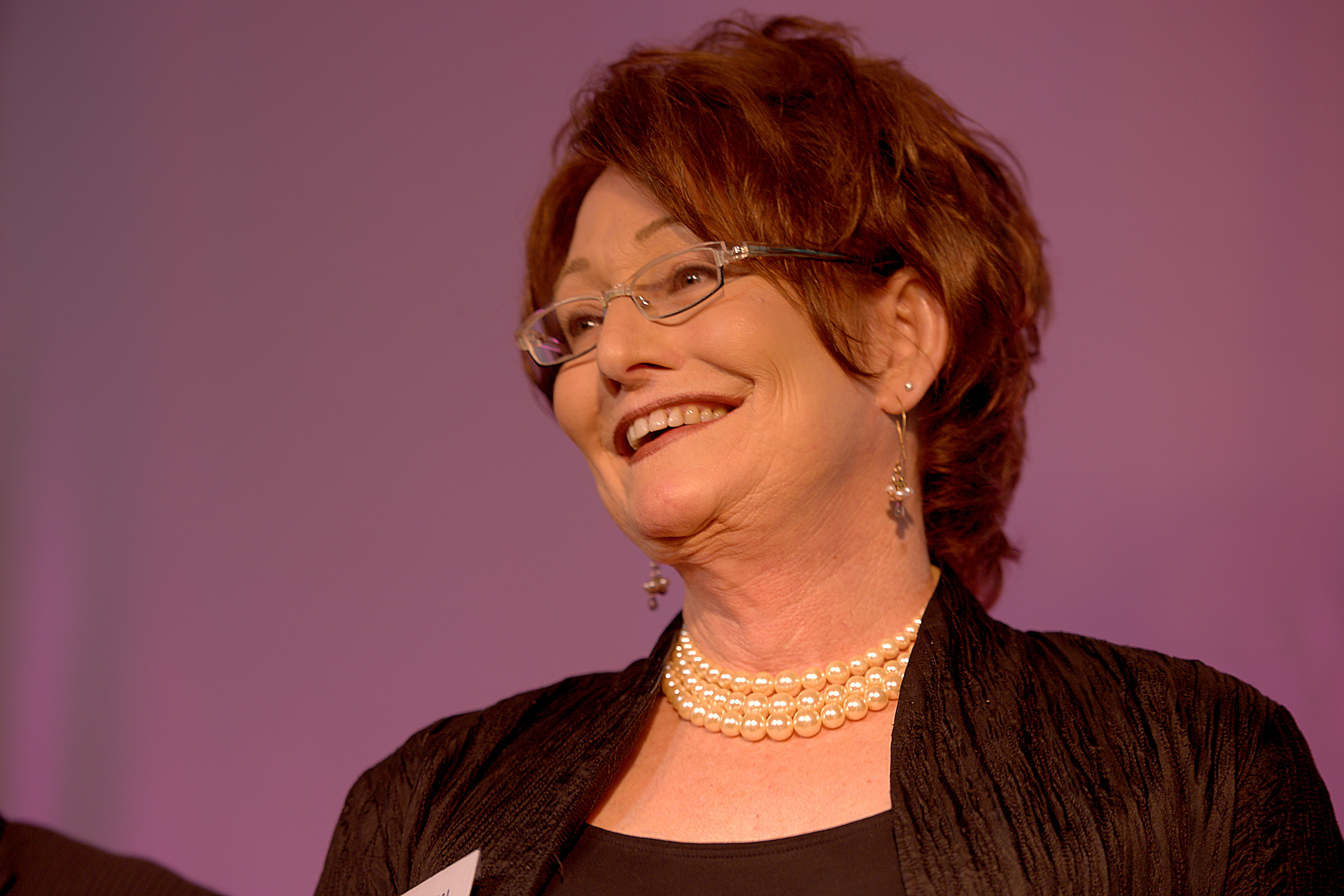
Theresa Sparks, transgender president of the Police Commission, 2010

In 2007, Theresa Sparks was elected president of the San Francisco Police Commission by a single vote, making her the first openly transgender person ever to be elected president of any San Francisco commission, as well as San Francisco's highest ranking openly transgender official.

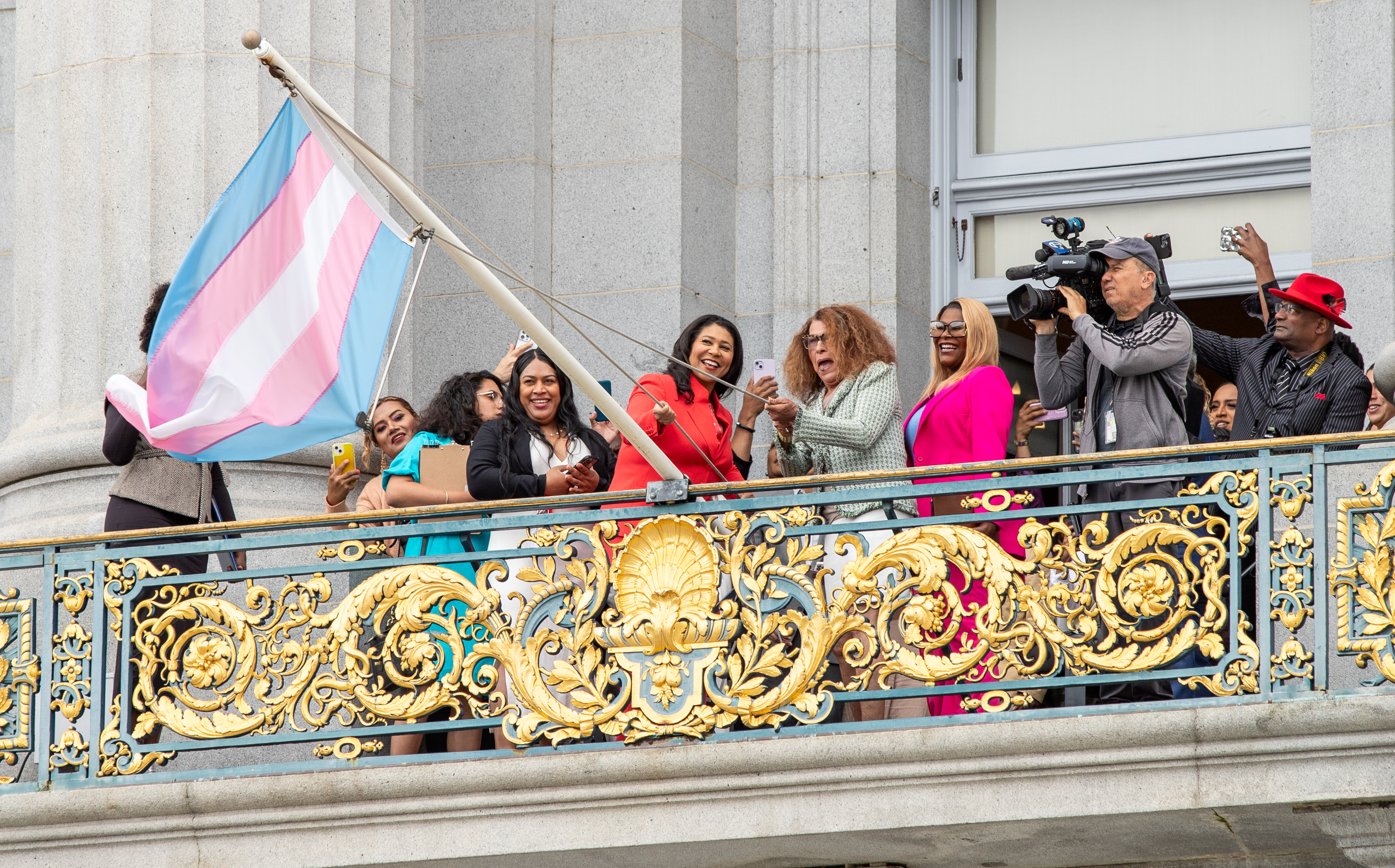
Mayor London Breed and trans activist Donna Personna raise the trans pride flag outside City Hall, 2023

In 2011, San Francisco's Human Rights Commission released a report on bisexual visibility, titled "Bisexual Invisibility: Impacts and Regulations"; this was the first time any governmental body released such a report.

In 2013, San Francisco Board of Supervisors member David Campos started a campaign to have San Francisco International Airport renamed for Harvey Milk.

Pete Kane of the SF Weekly stated in 2014 that assimilation into mainstream society, "displacement due to the explosive cost of living, and atomization in the face of handheld sex" are all trends that have the potential to diminish the "LGBT community" and that these trends are "felt most acutely" in San Francisco.

In 2016, the San Francisco Board of Supervisors passed a law, authored by Scott Wiener, barring the city from doing business with companies that have a home base in states such as North Carolina, Tennessee, and Mississippi, that forbid civil rights protections for LGBT people

In 2017, the Compton's Transgender Cultural District in the Tenderloin became the first legally recognized transgender district in the country.

In 2019, Jeanine Nicholson, who is gay, became San Francisco's first openly LGBT fire chief.

In 2019, San Francisco Board of Supervisors member Rafael Mandelman authored an ordinance to create the Castro LGBTQ Cultural District; the ordinance was passed unanimously.

In 2021, San Francisco officially recognized August as Transgender History Month, becoming the first city in the country to make such a declaration.

== Organizations and community institutions ==
The Daughters of Bilitis (DOB) was founded in San Francisco in 1955 by four lesbian couples (including Del Martin and Phyllis Lyon) and was the first national lesbian political and social organization in the United States.

The Mattachine Society moved its headquarters from Los Angeles to San Francisco in the 1950s.

The Alice B. Toklas Memorial Democratic Club, a centrist LGBT Democratic Party organization, was founded around 1971.

In 1975, the Gay Latino Alliance (GALA) was founded in San Francisco, spurred by an interest in creating a Latino float for the San Francisco Gay Pride Parade. It was one of the first gay Latino organizations to exist in the United States and was situated in the Mission District of San Francisco. The group was created in response to the lack of focus on intersectionality in the San Francisco gay community. The alliance raised funds through dances and other events and donated the money to political grassroots campaigns. One of its founders, Diane Felix, also co-founded various different queer organizations including Community United in Response to AIDS/SIDA (CURAS) in 1981 and Proyecto ContraSIDA por Vida in 1993.

Proyecto ContraSIDA por Vida is a community based, grass roots HIV prevention organization in the Mission district. Notable participants and employees within the organization includes Adela Vazquez, Proyecto's first trans Latina outreach coordinator.

In 1983, BiPOL, the first and oldest bisexual political organization, was founded in San Francisco by bisexual activists Autumn Courtney, Lani Ka'ahumanu, Arlene Krantz, David Lourea, Bill Mack, Alan Rockway, and Maggi Rubenstein. In 1984, BiPOL sponsored the first bisexual rights rally, outside the Democratic National Convention in San Francisco. The rally featured nine speakers from civil rights groups allied with the bisexual movement.

In 1987, the Bay Area Bisexual Network, the oldest and largest bisexual group in the San Francisco Bay Area, was founded by Lani Ka'ahumanu, Ann Justi and Maggi Rubenstein.

The oldest national bisexuality organization in the United States, BiNet USA, was founded in 1990. It was originally called the North American Multicultural Bisexual Network (NAMBN), and had its first meeting at the first National Bisexual Conference in America. This first conference was held in San Francisco in 1990, and sponsored by BiPOL. Over 450 people attended from 20 states and 5 countries, and the mayor of San Francisco sent a proclamation "commending the bisexual rights community for its leadership in the cause of social justice," and declaring June 23, 1990 Bisexual Pride Day.

From the 1970s to the 1980s, Asian American LGBT community began their movement, establishing a number of Asian American gay and lesbian organizations in San Francisco. Gay Asian Pacific Alliance is one of the organizations that led the movements for queer Asian Americans to go against racism and sexism. In the following activities, they ran the HIV program for queer people, especially queer people of color. In 1994, the Gay Asian Pacific Alliance and Asian Pacific Sister joined the Chinese New Year Parade, which was the first time that queer Asian American communities had attended in a publicly ethnic activity.

The GLBT Historical Society, founded in 1985, maintains one of the world's largest archives of LGBT-related materials. Since 2011, it also has operated the GLBT History Museum in the Castro District.

The Golden Gate Business Association is an LGBT version of a traditional chamber of commerce. The LGBT entrepreneurship organization StartOut is also based in the city. The Bay Area Career Women is a lesbian professional development group.

The San Francisco LGBT Community Center is in San Francisco. The substantial LGBT population led to some publishers applying the moniker San Fagcisco to the city, while inhabitants were given the demonym San Fagciscan. Blow Buddies was the city's largest gay bathhouse and was dedicated to fellatio, before closing permanently in 2020. In 2022, new management announced plans to create a new entertainment venue at the Castro theater.

In 2023, for the first time, the San Francisco Pride parade organizers began requesting donations to keep the parade financially afloat. In June 2023, the San Francisco Board of Supervisors voted against landmarking the seats in the physically deteriorating Castro Theater, moving closer to allowing the Another Planet Entertainment company to begin renovating the decaying structure, including replacing the existing seating with a more modern seating arrangement.

== Demographics ==
In the 1970s, the city's gay male population rose from 30,000 at the beginning of the decade to 100,000 in a city of 660,000 at the end of it.

In 1993 Stephen O. Murray, in "Components of Gay Community in San Francisco," wrote that most LGBT residents of San Francisco had originated from other cities and had "come out" in other cities. A 2015 Gallup poll found that 6.2% of San Francisco-Oakland-Hayward inhabitants identified as LGBT, the highest of any metropolitan area in the United States. In the city of San Francisco itself, a 2006 survey found that 15.4% of its inhabitants identified as LGBT. In U.S. Congressional District 8, which consists of San Franciscans of voting age, 16.6% of adults identify as LGBT.

According to a 2013 survey, 29% of the homeless residents of San Francisco identify as LGBT.

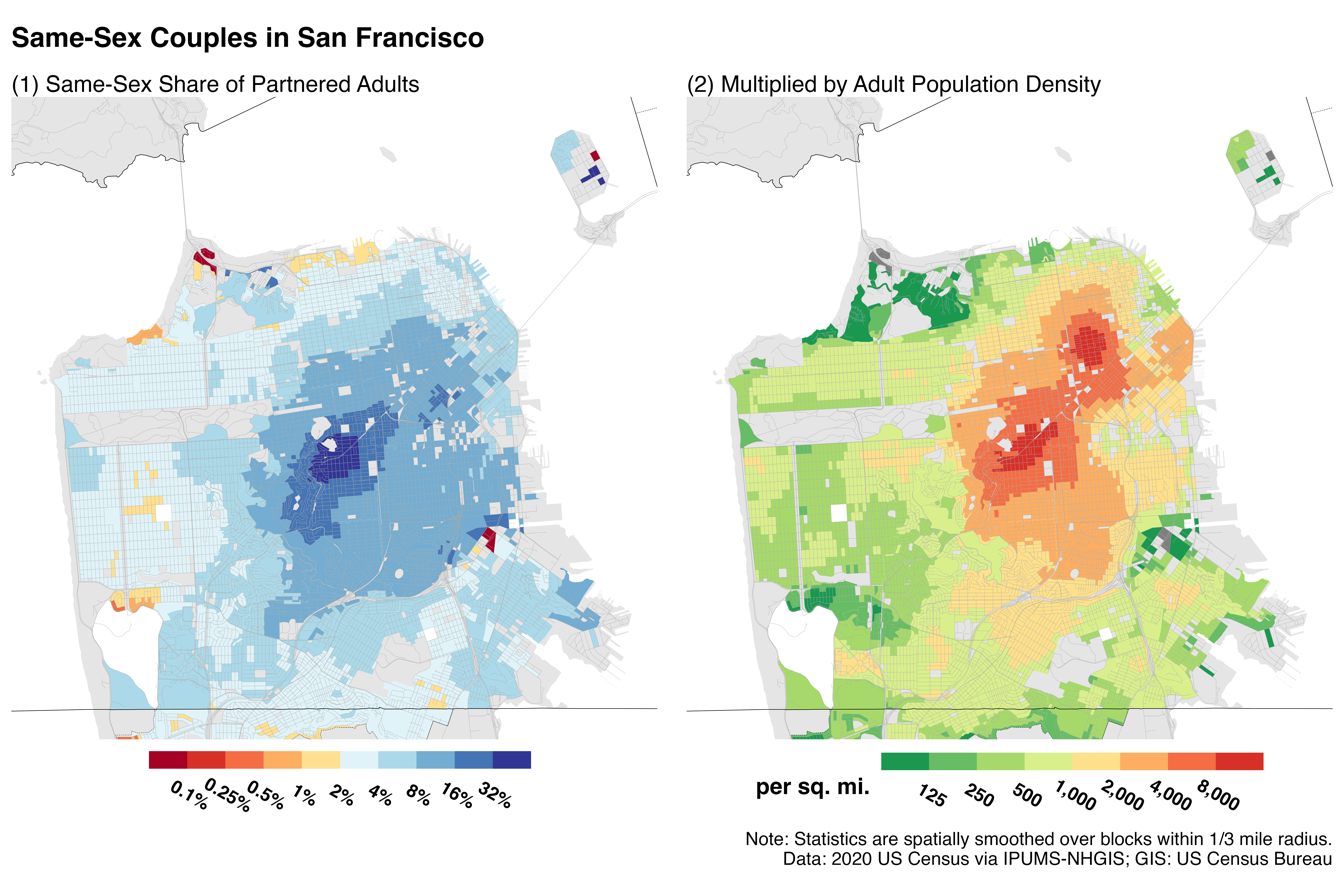
Map of same-sex couples in San Francisco

== Neighborhoods ==
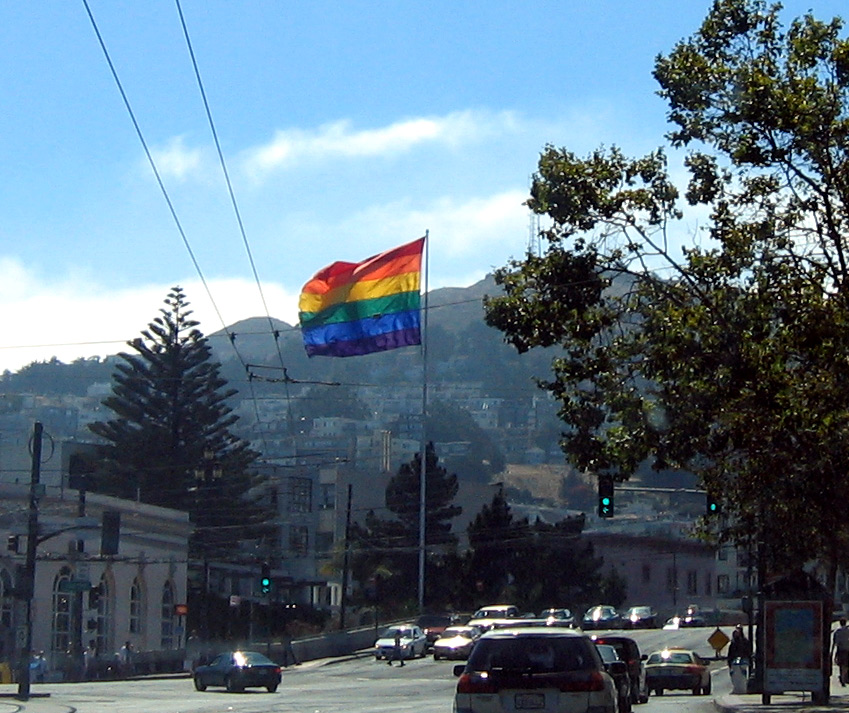
Gay Pride flag above Harvey Milk Plaza in The Castro neighborhood

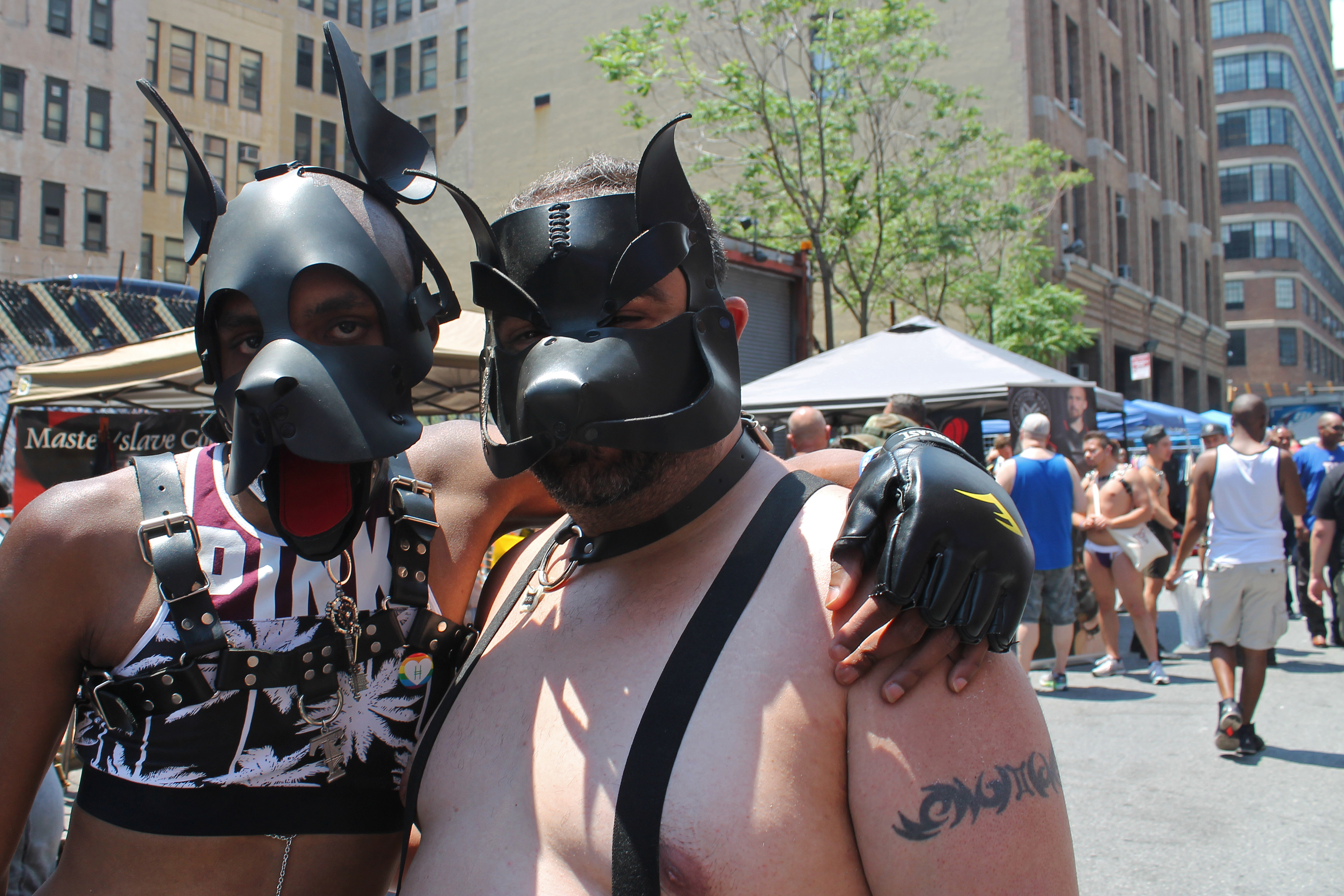
Folsom Street Fair, San Francisco, California

In the 1920s and 1930s the most prominent LGBT area was North Beach. Polk Gulch was a popular gay neighborhood from the 1950s to the 1980s, hosting the original annual Halloween street fair which later moved to the Castro. Folsom Street was the home of the first leather bars, and still hosts the annual leather subculture street fair and food court event, held in September, Folsom Street Fair. In 1977, a large portion of the LGBT community was centered in the upper Market Street and Haight-Ashbury area.

The Castro area of San Francisco is most well known as a gay neighborhood. This began in the 1960s and 1970s as LGBT people began moving to the community. It was where Harvey Milk had his camera shop and did much of his organizing in the 1970s. The neighborhood now features permanent rainbow Pride flags, an LGBT History Museum, and a Walk of Fame with the names of notable LGBT people inscribed on the sidewalk. While The Castro retained its identity, in 2014 Spencer Michels of PBS Newshour stated that The Castro had become "a little more heterosexual, a slightly upscale shopping street".

The Mission has long been a neighborhood with a strong queer Latino/a presence, and was home to the first Latino gay bar in San Francisco, Esta Noche, along with other gay Latino bars like La India Bonita, and El Rio. The Mission also was the home to Proyecto ContraSIDA por Vida, a Latino/a HIV Prevention organization. Lesbians, Latina and non-Latina, were particularly drawn to this neighborhood in the 1980s; it has hosted several lesbian bars, a Women's Center, coffeehouses, a bookstore, and a woman-only bathhouse.

Chinatown in San Francisco is also a place closely related to LGBT culture, where its history about sexuality began with the development of sexual industry in the middle of the 19th century. In the middle of the 20th century, as the number of nightclubs and gay bars increased in Chinatown, Chinatown became the most famous spot for sex tourism, attracting LGBT clients from all over the world. In 1994, Gay Asian Pacific Alliance and Asian Pacific Sisters initially joined the Chinese New Year Parade in Chinatown, which was first time that Chinese American society had accepted Asian American LGBT organizations publicly.

== Culture and recreation ==
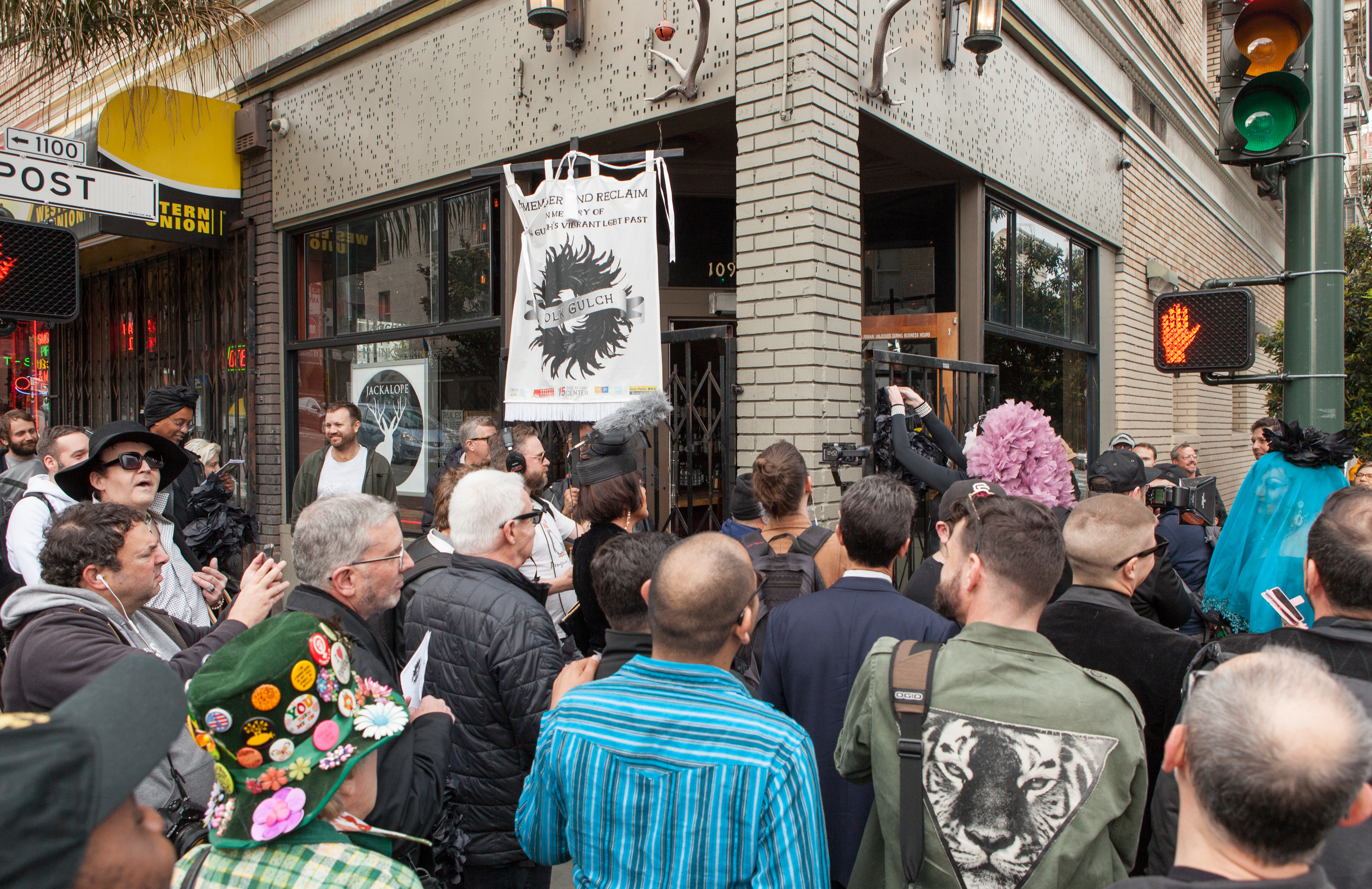
A crowd watches Sister Roma of the Sisters of Perpetual Indulgence hang a wreath at the site of a former gay bar during the March to Remember and Reclaim Queer Space in the Polk Gulch, March 2018

Gay bars and lesbian bars became LGBT community centers and areas where LGBT residents had public visibility. Michael Stabile of Out stated that the first "notorious" gay bar was The Dash, which opened in 1908. The number of San Francisco gay bars increased in the 1960s. In 1973, there were 118 gay bars listed in the San Francisco Gay Yellow Pages, in 2011, there were 33. The first gay bar to have clear windows was Twin Peaks Tavern, which removed its blacked-out windows in 1972. The first gay Latino bar was Esta Noche, in 1979. In 2014 Pete Kane stated that as same-sex rights and culture became mainstream, some gay bars in the city had closed due to gentrification or became "post-gay". More importantly, the rapid loss of tens of thousands of San Francisco gay men during the height of the HIV/AIDS epidemic heavily contributed to the loss of many gay bars in the city.

Despite being known as one of the LGBTQ "meccas" of America, San Francisco has a severe lack of designated gathering spaces for lesbians compared to gay men. Lesbian-centric establishments have always struggled to remain open. The Lexington Club, the last popular mostly-lesbian bar in San Francisco, closed in 2015.

In the 1970s, softball games became a popular form of recreation for gay men and lesbians, with bar-sponsored teams competing against each other, as well as against the San Francisco police. LGBTQ athletic leagues in sports outside softball have become just as popular among the city's LGBTQ population.

The San Francisco South of Market Leather History Alley consists of four works of art along Ringold Alley honoring leather culture; it opened in 2017. The four works of art are: engraved standing stones that honor community leather institutions including the Folsom Street Fair and leather pride flag pavement markings through which the stones emerge, a black granite stone etched with a narrative by Gayle Rubin, an image of the "Leather David" statue by Mike Caffee, and a reproduction of Chuck Arnett's 1962 mural that was in the Tool Box (a gay leather bar), and metal bootprints along the curb which honor 28 people who were an important part of the leather communities of San Francisco.

The National Queer Arts Festival and Frameline, the latter of which is the largest and oldest LGBT film festival, are held in San Francisco. The city is also home to the San Francisco Transgender Film Festival, the world's oldest transgender film festival.

Harvey Milk had founded the Castro Street Fair. Other events include San Francisco Pride, the Folsom Street Fair, and Pink Saturday.

The San Francisco Gay Men's Chorus and the Lesbian/Gay Chorus of San Francisco are both based in the city.

The San Francisco Lesbian/Gay Freedom Band is the first openly gay musical organization in the world. In 2018, the Board of Supervisors officially designated them as the official band of San Francisco.

The GLBT Historical Society Museum is in the Castro District.

== Media ==
The LGBT-centric area newspapers are the Bay Area Reporter, San Francisco Bay Times, and San Francisco Sentinel. Lesbian-centric magazines published in the city are Curve and Girlfriends.

The growing LGBT population led to some publishers applying the moniker San Fagcisco to the city, while inhabitants were given the demonym San Fagciscan.

== Politics ==
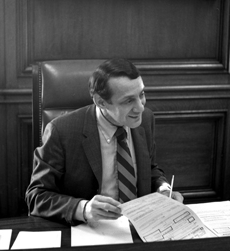
Harvey Milk, San Francisco's first openly gay politician, 1978

San Francisco has open LGBT identity participation in its political system. In 2012 William Harless of PBS Newshour stated that "the gay political scene in San Francisco [is] still an exception".

In November 1977 Harvey Milk was elected as the first openly gay politician in the city of San Francisco; he became a member of the San Francisco Board of Supervisors. The Harvey Milk LGBT Democratic Club was founded as the San Francisco Gay Democratic Club in 1976 and received its current name in 1978 in honor of Harvey Milk after he was assassinated. This club was a more progressive offshoot of the Alice B. Toklas Democratic Club, founded in San Francisco in 1971, the first gay Democratic club of the United States. Harry Britt was president of the club when Milk was assassinated and was appointed by the Mayor Dianne Feinstein to succeed Milk as supervisor. Britt went on to be the second openly gay elected official in San Francisco, as well as the first openly gay official to become the President of the Board of Supervisors, writing and passing domestic partnership legislation. He successfully passed rent control ordinances, was the highest elected gay official in the city during the onset of the AIDS epidemic, and later became a Vice Chair of Democratic Socialists of America.

Anne Kronenberg, who was openly lesbian, was Milk's campaign manager during his San Francisco Board of Supervisors campaign, and later worked as his aide while he held that office. In 1978, lesbian Sally Miller Gearhart fought alongside Milk to defeat Proposition 6 (also known as the "Briggs Initiative" because it was sponsored by John Briggs), which would have banned gays and lesbians from teaching in public schools in California. Milk was murdered on November 27, 1978, in the Moscone–Milk assassinations. Riots broke out after the perpetrator, Dan White, received a manslaughter conviction, and was sentenced to seven years in prison.

Both the Alice B. Toklas Memorial Democratic Club and the Harvey Milk LGBT Democratic Club raise money during the Alice Pride breakfasts, held each June and attended by the Mayor of San Francisco and other area politicians. In 2012 members of the Barack Obama reelection campaign attended the breakfast. In 2014, Lynn Rapoport of the San Francisco Bay Guardian stated that in San Francisco there are "possibly even some Log Cabin Republicans."

=== Proposition 8 ===
The political participation for and against California Proposition 8, which sought to outlaw gay marriage, depended on race, age, level of education, and religious affiliation; there were high income neighborhoods that voted for the proposition and high income neighborhoods that voted against the proposition. More strongly religious persons were more likely to vote in favor of the proposition. Whites had a lower likelihood of being pro-Proposition 8 while blacks and Asians voted more strongly in favor of the proposition. People with university degrees voted mostly against the proposition while those who only had a high school diploma voted mostly for the proposition. The 18-29 age group voted strongly against Proposition 8 and the 60 and older age group voted strongly for it. Chinese American Voter Education Committee (CAVEC; Chinese: 華裔選民教育委員會; pinyin: Huáyì Xuǎnmín Jiàoyùwěiyuánhuì) director David Lee (李志威; Lǐ Zhìwēi) stated that immigrants who had been in San Francisco for longer than ten years largely voted against the proposition while those who had been in the city for fewer than 10 years largely voted for it.

In 2008, out of the 580 precincts in San Francisco, all but 54 voted against Proposition 8. Neighborhoods voting strongly against Proposition 8 included Laurel Heights, Marina, and Mission Bay. The Mission District precinct around the 24th Street BART Station had about a 20% vote in favor of Proposition 8. About 24% of those in Sea Cliff voted for Proposition 8, and the percentage of those in St. Francis Wood voting in favor of the proposition was 35%. In The Castro 3% of voters had voted in favor of Proposition 8.

Areas voting over 50% in favor of Proposition 8 included portions of Bayview-Hunters Point, the Excelsior, communities around Lake Merced, and Visitacion Valley. Some residents of Visitacion Valley stated that they did not want their children to learn about gay marriage in school; they mistakenly believed that the measure would ban children from learning about gay marriage at school. Other Visitacion Valley residents cited their religious beliefs. Chinatown was among the areas most heavily voting for Proposition 8; David Lee stated that Yes on 8 caused many Chinese-speaking voters to vote for the proposition by taking out advertisements in area Chinese newspapers. The areas with the highest percentages of for votes were in portions of Chinatown and Downtown, which were 65% in favor. The parts of Downtown included the condominiums of the Four Seasons Hotel, San Francisco and the St. Regis Museum Tower as well as other city blocks around Bloomingdale's. Political consultant David Latterman stated that the residents in that area had recently moved into San Francisco and were less connected to the city compared to those in other wealthy areas.

== In fiction ==
The series' Tales of the City and Looking depict LGBT culture in San Francisco.

The novel Valencia by Michelle Tea explores the lesbian culture of the 1990s Mission District.

The novel A Horse Named Sorrow by Trebor Healey is set in San Francisco in the 1980s and 90's.

The Emma Victor series of mystery novels by Mary Wings is about a San Francisco lesbian private investigator.

In Pixar's 2015 film Inside Out, LGBT culture is referenced by Anger by mentioning that he saw someone in San Francisco who resembles a bear.

== Notable people ==
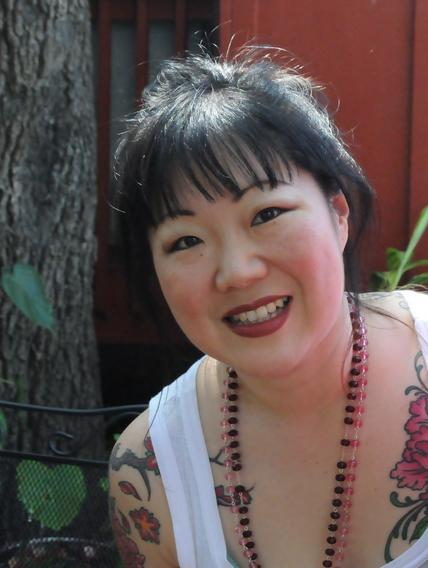
Margaret Cho, a bisexual comedian native to San Francisco, 2009

=== Politicians and officials ===
- Roberta Achtenberg, politician
- Tom Ammiano, activist and politician
- Harry Britt (activist and city supervisor)
- David Campos (gay member of the San Francisco Board of Supervisors)
- Matt Dorsey, politician
- Bevan Dufty, politician
- Joel Engardio, politician
- Rafael Mandelman, politician
- Carole Migden, politician
- Harvey Milk (gay former member of the San Francisco Board of Supervisors)
- Mark Leno, politician
- Jeff Sheehy, politician
- Scott Wiener, politician

=== Activists and cultural figures ===
- Gilbert Baker, artist and creator of the Rainbow flag
- Bobbi Campbell, AIDS activist
- Margaret Cho, (bisexual comedian and native San Franciscan.)
- Cecilia Chung, activist
- Lea DeLaria, comedian, actress and musician whose career started in San Francisco
- Cleve Jones (gay activist)
- Ken Jones, activist
- Jim Foster, activist
- Sally Miller Gearhart, activist
- Roma Guy, activist
- Lenn Keller (photographer, founder of the Bay Area Lesbian Archive)
- Bill Kraus (gay rights and AIDS activist)
- Marsha H. Levine (LGBTQ+ activist, founder of the International Association of LGBT Pride Coordinators InterPride)
- Alec Mapa (actor)
- Del Martin and Phyllis Lyon (lesbian activists)
- Armistead Maupin, author of Tales of the City
- Pat Norman, activist
- Michael Petrelis, AIDS activist
- Jose Sarria (entertainer and activist)
- Bradford Shellhammer, (entrepreneur, co-founder Fab, Bezar and founding editor of Queerty)
- Randy Shilts, (writer and reporter for the San Francisco Chronicle and The Advocate)
- Theresa Sparks (transgender executive director of the San Francisco Human Rights Commission)
- Rikki Streicher (businesswoman, activist, tavern owner, Gay softball promoter, co-founder of the Gay Games)
- Sylvester, singer who began his career in San Francisco
- Michelle Tea, (author of San Francisco lesbian novel Valencia)
- Carol Queen (bisexual author, editor, sociologist and sexologist)
- Adela Vazquez (trans Cuban activist, HIV case manager, Latino AIDS Education and Prevention Program Coordinator)
- Heklina (aka Stefan Grygelko was an actor, drag queen, entrepreneur, activist, owner of The Oasis, theater and cabaret nightclub located in San Francisco's SOMA district and co-founder of Mother (formerly TrannyShack) the longest running drag show in San Francisco)

== See also ==
- Latina lesbian organizations in the United States
- LGBT social movement
- LGBT culture
- LGBT history in Chinatown, San Francisco
- Oasis (San Francisco)

== Bibliography ==
- Boyd, Nan Almilla. Wide-Open Town: A History of Queer San Francisco to 1965. University of California Press, May 23, 2003. ISBN 0520938747, 9780520938748.
- Lipsky, William. Gay and Lesbian San Francisco. Arcadia Publishing, 2006. ISBN 0738531383, 978–0738531380.
- Murray, Stephen O. "Components of Gay Community in San Francisco" (Chapter 4). In: Herdt, Gilbert H. Gay Culture in America: Essays from the Field. Beacon Press, January 1, 1993. ISBN 0807079154, 9780807079157. Start page: 107.
- Ormsbee, Todd J. The Meaning of Gay: Interaction, Publicity, and Community among Homosexual Men in 1960s San Francisco. Lexington Books, July 10, 2012. ISBN 0739144715, 9780739144718.
- Sheiner, Marcy. "The Foundations of the Bisexual Community in San Francisco: An Interview with Dr. Maggi Rubenstein", in the anthology Bi Any Other Name: Bisexual People Speak Out, edited by Lorraine Hutchins and Lani Ka'ahumanu, Alyson Publications, 1991. ISBN 1-55583-174-5, 978–1555831745.
