= LGBTQ history in Chinatown, San Francisco =

Sexuality, including same-sex sexuality, and other non-normative forms of sexuality have been central to the history of Chinatown, San Francisco. San Francisco's Chinatown, founded in 1848, is the first and largest in the United States. San Francisco was shaped by early Chinese immigrants, who came from the Guangdong province of southern China. These immigrants gathered in the Bay Area in order to join in the California Gold Rush and to build railroads in the American West. San Francisco's Chinatown made room for these early Chinese immigrants to live, and the area turned into a "bachelor society", where female prostitution was pervasive because of the Chinese Exclusion Act. As a racialized immigration region, Chinatown was viewed as an immoral place with the characteristics of "vice", "sluttery" and "sexual deviance" for a long time. These traits were incompatible with the mainstream culture and dominant norms of American society. From the mid-19th century, the state problematized Chinese female prostitution with the subject of sexual transmission, and the government began to go against industrial prostitution in Chinatown, as well as Chinese immigration. As the sex industry grew throughout the Bay Area, the government had to stop the anti-prostitution and anti-immigration law in the beginning of the 20th century. Just like the Castro district and other areas, Chinatown developed its own sexual industries and provided a variety of sexual entertainment to both immigrants and white visitors.

The most famous nightclub in the early 20th century was Forbidden City, which combined Orientalism and Western pop-culture to attract numerous guests from all over America. The early queer culture of Chinese immigrants was generated there. Up until the mid-20th century, there were some nightclubs for gay and lesbians in Chinatown, but these were attacked in police raids in the period of the execution of anti-gay laws.

From the 1970s to the 1980s, a number of Asian American gay and lesbian organizations were established in San Francisco. Gay Asian Pacific Alliance is one of the organizations that led the movements for queer Asian Americans to go against racism and sexism. In the following activities, they ran the HIV program for queer people, especially queer people of color. In 1994, the Gay Asian Pacific Alliance and Asian Pacific Sister joined the Chinese New Year Parade, which was the first time that queer Asian American communities had attended in a publicly ethnic activity.

== 19th century ==
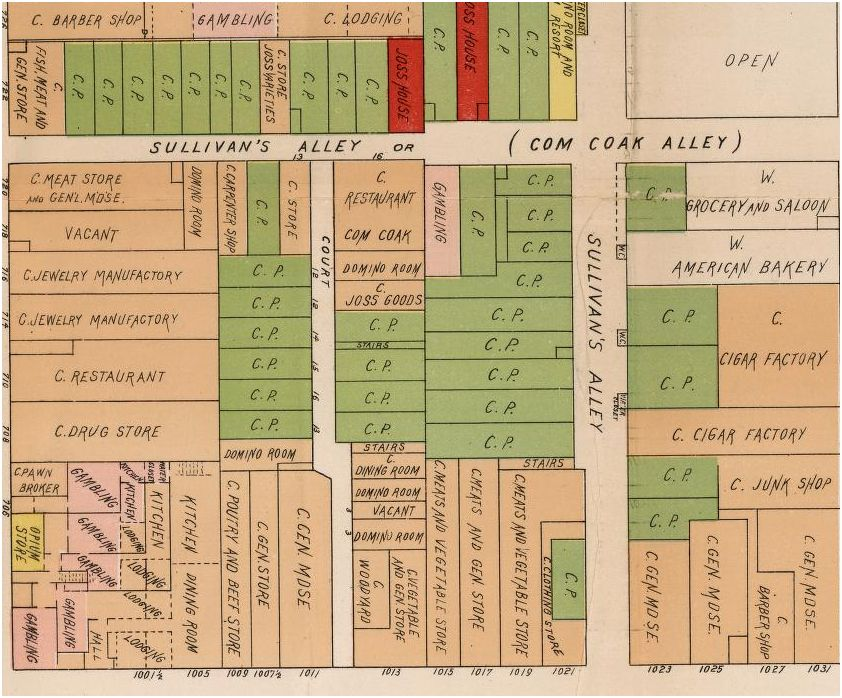
Detailed crop of the half-block bounded by modern-day Pacific, Grant, and Jackson from "Official Map of Chinatown" (1885); areas shaded green denote brothels offering Chinese prostitution (C.P.)

In the first half of the 19th century, the first waves of Chinese immigration were Chinese laborers migrating to the United States, not only to work in the gold mines of California, but also for agricultural jobs and building railroads in the American West. A number of them became traders and entrepreneurs later. However, as Chinese immigrants grew more and more successful, the United States began to strengthen anti-Chinese immigration laws. Consequently, the Chinatown in San Francisco became a "bachelor society", where some female immigrants were driven to be prostitutes. During the late period of the California Gold Rush, a few Chinese female prostitutes began their sexual businesses in Chinatown. In addition, the major prostitution enterprises had been raised by criminal gang group "Tong", importing unmarried Chinese women to San Francisco. During the 1870s to 1880s, the Chinese prostitute population in Chinatown grew rapidly to more than 1,800, accounting for 70% of the total Chinese female population.

In the mid-19th century, police harassment reshaped the urban geography and the social life of Chinese prostitutes. As early as 1854, the main way to solicit for Chinese prostitutes was streetwalking, which forced those prostitutes to be visible in public spaces. Moral reform groups and the police started to single out some visible Chinese prostitutes' on the major streets in Chinatown, such as Dupont Street, recording them as "Five to six feet rooms 'cribs' filthy holes". From 1854 to 1865, San Francisco police conducted campaigns to drive crib prostitutes away from Jackson and Dupont Streets. Consequently, hundreds of Chinese prostitutes were expelled to side streets and alleys hidden from public traffic. By the 1880s, Chinese prostitutes' cribs and brothels were located in the alleys between Jackson and Pacific Streets. In the 1885's, the San Francisco supervisors reported on the greatest concentration of Chinese prostitutes in Chinatown, including Sullivan's Alley, Bartlett Alley and Stout Alley.

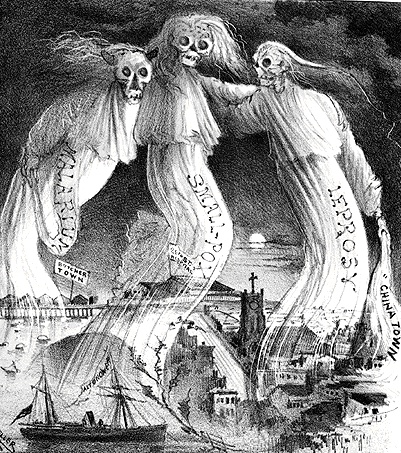
Cartoon reflecting the dominant public opinion that persistent Malarium, Small Pox, and Leprosy were all the fault of the Chinese immigrants and their unsanitary living conditions

In terms of the legal system, from 1870 to 1874, the California legislature formally criminalized the immigrant Asian women who were transported into California. In 1875, the U.S. Congress followed California's action and passed the Page Law, which was the first major legal restriction to prohibit the immigration of Chinese, Japanese, and Mongolian women into America. In 1882, the Chinese Exclusion Act declared that no more skilled or unskilled immigrants would be allowed to enter the country, which meant that many Chinese and Chinese Americans could not have families in America, because their wives and children were prohibited to immigrate. Simultaneously, the public discourse began to accuse Chinese prostitutes of transmitting venereal diseases. In 1876, Dr. Hugh Huger Toland, a member of the San Francisco Board of Health, reported that white boys contracted diseases when they visited "Chinese houses of prostitution" in Chinatown, in order to warn white citizens to stay away from Chinatown.

By the end of the 19th century, Chinatown's assumed reputation as a place of vice caused it to become a tourist destination, attracting numerous working class white people, who sought the oriental mystery of Chinese culture, and sought to fulfill their expectations and fantasies about the filth and depravity. The white customers' patronization of Chinatown prostitutes was more extensive than gambling. After catering for three decades to white people as well as Chinese bachelors, Chinatown's prostitution sector developed into a powerful vested interest, favoring the vice industry. As the tourist industry grew up, the visitors came to include members of the white middle class, which pushed vice businesses to transform into an entertainment industry as a more respectable form in which to serve white customers.

== 20th century ==
=== The first half of the 20th century ===
From the late 19th century to the early 20th century, female-impersonating performers prevailed in San Francisco, including in Chinatown. Chinese female impersonators were common in Chinatown theater. For example, in the early 1890s, Ah Ming, a Chinese female impersonator, had a contract at a theater on Washington Street (near Chinatown) and was making $6,000 a year. Me Chung and Yung Lun were also famous and received high salaries to work for a Chinese theater on Jackson Street.

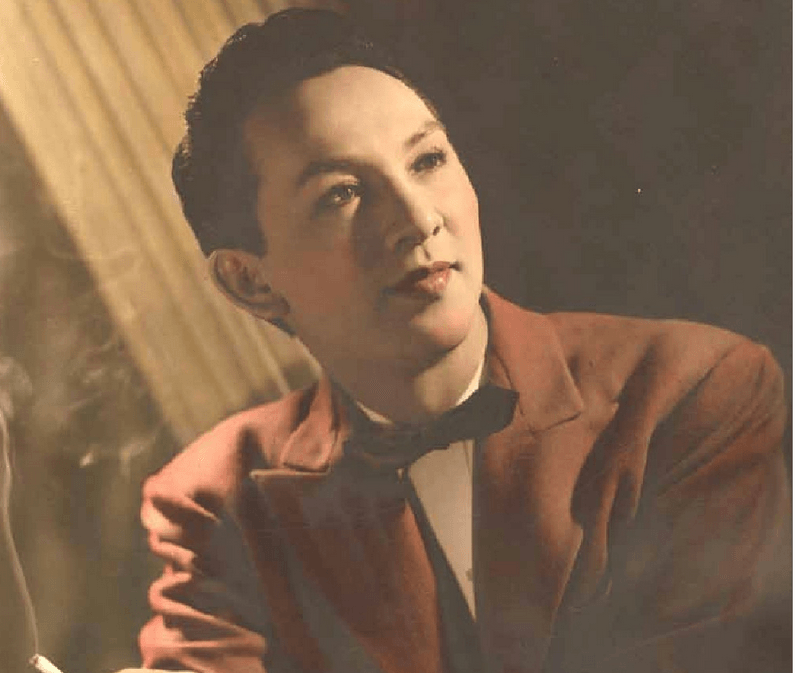
Jackie Mei Ling

In the 1938's, a new nightclub—The Forbidden City, located at 363 Sutter Street in Chinatown, and run by Charlie Low—had become one of the most famous entertainment places in San Francisco. During its time in business from the late 1930s to the late 1950s, the Forbidden City gained an international reputation with its unique showcase of exotic oriental performance from Chinese American performers. It staged a remarkably wide variety of bizarre and motley performances: song-and-dance routines, slapstick, musical duets, solo performances, magic acts, Vaudeville, and even erotic "bubble" and "feather" dancing. These shows explored a new representation of Orientalism, which permitted a queer discourse that differed from the normal, "decent" and dominant white entertainment culture. Meanwhile, it also integrated the Chinese female impersonating performance. Typically, Jackie Mei Ling, a successful dancer and female impersonator, publicly identified himself as a gay man. He is famous for his innovative Oriental dance in various performances. For example, he once played the role of harem master in the show "The Girl in the Gilded Cage", with his flexible body contorting in a series of peculiar postures. The sexualized and racialized performances caused the club to become a spot for sex tourism, attracting LGBT clients from all over the world.

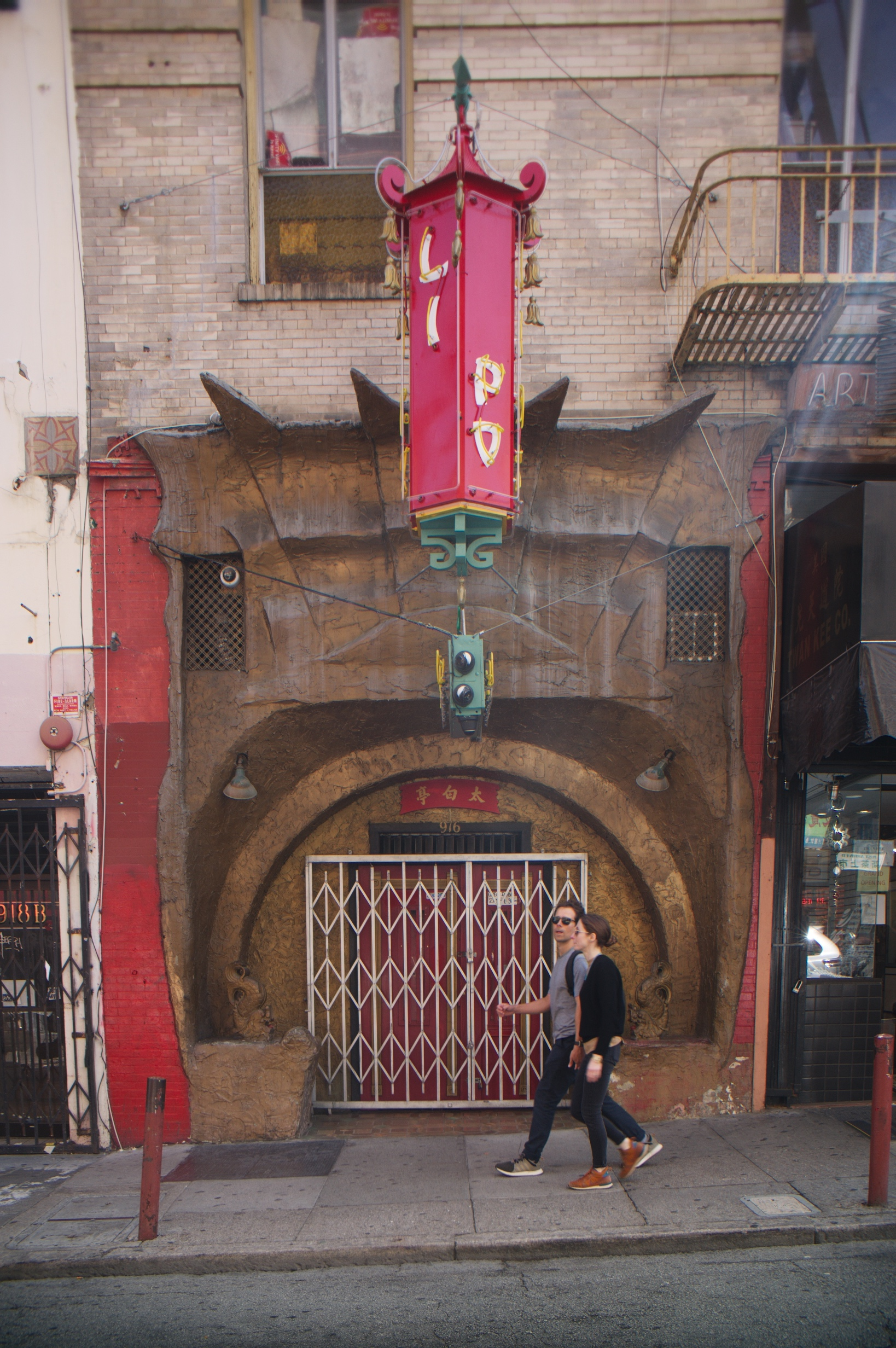
Entrance to Li-Po on Grant Avenue

Another popular club for sex tourism and LGBT clients in Chinatown was Li Po, which, like Forbidden City, combined western entertainment with "Oriental" culture. It was advertised in a 1939 tourism guide book, Where to Sin in San Francisco, with the mark of an exotic cocktail lounge. It is still in operation at 916 Grant Avenue as a discreet gay bar.

During World War II, gay night life in San Francisco went through several waves of crackdown and reorganization. From 1942 to 1943, the San Francisco Moral Drive—consisting of military patrols—carried out a series of raids targeting the gay bars in San Francisco, with the stated aim of protecting servicemen from homosexuals. Chinatown, as one of the places where gay visitors gathered, had also been searched several times. In 1943, Li-Po served as a shelter for those displaced gay customers. However, as the crowd of gay clients and queer sex workers began appearing frequently, the patrols started a second wave of raids. According to the record of one inspector, Jim Kepner, the management of Li-Po refused to admit the large collection of "swishy girls" into the bar, and distanced itself from gay customers in order to prevent a raid.

During the same week, the police raided the gay bar, Rickshaw, near Li-Po, and arrested 24 patrons and two dozen customers, including a couple of lesbians who tried to fight back and triggered a small riot.

=== The second half of the 20th century ===
During the Cold War, the United States government strengthened social control over public spaces to go against queer visibility and solidify the stability of heterosexual families. In this context, Chinatown revived its social normalization within the framework of heterosexual respectable domesticity, in order to emulate mainstream American culture. A number of Chinese-American leaders organized the Chinese New Year Festival parade in Chinatown, including art shows, street dances, martial arts, music, and a fashion show. In 1954, the parade added beauty queens to this annual ritual. By 1958, the group of beauty queens had been formally expanded into the pageant of "Miss Chinatown U.S.A", which became a huge attraction across the country. By emphasizing traditional Confucian gender norms, the New Year parade used the beauty pageant to produce an image of exotic and obedient ethnic womanhood, and to promote gender hierarchy within Chinatown society in order to reverse their image as threatening figures of "sexual and gendered deviance". Consequently, the Asian American queer community had to keep silent in this social-political environment.

Using the national gay liberation movements in the 1970s as a model, queer Asian American communities began their own organization in the late 1970s. Many organizations were located in San Francisco and Bay area, such as the Gay Asian Support Group, the Asian American Feminists, the Asian American Alliance Active, Trikone, the Asian Pacific Sister(APS) and the Gay Asian Pacific Alliance (GAPA). GAPA, one of the queer Asian American organizations, was founded in July 1987. Twelve members from the Berkeley Asian Men's Rap Group at the Pacific Center decided to create a community that provided cultural and political support for queer Asian American people. GAPA created their own newsletter, the Lavender Godzilla, in which the members discussed social issues, such as sexuality, racism and identity politics. The group actively participated in both mainstream activities, e.g. the Pride Parade in San Francisco, and internal activities, e.g. Lunar New Year banquets and the annual Runway pageant. The pageant is a competitive performance for exploring Asian American queers' gender and sexuality. The race (which is still held today) used to elect a Mr. GAPA and a Ms. GAPA (drag queen) is based on 3 criteria: evening-wear, an interview, and fantasy.

In 1994, many queer Asian Americans joined the annual Chinese New Year Parade in Chinatown, San Francisco, which was the first time the Asian American queer community appeared in public and gained acceptance from Chinese-American society. About 120 Asian American queer members marched in the parade, and most came from the Gay Asian Pacific Alliance (GAPA) and the lesbian group Asian Pacific Sisters. While marching, GAPA chose the theme "We Are Your Family" as the title on their banner. They used a carriage to carry Mr. GAPA (in a black suit) and Ms. GAPA (a drag queen wearing a gown). The carriage was based on a model of a pagoda, decorated with lights, tropical plants, and bore a plaque that had the word "Family" written in Chinese calligraphy.

In 2025, local community groups organized one of the world's first Chinatown Pride Festivals which included a procession from Grant Street to Portsmouth Square and a celebration at the Chinese Culture Center.

== See also ==
- Forbidden City (nightclub)
- Timeline of Asian and Pacific Islander Diasporic LGBT History
- LGBT culture in San Francisco
- Castro district, San Francisco
