= Tita Aida =

Social activist

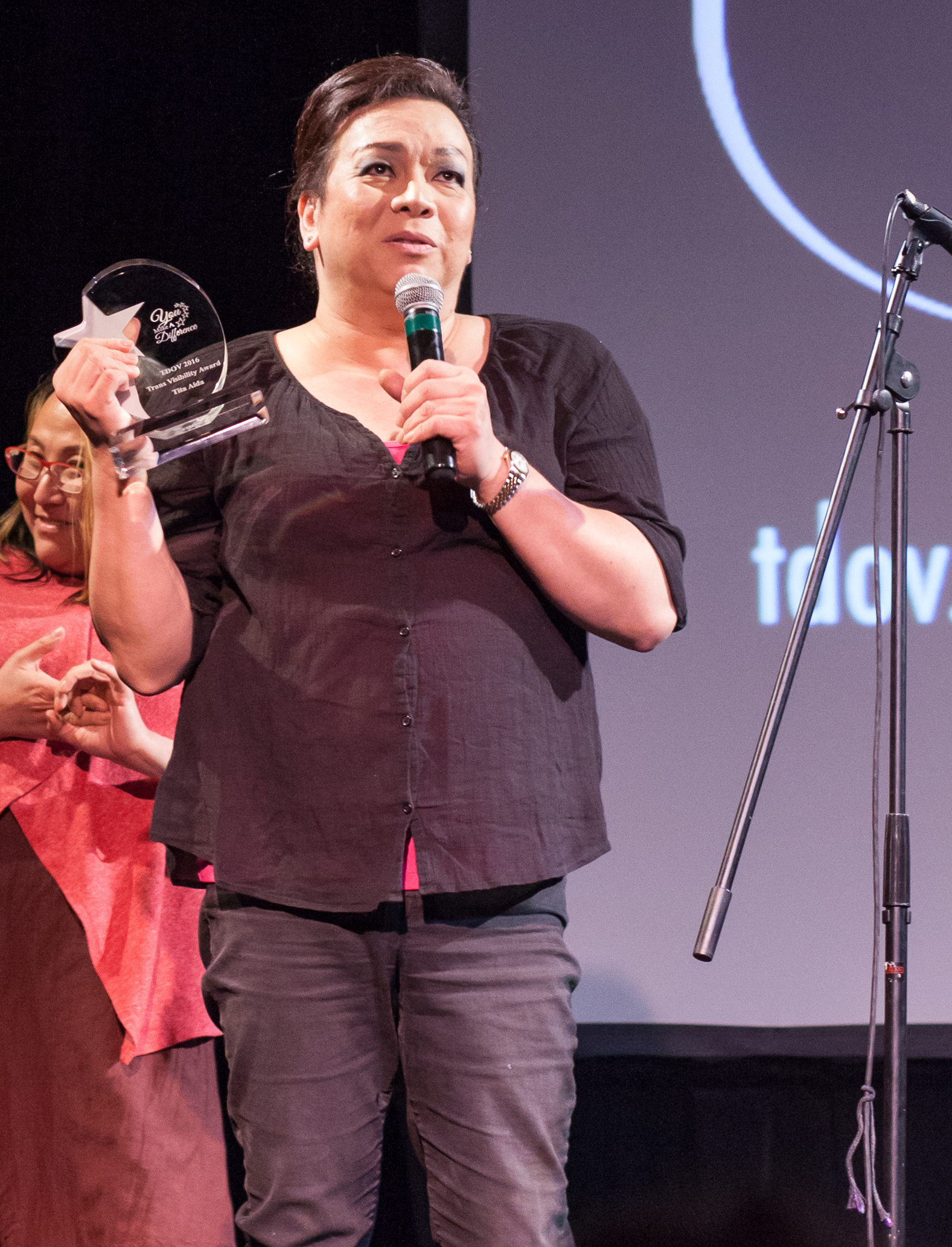
- Tita Aida receives an award at the 2016 Trans Day of Visibility celebration in San Francisco.
- Born: Nikki Calma; Philippines
- Occupation: Director/ Entertainer/Bay Area Local Personality
- Known for: HIV/AIDS & Transgender Activist

Nikki Calma, better known as Tita Aida, is a social activist from San Francisco, California. She is a long-time advocate for HIV/AIDS awareness, particularly among Asian American communities, and for transgender people.

== Name ==
Nikki Calma co-created the persona "Tita Aida" with the Filipino Task Force on AIDS for her role as an auntie, advocate, and HIV/AIDS awareness mentor. "Tita" means "Big sister" in Hawaiian, and it means "Aunt" in Tagalog. "Aida" is a reference to HIV/AIDS.

== Activism ==
Tita Aida was crucial in educating and de-stigmatizing HIV/AIDS in the Asian & Pacific Islander (API) LGBT communities in the early 1990s through her work with the Asian AIDS Project, which became Asian & Pacific Islander Wellness Center and now known as San Francisco Community Health Center in the San Francisco Bay Area.

Tita Aida is active in many transgender initiatives in the United States. She is currently one of the Managing Directors at the organization in which she also oversees and provides the direction over fifteen HIV services and community programs that is very important for San Francisco. Among them is TRANS:THRIVE, a drop-in center in San Francisco, California that caters to and serves the transgender community of the Bay Area. She oversees the program, activities and services offered by the program.

In 2008, Tita Aida was assigned by Mayor Gavin Newsom to be the first transgender female as a commissioner to the Commission on Status of Women in the City of San Francisco in which she was instrumental in educating and providing vital information about the transgender community to the commission and its constituents.

She participated in the "I am Trans March" campaign for the 10th annual Trans March in 2013. She was also featured in the first PSA developed by and aimed at the wellness of the Asian Pacific Islander transgender community as part of the 20th observance of World AIDS Day.

Tita Aida was the subject of a 2012 film, Tita: Still Around, directed by S. Leo Chiang.

For the past ten years, Tita Aida also has taken lead in organizing events such as Trans March SF, Transgender Day of Remembrance, Transgender Day of Visibility, National Transgender HIV Testing Day, API Pride Pavilion and Stage at San Francisco Pride in which these events provide safe spaces for these communities to congregate and flourish.

== Honors and awards ==
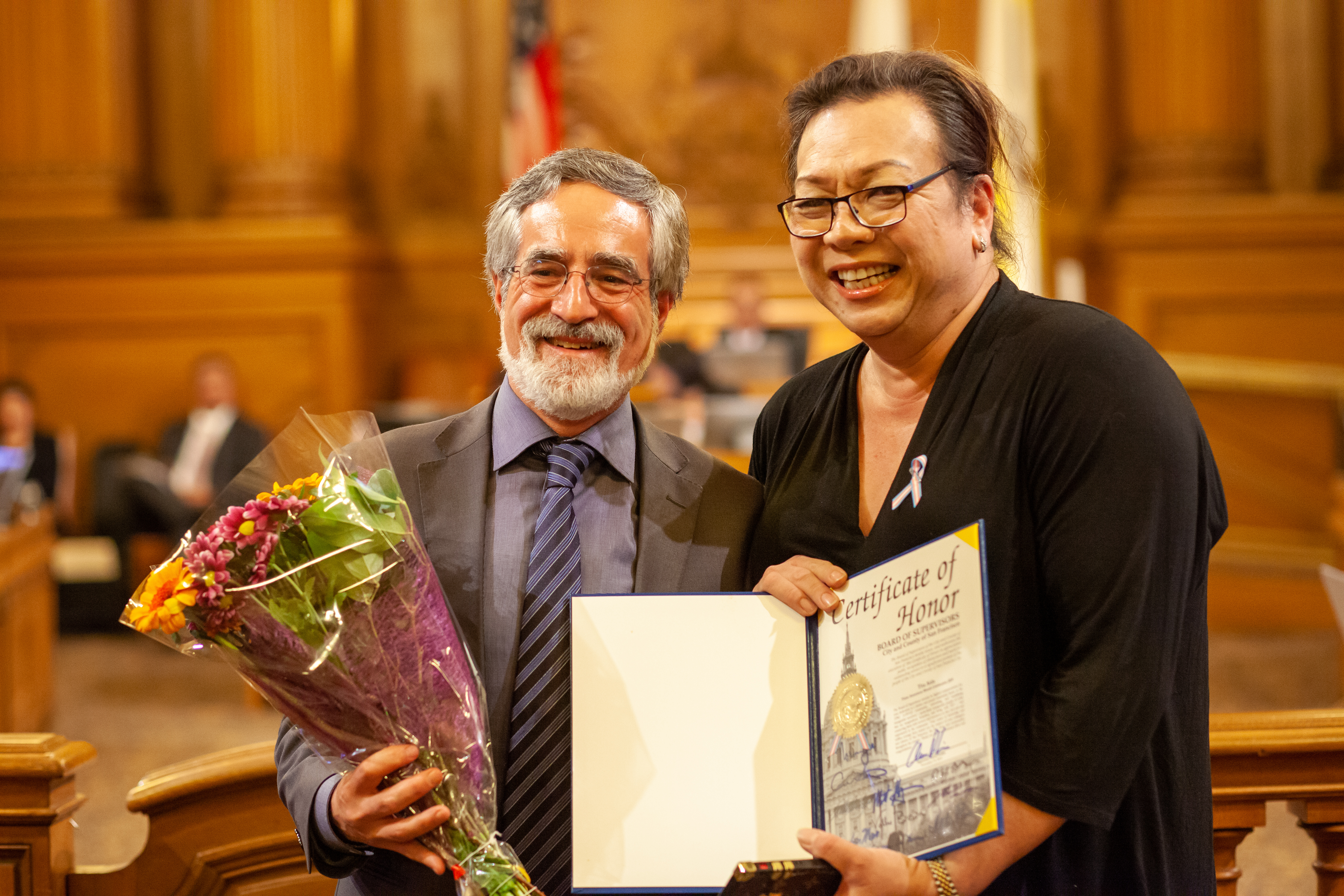
Aida receiving a certificate of honor from San Francisco supervisor Aaron Peskin, November 2019

Tita Aida has been recognized by the various organizations and was given recognition for the following awards: The 2003 GAPA George Choy Community Award, KQED’s Pride Unsung Hero Award, Transgender Law Center's 2010 Claire Skiffington Vanguard Award, Asian & Pacific Islander Wellness Center’s Grassroots Award, and the Harvey Milk LGBT Democratic Club's 2014 Bill Krauss HIV/AIDS Activism Award.

In early 2015, Tita Aida was nominated as a Community Grand Marshal for San Francisco Pride, but was not elected. However, she was chosen to receive the Teddy Witherington Award, an award chosen by SF Pride and by the current City of San Francisco Mayor, recognizing those individuals who have contributed a longstanding, large body of work to the LGBTQ community.

In November 2019, Tita was commended by the San Francisco Board of Supervisors during Transgender Awareness Week.

== Performance ==
Tita Aida is also a member of the "Ladies of Asia SF". Asia SF is a 3-Star Cal-Asian fusion restaurant in the SOMA neighborhood in San Francisco, California. All wait staff are trans women and the group performs for the guests.

Asia SF along with L.A. based production company, World of Wonder Productions, produced their first documentary series, Transcendent, which aired in the summer of 2015 on Fuse Network, featuring the Ladies of Asia SF. Tita was featured in the third and final episode of this first season, and made cameo appearances throughout the second season.

Tita has hosted numerous fundraisers and community events. She was part of the hosting committee for the Transgender Law Center's A Movement in Motion in 2007, TLC 6th Anniversary Event in 2008, co-hosted the TLC 7th Anniversary Event in 2009 with Margaret Cho, and was the Mistress of Ceremonies for its SPARK! event in 2012 and 2013.

She has MC'd for the Asian & Pacific Islander Wellness Center's Annual Spring Benefit, BLOOM, in 2008. She has MC'd for the SF LGBT Center's STUDIO 11 celebration in 2013.

She has also MC'd for the Gay Asian Pacific Alliance (GAPA)'s 20th Anniversary Celebration awards banquet in 2008, and its annual fundraiser, RUNWAY, in 2010, 2011, and 2013

She hosted the Ms. Tang Tang show, which featured a number of Queer API artists, including D’Lo, Mia Nakano and Kit Yan.

Most recently, she has MC'd San Francisco Community Health Center's Pearl Gala in 2018 and 2019.

Tita Aida is also the drag mother and mentor of Asian American drag performer, Estee Longah, who founded the 'Rice Rockettes' all-Asian drag troupe in 2009.
