= Lenn Keller =

American photographer (1951–2020)

- Born: Helen Lenora Keller; September 29, 1951; Evanston, Illinois, US
- Died: December 16, 2020 (aged 69); Oakland, California, US
- Other name: H. Lenn Keller
- Occupations: Photographer, filmmaker, archivist
- Known for: Founder of the Bay Area Lesbian Archives

H. Lenn Keller (September 29, 1951 – December 16, 2020), born Helen Lenora Keller, was an American photographer and filmmaker, based in San Francisco. She was the founder of the Bay Area Lesbian Archives.

== Early life ==
H. Lenn Keller was born in Evanston, Illinois in 1951 (some sources give 1950 as the year), the daughter of a World War II veteran. Her birth name was intended as a reference to the well-known Helen Keller, an association Keller found difficult at times.

Keller's mother died when she was 8 years old from surgery complications. Her grandmother moved in to help her father raise Lenn and her siblings, but died of colon cancer within a year. The children were raised by their father.

She graduated from New Trier High School in suburban Winnetka, where she was one of the few black students in her classes. She later recalled that she "was basically exempted from having to date, because it was at a period in time when white boys didn’t date black girls", and that in a way, "racism saved [her] from compulsory heterosexuality". She moved to New York City in 1969, back to the Chicago area in 1971, and to San Francisco in 1975. In 1984, she earned a bachelor's degree in visual communication at Mills College.

== Career ==
Keller was a photographer and filmmaker documenting diverse queer cultures in San Francisco. Her first short film, Ifé (1993), won an audience award at the 1994 Women's International Film Festival in Madrid. A second short film, Sightings (1995), is a romantic comedy with black lesbian lead characters. She and her work appear in the documentary Gender Troubles: The Butches (2016).

Exhibitions of Keller's work included Gender Warriors, and Fierce Sistahs! (2010, San Francisco Public Library). Her photographs appeared in Aché: A Journal for Black Lesbians, including a self-portrait she contributed for the cover of a 1991 issue. Her work also appears in Bridges. Five of her photographs were included in a major group show, Queer California: Untold Stories (2019), at the Oakland Museum of California.

She co-founded the Bay Area Lesbian Archives in 2014, including her photographs and films, and her collection of community flyers and posters from the 1970s. "This history is very important, not just for posterity, but it’s important for us now," she explained in 2018. Her documentary project, A Persistent Desire remains unfinished. She spoke about its topic and status in a 2012 interview: "The film has been put on hold several times, and I want to complete it in the near future if I can find adequate support. I think the culture of butch-femme is an incredibly important part of lesbian and queer history."

Keller was named the Lifetime Achievement Grand Marshal of the 2020 San Francisco Pride event, which was held online because of the coronavirus pandemic.

== Personal life ==
Keller was the older sister of two brothers, Otis and Broderick. Keller had a daughter, born in July of 1970. In 2007, Keller was diagnosed with Lyme disease. Keller died from cancer at her home in Oakland, California in December 2020, aged 69 years.
