= Vincent Crisostomo =

American HIV/AIDS activist (born 1961)

- Born: 1961 (age 64–65); Tachikawa, Tokyo, Japan
- Occupation: HIV/AIDS activist

Vincent Anthony Crisostomo (born 1961, Tachikawa, Japan) is an HIV AIDS activist from Guam. As of 2022, he was serving as Director of Aging Services at the San Francisco AIDS Foundation (SFAF). Previously, he served as Program Manager of SFAF's Elizabeth Taylor 50-Plus Network at the San Francisco AIDS Foundation.

== Personal life ==
Crisostomo grew up Catholic in a religious Chamorro family. He attended church frequently and was an altar boy as well as a member of the church choir. While the church provided a sense of community, it also promoted intolerance of homosexuality. Eventually, this prompted Crisostomo to leave the church and his home.

Crisostomo himself contracted HIV in 1987 and was diagnosed with HIV the following year, after going to a clinic for what he thought was strep throat. Aged 28 at the time, he was told he likely wouldn't survive to age 30.

Crisostomo is gay. He met his partner, Jesse Solomon, in 1988 in New York City. Solomon was a physical therapist who worked with severely disabled children as well as a personal trainer and yoga teacher. They moved to San Francisco in 1990 and were one of the first 50 same-sex couples to register at the San Francisco City Hall. Solomon died October 6, 1991, of HIV/AIDS.

In 1992, Crisostomo made his HIV status public on World AIDS Day, making him the first openly HIV-positive person to live in the Pacific Islands.

Crisostomo did not initially take medication for his HIV diagnosis, after seeing how early treatments impacted some of his acquaintances. Although he first focused on holistic treatment and nutrition to get through his illnesses, he later began taking medication in 1996 after receiving an AIDS diagnosis in 1995.

== HIV/AIDS Work ==
Crisostomo first learned about HIV/AIDS in December 1983, while living in Japan. When he visited San Francisco in summer 1984, it felt like "a ghost town".

=== Volunteering in New York City ===
Crisostomo began doing HIV AIDS work in 1984, after moving to New York City. One of his jobs was at a bar, where he noticed that many patrons stopped appearing because they were falling sick. He volunteered to do hospital visits for the terminally ill HIV/AIDS patients.

=== GAPA Community HIV Project and Asian AIDS Project ===
In 1992, Crisostomo became an HIV AIDS educator in the Asian Pacific Islanders LGBTQ community through the GAPA Community HIV Project (GCHP) and the Asian AIDS Project, which later merged to become the API Wellness Center.

He continued to travel back to Guam and the Pacific area to provide assistance on HIV AIDS capacity building and service provision.

=== Coral Life Foundation ===
In 2000, Crisostomo moved from San Francisco to Guam to become the executive director of the Coral Life Foundation, a community-based organization working on HIV AIDS in the Asia-Pacific Area. Coral Life Foundation was the first NGO in the area to work on HIV AIDS. In that capacity, Crisostomo convened representatives from the six Pacific Island Jurisdictions which included AIDS directors, program staff, community stakeholders, along with capacity-building assistance providers funded by the Center for Disease Control (CDC) to discuss the state of HIV prevention and care services in their respective jurisdictions. From these discussions PIJAAG was formed to advocate for the provision of quality HIV prevention and care services and to advise national, international, and local policy entities on HIV AIDS issues within the region. Under Crisostomo's leadership, PIJAAG successful advocacy led to a $600,000 increase in the region's HIV Prevention budget, funding of 3 Planning Grants for Care Services and baseline awards for services to those living with HIV.

=== The Coalition of Asia Pacific Regional Networks on HIV/AIDS (7 Sisters) ===
Crisostomo later became the executive director of 7 Sisters, a broad-based alliance of regional Asia Pacific HIV/AIDS networks based in Thailand. He also served as Joint United Nations Programme on HIV/AIDS Asia Pacific NGO Delegate from 2009 to 2010.

=== 50-Plus Network ===
Crisostomo currently facilitates the 50-Plus Network through the San Francisco AIDS Foundation.

== Publications ==
Crisostomo has co-authored two academic papers on HIV AIDS.

- Wong et al. (2011) Development and implementation of a collaborative, multistakeholder research and practice model on HIV prevention targeting Asian/Pacific Islander men in the United States who have sex with men. Am J Public Health Apr 17;101(4):623-31
- Nemoto et al. (2003) HIV risk and prevention among Asian/Pacific Islander men who have sex with men: listen to our stories. AIDS Educ Prev Feb;15(1 Suppl A):7-20
