= San Francisco Community Health Center =

- Founded: 1987
- Type: Nonprofit
- Location: United States
- Region served: San Francisco
- CEO: Lance Toma
- Website: https://sfcommunityhealth.org/
- Formerly called: Asian & Pacific Islander Wellness Center

San Francisco Community Health Center, formerly known as Asian & Pacific Islander Wellness Center and commonly known under that former name as "API Wellness Center", is a United States nonprofit organization headquartered in San Francisco, California. It provides multicultural health services, education, research, and policy organization. Under its former name it initially advocated for Asian & Pacific Islander communities, particularly those in the communities living with HIV. The new name is intended to reflect the availability of services to the larger LGBT community and to the surrounding Tenderloin neighborhood, continuing to include Asians and Pacific Islanders.

== Mission ==
San Francisco Community Health Center's mission is to “transform lives by advancing health, wellness, and equality.”

== History ==
API Wellness Center started in 1987 initially as the Asian AIDS Project (AAP), which provided the first HIV/AIDS services specifically targeted at Asians & Pacific Islanders in North America through outreach and HIV/AIDS prevention education. Vincent Crisostomo was one of the first HIV-AIDS educators in 1992 in the Asian Pacific Islanders LGBTQ community through the GAPA Community HIV Project (GCHP) and the Asian AIDS Project, which later merged to become the API Wellness Center.

In January 2018, the organization was renamed as the San Francisco Community Health Center to reflect its broader focus.
