= GLBTQ+ Asian Pacific Alliance =

American nonprofit organization

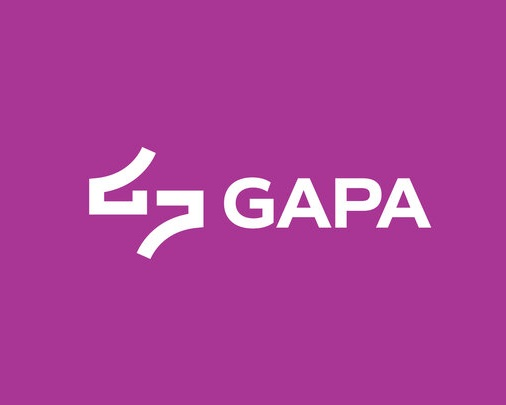
- Formation: 1988; 38 years ago
- Headquarters: San Francisco, CA, U.S.
- Region served: United States
- Chairman: Rowland Mendoza
- Vice Chairman: Jethro Patalinghug
- Secretary: Dino Duazo
- Treasurer: David Tu
- Website: GAPA.org

The GLBTQ+ Asian Pacific Alliance (formerly the Gay Asian Pacific Alliance), sometimes GAPA, is a 501(c)(4) non-profit social welfare organization that was incorporated in February 1988 in San Francisco, California, as a social support group for gay and bisexual Asian Pacific Islander (API) men. It engages in direct social, cultural and political advocacy, with a vision of "a powerful queer and transgender Asian and Pacific-Islander (QTAPI) community that is seen, heard, and celebrated," and a mission "to unite our families and allies to build a community through advocacy, inclusion, and love."

== History ==
Established in 1988 after months of discussion from several members of the Asian Gay Men's Support Group at Berkeley's Pacific Center for Human Growth, GAPA was formed fundamentally to organize, integrate, and nurture a growing gay and bisexual Asian and Pacific Islander (API) identity and to foster positive role models within the community. Since then, GAPA continues as a vanguard for the queer and transgender API community in the San Francisco Bay Area, helping to build institutions like the San Francisco Community Health Center, formerly (until 2018) the API Wellness Center (formed in 1996 by the merger of the Asian AIDS Project [founded in 1987] and the GAPA Community Health Project [founded in 1989]), and GAPA Runway, one of the longest running SF pageants. Over the years, GAPA has produced shows, concerts, conferences, political engagements, rallies, press releases, and banquets, with the goal of directly engaging in social, cultural and political advocacy to advance and protect the QTAPI community's interests and well-being. In 2021, the organization voted to rename itself from the "Gay Asian Pacific Alliance" to the "GLBTQ+ Asian Pacific Alliance".

== GAPA Runway ==
Each year since 1988, GAPA has produced Runway, a campy pageant that crowns the next Mr. and Miss GAPA who act as representatives of GAPA. In 2017, GAPA Runway took place at Herbst Theatre while a small collection of white supremacists was being run out of San Francisco. From 2010 until 2019, Runway was hosted and produced by the GAPA Foundation, rebranded in 2020 as the Prism Foundation, a separate 501(c)(3) non-profit organization that empowers the Asian/Pacific Islander LGBTQ community by providing financial assistance to API LGBTQ students applying to or currently attending post-secondary institutions and providing core funding to under-resourced and under-represented San Francisco Bay Area community organizations and projects. Since then, GAPA has resumed hosting and producing Runway; due to COVID-19 health restrictions, this will be a virtual event in 2020.

== GAPA Men's Chorus ==
In 1989, the GAPA Men's Chorus was founded as a social and musical outlet for members. In November 2015, the GAPA Men's Chorus participated in "Hand in Hand Taipei," the first pan-Asian LGBT choir festival, in April 2019 in "Hand in Hand Tokyo," and in June 2025 in "Hand in Hand Singapore, sponsored by Proud Voices Asia LGBT choir network. In December 2016, the chorus was invited to sing the national anthem at Oracle Arena in Oakland, California, for the Golden State Warriors. The GAPA Men's Chorus has been led by music director, Randall Kikukawa, since 1991, and has been a member of GALA Choruses (Gay and Lesbian Association of Choruses) since 1999. Since September 2019, GAPA Men's Chorus has also operated under the GAPA Fund, a separate 501(c)(3) non-profit organization focused on funding cultural activities and the arts. The late Mayor Ed Lee proclaimed May 15, 2015, Gay Asian Pacific Alliance Men's Chorus Day in San Francisco on the occasion of the chorus' 25th anniversary concert.

== GAPA Theatre ==
GAPA Theatre provides queer and transgender Asian and Pacific Islander men a place to tell their stories and, in doing so, to reach out for support, express their desires, respond to the social, cultural, sexual, and political discourse, or to simply be and feel heard. GAPA Theatre members attempt to connect more deeply with themselves, and in turn, connect more deeply with others and their community.

== GAPA Social ==
GAPA Social provides social events for members, including volleyball, hiking, and TGIF (Thank GAPA It's Friday) happy hours, among other events.

== GAPA PAC ==
GAPA PAC is a political action committee, sponsored by GAPA to provide monetary contributions in elections and other politically centered events. GAPA PAC provides scholarships to encourage up and coming leaders in the community to gain skills needed to serve publicly or win campaigns, makes election endorsements, and mobilizes members to come out and vote.

== Other activities ==
In 1994, GAPA participated in the Chinese New Year Parade in San Francisco's Chinatown District, wearing sweatshirts with the phrase "We are one family" written in Chinese. Members of GAPA carried a 25-foot lavender Godzilla.

Former GAPA Chair Michael Nguyen explains how GAPA's purpose has broadened to advocate for anyone within the LGBTQ API community in the Bay Area.

On March 21, 2021, in response to the mass murders of Asian women in massage parlors in the Atlanta area and in response to the ongoing violence against Asian lives in the Bay Area, GAPA organized an LGBTQ Solidarity March for Asian Lives from the Castro to Chinatown.

On May 18, 2021, the San Francisco Board of Supervisors adopted a resolution officially declaring May 22–29, 2021, the nation's first QTAPI (Queer Transgender Asian Pacific Islander) Week in the City and County of San Francisco. Former GAPA Chair Michael Nguyen, co-founder of the Bay Area QTAPI Coalition in 2017, was the lead organizer of the week-long series of live and virtual events.

== Affiliations ==
- GAPA Men's Chorus
- GAPA Fund
- Prism Foundation (formerly GAPA Foundation)
- GALA Choruses (Gay and Lesbian Association of Choruses)
