= List of LGBTQ-related films of 1993 =

This is a list of lesbian, gay, bisexual, transgender or queer-related films released in 1993. It contains theatrically released films that deal with important gay, lesbian, bisexual, transgender or queer characters or issues and may have same-sex romance or relationships as a plot device.

== Films ==
Title	Director	Country	Genre	Cast	Notes
And the Band Played On	Roger Spottiswoode	United States	Drama	Matthew Modine, Alan Alda, Ian McKellen, Glenne Headly, Richard Masur, Saul Rubinek, Lily Tomlin, Jeffrey Nordling, Donal Logue, B. D. Wong, Patrick Bauchau, Nathalie Baye, Phil Collins, Steve Martin, Richard Gere, David Marshall Grant, Ronald Guttman, Anjelica Huston, Ken Jenkins, Richard Jenkins, Tchéky Karyo, Peter McRobbie, Charles Martin Smith, Christian Clemenson, Rosemary Murphy, Stephen Spinella, David Clennon, Swoosie Kurtz and Lawrence Monoson	Based on non-fiction book of the same name by Randy Shilts
Anthem	Marlon Riggs	United States	Short	Bernard Branner, Brian Freeman, Jesse Harris, David Kirkland, Willi Ninja, Tim Riera, Marlon T. Riggs and The Bella Boys	
Belle	Irma Achten	Netherlands	Romance	Wivineke van Groningen, Nelleke Zitman, Rosa Herzberg, Ulf-Maria Kuehne, Reinout Bussemaker, Do van Stek, Wim de Haas, Guusje van Tilborgh, Peter Noland, Corina Van Eijk, Rita Veth, Ilse Roest, Ilse Vocking, Coos van Eijk and Pamela Teves	
Boys' Shorts: The New Queer Cinema	Mark Christopher, Stephen Cummins, Laurie Lynd, Michael Mayson, Chris Newby, Marlon Riggs	United Kingdom; Canada; Australia; United States	Drama		Six short gay films about general aspects of gay life
Blue	Derek Jarman	United Kingdom	Drama	John Quentin, Nigel Terry, Derek Jarman and Tilda Swinton	Jarman's final film; he died of AIDS-related complications four months after its release
Cap Tourmente	Michel Langlois	Canada	Drama	Roy Dupuis, Élise Guilbault	
Desperate Remedies	Stewart Main, Peter Wells	New Zealand	Drama	Jennifer Ward-Lealand, Kevin Smith, Lisa Chappell, Cliff Curtis, Michael Hurst, Kiri Mills, Bridget Armstrong, Timothy Raby, Helen Steemson and Geeling Ng	
Dönersen Islık Çal	Orhan Oğuz	Turkey	Drama	Derya Alabora, Mevlüt Demiryay, Fikret Kuskan and Menderes Samancilar	a.k.a. Whistle If You Come Back
Even Cowgirls Get the Blues	Gus Van Sant	United States	Romance, comedy, drama	Tom Robbins (narrator), Uma Thurman, Treva Jeffryes, Lorraine Bracco, Angie Dickinson, Noriyuki "Pat" Morita, Keanu Reeves, John Hurt, Rain Phoenix, Roseanne Arnold, Ed Begley Jr., Crispin Glover, Buck Henry, Carol Kane, Sean Young, Victoria Williams, Grace Zabriskie, Ken Kesey, Heather Graham, Udo Kier, Lin Shaye, William Burroughs, Edward James Olmos and River Phoenix	Based on Robbins' novel of the same name
Farewell My Concubine	Kaige Chen	China; Hong Kong	Romantic, drama	Leslie Cheung, Zhang Fengyi, Gong Li, Ge You, Lü Qi, Ying Da, Yidi, Zhi Yitong, Lei Han, Li Dan and Wu Dai-wai	
Feed Them to the Cannibals!	Fiona Cunningham-Reid	Australia	Documentary		History of the Sydney Gay and Lesbian Mardi Gras
Frank's Cock	Mike Hoolboom	Canada	Short	Callum Keith Rennie	
Gece, Melek ve Bizim Çocuklar	Atıf Yılmaz	Turkey	Drama	Derya Arbas, Deniz Türkali, Uzay Hepari, Deniz Atamtürk, Kaan Girgin, Mehmet Teoman, Mustafa Suphi, Candan Erçetin, Ceylan Çapli, Cengiz Sezici, Nurettin Sen, Ayten Uncuoglu, Bennu Yildirimlar, Serdar Bostanci (credited as Serdar Bordanaci) and Ceyhan Firat	aka The Night, Angel and Our Children
Greetings from Out Here	Ellen Spiro	United States	Documentary		
Grief	Richard Glatzer	United States	Comedy	Craig Chester, Kent Fuher (also as Jackie Beat), Illeana Douglas, Alexis Arquette, Carlton Wilborn, Lucy Gutteridge, Robin Swid, William L. Rotko (credited as Bill Rotko), Shawn Hoffman, Frank Rehwaldt, Greg Bennett, Mickey Cottrell, Katherine Connella (credited as Catherine Connella), Mary Woronov and Mauri Bernstein	
I Killed My Lesbian Wife, Hung Her on a Meat Hook, and Now I Have a Three-Picture Deal at Disney	Ben Affleck	United States	Short, satire	Jay Lacopo, Karla Montana	Affleck's directorial debut
Kika	Pedro Almodóvar	Spain; France	Drama, comedy	Verónica Forqué, Peter Coyote, Victoria Abril, Àlex Casanovas (credited as Àlex Casanova), Rossy de Palma (credited as Rossy de Palma), Santiago Lajusticia, Anabel Alonso, Bibiana Fernández (credited as Bibí Andersen), Jesús Bonilla, Karra Elejalde, Manuel Bandera, Charo López, Francisca Caballero, Mónica Bardem, Joaquín Climent, Blanca Li and Claudia Aros	
Last Call at Maud's	Paris Poirier	United States	Documentary	Rikki Streicher, Gwenn Craig, Jo Daly, Sally Gearhart, Judy Grahn, Joann Shirley, Del Martin and Phyllis Lyon	About Maud's, a San Francisco lesbian bar which closed in 1989 after 23 years in business
Love and Human Remains	Denys Arcand	Canada	Drama	Thomas Gibson, Ruth Marshall, Cameron Bancroft, Mia Kirshner, Joanne Vannicola, Matthew Ferguson and Aidan Devine	Screenplay by Brad Fraser, based on his stage play Unidentified Human Remains and the True Nature of Love
M. Butterfly	David Cronenberg	United States	Romance, drama	Jeremy Irons, John Lone, Barbara Sukowa	Screenplay by David Henry Hwang, based on his stage play of the same name
Mrs. Doubtfire	Chris Columbus	United States	Comedy	Robin Williams, Sally Field, Pierce Brosnan, Harvey Fierstein, Robert Prosky	
One Nation Under God	Teodoro Maniaci, Francine Rzeznik	United States	Documentary		This film is about how lesbians and gay men try to become "ex-gay".
Paris, France	Jerry Ciccoritti	Canada	Erotic drama	Leslie Hope, Peter Outerbridge, Dan Lett	
Philadelphia	Jonathan Demme	United States	Drama	Tom Hanks, Denzel Washington, Jason Robards, Mary Steenburgen, Antonio Banderas, Joanne Woodward, Robert W. Castle, Ann Dowd, Charles Napier, Roberta Maxwell, Karen Finley, Robert Ridgely, Bradley Whitford, Ron Vawter and Anna Deavere Smith	
Prinz in Hölleland	Michael Stock	Germany	Drama	Wolfram Haack, Stefan Laarmann (credited as Stefan Laarmannn), Michael Stock, Andreas Stadler, Nils-Leevke Schmidt, Simone Spengler, Harry Baer, Alexander Schröder, Olivier Picot, Henry Fenrich, Dirk Ludigs, Stefan Bielefeld, Marius Zekri, Else Elsterhof and Susanne Held	aka Prince in Hell
Sex Is...	Marc Huestis	United States	Documentary		Interviews with 15 gay men, living in or near San Francisco.
The Sex of the Stars	Paule Baillargeon	Canada	Drama	Marianne Coquelicot Mercier, Denis Mercier, Tobie Pelletier, Sylvie Drapeau, Luc Picard, Gilles Renaud and Jean-René Ouellet	
Silverlake Life: The View from Here	Peter Friedman, Tom Joslin	United States	Documentary	Tom Joslin and Mark Massi	It shared the 1993 Grand Jury Prize at the Sundance Film Festival with the film Children of Fate: Life and Death in a Sicilian Family.
Six Degrees of Separation	Fred Schepisi	United States	Drama, mystery	Stockard Channing, Will Smith, Donald Sutherland, Ian McKellen, Mary Beth Hurt, Heather Graham, Bruce Davison, Richard Masur, Anthony Michael Hall, Eric Thal, Anthony Rapp, Oz Perkins (credited as Osgood Perkins II), Catherine Kellner, J. J. Abrams (credited as Jeffrey Abrams) and Kitty Carlisle	Screenplay by John Guare, based on his stage play of the same name
Three of Hearts	Yurek Bogayevicz	United States	Romance, comedy	William Baldwin, Kelly Lynch, Sherilyn Fenn, Joe Pantoliano, Cec Verrell, Claire Callaway, Marek Johnson, Monique Mannen, Timothy Stickney, Frank Ray Perilli, Tony Amendola, Keith MacKechnie, Ann Ryerson and Gloria Gifford	
Todos a la cárcel	Luis García Berlanga	Spain	Comedy	José Sazatornil, José Sacristán, Agustín González, Manuel Alexandre, Rafael Alonso, Inocencio Arias, José Luis Borau, Gaspar Cano, Luis Ciges, Joaquín Climent, Marta Fernández Muro. Juan Luis Galiardo, Antonio Gamero, Chus Lampreave and Eusebio Lázaro	aka Everyone Off to Jail
A Touch of Fever	Ryōsuke Hashiguchi	Japan	Romance, drama	Yoshihiko Hakamada, Reiko Kataoka, Masashi Endô, Sumiyo Yamada, Kôji Satô, Bunmei Harada, Kôta Kusano, Yôichi Kawaguchi, Hiroshi Ohkôchi, Tarô Ishida and Wakaba Irie	aka Hatachi No Binetsu
Totally Fucked Up	Gregg Araki	United States	Drama	James Duval, Roko Belic, Susan Behshid, Jenee Gill, Gilbert Luna, Lance May, Alan Boyce, Craig Gilmore and Nicole Dillenberg	
Verzaubert	Jörg Fockele, Jens Golombek, Dirk Hauska, Sylke Jehna, Claudia Kaltenbach, Ulrich Prehn, Johanna Reutter, Katrin Schmersahl, Dorothee Van Diepenbroick	Germany	Documentary		Stories of 12 gay and lesbian survivors of the Holocaust and German Fascism
The Wedding Banquet	Ang Lee	Taiwan; United States	Romance, comedy, drama	Winston Chao, Gua Ah-leh, Sihung Lung, May Chin, Mitchell Lichtenstein, Vanessa Yang, Dion Birney, Jeanne Kuo Chang, Michael Gaston and Ang Lee	
Wittgenstein	Derek Jarman	Japan; United Kingdom	Drama	Clancy Chassay, Karl Johnson, Nabil Shaban, Michael Gough, Tilda Swinton, John Quentin, Kevin Collins and Lynn Seymour	Based on the life story of philosopher Ludwig Wittgenstein
Zero Patience	John Greyson	United Kingdom; Canada	Musical	John Robinson, Normand Fauteux, Dianne Heatherington, Richardo Keens-Douglas, Charlotte Boisjoli, Brenda Kamino, Michael Callen, Marla Lukofsky, Von Flores, Scott Hurst and Duncan McIntosh	Examines and refutes the urban legend of the alleged introduction of HIV to North America by Gaëtan Dugas
