= Mona's 440 Club =

Former lesbian bar in San Francisco, California, US

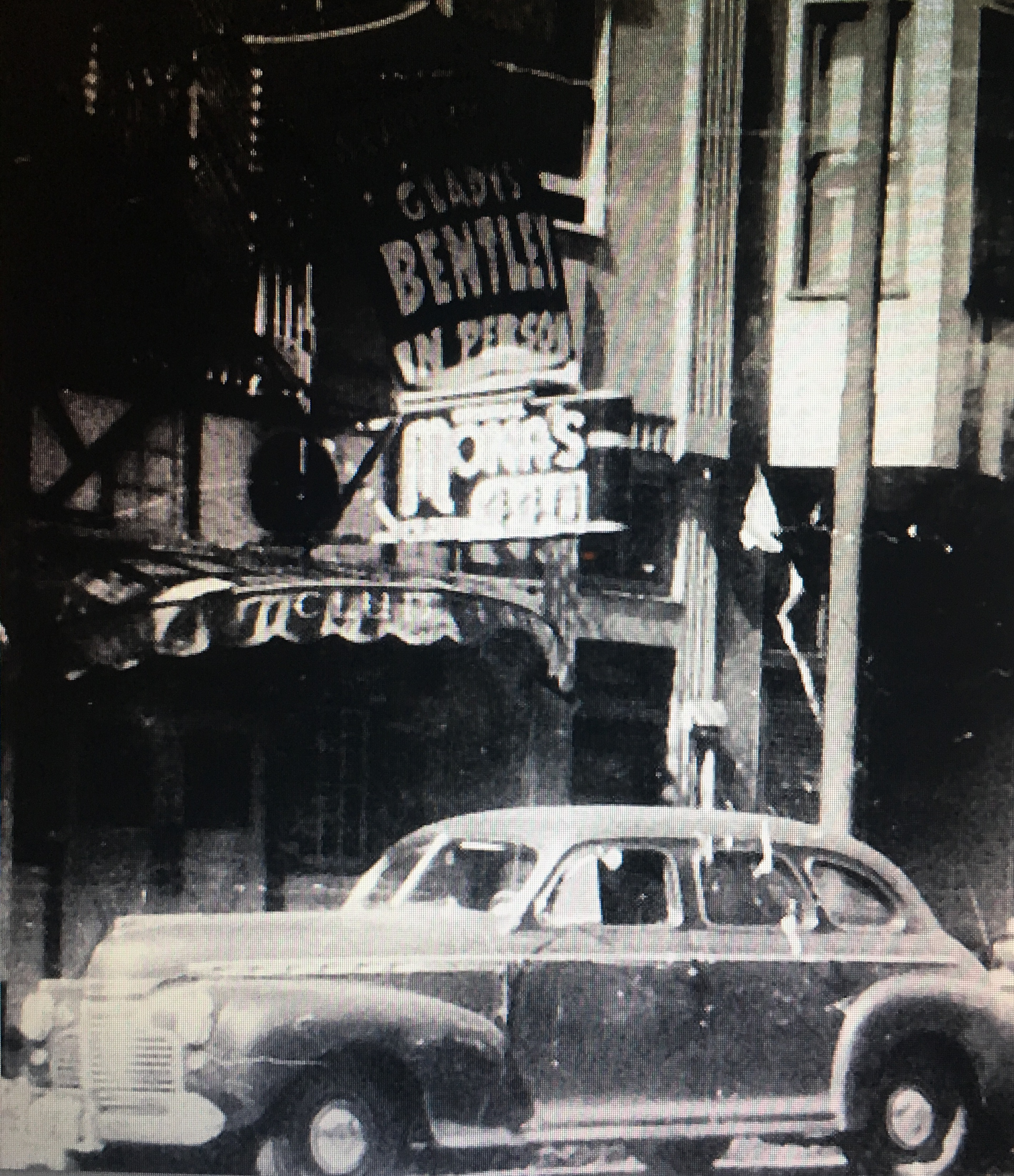
- Marquee at Mona's 440 Club for Gladys Bentley in North Beach, San Francisco
- Interactive map of Mona's 440 Club
- Location: San Francisco, California, U.S.
- Coordinates: 37.79843991590179°N 122.40465148049657°W
- Type: Lesbian bar

Construction
- Opened: 1936
- Closed: 1950s

Mona's 440 Club was the first lesbian bar to open in San Francisco, California in 1936. It continued to draw a lesbian clientele into the 1950s. Mona's and the gay bars of that era were an important part of the history of LGBT culture in San Francisco.

== Mona's ==
=== Union Street, Columbus Avenue ===
Mona and Jimmie Sargeant, a married couple, opened Mona's in 1934 on Union Street, taking advantage of San Francisco's liberal attitude, endless supply of tourists, and the end of prohibition. In 1936, the couple moved the bar to a basement location on Columbus Avenue in North Beach. Originally, the couple imagined the club as a bohemian hangout for writers and artists. They covered the floors with sawdust to help create the "bohemian" atmosphere.

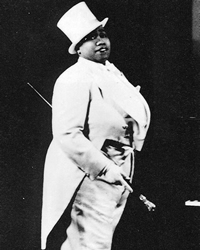
Gladys Bentley was a frequent entertainer at Mona's

Over the time, the vision of the club changed. The couple hired singing waitresses, and some of the female waitresses dressed in male drag. The bar became modeled after other successful female impersonation or drag clubs like Finnochio's. In 1936, the San Francisco Chronicle published a "Cocktailing, Dancing, and Dining." In the guide, Mona's was described as a "bohemian" club, which was a coded way of describing it as sexually unconventional. The bar became the first openly lesbian club that was geared towards the local gay community as opposed to gay tourists. Mona's marketed itself as a place "where girls can be boys" and featured female wait staff and entertainers dressed in tuxedos.

Similar to many other lesbian and gay bar owners, Mona was arrested under the premise of keeping a "disorderly house". Military servicemen were patrons to these bars as well, but Prohibition and queer-mongering worried them and kept them from attending the well-known gay spaces in San Francisco.

=== 440 Broadway ===
Due to its popularity and growth in patronage, the bar moved to 440 Broadway Street in North Beach and was subsequently renamed Mona's 440 Club. The new space quickly became popular with both straight and gay patrons, including straight women looking to relax and unwind and tourists looking for a show. Mona's 440 Club was considered to be a part of the San Francisco sex tourism culture, however the bar stuck to cross-dressing in order to remain lawful. During World War II the bar attracted women that were left at home who were looking for entertainment and the company of other women, friendly and romantic. In its later days, the bar also attracted servicemen on leave. These servicemen were also experiencing for the first time the risk of being discharged for homosexual behaviors during the time of the Great War.

In 1941, Mona relinquished control of the club to new manager, Babe Scott. Babe Scott was known as "the woman who plays baseball like a veteran." Scott's legacy was the performers she brought to the club.

== Entertainment ==
One of the biggest draws to Mona's was their large variety of in house entertainment. Kay Scott and Babe Scott were part of the original group of entertainers to perform at Mona's 440 Club and due to their performances they became local San Francisco celebrities. The popularity of the performers drew in others who also wanted some of the same recognition.

After taking control of the bar Babe Scott booked performers such as Tina Rubio, Gladys Bentley, Frances Faye, Midge Williams, Moms Mabley and Beverly Shaw, the latter of whom became one of the club's headlining acts before moving to the Chi Chi Club across the street. Bentley remained one of Mona's most long running and popular residents due to her talent. She was a key part of Mona's culture with her cross-dressing performance, as well as her ability to fit in with the growing popularity of sex and race tourism post prohibition. Bentley was recognized for her performances wearing a tuxedo and top hat. Eventually, she moved to Los Angeles to continue her career.

== Ann's 440 Club ==
Once Mona sold the club, entertainer Ann Dee (Angela Maria DeSpirito, 1919–2005), took over Mona's 440 Club in the mid 1950s and completely changed the direction of the club — starting with a new name, Ann's 440 Club. While the club still employed lesbian waitstaff and had lesbian clientele, its main focus was no longer on the queer culture and woman empowerment, but more focused on entertainment. Ann Dee wanted a place to be able to showcase her talents when she so desired and booked performers that fit her preferences. While under Ann Dee's ownership, the club gave Johnny Mathis his start.

== Legacy ==
Since its launch, Mona's became one of the most popular lesbian bars in the United States and its popularity helped pave the way for more lesbian bars to open in the same neighborhood, making it a "well-known lesbian enclave". As the most recent example, San Francisco has seen its first lesbian sports bar — Rikki's — in the Summer of 2025, long after the closing of Mona's 440 Club over half a century prior. The bar is named after Rikki Streicher, a fellow bar owner of another iconic lesbian bar, Maud's, in San Francisco. While a spike in lesbian bars was observed across the United States after Mona's opening, due to the 2020 pandemic, which compromised many socially reliant businesses and the lack of financial stability to maintain them, there was a significant decrease in sapphic-centered bars.

Despite seeing a fluctuation in operating brick-and-mortar lesbian bars across the United States, they maintain a significantly smaller number of running locations than gay bars. In 2021, there were approximately 21 lesbian bars servicing the entire United States. As of December 2025, there are 36 up and running lesbian bars across the United States, spanning 17 states and Washington, District of Columbia. Four of these bars (Jolene, Mother, Scarlet Fox Wine Bar, and Wild Side West) are located in San Francisco, where Mona's first opened. The Lesbian Bar Project continues to monitor lesbian bars and promotes their unique locations so that, like Mona's, they can be accessed by the lesbian/sapphic community.

== See also ==
- The Lexington Club - Also known to locals as The Lex, this was the longest-standing lesbian bar from its opening in 1997 and its closing in 2015. Due to increased rent prices and a decline of LGBT clientele in its residing Mission District area, the historic San Francisco landmark closed its doors indefinitely and was sold out for a bar now called Wildhawk. The change has received mixed reactions from local clientele.
- Maud's - At the time of its closing, Maud's was the longest-operated lesbian bar. Such was the impact of the news announcing its closing, that from it came the documentary film, "Last Call At Maud's". Also located in San Francisco, the 23-year business was opened by Rikki Streicher, a San Francisco queer rights activist. Maud's was opened at a time where women could not be hired as bartenders, but still the sapphic space became home for many locals.
- Peg's Place - Located in 4737 Geary Boulevard, it was known historically for having experienced one of the most tragic lesbophobic assaults to a sapphic space. The incident took place in 1979 from off-duty members of a San Francisco vice squad, which propelled attention and rallying against ongoing police harassment and anti-gay violence. This anger would soon after be reignited, following the failure to convict Harvey Milk's assassin on murder charges.
- Wild Side West - Still open in 2025, San Francisco's Wild Side West bar stands as one of the longest-running lesbian bars in the United States, despite having taken a significant hit in fiscal affairs during the 2020 pandemic. The Wild Side West has been continuously open since 1962.
