= San Francisco in the 1970s =

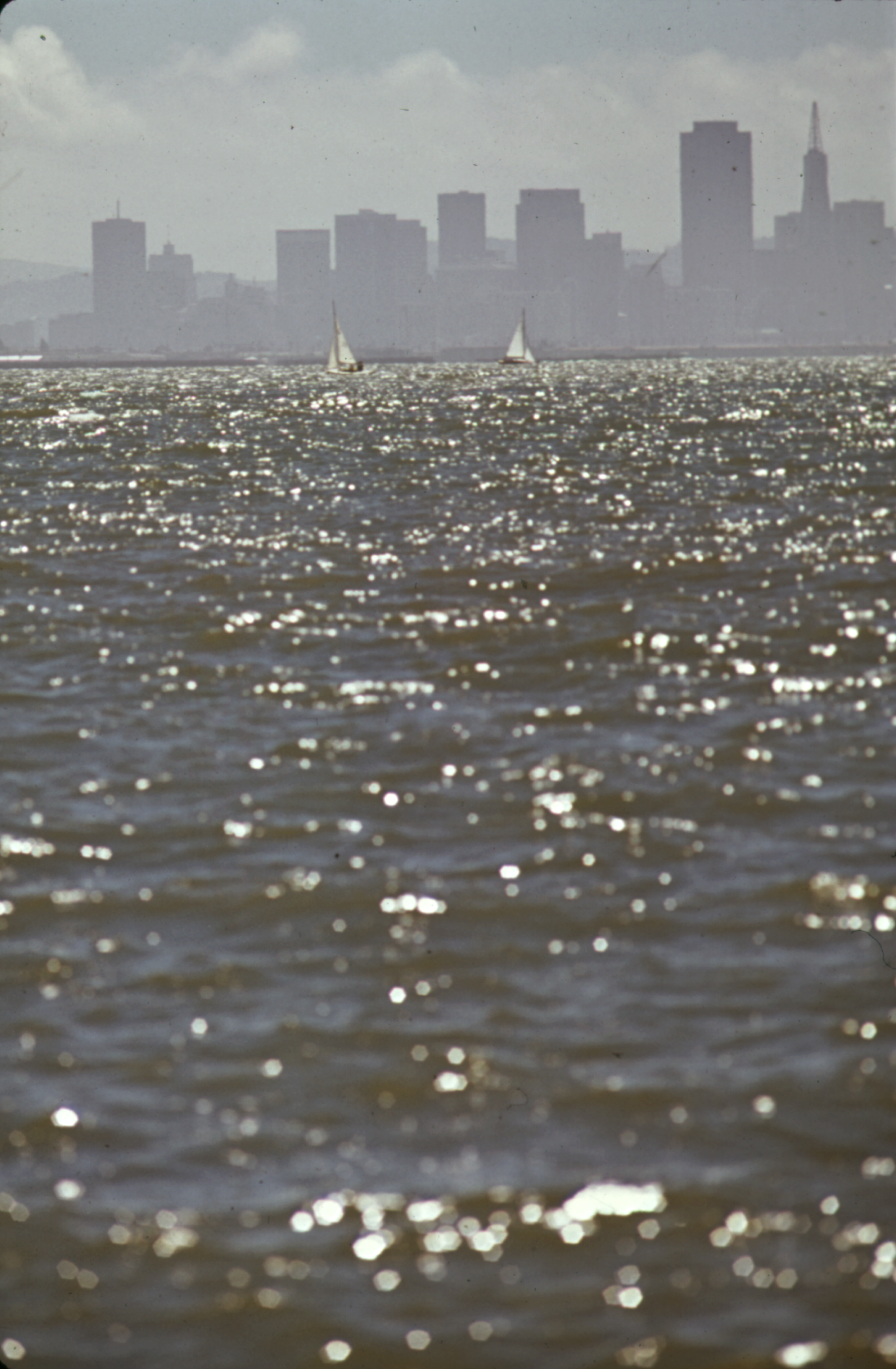
San Francisco Bay, August 1972

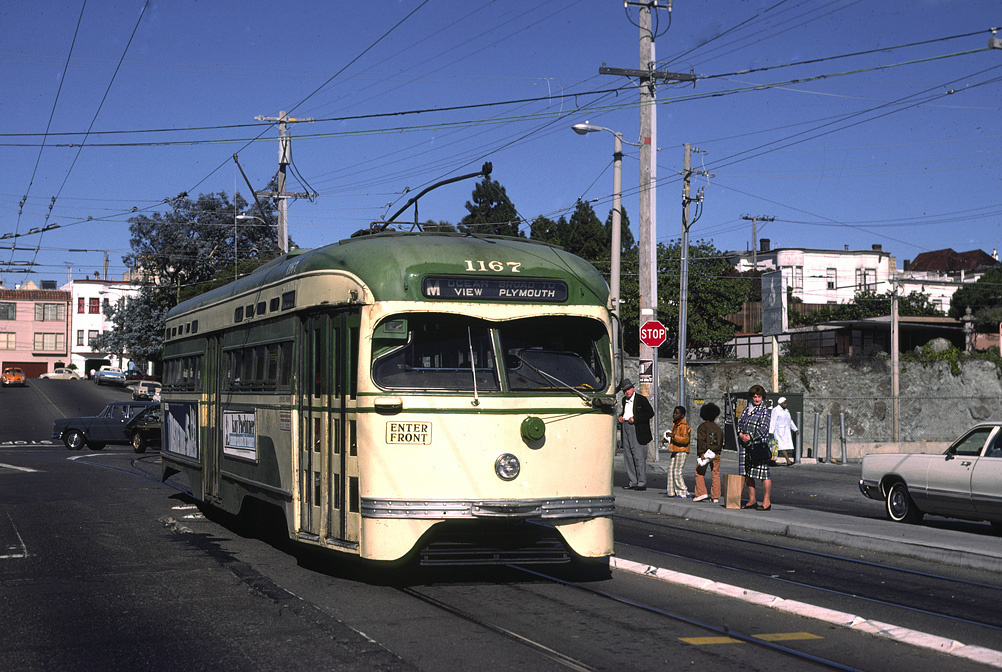
San Francisco PCC-type streetcar 1167 southbound on Church Street

San Francisco in the 1970s was a global hub of culture. San Francisco was known worldwide for hippies and radicals. The city was heavily affected by drugs, prostitution and crime. Outcasts and the socially marginalized were attracted by a greater tolerance and acceptance of diverse cultures in the city. It grew as one of world's biggest centers for the LGBT community and LGBT rights. The rock music known as the San Francisco Sound was performed live and recorded by San Francisco-based rock groups of the mid-1960s to early 1970s. It was associated with the counterculture community in the city at the time.

San Francisco was the cradle of the pornography industry in the United States in the 1970s, and led to a dramatic growth of strip clubs, adult movie theaters, "peep show" booths, and sex shops downtown, as well as to the creation of the first feminist advocacy groups for sex workers. Many skyscrapers were built in the city during this period. The city is also associated with West Coast jazz and was one of the major centers of jazz fusion which took off in the 1970s. Many American detective/crime television series were shot in San Francisco in the 1970s and the city became well known as a backdrop to police films such as Dirty Harry (1971).

== 1970–71 ==
On November 20, 1969, the group Indians of All Tribes (IAT) began a 19-month occupation of Alcatraz Island, 1.25 miles (2.01 km) in the San Francisco Bay, just off the shoreline of the city. The protesters, predominantly students, drew inspiration and tactics from contemporary civil rights demonstrations, some of which they had themselves organized. The stated intention of the Occupation was to gain Native American control over the island for the purpose of building a center for Native American Studies, an American Native American spiritual center, an ecology center, and an Native American Museum. The occupiers specifically cited their treatment under the Indian termination policy and they accused the U.S. government of breaking numerous Indian treaties.

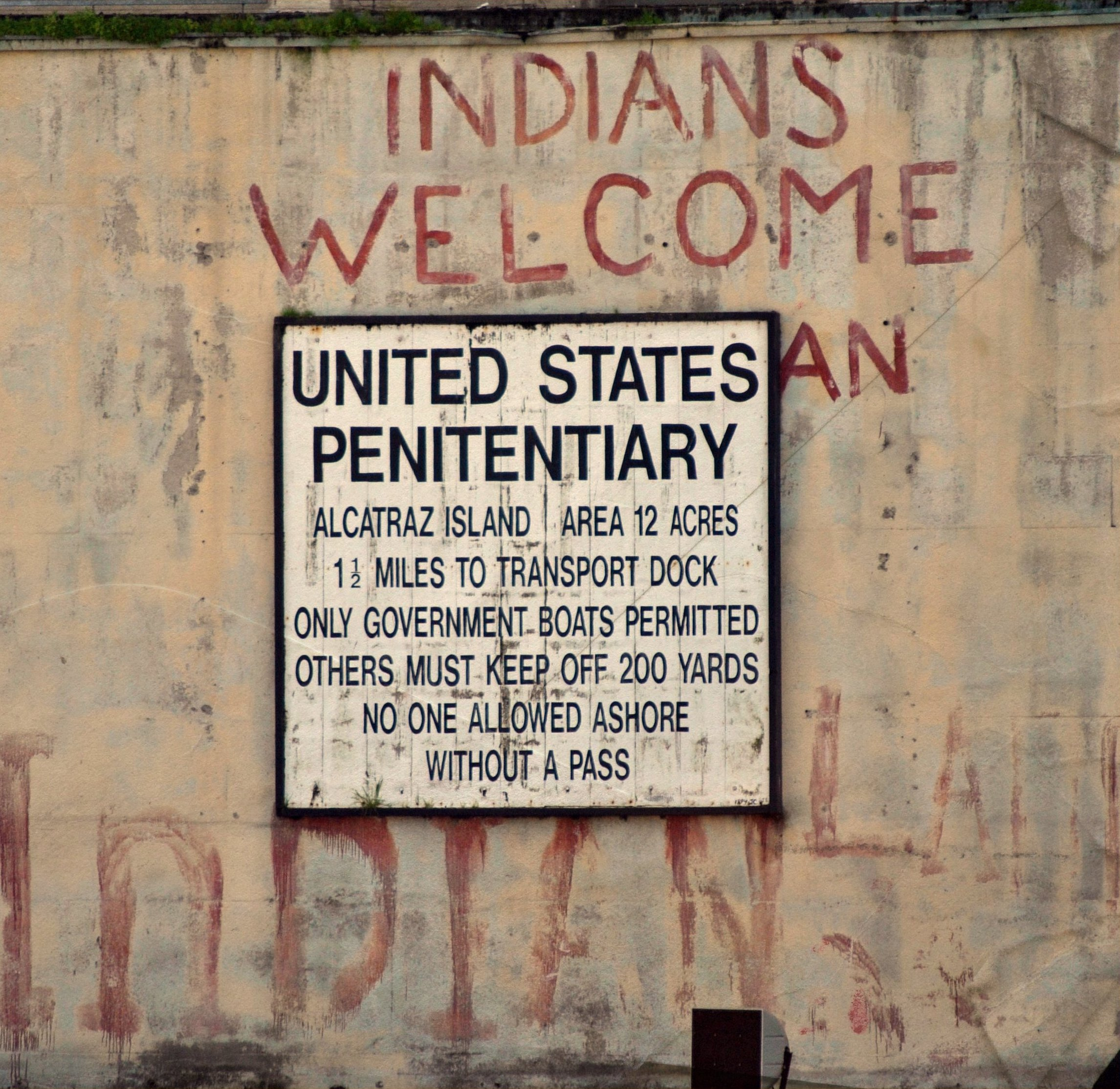
A lingering sign of the 1969–71 Native American Alcatraz occupation

In December 1969, one of the occupiers, Isani Sioux John Trudell, began making daily radio broadcasts from the island, and in January 1970, occupiers began publishing a newsletter. Joseph Morris, a Blackfoot member of the local longshoreman's union, rented space on Pier 40 to facilitate the transportation of supplies and people to the island. Some non-aboriginal members of San Francisco's drug and hippie scene also moved to the island, until non-Native Americans were prohibited from staying overnight. By late May 1970, the government had cut off all electrical power and all telephone service to the island. In June, a fire of disputed origin destroyed numerous buildings on the island. Left without power, fresh water, and in the face of diminishing public support and sympathy, the number of occupiers began to dwindle. On June 11, 1971, a large force of government officers removed the remaining 15 people from the island, forcibly ending a 19-month occupation.

In 1970, Alex de Renzy of San Francisco produced a documentary, Pornography in Denmark: A New Approach, about the red light district of Copenhagen. The film, which grossed $2 million on a $15,000 budget, resulted in a well-documented court case, in which the judge ruled that it was "in keeping with the Supreme Court edict that draws the line between what constitutes free speech and what constitutes obscenity." As a result, some open-minded San Franciscans became filmmakers and porn merchants, with the likes of the Mitchell brothers and Lowell Pickett capitalizing on the legalization of pornography in the city, and it was referred to early on by The New York Times as "The Smut Capital of the United States" and "the porn capital of America", with a rush later compared to the Silicon Valley boom of the late 1990s. "Storefront" theaters and peep-show booths sprang up around the city throughout 1970, with buildings such as the Presidio and the Centre and Regal on Market Street converted to X-rated theatres. All sorts of kinky shops, publications and items sprang up around the city, including the first "leather" bondage magazine, Whipcrack in 1971. According to Josh Sides, in April and May 1970, "more than 950 patrons of adult bookstores, 367 patrons of pornographic video arcades, and more than 3,100 patrons of adult movie theaters" were observed in San Francisco. Although government officials, such as Supervisor Dianne Feinstein, frowned upon the growth of the industry in San Francisco in the 1970s, the police force were known to be more lenient towards adult film makers and theatre owners in the city than in other US cities. Many women's rights groups, notably Women Against Violence in Pornography and Media, campaigned actively against the industry, believing it to be demoralizing and demeaning to women., though some sex workers within San Francisco, such as Margo St. James, created sex-positive advocacy groups and lobbied for decriminalization of vice laws.

Modern Latino Culture is represented by several artistic and cultural institutions in the Mission District. The "Mission Cultural Center" for Latino Arts was established in 1976 by Chicano (Mexican-American) artists to cater to the taste of all classes of all ages of the community and is considered the "epicenter of Latino culture." Galería de la Raza, which was founded here in 1970 by el Movimiento (the Chicano civil rights movement is a nationally recognized institution in the Bay Area. The Yerba Buena Center for the Arts (YBCA) celebrates Latino culture with a "Carnaval," every year, which is said to be the largest multi-cultural event in San Francisco.

A gay San Francisco postal worker who was to be dismissed from service by the Civil Service Commission on the grounds of "moral incompetency" fought for his rights in the court, in November 1970, and was reinstated in the job. This marked the beginning of gay reforms.

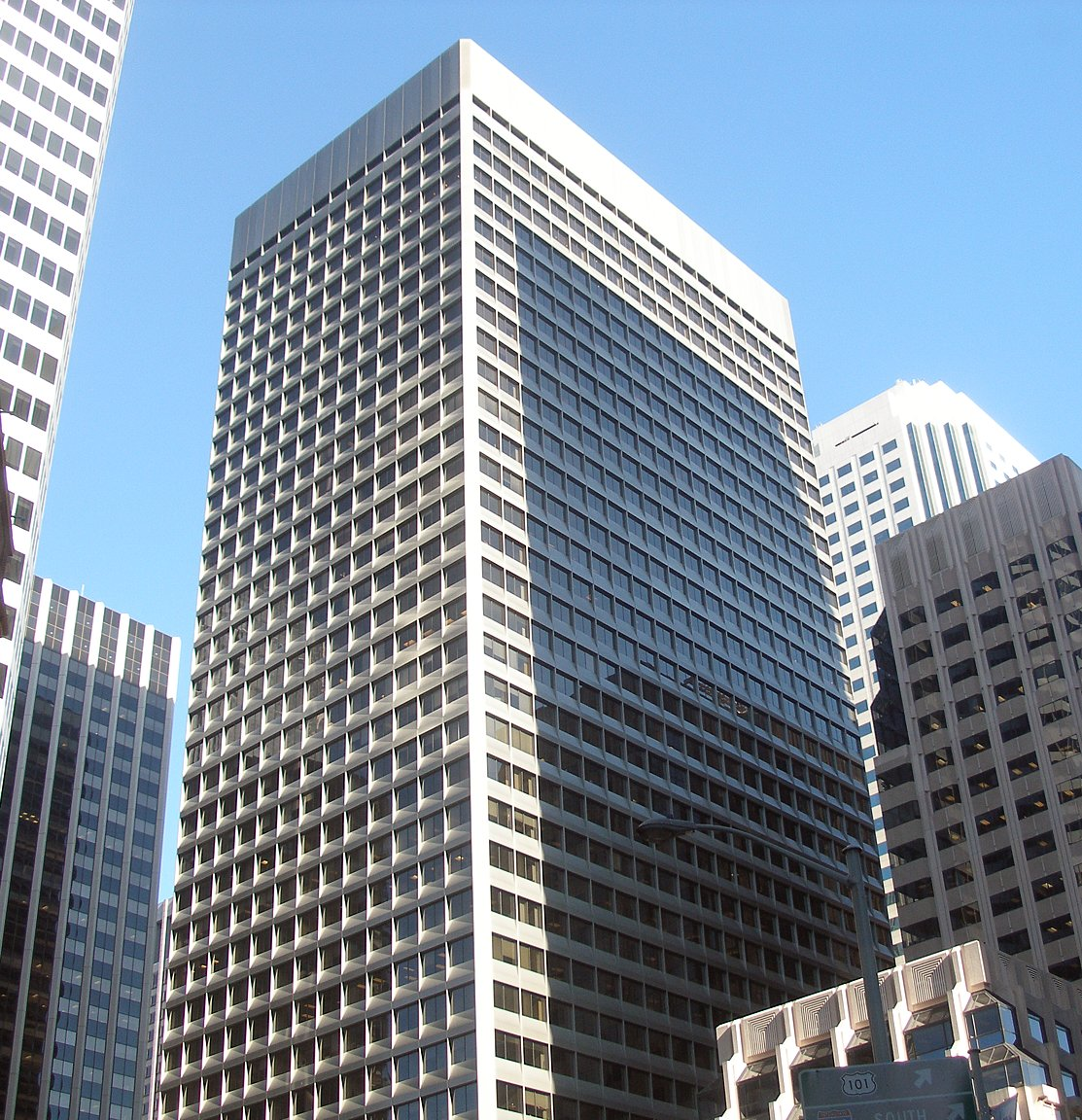
425 Market Street

Many important skyscrapers in San Francisco were built in the 1970s. The Hilton San Francisco and Towers was built in 1971. 425 Market Street was completed in 1973. The 160 m (520 ft), 38 floor office tower at 425 Market Street was built by the Metropolitan Life Insurance Company as their "Pacific Coast Headquarters" and was called "1 Metropolitan Plaza". It was built as a modern replacement for their older headquarters on Nob Hill at 600 Stockton Street (now remodeled as the Ritz-Carlton Hotel). It was among the first buildings in San Francisco to have a high-speed transport system for computer data cards, files and inner-office mail, at the time a state-of-the-art system.

On May Day 1971, protesters demonstrated against the Vietnam War which led to violent clashes with the police, leading to some 100 arrests. Some 150,000 marchers turned out at the anti-war protests in San Francisco.

In 1971, the murder of police officer Sgt. John V. Young in San Francisco led to the arrests and indictments of several former Black Panther Party members. The unsolved murders of the Zodiac Killer continued to mystify San Franciscans as the killer repeatedly send taunting messages to the San Francisco Chronicle taking credit for various Northern California killings through 1970 and 1971.

== 1972–73 ==
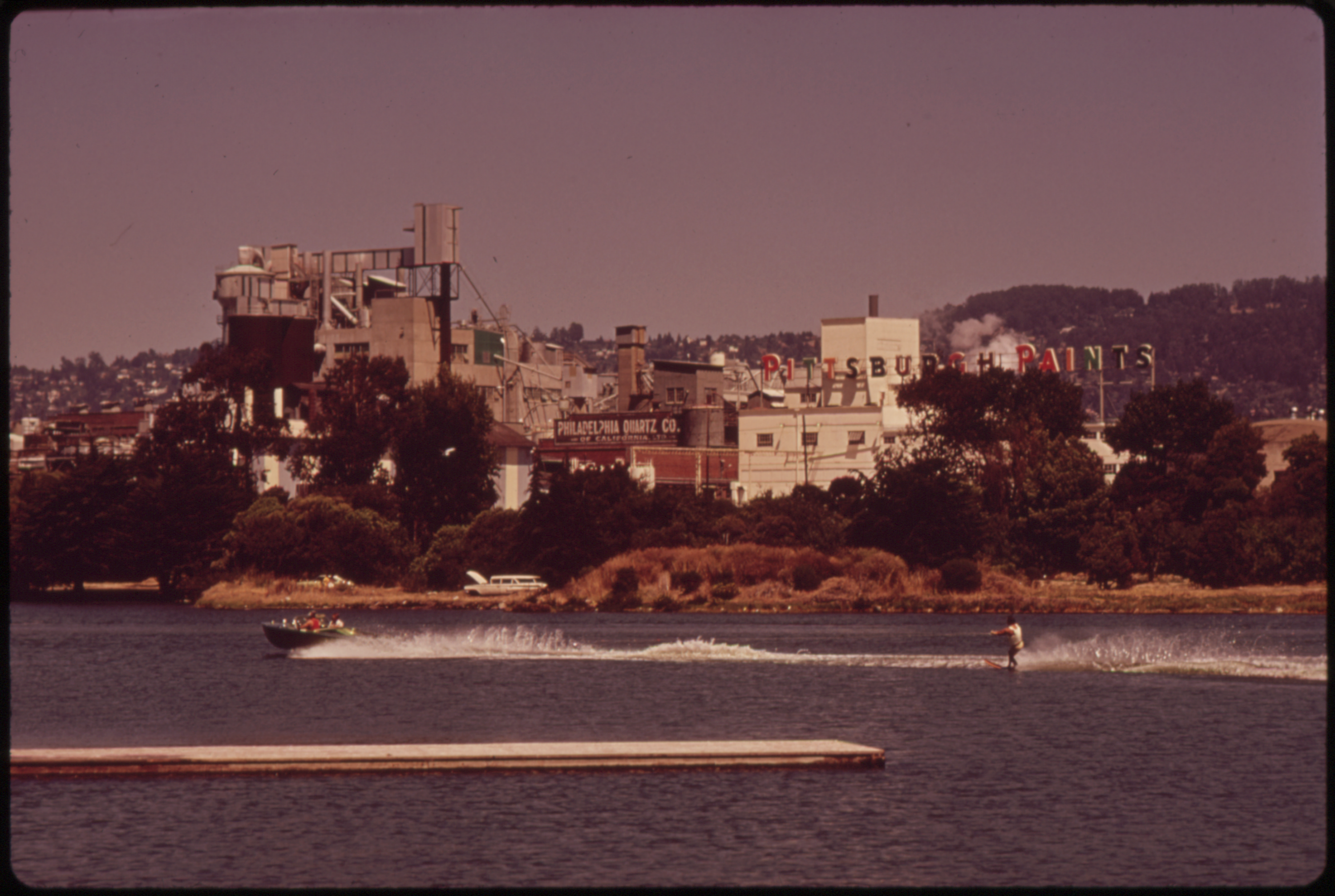
San Francisco in 1972

The black and Asian population of San Francisco continued to contribute significantly to San Francisco in the 1970s. The black population of San Francisco peaked in the early 1970s; in 1972 one in seven citizens was black. Many African-American residents still lived in the Fillmore district, which had given birth to a thriving jazz scene and been called the Harlem of the West in the 50s and 60s. However, urban redevelopment began to push blacks out of the Fillmore in the late 1960s; by 1980 San Francisco's black population had decreased by 10%. Some Japanese-Americans had returned to the Fillmore after their internment during World War II, and Japantown opened to great fanfare in 1968. Chinese Americans had a long history in San Francisco; new immigrants joined established residents in Chinatown and other San Francisco neighborhoods. The 1970s also saw the arrival into San Francisco's Tenderloin district of refugees from Vietnam and other areas of Southeast Asia following the end of the Vietnam War in 1975.

Many socially marginalized individuals, outcasts and LGBT people continued to increase in numbers in the city, which became a haven for them and where they could share a common identity in numbers, not only attracted by its gay-friendly reputation but for its reputation as a radical, left-wing center. The lesbian community of San Francisco between 1972 and 1975 has been described as a "series of overlapping social networks, in which friendship groups focus[ed] around pair relationships or special interests." Some women met in lesbian bars that were scattered around the city, including Maud's, Wild Side West, and others. Gay men had 118 bars and nightclubs to choose from in 1973, many of them in the Polk Gulch or Castro District. These new LGBT residents were the prime movers of Gay Liberation and often lived communally, buying decrepit Victorians in the Haight and fixing them up. When drugs and violence began to become a serious problem in the Haight, some gay people simply moved "over the hill" to the Castro replacing Irish-Americans who had moved to the more affluent and culturally homogeneous suburbs. The Castro became known as a Gay Mecca, and its gay population, particularly men, swelled as significant numbers of gay people moved to San Francisco in the 1970s and 1980s. The growth of the gay population caused tensions with some of the established ethnic groups in the southern part of the city.

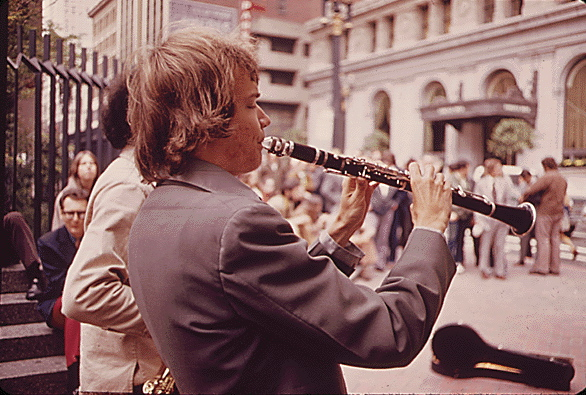
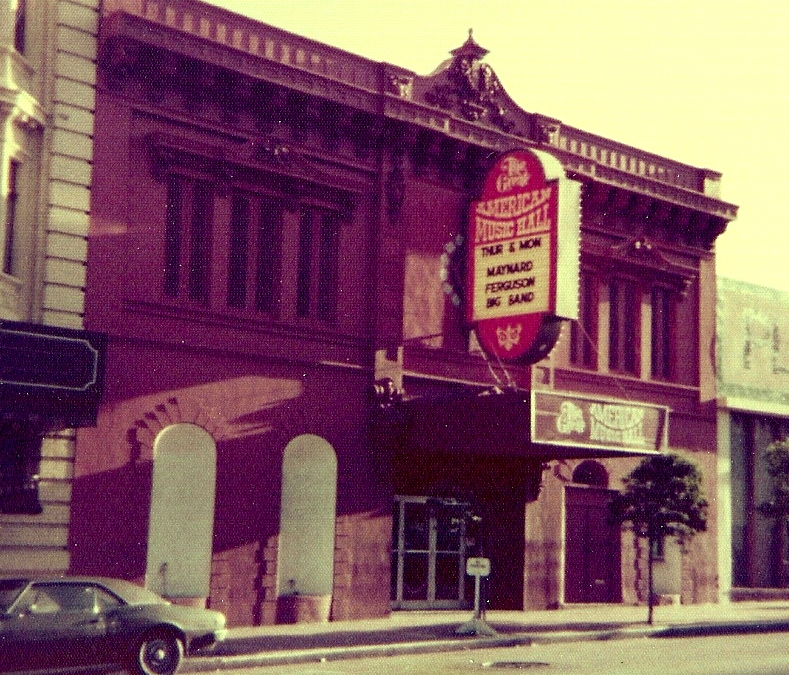
Left:Musicians on Union Square, 1973. Right: Great American Music Hall, April 1976

The music scene, especially jazz fusion, but also rock music and disco thrived in the city in the 1970s, and from the late 1970s onwards San Francisco also became a major focal point in the North American and international punk, thrash metal, and rave scenes. In 1967, thousands of young people had entered the Haight-Ashbury district during what became known as the Summer of Love. The San Francisco Sound emerged as an influential force in rock music, with such acts as Jefferson Airplane and the Grateful Dead achieving international prominence. These groups blurred the boundaries between folk, rock and jazz traditions and further developed rock's lyrical content. The 1972 album Graham Nash David Crosby was partly recorded in Wally Heider's studios in San Francisco and Los Angeles. In 1973, The Steve Miller band, led by Steve Miller, began churning out musical hits such as "The Joker," "Fly Like An Eagle" and "Jet Airliner". That same year in San Francisco, former members of Santana and the Steve Miller Band formed what would become one of the best-selling rock acts of all time, Journey.

Nightclubs across the city increasingly featured jazz fusion artists who moved away from traditional jazz, embracing a range of influences including Brazilian musical forms; bongo playing for instance became one of the musical icons of the city during this period. Keystone Korner in North Beach was a notable jazz club which opened in 1972, featuring jazz greats like Miles Davis, McCoy Tyner, Betty Carter and others. Another popular nightclub of the 1970s which opened in 1972 was Dave Allen's The Boarding House (nightclub), which hosted music and comedy, featuring Bette Midler, Patti Smith, Dolly Parton, Steve Martin, Robin Williams, and others. In the 1970s, the rise of disco was one of the biggest musical genres of the decade (rooted in funk, Latin and soul vocal music supported by bass lines and electronic synthesizers). Disco took hold in the San Francisco gay community in the early 1970s and by 1978 the androgynous San Francisco singer Sylvester had achieved national prominence with several disco hits.

In 1973, Margo St. James founded the first feminist sex worker advocacy group, COYOTE, which provided legal and health services to prostitutes and lobbied to change the public image and criminalization of sex work. St. James was also one of the hosts of the first Hookers Masquerade Ball in 1974, which became an annual San Francisco tradition in the 1970s, drawing local celebrities and city leaders like police chief Charles Gain. This tradition of an annual "erotic" masquerade party continued into the 21st century with the creation of the Exotic Erotic Ball in 1979.

The San Francisco Bay Area continued to be a leading academic center in the 1970s, centered around the major universities of Stanford University and Berkeley. In May 1972, for instance, the first demonstration of acupuncture in San Francisco was held at Stanford which attracted some 1,400 physicians.

The 1970s also brought other major changes to the city such as the construction of its first subway system, BART, which connected San Francisco with other cities in the Bay Area. At stations in downtown San Francisco, BART connects with MUNI, the city subway, which has lines that run underground along Market Street, and then along surface streets through much of the city.

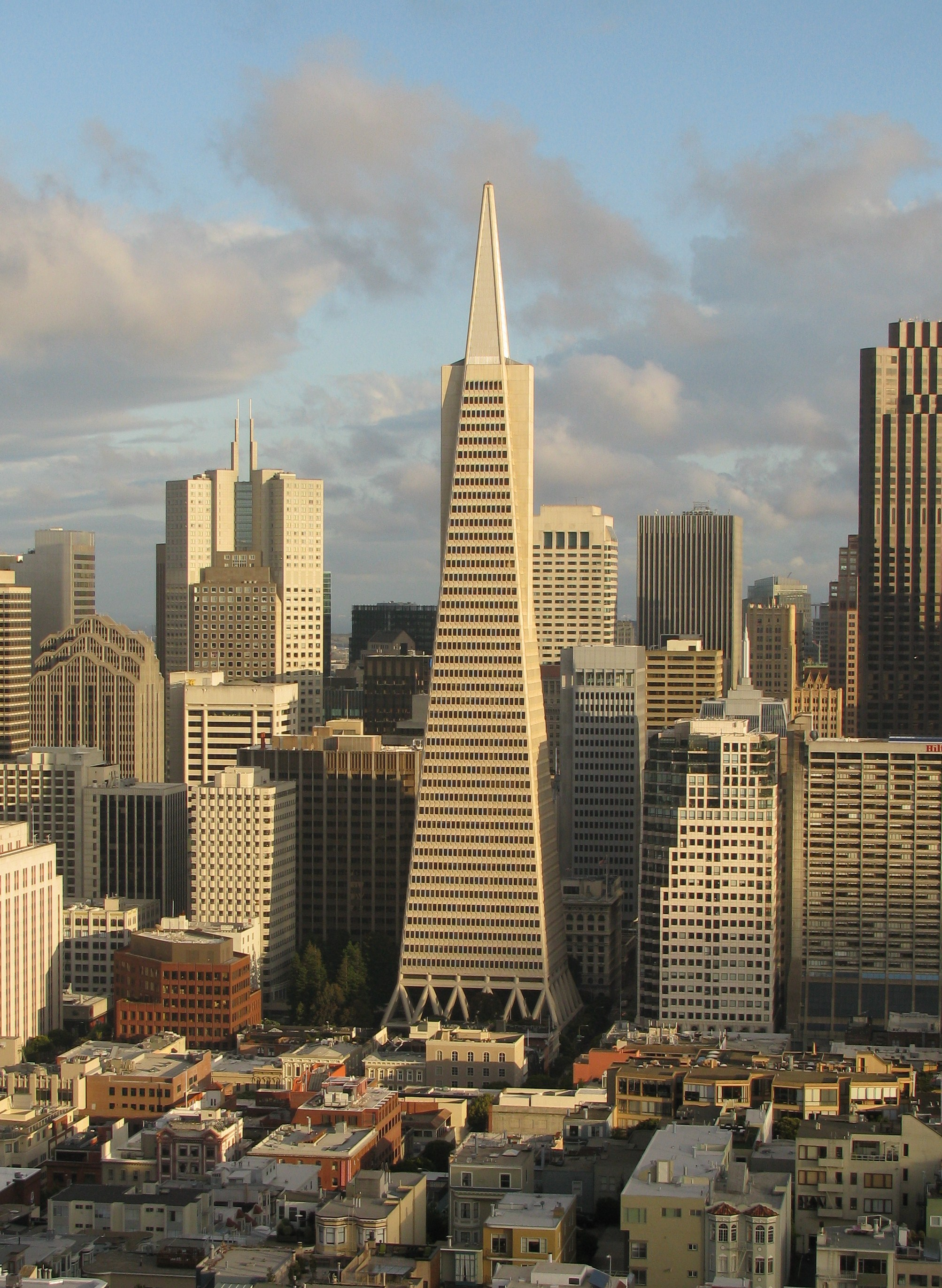
Transamerica Pyramid one of the tallest skyscrapers in San Francisco

The Transamerica Pyramid is one of the tallest skyscrapers on the San Francisco skyline and one of its most iconic. Although the building no longer houses the headquarters of the Transamerica Corporation, it is still strongly associated with the company and is depicted in the company's logo. Designed by architect William Pereira and built by Hathaway Dinwiddie Construction Company, at 260 m (850 ft), upon completion in 1972 it was among the five tallest buildings in the world.

San Francisco also saw a series of racially motivated murders during this time with the Zebra Killings.

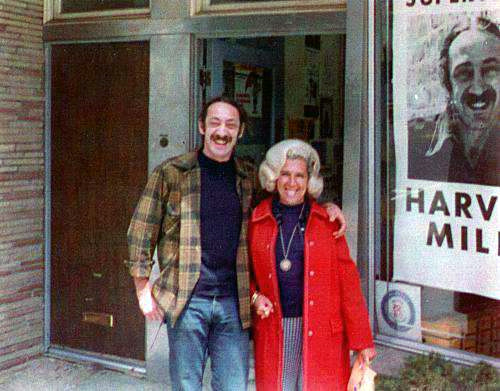
Harvey and Audrey Milk (1973)

== 1974–75 ==
In 1974, the education system came under scrutiny with public outcries for improvements. City newspapers ran headlines such as "Angry San Francisco Parents Ask State for Help", "Angry Board Members Talk: Why Schools Don't Improve", "School Costs Rose as Enrollment Fell", "San Francisco Staff Still Outnumbers Teachers", and "Board of Education Exempts Many Bilingual Students from School Bus Program". Subsequently, a commission was appointed to study the city's educational problems, which was considered akin to declaring the San Francisco Unified School District a disaster area.

In the same year, with bankruptcy imminent for the San Francisco Ballet, a grassroots effort brought national attention to the association.

Prior to the discovery of the first AIDS case in 1981, Dr. Selma Dritz, the city's medical epidemiologist, became alarmed at the increase in sexually transmitted diseases among the city's gay men, opining that epidemics had been triggered after 1974 by "political and social changes in the city".

The Grateful Dead Movie was filmed in 1974 in San Francisco during the Grateful Dead's October 1974 five performances at the Winterland Ballroom.

After the 1974 kidnapping of newspaper heiress Patricia Hearst in Berkeley, her father gave away more than $6 million worth of food to those in need in the San Francisco area, only to learn that the Symbionese Liberation Army felt his efforts weren't sufficient, thereby retaining Hearst as their prisoner. On April 15, 1974, Hearst was recorded on surveillance video wielding an M1 carbine while robbing the Sunset District branch of the Hibernia Bank at 1450 Noriega Street in San Francisco, having taken the revolutionary name Tania. Hearst was arrested in San Francisco with other SLA members in 1975.

In August 1975, almost the entire San Francisco Police Department police force staged a strike as the city refused to increase their pay.

On September 22, 1975, Sara Jane Moore attempted to assassinate President Gerald Ford in front of the St. Francis Hotel in Union Square, San Francisco by firing two gunshots at him, both of which missed. A bystander, Oliver Sipple grabbed her shooting arm after hearing the first shot, which may have caused her to miss the second shot and save Ford's life.

On the anniversary of the Mexican Revolution, the Mexican Museum was founded in 1975 in the Mission District.

Harvey Milk, an openly gay man, ran for election to the San Francisco Board of Supervisors but did not win; when he ran again in two years, he won a seat on the board.

== 1976–77 ==
The Golden Dragon massacre that occurred on 4 September 1977 originated with a dispute at the Golden Dragon Restaurant between the Joe Boys, and the Wah Ching, two Chinatown gangs. The Joe Boys attacked the Wah Ching at this restaurant as they had vandalized the graves of some of the Joe Boys members who had been killed. In the resulting gun battle of five innocent bystanders, including two tourists, were killed and 11 injured and this incident came to be known as the Golden Dragon Massacre following which the San Francisco Police Department's Gang Task Force came to be established.

San Francisco was unusual for a large city in that its Board of Supervisors was chosen in at-large elections, with all candidates appearing together on the ballot. The candidate who received the most votes was elected President of the Board of Supervisors, with runners up filling the remaining open seats. District elections were enacted by Proposition T in November 1976. The first district-based elections in 1977 resulted in a radical change to the composition of the Board, including the election of groundbreaking minority candidates Harvey Milk, Gordon Lau, Ella Hill Hutch, and Carol Ruth Silver. After former Supervisor Dan White shot and killed Supervisor Milk and Mayor George Moscone inside city hall, district elections were deemed too divisive and San Francisco returned to at-large elections until 2000.

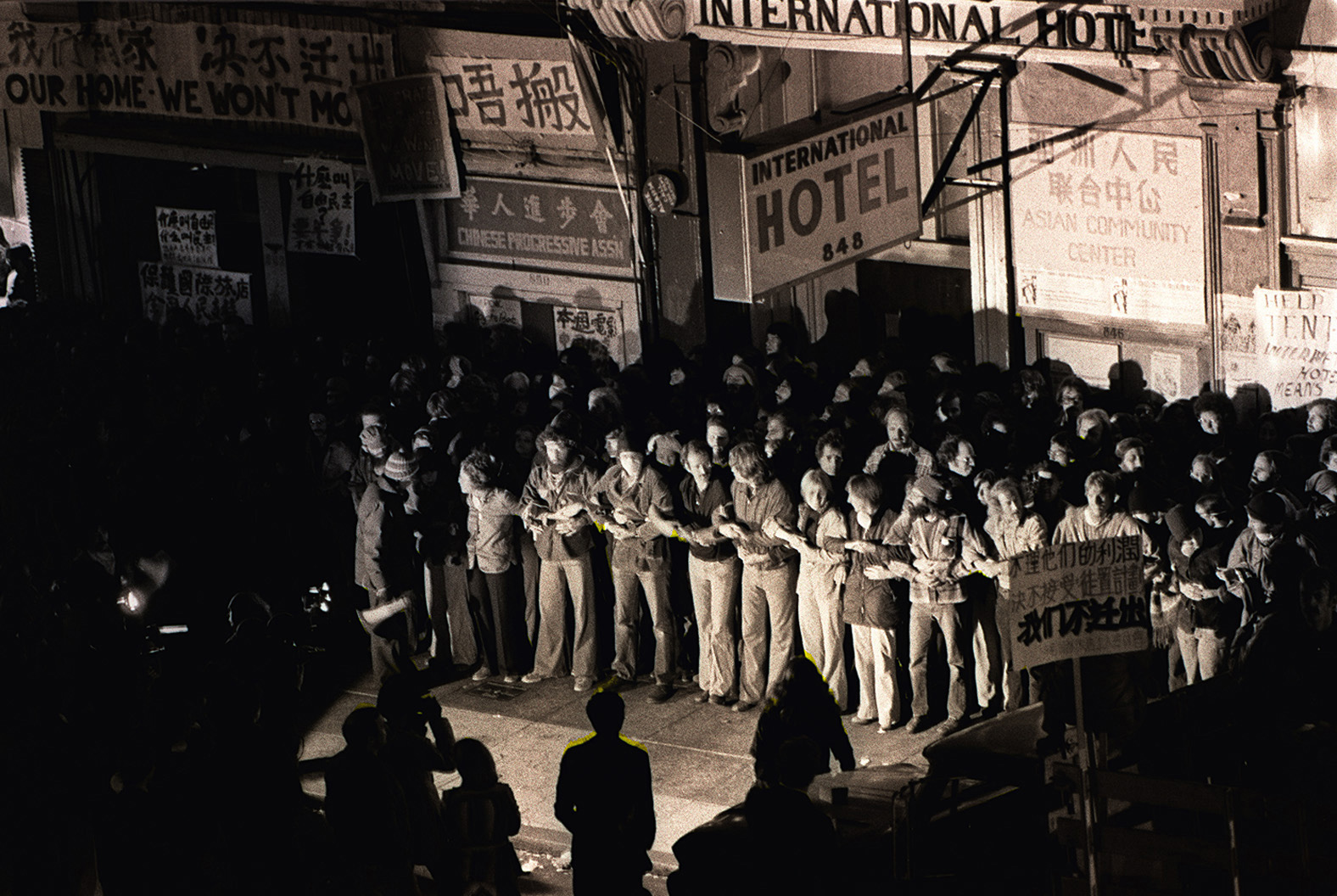
Protesters in front of the International Hotel

On August 4, 1977, the last 50 residents of the International Hotel, a building that had housed nearly 200 low-income Asian and Filipino American residents, were forcibly evicted after several years of political battles between residents and developers who wanted to convert the building for urban renewal. Five thousand demonstrators blocked the building in an attempt to stop the eviction.

Later in 1977, under increased public scrutiny, Jim Jones of the People's Temple, which had established itself in San Francisco in 1971, fled with many of his followers to Jonestown in Guyana, where over nine hundred people committed suicide by drinking poisoned Kool-Aid on November 18, 1978.

== 1978–79 ==
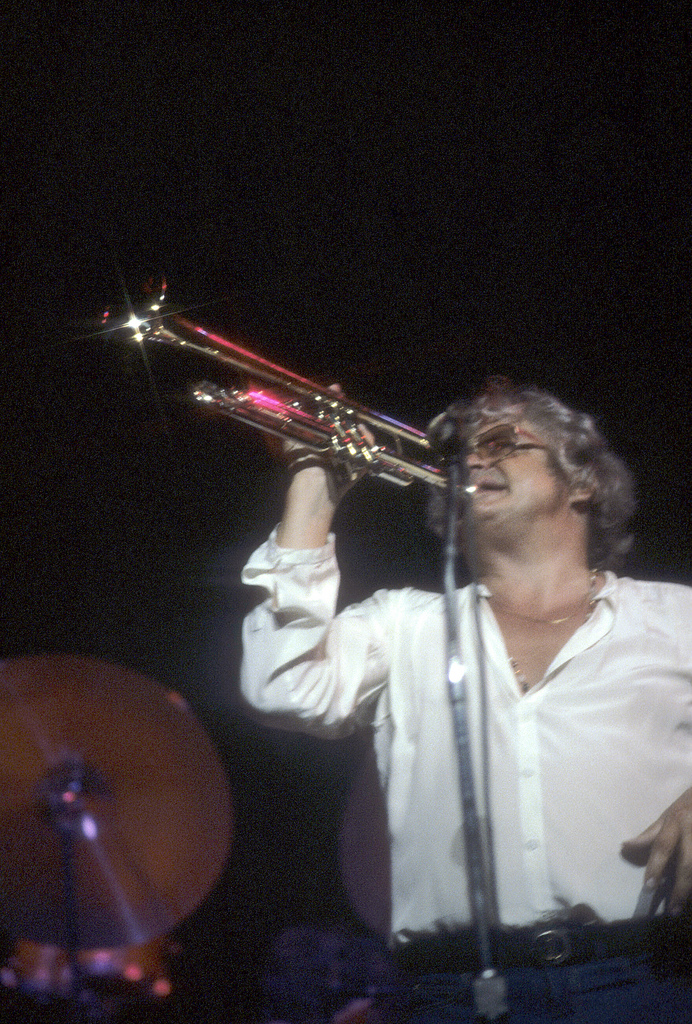
Maynard Ferguson at The Warfield in 1978

Maynard Ferguson recorded live at the Great American Music Hall, in 1978; his album "Bebop Buffet" became one of his strongest jazz albums.

The late 1970s saw the formation of a punk rock music scene in San Francisco, with the Mabuhay Gardens club hosting local bands like the Dead Kennedys, (formed in 1978) and the Avengers (formed in 1977).

Allan Bérubé, the author of the book tilted "Coming Out Under Fire: The History of Gay Men and Women in World War II" was instrumental in bringing forth some of the ordeals of the men and women of the armed forces who had the vision to challenge, in the mid-1970s, the discriminatory practice followed in excluding them as they were gay. This received wide publicity as "gays in the military" and Allan Bérubé's campaign in San Francisco, started in the 1970s, culminated in establishing the San Francisco Lesbian and Gay History project, in 1978–79. Following the awareness created by this project, many ex-servicemen challenged their termination from the armed services which resulted only in further tightening the rules against gays by the armed services.

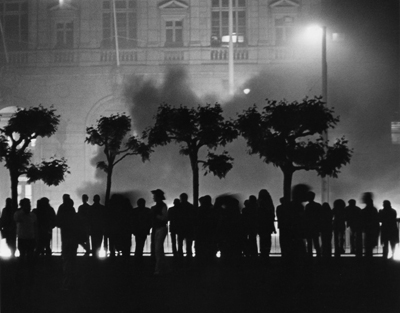
Rioters outside San Francisco City Hall the evening of May 21, 1979, reacting to the voluntary manslaughter verdict for Dan White, that ensured White would serve only five years for the double murders of Harvey Milk and George Moscone

In The Castro, Milk exhibited photographs of gays taken by photographer Jerry Pritikin, in his photoshop, Castro Camera. Following a protest march by Anita Bryant in Dade County, Florida in 1977, held to rescind a gay rights ordinance, a similar support march was held in San Francisco which was led by Milk. In this march, attended by 5000 people, there was a single slogan board which said "Save Our Rights." A photo of this event was publicized for many months. Milk and others in the city also campaigned heavily against the Briggs Initiative, which would have prohibited gay people from teaching in California public schools. Harvey Milk became the first gay male politician to be elected to the San Francisco Board of Supervisors. On November 27, 1978, he was assassinated, along with Mayor George Moscone, by Dan White, a former police officer and Board of Supervisor member, who climbed into a window at City Hall and shot both men.

Defense attorneys of Dan White used what was later referred to as The Twinkie Defense, arguing that White was under mental duress and garnering sympathy from jury members. White was saved from a murder conviction, and convicted of voluntary manslaughter, with a maximum sentence of seven years in prison. The verdict led to rioting and burning of police vehicles by some members of the LGBT community on 21 May 1979 which came to be known as the White Night riots. The day after the verdict, a birthday party for Milk was held in the Castro, drawing 20,000 people. Also reported in 1979, off-duty police officers attacked a San Francisco lesbian bar, assaulted the bouncer and harassed the women, which was widely criticized. The assault resulted in one conviction with a sentence of probation and temporary suspensions of some of the officers involved.

After Moscone's death, Dianne Feinstein became mayor of San Francisco.

== See also ==
- History of San Francisco
