= Nightclub act =

Genre of entertainment

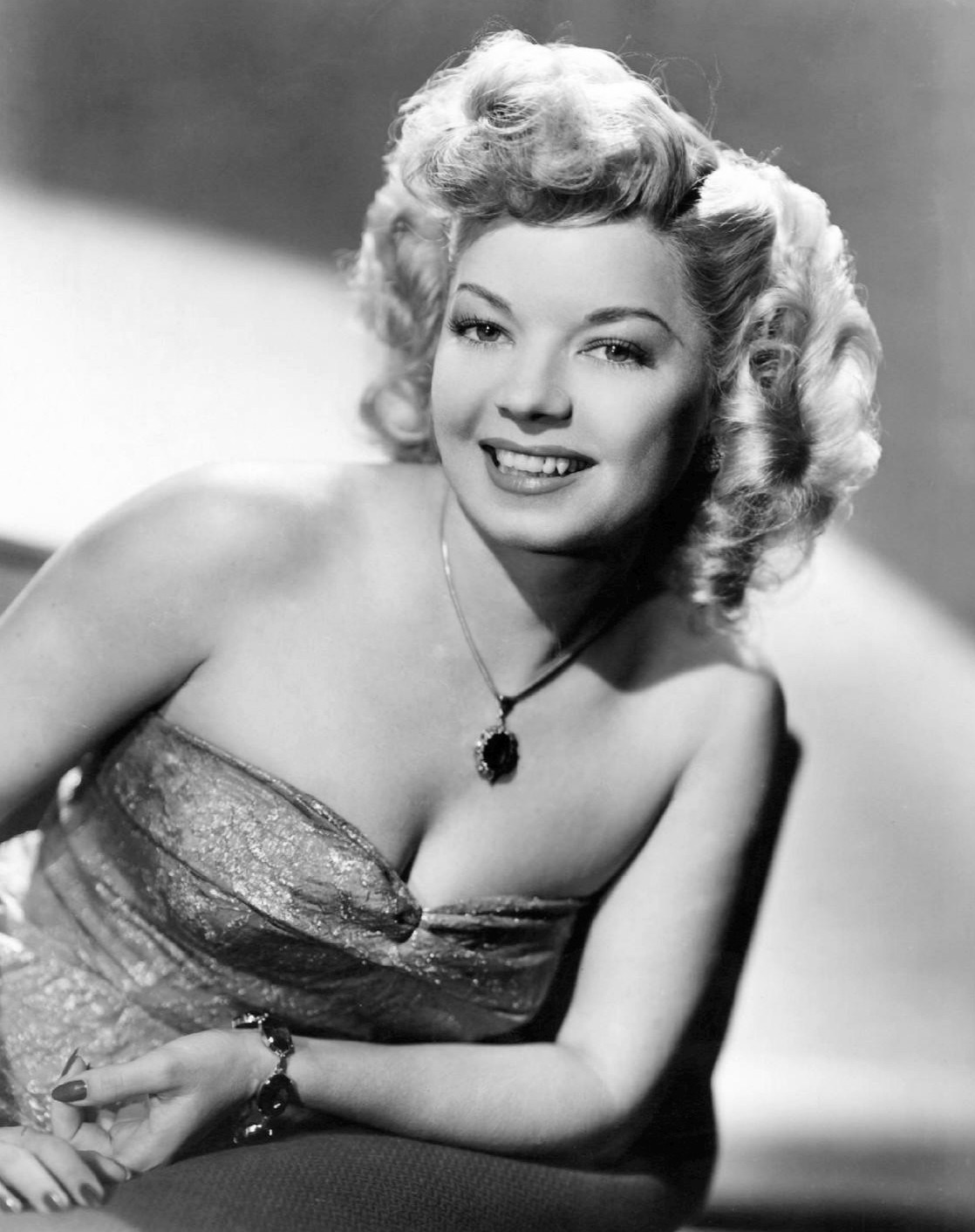
1946 publicity shot of nightclub singer Frances Langford

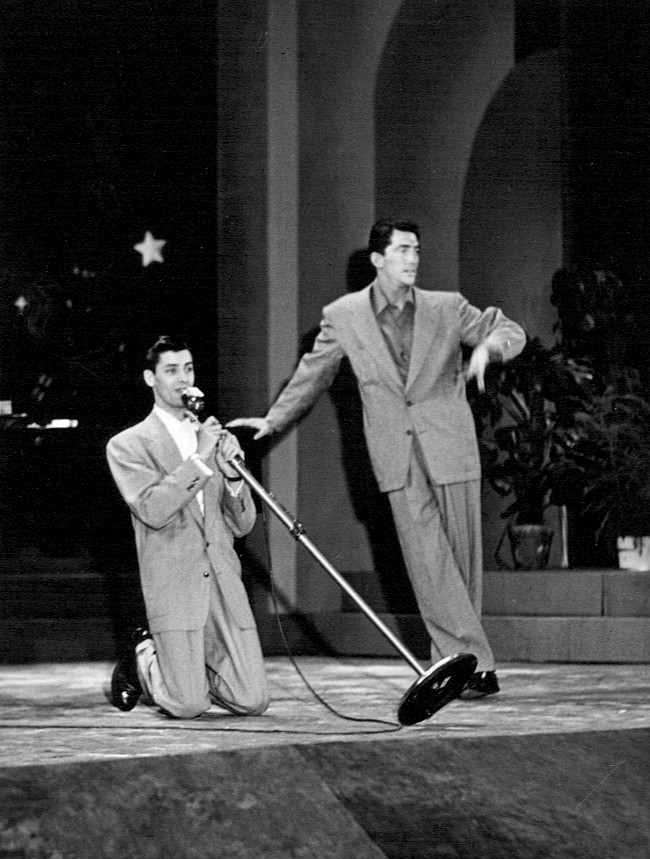
Martin and Lewis (1948)

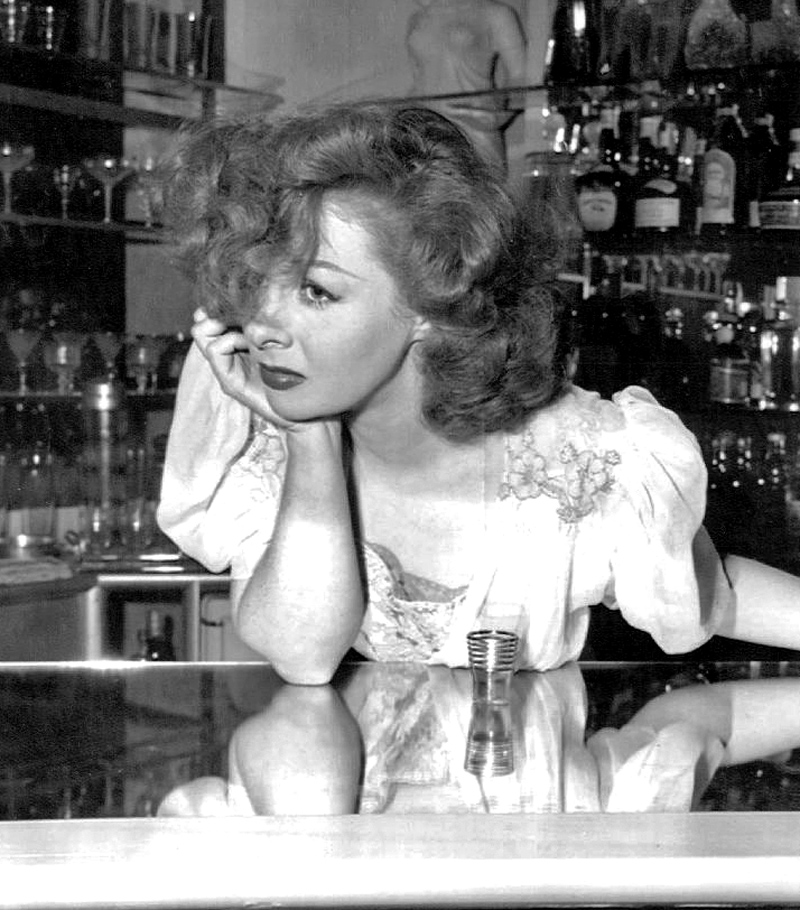
Susan Hayward as an alcoholic nightclub singer in Smash Up (1947)

A nightclub act is a production, usually of nightclub music or comedy, designed for performance at a nightclub, a type of drinking establishment, by a nightclub performer such as a nightclub singer or nightclub dancer, whose performance may also be referred to as a nightclub act. A scheduled performance, such as a wedding gig, is a club date.

Acts may resemble revues and, "a good part of the music heard in nightclubs is standard popular song (jazz standards and the so-called Great American Songbook) and theater music repertoire...comedy songs, novelty songs, and the occasional torch song." "Cabaret, literally, is a subset of nightclub performance...In actual modern usage the terms 'nightclub' and 'cabaret' are virtually interchangeable." (Note: Cabaret is derived from tavern, probably from Middle Dutch cambret. The word cabaret came to mean "a restaurant or night club" by 1912.)

What distinguishes stage performance in a nightclub or club date setting is the breaking down of the "fourth wall," the invisible barrier between audience and performer that separates their realities. The audience's disbelief doesn't have to be suspended for more than the length of a song.

The role of the female nightclub singer occurs frequently in fiction: books, movies, television, and even songs; she may serve as temptress, kidnapping or abuse victim, femme fatale, gangster moll, or as a prostitute. Due to censorship, a nightclub singer was often used to replace a prostitute character in film adaptations of books.

Nightclub acts were more common in the past, as modern nightclubs have moved towards dance music, DJs, and rave like environments. However, musicians such as David Bowie and Madonna have played nightclub singers in music videos and live performances. In New York City, since 1985, successful, enduring, or innovative cabaret acts have been honored by the annual Bistro Awards.

== Performers ==
Notable nightclub performers include:

- Karen Akers
- Marjorie Anthony Linden
- Liane Augustin
- Kay Thompson
- Jane Badler
- Polly Bergen
- Monica Boyar
- Louise Brooks
- Georgia Brown
- Chris Connor
- Görel Crona
- Elizabeth Dawn
- Vivian Della Chiesa
- Norma Donaldson
- Colleen Farrington
- Redd Foxx
- Gladys Gale
- Johnny Gilbert
- Buddy Greco
- Ellen Greene
- Lena Horne
- Johnnie Johnston
- Salena Jones
- Velma Kelly
- Mabel King
- Abbe Lane
- Frances Langford
- Joi Lansing
- Gary Lawyer
- Abbey Lincoln
- Martin and Lewis
  - Jerry Lewis
  - Dean Martin
- Liza Minnelli
- Helen Morgan
- Anita O'Day
- Marg Osburne
- Lucia Pamela
- Alice Prin
- Joe Pullum
- Red
- Jean Ross
- Willie Scott
- Beverly Shaw
- Nina Simone
- Penny Singleton
- Richard Smart
- Danny Thomas
- Mary Wells
- Jayne Mansfield

Performers at the 500 Club, one of the most popular nightclubs on the East Coast, included Frank Sinatra, Sammy Davis Jr., Martin and Lewis, the Will Mastin Trio, Jimmy Durante, Eartha Kitt, Sophie Tucker, the Jackie Paris Trio, Milton Berle, Nat King Cole, and Liberace, among many others.

== See also ==
- Broadway theatre
- Dinner theater
- Easy listening
- Exotica
- Go-go dancing
- Stripper
- Ziegfeld Follies
