= The Lexington Club =

Dive bar in San Francisco, California, United States

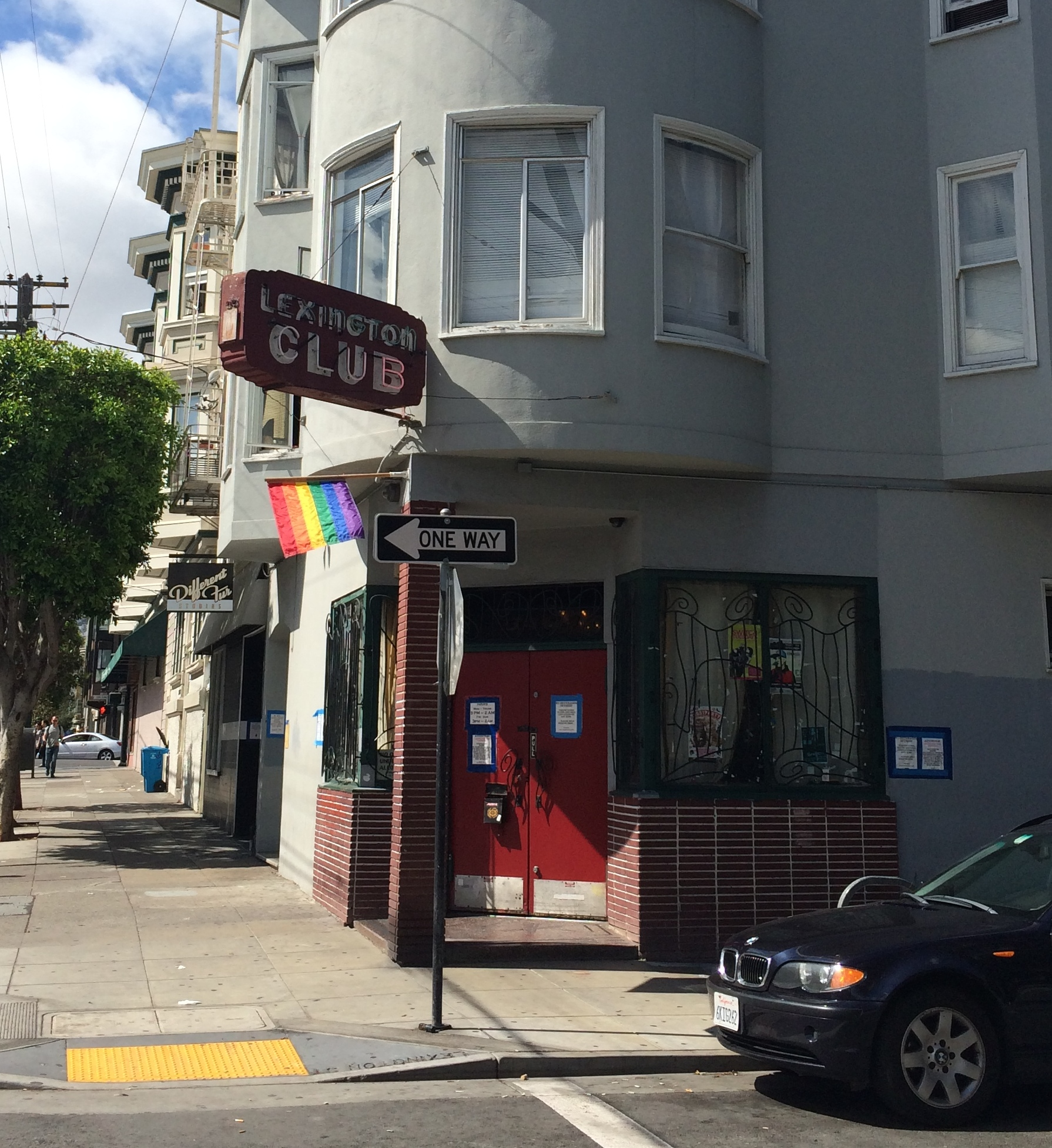
- Interactive map of The Lexington Club

Restaurant information
- Established: 1997
- Closed: 2015
- Owner: Lila Thirkield
- Location: 3464 19th Street, San Francisco, California, 94110, United States
- Coordinates: 37.760263°N 122.420829°W
- Website: lexingtonclub.com

The Lexington Club, often referred to as The Lex, was a dive bar, primarily catered towards queer women, in the Mission District in the American city of San Francisco, California. It was recognized as one of the central landmarks for LGBTQ culture, especially for lesbians and queer women, in San Francisco. The club was founded in 1997 and closed at the end of April 2015.

== History ==
The Lexington Club was opened in 1997 by Lila Thirkield as a response to the numerous options for gay men but lack of options for lesbians and other queer women in San Francisco. She noticed that 16th and Mission had a "significant dyke presence" and decided that it would make a good neighborhood for her lesbian-owned business. Other such businesses and services in the area catering to queer women included The Women's Building, the Osento bathhouse, Old Wives Tales bookstore, and Amelia's bar, which had closed in 1991. The Lexington's site at 19th and Lexington had previously housed a Mexican bar, Sunset.

In October 2014, Thirkield announced that she would sell the Lexington Club and close the establishment in 2015. Thirkield cited rising rent and the changing neighborhood as factors behind her decision to sell, specifically the decline of LGBT patrons residing in the area that made the business unsustainable. She is a co-owner of another bar in the Mission, Virgil's Sea Room. In February 2015, Thirkield announced that the Lexington Club would close at the end of April, and that the bar was being bought out by the PlumpJack Group, owned by politician Gavin Newsom. The once vivid red space became a gray-interiored cocktail bar called Wildhawk.

== Closing and response ==
The bar closed on April 30, 2015, the last remaining lesbian bar in San Francisco. Community members, including the GLBT Historical Society and Supervisor David Campos, initiated a fundraiser for a commemorative plaque. It was unveiled in a ceremony on September 19, 2016.

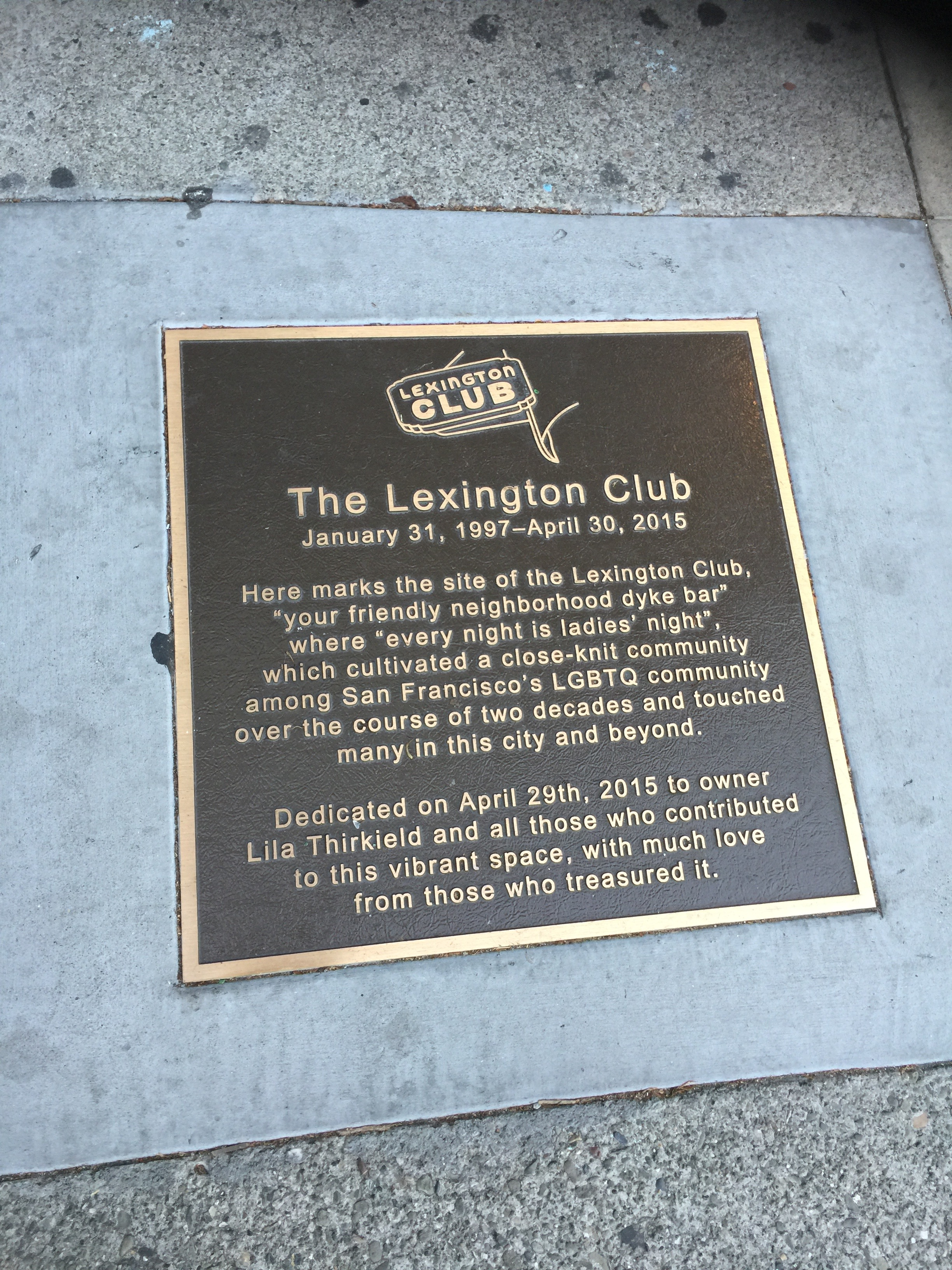
Commemorative sidewalk plaque outside the former Lexington Club

The Lexington Club Archival Project was started by two filmmakers, Susie Smith and Lauren Tabak, in early 2015. The project's mission is stated on their website as: "dedicated to documenting the stories, sounds and images from San Francisco's last full-time lesbian bar, which closed April 30th 2015." The San Francisco International Film Festival screened a short version of the project's work-in-progress documentary film Never a Cover on April 30, 2015. As of September 2015, the project was continuing work on the feature-length documentary and had raised $20,656 in a Kickstarter project.

== Culture ==
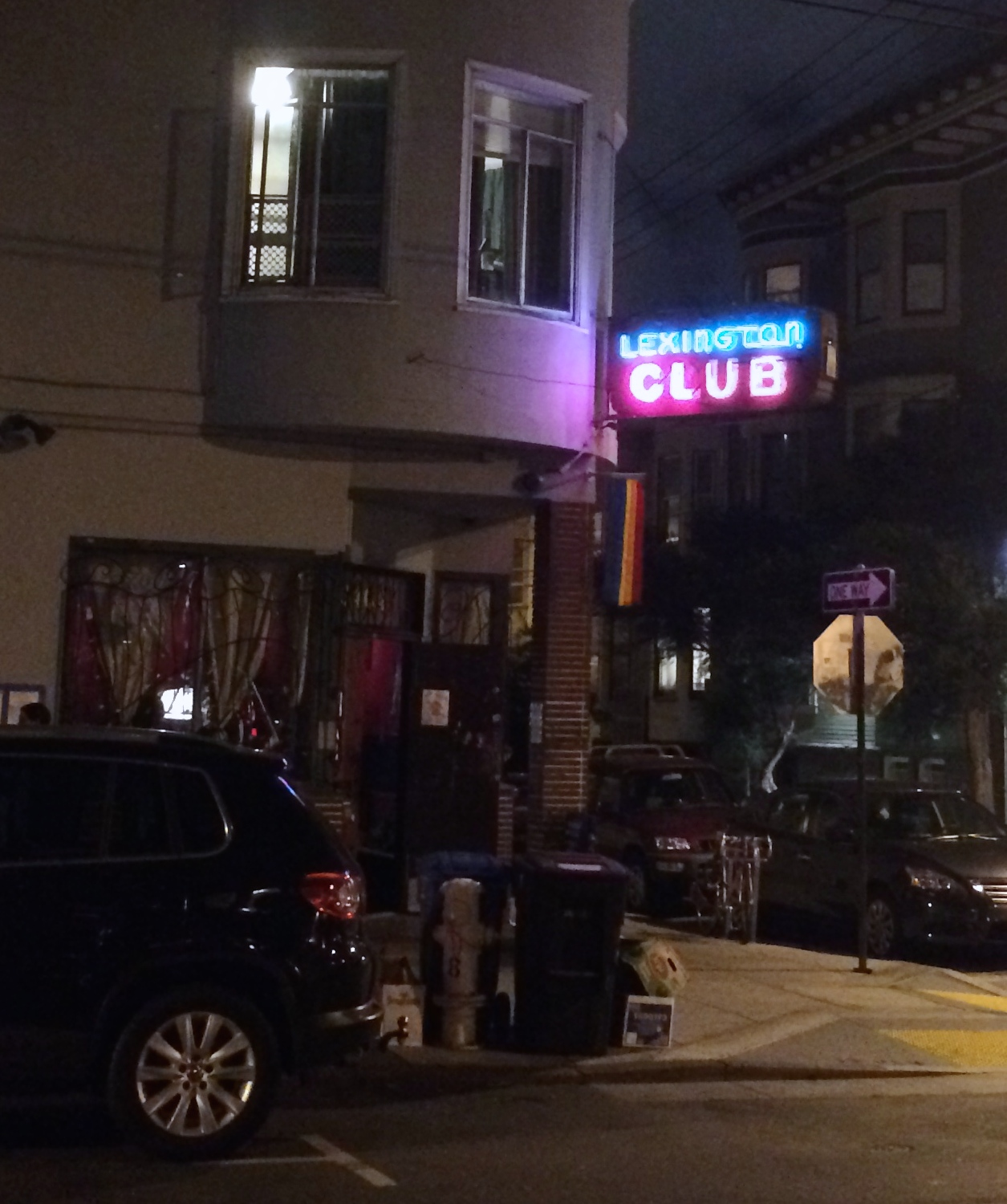
At night, with neon sign.

Michelle Tea's book Valencia (ISBN 9781580050357), which takes place in the Mission District of San Francisco, mentions the Lexington Club. This book has been adapted into a film. Other movies that have featured or been set in the Lexington Club include Ashley 22, How to Pick Up Girls, By Hook or By Crook, The Wild Search, Mechanic's Daydream, Getting Off, and Lit.

== See also ==
- Amelia's
- Maud's
- Mona's 440 Club
- Peg's Place
- Wild Side West
