= The Third Wheel (film) =

- The Third Wheel DVD cover
- Directed by: Jordan Brady
- Written by: Jay Lacopo
- Produced by: Stavros Merjos; Chris Moore; Adam Rosenfelt; Chad Snopek
- Starring: Luke Wilson; Denise Richards; Jay Lacopo; Ben Affleck; Phil Lewis; Deborah Theaker
- Cinematography: Jonathan Brown
- Edited by: Sam Citron; Paul Seydor
- Music by: Lisa Coleman; Wendy Melvoin
- Distributed by: Miramax Films
- Release date: 2002
- Running time: 83 minutes
- Country: United States
- Language: English

The Third Wheel is a 2002 American romantic comedy film directed by Jordan Brady and starring Luke Wilson, Denise Richards, Jay Lacopo and Ben Affleck. Its plot concerns a first date between the clumsy, shy Stanley (Luke Wilson) and the gorgeous Diana (Denise Richards), which is interrupted by a homeless man Phil (Jay Lacopo).

== Plot ==
After more than a year fantasizing about asking out his co-worker, Stanley (Luke Wilson) finally asks Diana Evans (Denise Richards) out on a date.

Meanwhile, their co-workers form an office pool, including his friend, Michael (Ben Affleck). They are monitoring the date between Stan and Diana at a type of party, betting on how far Stan will get with the beautiful Diana. One spies on them, following each step of the first date. Stanley hits a homeless man Phil (Jay Lacopo) with his car as they leave the place where they had a drink, on the way to the theatre. The events that follow are far from the night of romance that Stanley had planned.

Stanley offers to pay for Phil's things that were broken on impact. After withdrawing cash from the ATM, seeing he's limping, they take him to the hospital. Stanley tries to sneak away with Diana, but Phil chases them down, throwing himself at his car.

They finally get to the open air performance in time for the second act: a random series of monologues of famous figures. Phil reappears, wandering on the stage, and does a random monologue on bread. He gets a standing ovation.

Stanley had accidentally parked in a tow-away zone, and Diana and Phil accompany him to get his car. On the bus, Phil has them interact with the others, singing. When they reach the impound, the attendant is not cooperative, so Diana flirts with him. Paying almost $150, they have the car back.

Again, Stanley is planning to drop Phil off, but has a change of heart, inviting to eat with them. She guides them to a Japanese restaurant, where she and Stanley almost kiss, but her ex shows up. Phil defuses him with a slap, then soothes him singing 'Puff the Magic Dragon'.

Later, dropping off Phil, he convinces her to look for a place for him to sleep. It seems that Stanley is shut out. Starting off, he turns back, in time to keep Phil from laying a hand on her. Finally, he is able to surprise her, giving her a kiss.

The last scene, we see Phil is OK, not really a slow, homeless guy, but more of a con artist. He throws himself in front of a tow truck, just like he had done with Stanley.

== Cast ==
- Luke Wilson as Stanley
- Denise Richards as Diana Evans
- Jay Lacopo as Phil
- Ben Affleck as Michael
- Tim DeKay as Speaker
- David Koechner as Carl
- Phill Lewis as Mitch
- Deborah Theaker as Nancy
- Nicole Sullivan as Sally (uncredited)
- Matt Damon as Kevin (uncredited)
- Lauren Graham as Woman At Party (uncredited)
- Jeff Garlin as Office Worker (uncredited)
- Melissa McCarthy as Marilyn
- Meredith Salenger as Sara
