= Jay Lacopo =

American film actor and screenwriter (born 1963)

Jay Lacopo (born 1963) is an American film actor and screenwriter. He is probably best known for having appeared in and written the script for The Third Wheel (2002), starring Luke Wilson.

He wrote the script for I Killed My Lesbian Wife, Hung Her on a Meat Hook, and Now I Have a Three-Picture Deal at Disney (1993) and the animated movie Bartok the Magnificent from 1999.

== Filmography ==
=== Actor ===
- Turning It Over (2004) as Steve
- The Third Wheel (2002) as Phil
- Crossing Cords (2001) as Leader
- The Godson (1998) as Studio Executive
- General Hospital (1998) as Tom Baker
- Lycanthrophobia (1998) as Frank
- Almost Heroes (1998) as Hector
- Speed 2: Cruise Control (1997) as Real Estate Salesman
- Glory Daze (1996) as The Bus Driver
- Partners as Handsome overcoat, Sir (1 episode, 1995)
- Do We Have to Write You a Check? (1995) TV Episode as Handsome overcoat, Sir
- Home Improvement as Customer (1 episode, 1995)
- A Marked Man (1995) TV Episode as Customer
- Two Guys Talkin' About Girls (1995) (V) as Crazy Man on Phone
- I Killed My Lesbian Wife, Hung Her on a Meat Hook, and Now I Have a Three-Picture Deal at Disney (1993) as The Director

=== Writer ===
- The Third Wheel (2002)
- Bartok the Magnificent (1999)
- I Killed My Lesbian Wife, Hung Her on a Meat Hook, and Now I Have a Three-Picture Deal at Disney (1993)

=== Producer ===
- All Grown Up (2003) (TV)

=== Thanks ===
- There's Something About Mary (1998)
- Good Will Hunting (1997)
