= I Killed My Lesbian Wife, Hung Her on a Meat Hook, and Now I Have a Three-Picture Deal at Disney =

1993 film by Ben Affleck

- Directed by: Ben Affleck
- Written by: Kamala Lopez; Jay Lacopo
- Produced by: Kamala Lopez
- Cinematography: Frank Rieber
- Edited by: Glenn Cooper; David McVeigh
- Distributed by: Heroica Films
- Release date: 1993
- Running time: 16 minutes
- Country: United States
- Language: English

I Killed My Lesbian Wife, Hung Her on a Meat Hook, and Now I Have a Three-Picture Deal at Disney is a 1993 American short satirical film directed by Ben Affleck from a screenplay by Kamala Lopez and Jay Lacopo. The film is Affleck's first directorial effort. The film has received generally negative reviews.

== Plot ==
A cocky director named Ritchie Deaden is casting the lead actress for his first feature film. He discusses the process with his off-screen wife, becoming increasingly angry as he speaks. The director has selected Sandy, a young actress who is under the bed for some reason and will finalise the deal in an upcoming meeting. Meanwhile, Sandy's roommate refuses to let her into their house, as Sandy has failed to pay back a loan. After convincing her roommate that she will pay her back once she gets the part, Sandy enters the house, where she has a phone conversation with her controlling and unsupportive mother. It is revealed that the director's wife is gagged and tied to a meat hook in their living room. The director, a violent misogynist, feels disgraced by his wife's lesbianism. He praises Sandy's qualities, then kills his wife with an axe. The director continues his diatribe, declaring that he will invite Sandy to stay in the house with him while they make the film.

At the final callback, the director and a group of studio executives watch a Hispanic girl audition, but decide she is "too ethnic" for the part. Sandy arrives and begins her audition, following the script. The director intervenes, asking Sandy to improvise a scene in which they play husband and wife. Pleased with her performance, he finalizes the deal. He asks Sandy to take a look at some "migrant trash picker" documents he has in his house; she hesitates but accepts. On her way out the door, Sandy drops several items from her bag, accidentally leaving behind a book. The director picks it up and sees that it is a compendium of A Return to Love and A Woman's Worth by Marianne Williamson.

== Cast ==
- Jay Lacopo as Ritchie Deaden
- Karla Montana as The Actress / Sandy
- Johanna McCloy as The Roommate / Martha
- Robert Koch as Producer No. 1
- Tommy Hinkley as Producer No. 2
- Harry Victor as Producer No. 3
- Marilyn Pitzner as Casting Director
- Harvey Stephens as Casting Assistant
- Ellie Valleau as The Wife
- Maria Dolores Rodriguez Garcia De La Pepa as Hispanic Actress

== Reception ==
The film has received generally negative reviews, with critics contrasting it unfavorably to Affleck's later work.

In 2010, Affleck disowned the film in an interview with Entertainment Weekly: "It's horrible. It's atrocious. I knew I wanted to be a director, and I did a couple of short films, and this is the only one that haunts me. I'm not proud of it. It looks like it was made by someone who has no prospects, no promise."

In 2013, The A.V. Club's Noah Cruickshank wrote that the film "has everything you could possibly want in a campy student project: scenery-chewing, a confusing plot, and shoddy camera work. It looks like Affleck wanted to create a dark comedy that skewers movie-making and life in Hollywood, but veered off into 'so bad it's unintentionally hilarious' territory. ('Do you know much about migrant trash pickers?' is the standout line of the film.) Luckily, Affleck hasn't tarnished his Oscar-winning screenwriting career with I Killed My Lesbian Wife, since he only directed this abomination."
