= Wild Side West =

Bar in San Francisco

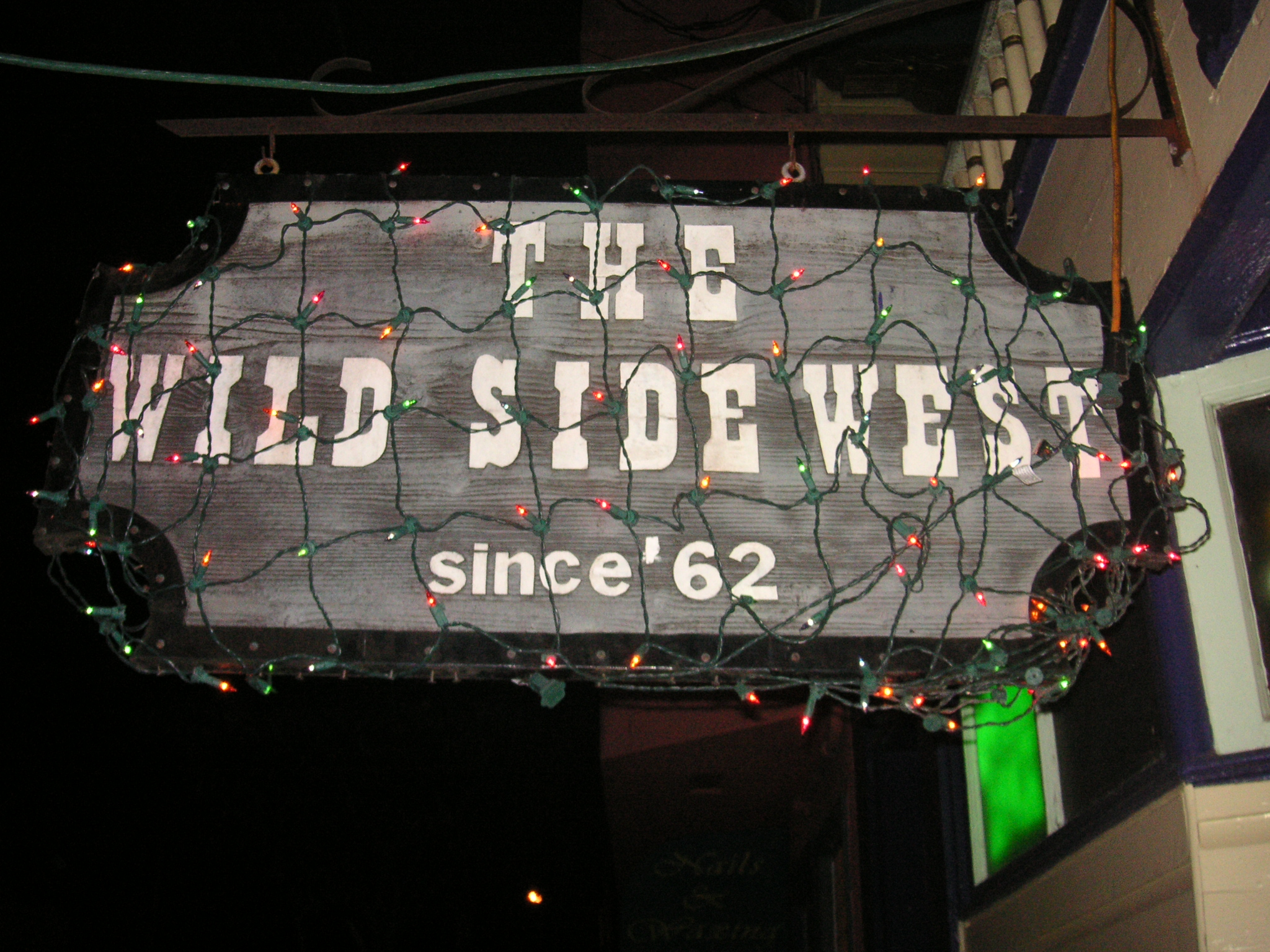
- Wild Side West sign (2006)
- Interactive map of Wild Side West

Restaurant information
- Established: 1962; 64 years ago
- Location: 424 Cortland Avenue, San Francisco, California, United States
- Coordinates: 37.739186°N 122.417194°W

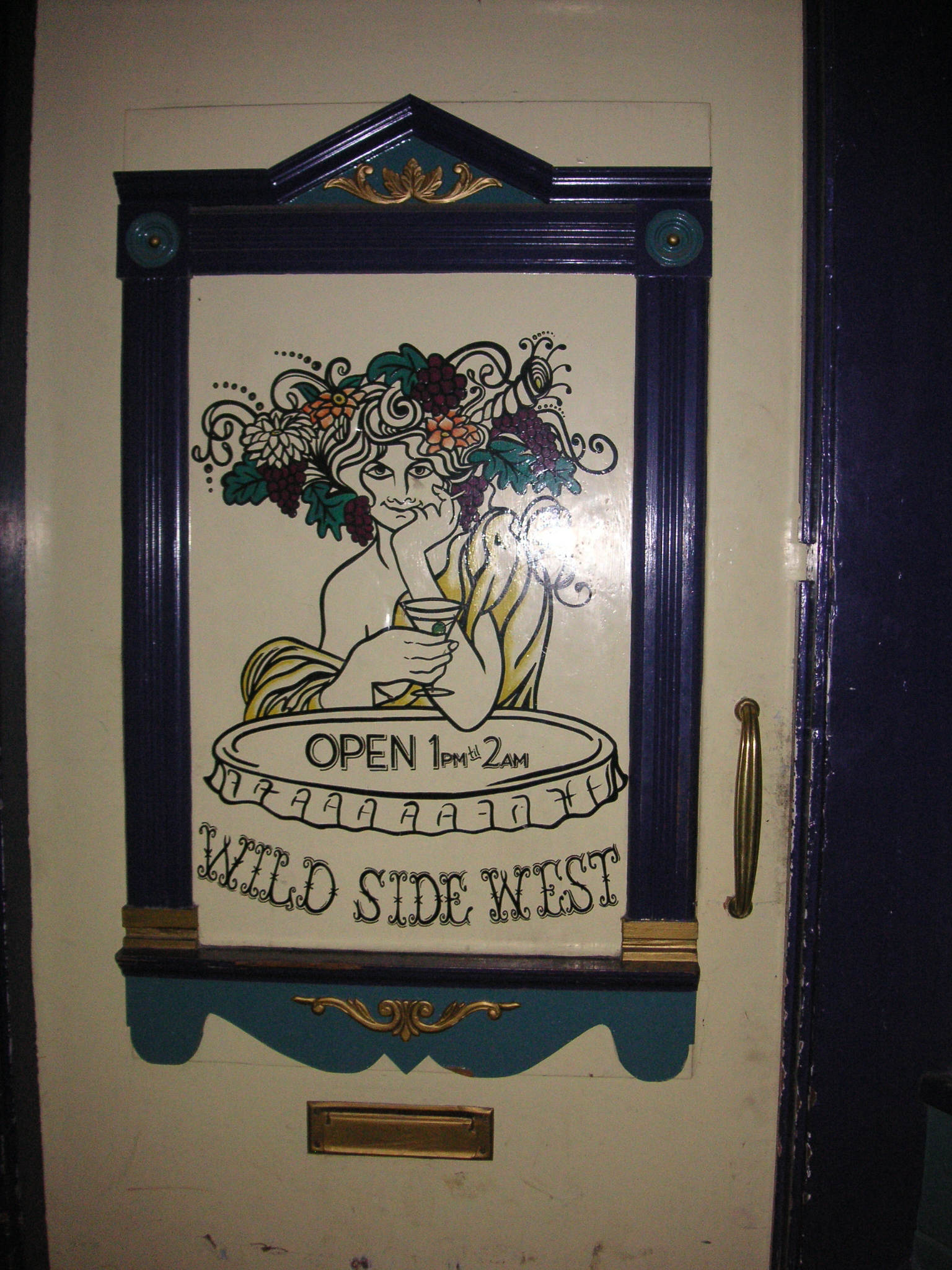
Wild Side West door (2006)

Wild Side West is a historic lesbian bar, founded in 1962 and located in the Bernal Heights neighborhood in San Francisco, California. As of 2021, Wild Side West is San Francisco's last remaining lesbian bar, although the bar currently serves a more diverse Queer crowd much like the nearby El Rio bar.

== History ==
Founded in 1962 by Pat Ramseyer and Nancy White, from 1962 until 1968, the bar was located in Oakland, California. Wild Side West was named after the film Walk on the Wild Side (1962) featuring Barbara Stanwyck. In 1962, it was still illegal for women to be bartenders in California, so the bar existed in rebellion, with women serving the drinks.

From 1968 until 1976, the bar existed in the North Beach neighborhood. During the North Beach-era, the bar was also a refugee for local strippers. In the 1970s, it became known for advancing the careers of female musicians and singers who performed there included Cris Williamson, Ronee Blakley, and the all- women R+B band Sweet Chariot. Ramseyer was also a percussionist who played in the band BeBe K'Roach, and sometimes jammed with fellow musicians in the bar, while Nancy White sang Broadway Show Tunes. The bar also hosted poetry readings by noted poets Kay Boyle, Ruth Weiss, Robert Duncan, and Nanos Valoiritis.

In 1977, Ramseyer and White moved the bar to 424 Cortland Avenue in Bernal Heights and they purchased the 1890s Italianate-style building. Behind the house is a multi-level garden for outdoor meetings, nicknamed Pat's Magical Garden. The garden has many toilets used as planters, these were collected after they were thrown through the bar’s windows in the early years after the move to Cortland Avenue. Notable people that have frequented the bar include Janis Joplin, Joan Baez, Bob Dylan, Madeline Gleason, and others.

Wild Side West has been active in the community and is a venue for community fundraising such as for an annual breast cancer fund Benefit for the Boob, the Bernal Library Art Project, the St. James Infirmary Clinic, and Lyon Martin Health Services.

It has frequently been cited as one of San Francisco's remaining 'historic' bars. In 2013, it was recognized by San Francisco Architectural Heritage Organization on its original list of 25 Legacy bars that have, "intangible significance" that reflect the spirit of the city.

== See also ==
- Lesbian Bar Project
- The Lexington Club
- List of lesbian bars
- Maud's (bar)
