= Beverly Shaw =

- Born: ca. 1910
- Origin: San Francisco, California, United States
- Died: May 1990 (aged 79–80)
- Occupation: Singer

Beverly Shaw (ca. 1910–May 26, 1990) was an American nightclub singer whose career centered on lesbian clubs in California. She was also the owner of a gay nightclub in Los Angeles, California, United States.

== Biography ==
Shaw was from Los Angeles, California. She began her career in San Francisco, California, singing torch songs at the lesbian bar Mona's (where she performed up to the mid 1940s) and the Chi-Chi Club. During World War II, she drove a taxi to support herself and sang as a headliner at Mona's at night.

Shaw moved back to Los Angeles in the early 1950s. There, she sang at the Flamingo Club for a few years before buying her own nightclub in North Hollywood, Club Laurel. She turned Club Laurel into a popular upscale gay night spot catering to the film community and ran it for 14 years. She placed a photograph of herself in the front window of Club Laurel captioned "Miss Beverly Shaw, Sir!", later saying that she borrowed the 'sir' from a Groucho Marx interview with Tallulah Bankhead in which he called her sir. The club's matchbooks were similarly captioned.

Shaw was the Laurel Club's star singer. Her style was influenced by Marlene Dietrich. In either the late 1950s or early 1960s, she produced an album titled "Songs Tailored to Your Taste." The album includes her signature song, "Honeysuckle Rose."

Shaw occasionally sang at other Los Angeles–area venues, including Club Bayou, Linda's Little Log Cabin, Larry Potter's Supper Club, and Joani's Bar.

Shaw was a finalist on the radio show Major Bowes Amateur Hour.

She died of cancer in 1990 at the age of 80.
