= Rikki Streicher =

LGBTQ bar owner and activist (1922–1994)

Rikki Streicher (1922–1994) was an American activist and community leader in San Francisco's LGBTQ movement. In the 1960s, she had an active leadership role in the Society for Individual Rights, an organization that promoted equal rights for gays and lesbians. In 1966, she opened and ran Maud's, a year prior to the San Francisco’s Summer of Love; it stayed open for 23 years, at that time the longest continuously running lesbian-owned lesbian bar in the country. She opened a second bar, Amelia’s, in 1978 in the city’s Mission district, with both venues serving as makeshift community centers for lesbians who had very few accepting socializing options. In the 1980s, she was a co-founder of the international Gay Olympics, later called the Gay Games. She also helped to create the Federation of Gay Games and served on the board of directors. In 1994, she received the Dr. Tom Waddell Award for her contribution to Gay Athletics.

The Rikki Streicher Field, an athletic field and recreation center in San Francisco's Castro District, was named after her.

== Early life ==
Streicher was born in 1922. She served in the military and lived in Los Angeles in the 1940s, where she spent time in the gay bars of that city. She also frequented the gay bars of North Beach in San Francisco. Butch-Femme roles were very fixed at that time. Streicher then identified as butch, and was photographed in 1945 in a widely published image, sitting in Oakland's Claremont Resort with other lesbians, wearing a suit and tie. She worked as an X-ray technician after moving to San Francisco in 1944, then entered restaurant management.

== San Francisco and national activities ==
=== Society for Individual Rights ===
Streicher had an active leadership role in the Society for Individual Rights (SIR), an organization of gay men and lesbians created in San Francisco in 1964 that promoted equal rights for homosexuals, political empowerment, and community building through fundraisers, dances, and classes. By 1966, SIR had established the first public gay community center in the United States, and become the largest homophile organization in the country.

=== Maud's ===
In 1966, Streicher opened Maud's, originally called "Maud's Study", or "The Study", a lesbian bar on Cole St. in the Haight-Ashbury district of San Francisco. The following year, the Haight-Ashbury would become the epicenter of the hippie movement during the 1967 Summer of Love. Maud's, said one historian, served to "bridge the gap between San Francisco's lesbian community and its hippie generation." Because women were not allowed to be employed as bartenders in San Francisco until 1971, Streicher had to either tend bar herself or hire male bartenders. The bar quickly became a popular gathering place for San Francisco lesbians and bisexual women. One notable customer of Maud's was singer Janis Joplin. Activists Del Martin and Phyllis Lyon were also early patrons of Maud's. Maud's remained opened for twenty-three years, becoming at that time the longest continuously running lesbian-owned lesbian bar in the country. In the book Wide Open Town, Nan Amilla Boyd describes Maud's as a "lesbian bar, clubhouse and community center". She highlights the fight of bar owners like Streicher during the 1950s and 1960s to "secure public space for queer people and says many lesbians 'depended on bar life, the central artery of queer life' for their activities.'

The bar and its closing in 1989 were documented in Paris Poirier's internationally distributed film Last Call at Maud's. The film weaves the broader history of lesbian bars in the United States into customers' reminisces about old times. In it, Streicher speculated that increased acceptance of lesbianism in public spaces and a turn towards sobriety brought on by the 1980s AIDS crisis may have been contributing factors to Maud's closing.

=== Amelia's ===
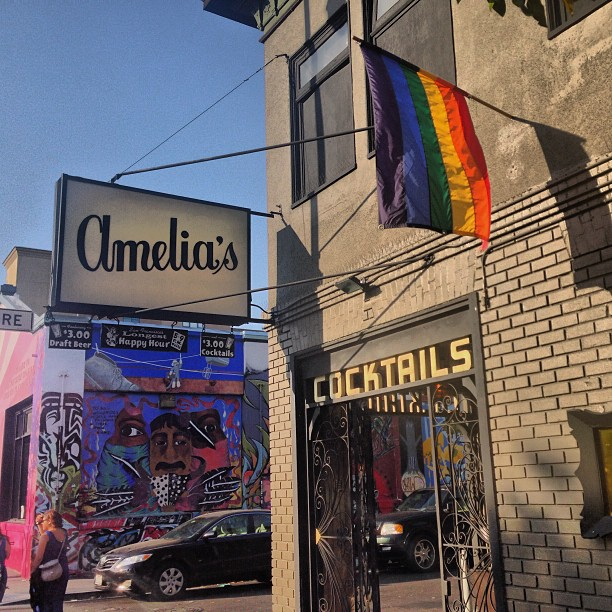
During Pride Week, the Elbo Room replaced their sign with the sign of Amelia's, the former lesbian dance club on 647 Valencia Street, owned by Rikki Streicher from 1978 to 1991.

In 1978, at the height of the disco era, Streicher opened Amelia's, a more spacious bar and dance club at 647 Valencia Street in San Francisco's Mission District, named after Amelia Earhart. The Mission district, and particularly Valencia Street, became a gathering place for lesbians from the 1970s through the early 1990s, and was home to several organizations and businesses that catered to women, including The Women's Building, a non-profit organization; Old Wives Tales, a bookstore; Osento, a woman-only bathhouse; and the Artemis Society, a lesbian club which later became the Artemis Cafe.

Amelia's was open until 1991, when Streicher sold it and it became the Elbo Room bar (the Elbo Room closed in 2018). Its closure signaled a change in how lesbians met and congregated in San Francisco. As Rob Morse of the San Francisco Examiner wrote about Amelia's, "More lesbians than ever live in San Francisco, but...the last lesbian bar in The City, Amelia's, will close." "It's a victim of the lesbian community becoming more diverse," Streicher said, "the 30-and-over lesbian crowd just isn't going out to bars as much anymore. The ones who do tend to go to mainstream bars and clubs." There was no lesbian bar again in San Francisco until the opening of the Lexington Club in 1996 ("The Lex" closed in 2015 as a result of the city's increasing gentrification).

An obituary in The Advocate, published two months after Streicher's death, erroneously reported that Amelia's was called "Amanda's". Every June during Pride Week, the Elbo Room replaced its sign with Amelia's to honor the bar and its lesbian clientele.

=== Gay Olympics ===
Streicher was a passionate promoter of gay and lesbian softball teams and co-founder of the Gay Olympics, later named Gay Games, which started in San Francisco. She helped to create the Federation of Gay Games and served on the board of directors. "Sports are the great social equalizer," she said. "It is perhaps the only time that it does not matter who you are but how you play the game." At the fourth annual Gay Games in New York City in 1994, attended by 55,000 people, she received the Dr. Tom Waddell Award for her contribution to Gay Athletics. She is also listed in the hall of fame for the San Francisco Gay Softball League.

== Death and legacy ==
Streicher died of cancer at age 68 on August 21, 1994. Upon her death, the mayor of San Francisco lowered the city flags to half-mast. The Rikki Streicher Field, an athletic field and recreation center in San Francisco's Castro District, was named after her. Scholars of LGBT history have speculated that the lesbian bars of Streicher's era, which served an important purpose at that time, have closed as the result of gentrification, greater acceptance of lesbians in mainstream society and the popularity of online dating and social media. One writer looking back on the era noted that Streicher and her lesbian bars were instrumental in creating a protective space where lesbian women could come of age and help others do the same:

'Women would call Maud's and say, "I've got a friend who's been abused, can you help?" And everyone would put their heads together to solve the problem. People were very protective of people. That doesn't exist anymore. Rikki Streicher, the owner of Maud's and Amelia's on Valencia, created that environment for 20 years. She was always conscious of being there for the community. Every few months, a new crop would come in and try to figure out how to be, and it felt like we were bringing them up.'
