= Last Call at Maud's =

- Directed by: Paris Poirier
- Produced by: Paris Poirier; Karen Kiss
- Cinematography: Cheryl Rosenthal; Gary Sanders
- Edited by: Paris Poirier; Elaine Trotter
- Music by: Tim Horrigan
- Production company: Maud's Project
- Release date: February 5, 1993 (San Francisco)
- Running time: 77 minutes
- Country: United States

Last Call at Maud's is a 1993 American documentary film directed by Paris Poirier. The film explores the history of lesbian culture from the 1940s to the 1990s as it records the last evening of Maud's, a San Francisco lesbian bar that closed in 1989 after 23 years in operation.

The documentary combines vintage footage with interviews with Maud's owner, Rikki Streicher, its employees, and patrons, including Judy Grahn, Sally Gearhart, Del Martin and Phyllis Lyon.

Last Call at Maud's was shown as a work-in-progress at the San Francisco International Lesbian and Gay Film Festival on June 24, 1992. The film held its world premiere in San Francisco at the Castro Theatre on February 5, 1993; and screened at the 1993 Berlin International Film Festival in the Panorama section.
