= Maud's (bar) =

Lesbian bar in San Francisco

Maud's was a lesbian bar at 937 Cole Street in San Francisco's Cole Valley neighborhood which opened in 1966 and closed in 1989. At the time of its closing, which was captured in the film, Last Call at Maud's, it was claimed to be the oldest lesbian bar in the United States. Its history, documented in the film and other media, spanned almost a quarter-century of LGBTQ events.

== History ==
=== 1960s ===
Maud's was opened in 1966 by Rikki Streicher, a San Francisco lesbian and gay rights activist who would later go on to open another women's bar, Amelia's, and become a co-founder of the Gay Games. It was originally called "The Study", and later "Maud's Study." As women were not allowed to be employed as bartenders in California until 1971, Streicher hired male bartenders and tended the bar herself. Streicher stated about the creation of Maud's, "I've always felt that bars were the most honest, open, free place that women could go," and that she founded Maud's with a "no labels" policy, welcoming women who did not fit the butch/femme dress and manners code preferred by some other lesbian bars."

In 1967, the Haight-Ashbury became the center of the hippie movement's Summer of Love, bringing in new cultural mores with a new generation of lesbian and bisexual women, some of whom became regulars at Maud's. One patron of the bar was legendary singer Janis Joplin, who would visit Maud's with her lover Jae Whitaker. Other notable patrons of that era were Del Martin and Phyllis Lyon, poet Judy Grahn, and academic and activist Sally Gearhart. Maud's, said historian Nan Alamilla Boyd, was a "clubhouse, community center and bar" that served to "bridge the gap between San Francisco's lesbian community and its hippie generation."

In her memoir Making Butch, Sue-Ellen Case describes her first visit to Maud's in 1966:

I pushed open its plain black door to discover two dimly light rooms. The long bar occupied the first room. It was illuminated by various neon ads for beers, the warm, orange light from the juke box, and the garish surround of the pinball machine. The other room afforded a central view of the pool table, with its low-hanging lamp and a few tables along the walls. The old butch-femme scene hunkered down at the end of the bar itself, while a few hippie dykes straggled in to sit at the tables. ... The two groups eyed each other with suspicion.

Another former patron, trans woman Suzan Cooke, remembers how police cars would park near the bar to intimidate its patrons:

[One night] I was coming back from this place, and I was wearing a black leather jacket and boots and jeans and a turtleneck t-shirt. Semi-longish hair ... Then the good old Tac squad boys came rolling along. And sometimes they would — well, later they pretty much always would — park a cop car right outside Maud's. Or near Maud's, as a form of intimidation ... They had the cameras out. Because there was still at this time a "let's keep track of the queers" mentality.

=== 1970s ===
With the Stonewall riots of 1969, the gay liberation era had begun, and LGBTQ people flocked to San Francisco, which was rapidly becoming a "gay mecca' for young people looking for a place to be themselves. While many gay men moved to the Castro district, many women were attracted to the lower rents of Valencia Street in the Mission District, creating businesses and non-profit organizations. "By the mid-1970s," writes historian John D'Emilio, "San Francisco had become, in comparison with the rest of the country, a liberated zone for lesbians and gay men.

Women's bars like Maud's, explained ex-patron Cheryl Gonzales in an oral history, "were communities. They were families ... there was a cliquish component also, but there was a real sense of belonging. If you were having problems in your personal life or if you couldn't make your rent. ... people would really rally together. If someone had, ie. breast cancer or something, people would set up funds." "For gay men and lesbians", wrote LGBT historians Johnson and Summers, "the centrality of bars to community life has probably been truer than it has for any other community group." Other San Francisco lesbian bars of the 1970s, included Peg's Place, which initially had a dress code and drew a more conservative crowd, Scott's Pitt, home to "leather-clad motorcycle women and old school dykes", Wild Side West, which started in the bohemian era of North Beach, Leonarda's, with a strong butch-femme culture, Amelia's, and A Little More, both dance clubs which drew a varied crowd.

In the late 70's, Maud's and its sister bar Amelia's formed the first women's softball teams in the growing Gay Softball League. As other lesbian bars in the San Francisco Bay Area created their own teams, bars competed against each other on public playgrounds, while fans gathered to root for their teams, and the winning bar hosted drinks for everyone afterwards. Pool tournaments were another social activity that bar patrons participated in. Maud's also hosted variety shows, poetry readings, and a bowling team.

Writer Judy Grahn recalls how, during the 1970s movement of second wave feminism, she tried to bridge the gap between old-school lesbians and a newer more politicized generation by putting a political bookrack in Maud's to generate discussion: "While we hoped that people would sober up and turn the bar into a place of political discussion and interaction, instead, everything heated up socially as more and more women came out and joined the lesbian subculture."

Despite the plethora of lesbian bars and the 70's wave of gay and feminist liberation, Maud's bartender and later bar manager Susan Fahey remembers that the bar was once closed by an undercover police officer who saw a woman touching another woman's neck and recalls that as late as 1976, she would flick the lights on and off to warn patrons that the police were coming and to make sure no touching was going on. The Briggs Initiative, which would have prevented gay people from teaching in public schools, the election of Harvey Milk as the city's first gay supervisor and his subsequent assassination, and the 1978 attack on Peg's Place by off-duty members of the San Francisco Police were all issues that affected the San Francisco gay community, and the lesbian patrons of Maud's, during that time.

=== 1980s ===
In the 1980s, as the AIDS crisis devastated the gay community of San Francisco, more gay and lesbian bar patrons began to adopt a 'clean and sober' lifestyle and look for other ways to meet each other. Organizations like the Bay Area Career Women offered lesbian professionals other social and networking venues. The eighties also saw the emergence of Lipstick lesbians and a turn away from the androgyny of the 70's back towards a butch-femme aesthetic. Women began to look for nightclubs where they could dress up and show off. More exclusive, upscale clubs for queer and bisexual women like Clementina's Baybrick Inn, which offered a hostel and cabaret entertainment, provided alternatives to the neighborhood bar of the 60's and 70's. Maud's, however, continued to attract its regulars as well as new patrons. Democratic politician Carole Migden began her political career when she decided to run for city supervisor during a conversation at Maud's.

Then, in 1989, after twenty-three years in business, owner Rikki Streicher announced that the bar would close. In addition to the trend towards sobriety, and the growing availability of establishments and organizations where women could meet, Maud's once free-wheeling, countercultural clientele "had gotten more middle class, moved to the suburbs, and bought houses." and business had deteriorated as a result.

== Depictions in culture and media ==
On September 9, 1989, Maud's served its last drink. The event was documented in Paris Poirier's 1993 film Last Call at Maud's, which featured interviews with Streicher, bar manager Susan Fahey, and some of the bartenders, as well as patrons Del Martin, Phyllis Lyon, Judy Grahn, and Sallie Gearhard, and others. The film blends their reminiscences of Maud's with vintage footage to look at Maud's in the context of the history of lesbian bars from the 1940s through the 1980s. Patrons, known as "Maudies", reflect on the fun they had, the secretive and outlaw nature of lesbian bars, the bars' role in women's and LGBT history, and their capacity to change lives. The film was screened internationally and received positive reviews from press that included The New York Times, the Village Voice, Variety, and the Toronto Star. "What makes Last Call at Maud's so interesting," notes the Village Voice, "are the intersection of the sweep of history with the smallness of one social circle. It's as if the cultural moment and the tiny bar stand off, each alternately throwing down a card across the notion of history, each card changing the game. "

In 1979, Sue Ellen Case wrote a play about Mauds called Jo: A Lesbian History Play, which was staged at the Julian Theater in San Francisco. In the 1990s, Case wrote about Maud's in her essay "Making Butch", which looked back on the 1970s as she had experienced it with the bar as "her central training ground". While acknowledging the valuable qualities of community bar life, the essay also discusses its addictive elements, as well as race relations and evolving gender roles. 'I watched lots of people drop out, go on welfare, or gain some kind of disability pay in order to live their whole lives there.' Case says. 'Why not? It was painful to live under the dominating culture.' She described the bar as a place "where lifestyle politics met closeted, ghettoized behavior, where middle class drop-outs, students and sometimes professionals met working class people who had slim, but tenacious hopes of doing better; where the 'sexual revolution' broke the code of serial monogamy, where costume and hallucination affronted sober dress codes and drink."

In Wide Open Town: A History of Queer San Francisco to 1965, Nan Alamilla Boyd discusses how homophile organizations like the Daughters of Bilitis were created in the early 60's to attempt to bring lesbians more into mainstream society, while bars like Maud's evolved to provide queer women a distinct space of their own. She describes Maud's as" a central gathering spot for a new and counter-cultural generation of lesbians for over twenty years."

== Historical context ==
Observers of LGBT culture have noted that lesbian bars, a common feature of the LGBT landscape in the 20th century, were disappearing in the 21st century. Reasons given range from gentrification to rejection of gender binaries to social media and online dating to less of a need for exclusive lesbian spaces as LGBT people are more accepted in society at large.

After Streicher sold the establishment, a group of Maud's patrons held regular reunions in the bar, now called Finnegans Wake. In June 2016, they gathered for the 50th anniversary of Maud's opening. Some at the reunion said they were motivated to attend by the recent shootings at a gay nightclub in Orlando, Florida. In the 1970s, one patron recalled, going to a gay bar "was an act of courage. Now we are full circle where going to gay bars has become an act of courage again." Another remembered Maud's as "a special place" that "will never be repeated." It was, the organizers said, their last reunion.

== See also ==
- LGBT culture in San Francisco
- The Lexington Club
- Mona's 440 Club
- Peg's Place
