= Esta Noche (gay bar) =

Gay bar in San Francisco, California, USA (1979–2014)

Este Noche
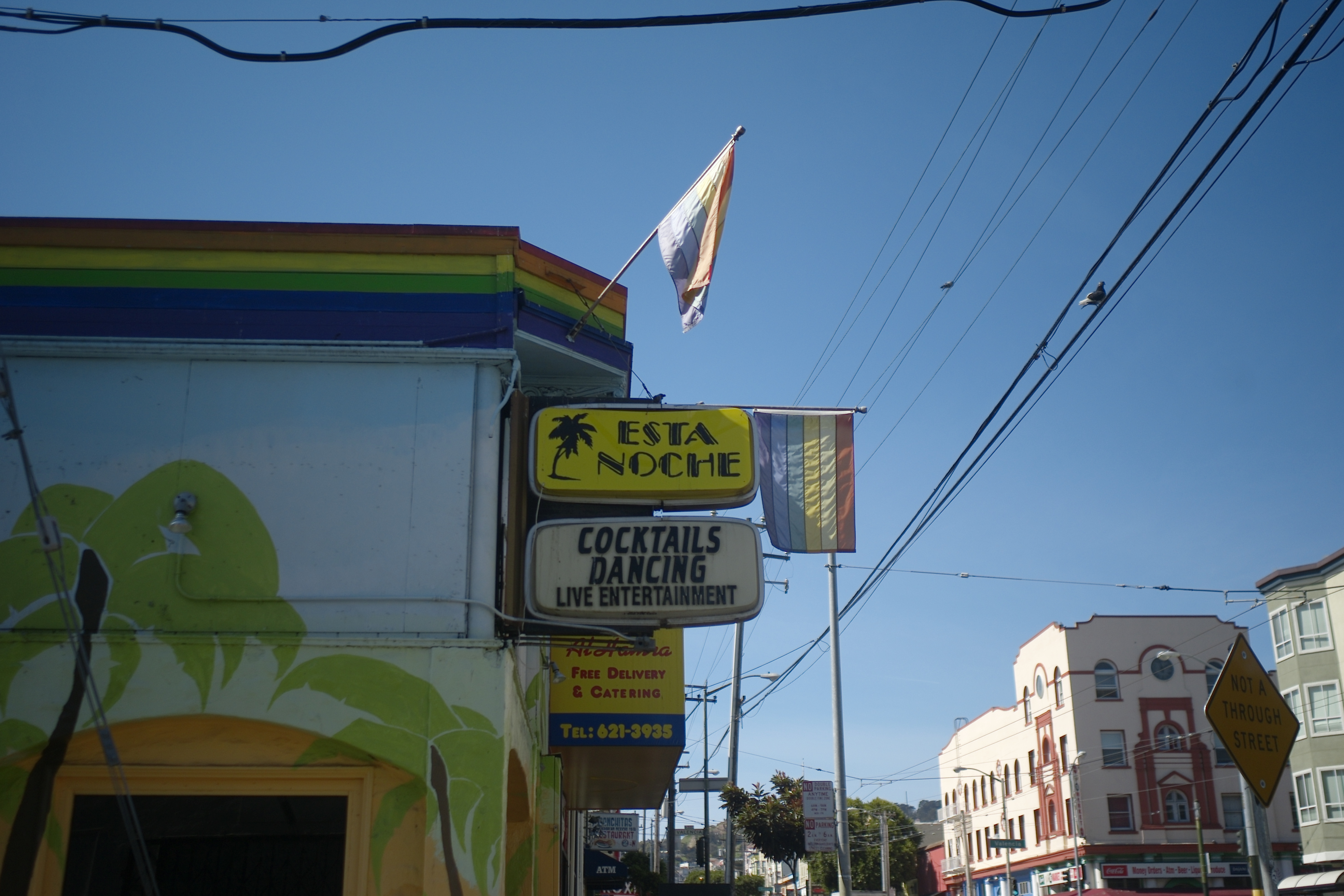
- Side view of Esta Noche from March 2008
- Interactive map of Este Noche

Restaurant information
- Established: 1979
- Closed: 2014
- Previous owners: Anthony Lopez; Manuel Quijano
- Location: 3079 16th Street, Mission District, San Francisco, California, United States
- Coordinates: 37.85746941419939°N 122.40809885090044°W

Esta Noche (English: Tonight) was the first Latino gay bar in San Francisco. It operated from 1979 to 2014, and was located at 3079 16th Street between Valencia Street and Mission Street in San Francisco, California.

It was attractive to many Latino individuals in the community because it provided a space to drink, party, engage in hookup culture, organize and perform. Esta Noche was also a place where people of other races and ethnicities could embrace Hispanic culture and engage in interracial relations. The bar first opened in 1979 and was the last Latino bar standing on 16th Street by 1997. After 30 years of operation, Esta Noche closed in 2014 as a result of increased rent and property taxes caused by gentrification.

== History ==
Esta Noche was founded by two gay community members, Anthony Lopez and Manuel Quijano.

It is historically placed as the first gay Latino bar in San Francisco, and it has significance due to the discrimination LGBTQ+ people of color faced in traditionally popular white gay bars, especially in the Castro district. LGBTQ+ people of color often experienced racial slurs, microaggressions, and fetishization, as the bars where LGBTQ+ people were able to socialize and party were mostly dominated by white men. LGBTQ+ people of color were often asked to show multiple forms of identification in these spaces. These experiences led to the creation of Esta Noche. The co-founder of the group Gay American Indians (GAI), Randy Burns, said that the frustration at this discrimination was also what led his group to form, and members often met at Esta Noche.

Lopez and Quijano struggled to open the bar at first as a result of discriminatory practices. Minorities in the area found it very difficult to obtain liquor licenses and/or permits. The pair hired an attorney to dispute the unconstitutional practices and were able to secure the needed permits to open Esta Noche.

Esta Noche also has its roots in the Gay Latino Alliance (GALA), as one of the GALA members sold their house to buy the bar. GALA and Esta Noche worked together in advertising the space as the gay Latino bar of the Mission District in San Francisco, which ultimately resurfaced tensions that the organization was dealing with. With the establishment of Esta Noche came the shift of gay Latino representation from GALA to the bar life.

== Culture ==
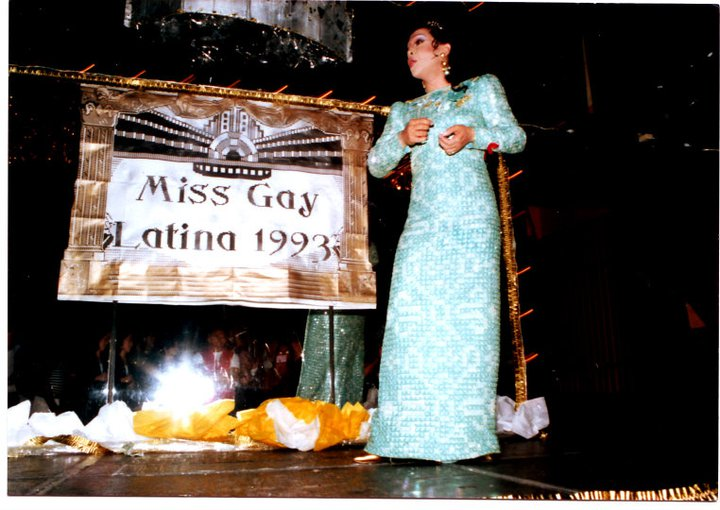
Adela Vázquez passing on her crown of Miss Gay Latina in 1993

Esta Noche is defined as a "working-class" bar. The bar did more than serving people looking for a good time; it also provided an important space for those seeking to network with other LGBTQ+ people of color. Esta Noche has been defined as a "community organizing center and host to many fundraisers for health clinics, people with AIDS, and other lower-income populations."

The bar gave room for comedy nights where famous Latina comedian Marga Gomez starred. The bar held Mr. and Miss Gay Latino contests and a Mr. Latin Leather competition that began in 2007. This contest was part of the many Pride Events hosted in San Francisco during Pride month. The nightclub also hosted other contests such as the "Putting on the Lips" contest. This contest was a lip-sync contest where participants, either dressed in or not in drag, competed against each other. A lot of talented Latino people joined the contest to try to win the $150 prizes. Esta Noche was famously known for their drag shows; there were sometimes even six shows a week. A popular drag show was the Selena nights, in which drag queens dressed and performed as Selena. Adela Vázquez, a popular Cuban American transgender performer, activist, and local to San Francisco's gay scene was crowned Miss Gay Latina in 1992 and was often seen at Esta Noche. Another notable person that Esta Noche collaborated with was Diane Felix. People who went to the bar recalled it as a space where people of color, Latinos in particular, could come together and have a space where they would not receive racist discrimination or homophobia.

The bar also helped facilitate connections, pride, and identity within each visitor. Esta Noche and its visitors shaped each other to develop the concept of sexuality and redefined the term "Latino/a". The bar served as a site that encouraged the mixing of gender, age, and class favoring discussions about similarities and differences for these topics among the visitors.

== Contributions to the LGBTQ Community ==
=== Community impact ===
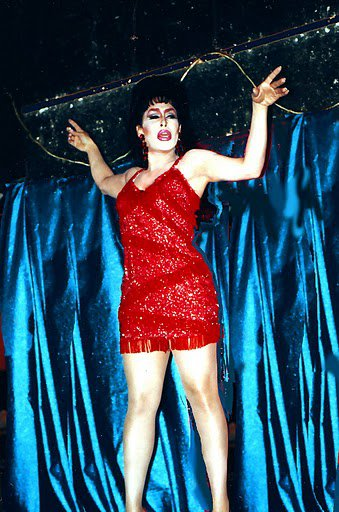
Adela Vázquez performing at Esta Noche

Esta Noche has a rich and important history to Latinos and gays in San Francisco. As one of the first public spaces for gay Latinos, it holds a special significance to many community members. It was a space where queer Latinos could be themselves, speak their language, and listen to their music. A San Francisco native and regular at Esta Noche notes the bars popularity to new immigrants in the area looking for places where they can feel like themselves and the attractiveness it had to young lost Latinos as a place to have fun and come out in the night time. It was also attractive to those seeking cross-racial interactions. Even non-members of the Latino community recognized the distinct atmosphere provided by Esta Noche. Tim Speck, a gay white man living in the Mission district, speaks about his experience living in the Latino district after being sick of living in predominantly white neighborhoods. He explains his frustration being surrounded by the anglo gay lifestyle and his attraction to the exotic and sexual energy provided by Esta Noche.

Esta Noche served as a place for Latinos to embrace and be open about their sexuality and gender preferences. Vivian Lopez in an interview from the GLBT Historical Society describes her first time at Esta Noche and her first time seeing a man dressed as a woman. She was a mere nineteen years old and saw her first performance at the bar. Seeing the transsexual dancer reminded her of her childhood fantasies and when she would dress in secret. She too wanted to look like the performer. Just one night at Esta Noche inspired Vivian to begin her transition. Vivian's story is one of many in the impact Esta Noche had on closeted and afraid LGBTQ+ people of color.

=== Response to the AIDS crisis ===
As Esta Noche was opening, San Francisco was already seeing a significant spread in HIV among the gay community. Quijano recognized the lack of education and difficulty and stigma around the topic particularly for Latinos. Esta Noche promoted safe sex by distributing condoms and held AIDS fundraising events. The nightclub also distributed condoms by the initiative started by the SAP (Stop AIDS Project) foundation. In total, the nightclub distributed more than 17,700 condoms which helped promote the practice of safe sex and limited the spread of AIDS. Esta Noche even started hosting Mr. and Miss Safe Latino competitions to advocate for safe sex practices.

After being crowned Miss Gay Latina, Adela Vazquez quickly began her outreach surrounding health disparities among the trans community. Vázquez collaborated with other drag queens to form Las AtreDivas, which organized and performed at Esta Noche. They highlighted safe sex practices bringing awareness to AIDS and to raise funds for local organizations.

Teresita La Campesina (1940–2002) was a Mexican trans ranchera singer, who often appeared at Esta Noche. La Campesina had contracted HIV in the early 1990s, she was vocal about the disease and worked with Proyecto ContraSIDA Por Vida. During her vocal performances she would often sing about HIV prevention.

The club also hosted "We Will Survive: The 10th Anniversary Safe Sex Show". The show starred Alexis Miranda, Empress XXXIII and friends. The event was part of the 6th Latino/a AIDS Theater Festival event hosted by LLEGO California to help raise funds to fight the crisis.

Another fundraiser hosted by the nightclub was for the Salvadoran AIDS/gay rights organization to raise funds for the Oscar Romero Project. This project aimed to establish a cultural center for the LBGTQ+ community in San Salvador. The fundraiser featured performances by Metamorphosis and a raffle prize to help raise money for the fundraiser. Esta Noche also hosted the A Gift For Christmas featuring Sonny Padilla Jr. The goal of the event was to raise funds to help the patients at Ward 5B at the San Francisco General Hospital. Ward 5B was the 1st AIDs Wards ever created to treat/help patients with AIDS.

=== Recognition ===
Esta Noche was nominated for the San Francisco Pride Marshalls. However, they lost to the Billy DeFrank LGBT Community Center in San Jose, California. They were running against the UCSF Positive Health Program.

Esta Noche was featured in the HBO series Looking for 2 seasons. By the recording of the second season in November 2014, the bar was already closed.

Esta Noche was the focus of a 1994 documentary directed by Tina Valentin Aguirre and Augie Robles. The film, "Viva 16" highlights the LatinX queer culture that was built in San Francisco against what was otherwise predominately white neighborhoods. It showcases the community of the Mission district from the 1970s to the 1990s pre-gentrification.

== Celebrations ==
The nightclub celebrated their annual anniversary every year until their closing in 2014. The club hosted anniversary Fiestas with drinks and prizes to celebrate the success of Esta Noche. The club also hosted 4 July celebrations. In 1982 the club hosted a Star-Spangled Variety Show which featured multiple gay latino artists such as Daniel Genera. Esta Noche hosted New Years Eve parties where they offered free champagne from 8 pm to 2 am for the visitors.

== Closing ==
In 2013, Esta Noche was threatened with closure, after the San Francisco Board of Supervisors adopted new laws related to licensing and permit fees. The bar needed to raise $9,000 to keep going, and the club launched a crowdfunding campaign on Indiegogo. However, it was unable to secure enough funds to stay open. In early 2014, it was announced the club was closing down. The closing was treated as a significant loss to community members, and the bar was generally perceived as another victim of gentrification. Many efforts were made to stop the closing of the bar; for example the "queens of San Francisco drag queens, Heklina and Anna Conda spearheaded a fundraiser to try to save the venue in May 2014. However, they were unable to save the bar. The closing of the bar has been tied to the increasing of property tax in the area, which has caused gentrification. Gentrification has also affected many other Latino bars, which have had to close.

Bond, another night club, subsequently sat in place of Esta Noche. When the new owners of the space bought the property, they ran the space as a Limbo Bar for 2 months. The purpose of this was to allow frequent visitors and supporters of Esta Noche to officially say goodbye to the bar. In 2023, after the closing of Bond, the venue reopened under new ownership as Mother Bar, catering to queer women.

Esta Noche's important history and significance to gays and Latinos continues. In 2017, Esta Noche was part of an urban project by Xandra Ibarra, The Hook Up/Displacement/Barhopping/Drama Tour was an effort to revive 5 sites of queer displacement and gentrification in San Francisco. A 4 minute video of clips from Esta Noche's past was projected onto the bar which replaced Esta Noche.

== Criticism ==
The bar faced criticism for its atmosphere inside the building. The bar was deemed disreputable, sleazy, and shady by some patrons because of its small dark space that was badly ventilated. Others described the place as having bad smells such as the smell of pee. Visitors to the nightclub have been very vocal about their concerns with the club on the nightclub's Yelp page. The nightclub had issues of crimes that occurred outside the property. On October 6, 1995, an attack occurred across the street from Esta Noche. The assailant attacked an 18 year-old gay man causing one of his eyes to be permanently blind. Authorities believed the attack was fueled by homophobia. The club was often the target for homophobic attacks because of its status as a gay bar. Closer to the opening of the club, a visitor named George Jalbeert expressed their distaste for losing their jacket that they checked in before entering the building. Jalbeert expressed their desire to take the nightclub to court for not getting reimbursed and their sadness for getting ripped off by the gay nightclub. Also, the female bartenders and lesbian visitors faced harassment at the club causing them to be further excluded from GALA meetings held at Esta Noche. This lead Diana Flores to create Colors, a club that aimed to create a safe space for lesbian Latinas.

== See also ==
- LGBT culture in San Francisco
- List of LGBTQ bars
- Racism in the LGBT community
- Redz Bar, historic lesbian Latino bar in Los Angeles
