= Proyecto ContraSIDA por Vida =

HIV prevention agency in San Francisco

Proyecto ContraSIDA Por Vida (also known as PCPV and Proyecto) was a non-profit HIV-prevention agency located in the Mission District of San Francisco that provided community-based healthcare for the Latino/a and LGBT communities. It was one of several community-based health organizations that emerged in response to the AIDS crisis. Proyecto ContraSIDA por Vida emerged from a variety of organizations that aimed at reducing the spread of HIV in communities of color. Some of the predecessor organizations of PCPV were the National Task Force on AIDS Prevention (NTFAP), the Gay Latino Alliance (GALA), and Community United in Responding to AIDS/SIDA (CURAS), among others. Some of the leaders who came together to create PCPV included Ricardo Bracho, Diane Felix, Jesse Johnson, Hector León, Reggie Williams, and Martín Ornellas-Quintero.

== Contributions to activist methodologies ==
Three components distinguished PCPV's unique contribution to LGBT organizations and AIDS advocacy efforts: a commitment to multi-gender organizing, sex-positive programming, and principles of harm reduction. Operated from 1993 to 2005, the agency had emerged from the CURAS (Community Responding to AIDS/SIDA) and targeted those under-served by existing HIV-prevention resources, including transgender women, Spanish-speaking immigrants, Latino youth, and neighborhood sex workers.

PCPV was committed to new forms of community building. It promoted health education by addressing differences in age, language, class, immigrant status, and gender. Its dynamic approach to community engagement, education, and outreach was inspired by Paulo Freire, the Centre for Contemporary Cultural Studies at the University of Birmingham, ACT-UP, and El movimiento de liberación gay based in Mexico City.

PCPV's approach, programming, and materials were characterized by multilingualism, neologism, bold social marketing, and enacting cultural fluency. Organized as a constellation of community agents committed to creative care-taking and activist intervention, PCPV served as a springboard for many notable Latinx artists, activists, academics, and allies. The distinctive tone of its mission statement, drafted by Chicano playwright Ricardo Bracho, captures the multi-lingual flavor and political urgency of the group's radical vision:

Proyecto ContraSIDA is coming to you—you joto, you macha, you vestigial, you queer, you femme, you girls and boys and boygirls and girlboys de ambiente, con la fé and fearlessness that we can combat AIDS, determine our own destinos, and love ourselves and each other con dignidad, humor, y lujuria.

This mission statement recognizes the complex and culturally specific ways in which people identify their gender and sexuality. The organization's name includes references to two important concepts in Chicana/o street culture, "con safos", often written as C/S, and por vida, often written as P/V.

== Scholarly attention ==
PCPV's model of innovative community engagement attracted the attention of several scholars, some of whom had formal and informal ties to the organization. University of California, Berkeley professor, Juana María Rodríguez devotes a chapter of her book Queer Latinidad: Identity Practices, Discursive Spaces to the organization, focusing on its inventive use of linguistic and visual practices, and outlining how PCPV organizing practices challenged existing identity-based models of community engagement. Oral historian Horacio Roque Ramirez documents the lives of numerous PCPV members including Diane Felix, and outlines the related cultural and social movements that contributed to its formation, in his 2001 dissertation "Communities of Desire: Queer Latina/Latino History and Memory, San Francisco Bay Area, 1960-1990s" and in numerous other articles. In 2004, Jaime Cortez produced a bilingual graphic novel, Sexilio/Sexile about Adela Vazquez and credits "the diasporic folk of Proyecto Village" with the inspiration for that project.

Several healthcare advocates have also noted the importance of the PCPV's approach to community well-being and HIV prevention, stressing the impact of its "bottom-up" approach, and its ability to reach and serve marginalized communities. After PCPV closed, several of its staff and volunteers went on to create El/La Para TransLatinas, an organization dedicated to supporting and advocating for transgender Latinas.

The archives of PCPV are currently held in the Ethnic Studies Library at the University of California, Berkeley.

== People ==
Organized as a constellation of community agents committed to creative care and activist intervention, PCPV served as a springboard for many notable queer Latinx artists, activists, academics, and allies, including Juana María Rodríguez, Marcia Ochoa, Ricardo Bracho, Diane Felix, Horacio Roque Ramirez, Adela Vazquez, Jaime Cortez, Jorge Ignacio Cortiñas, Aurora Guerrero, Patrick "Pato" Hebert, Al Lujan, Wura-Natasha Ogunji, Teresita La Campesina, Gigi Otalvaro-Hormillosa, Nao Bustamante, Veronica Majano, Valentin "Tina" Aguirre, Alexandra Rodríguez DeRuiz, and Janelle Rodríguez.
