= Adela Vázquez =

Cuban-American transgender activist and performer (1958–2024)

Adela Vazquez
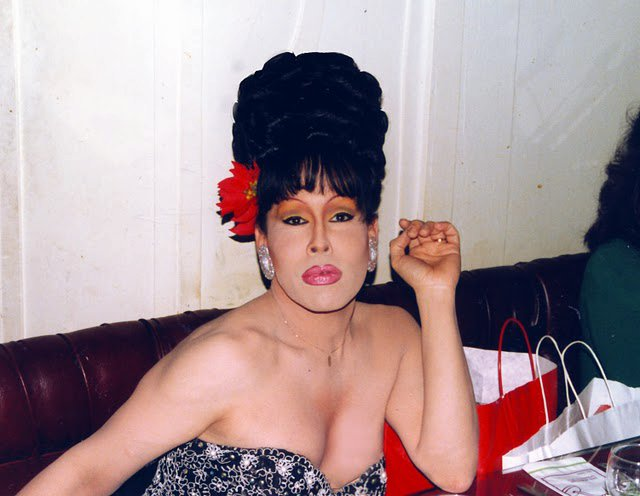
- Vázquez in December 1991 on Christmas
- Born: November 13, 1958; Camagüey, Cuba
- Died: October 11, 2024
- Organization: Proyecto ContraSIDA por Vida // Instituto Familiar De La Raza
- Known for: Transgender activist, Outreach Coordinator at Proyecto ContraSIDA por Vida

Adela Vázquez (November 13, 1958 – October 11, 2024) was a Cuban-American transgender activist and performer. Hailing from Cuba during a time of political uprising, Vázquez was one of 125,000 people who sought asylum and migrated in the Mariel Boat lifts in 1980. Local to San Francisco's gay scene, Vázquez began to organize with HIV prevention organization Proyecto ContraSIDA Por Vida (also known as PCPV, or Proyecto) and became a community activist for transgender rights.

== Early life ==
In 1958, Fidel Castro organized the July 26th Movement to overthrow Fulgencio Batista. Vázquez was born in 1958, and during her birth, homes were burned and cities were destroyed because of the revolution. Vázquez was born out of wedlock and was adopted by her grandfather and grandmother, with whom she lived.

Raised in Camagüey, Cuba, Vázquez spent her childhood walking around downtown and the Casino Campreste. She encountered a large Cuban LGBTQ community, eventually being baptized as "La Chica Streisandisima" at the swan fountain in Casino Campreste.

Her early involvement with the LGBTQ community in Camagüey and emigration to the United States was the influence for Jaime Cortez's graphic novel Sexile.

In Cuba, Vázquez was inducted into the military but was ineligible for service because of her homosexuality. After being denied, Vázquez committed herself to education and worked toward her teaching degree at Destacamento Pedagogico Manuel Ascunce Domenech.

== Migration ==
On April 4 of 1980, Castro's government announced that any Cuban wanting to leave to the United States was free to go. Castro did this in response to five Cubans who stole a bus and crashed into the Embassy of Peru in Havana, seeking asylum.

Vázquez was one of the people who sought asylum as part of the Mariel Boatlift and emigrated to Florida. Leaving behind family and belongings, Vázquez departed from the port of El Mosquito, a beach she recalled as unsafe and overcrowded. Her experiences on the Mariel boat for eight hours were less positive until she docked at the island of Key West, Monroe County, Florida.

Vázquez was moved to the Cuban refugee center of Fort Chaffee in the city of Fort Smith, Arkansas and recalls being greeted by the Ku Klux Klan that surrounded the center. Spending a month and half there, Vazquez's experience were generally positive as she recalled the center providing adequate healthcare, churches, and food for refugees.

In 1980, Vázquez was sponsored by the Los Angeles LGBT Center to travel to California. In Los Angeles, she met Rolando Victoria who would become her drag godmother until Victoria's death in 1982. While in California, Vazquez took jobs as a gift wrapper for Neiman Marcus, a hairdresser, and hotel clerk after she moved in 1983 to the Tenderloin district in San Francisco.

== Activism ==
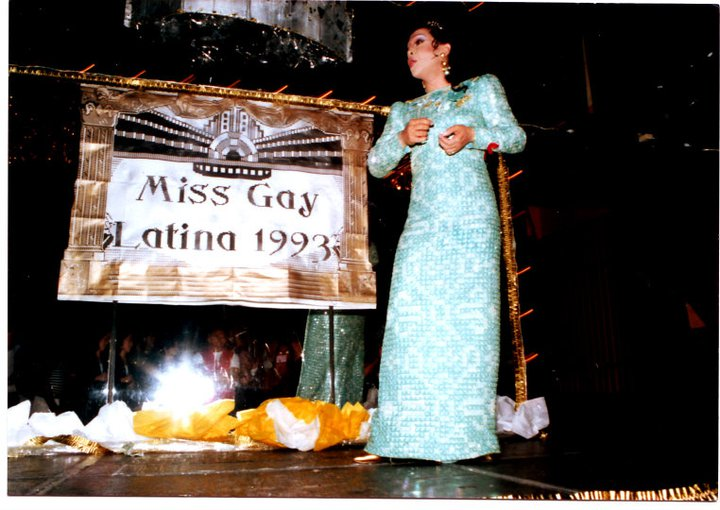
Adela giving away her crown of Miss Gay Latina at Esta Noche (gay bar)

Vázquez's activist work began in 1992 when she was crowned Miss Gay Latina, by Instituto Familiar De La Raza—a community based health and wellness center. Post her crowning, Vázquez began to organize around transgender rights and issues. She quickly took notice of the large health disparities in the trans community and the need to mobilize. Vázquez was invited by trans activist Tamara Ching to speak to the issues the trans Latina community faced at the Human Rights Commission at San Francisco's City Hall. Among her many efforts, Vázquez protested the employment discrimination faced by trans people and their removal from the workplace because of their gender queerness.

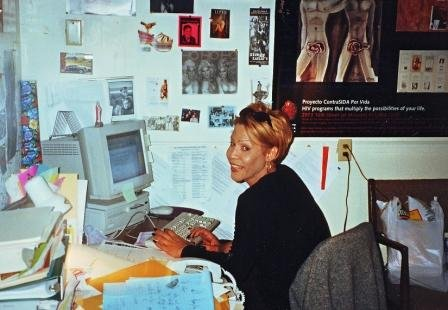
Adela in 1995 at Proyecto ContraSIDA por Vida

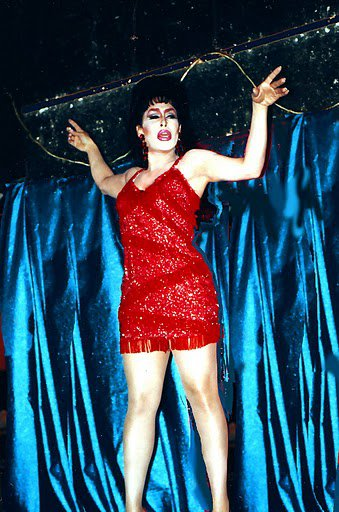
Adela performing at Esta Noche (gay bar)

Through her outreach, Vázquez met a drag queen by the name of La Condonera "The Condom Women," otherwise known as Hector León. Together, Hector and Vázquez formed a group called Las AtreDivas (a portmanteau of the Spanish word atrevida—daring—and diva), which consisted of four drag queens. Las AtreDivas organized and presented on Spanish language shows at the gay bar Esta Noche, highlighting safer sex practices in order to bring awareness to AIDS and contribute funds for local organizations like Proyecto ContraSIDA Por Vida. She is credited with being the first Trans Latina employed to address issues of HIV in San Francisco. Vázquez, also known by her drag name "Adela Holyday" was called a "top notch "drag" performer" and an "aesthetic marker" at night clubs.

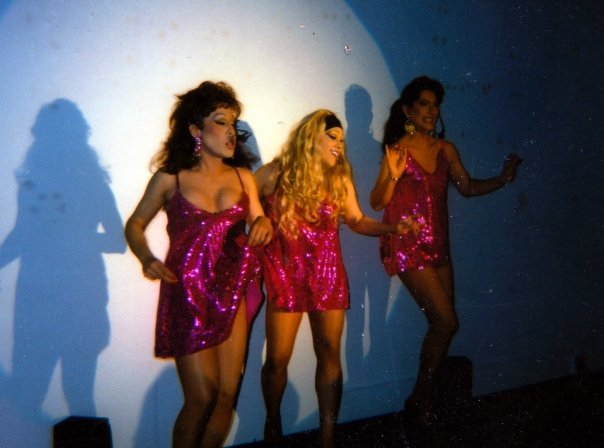
Adela and Las AtreDivas performing a show in 1994

Vázquez was centrally involved with Proyecto ContraSIDA Por Vida, an HIV prevention organization. Vázquez volunteered for Proyecto beginning in 1992 and later on became the first trans Latina employee, as their outreach coordinator. To combat the AIDS crisis, Vázquez and Proyecto organized around a multidimensional need to outreach. Vázquez's work was highlighted in Juana María Rodríguez book Queer Latinidad: Identity Practices, Discursive Spaces. In her chapter, "Activism and Identity," Rodríguez highlights the ways Proyecto offered a dynamic, culturally situated, queer approach to community health.

Vázquez's community work continued throughout the 1990s. Vázquez was on a committee of community advisory members for "The Transgender Community Health Project" for the University of San Francisco Department of Public Health.

Vázquez later on went to serve as a Latino AIDS Education and Prevention Program Coordinator at the Instituto Familiar de la Raza, Inc., a non-profit dedicated to improving the wellness of Latino people in San Francisco.

== Influence and impact ==
Diagnosing Difference (Film) - In 2009, Vázquez starred in a film titled Diagnosing Difference.The documentary film highlights the stories of thirteen transgender and genderqueer people and the impact of Gender Identity Disorder (G.I.D). In the film, Director Annalise Ophelian aims to humanize the conversation around gender variance by featuring people who don't identify with the gender they were born with, rather than psychologist and psychiatrists leading the conversation. In the film, Vázquez discusses the complexities of gender dysphoria along with the pressure of needing to pass.

I think 'passing' is a word to discriminate us immensely. Not everybody can pass. And passing is something that the doctors will tell you to do, you try to pass. Well, no matter how much I pass, I will never be a biological woman. How about empowering me as the transgender woman that I am?

— Adela Vazquez

Sexile/Sexilio, 2004 (Comic): - Sexile/Sexilio is a bilingual graphic novel by Jaime Cortez that illustrates the life of Vázquez. Cortez uses comics to illustrates various moments of Vázquez's life: her birth, Cuban school life, sexual explorations, Mariel Boat migration, and many others. Sexilio came out of collaboration with Gay Men's Health Crisis. Gay Men's Health Crisis has been an advocate and leading contributor to HIV/AIDS prevention. Sexilio was nominated as the National Association of Public Libraries' Queer Book of the Year.

¡Cuéntamelo!: Oral Histories by LGBT Latino Immigrants 2013, (Oral History) edited by Julián Delgado Lopera. Vázquez's oral history was recorded by Delgado Lopera, along with six other Latino immigrants in this bilingual collection. An image of Adela graces the cover.

Queer Brown Voices, 2015 (Book) - Queer Brown Voices: Personal Narratives of Latina/o LGBT Activism, edited by Letitia Gomez, Uriel Quesada, and Salvador Vidal-Ortiz is a collection of fourteen queer Latino Activist personal narratives and their impact on their communities. Vázquez is the only trans Latina voice in the book.

Puta Life: Seeing Latinas, Working Sex, 2023 (Book)--Adela's life is the subject of one chapter of the book Puta Life: Seeing Latinas, Working Sex, by Juana María Rodríguez. In it, Rodríguez compares the many different narrative accounts of Vázquez's life with the digital account she maintained on Facebook to argue about the limits of representation and to argue for the decriminalization of sex work.

Jose Sarria History Maker Award (2024). Adela was honored in 2024 by the Ken Jones Heritage of Pride Awards with the Jose Sarria History Maker Award by the San Francisco Pride.
