= Strange Fruit (disambiguation) =

"Strange Fruit" is a 1937 poem and song written by Abel Meeropol, made famous by Billie Holiday in 1939 and then covered by many other performers.

Strange Fruit may also refer to:

== Film ==
- Strange Fruit (film), a 2004 film by Kyle Schickner
- Strange Fruit, a fictional rock band in Still Crazy
- Strange Fruit, a 2020 short starring Edward W. Hardy

== Music ==
- Strange Fruit (Family Vibes album), 1972
- Strange Fruits, a 1999 album by Chara
- Strange Fruit (Trijntje Oosterhuis album), 2004
- Strange Fruit Project, an American hip hop group
- Strange Fruit Records, a former record label in the United Kingdom
- "Strange Fruit", a song by Catherine Wheel from Chrome
- "Strange Fruit", a song by Pete Rock from Soul Survivor
- "What's Really Going On (Strange Fruit)", a song by D'wayne Wiggins
- Strange Fruit, an American band featuring Steve Shelley and Steve Miller
- Strange Fruit, a string quartet piece by Edward W. Hardy, 2020

== Other uses ==
- Strange Fruit (novel), a 1944 novel by Lillian Smith that was adapted to a stage play in 1945 and a short film in 1979
- Strange Fruit (play), a 1945 adaptation of the novel
- Strange Fruit: A Dutch Queer Collective, a Dutch gay rights group active in the Netherlands from 1989 to 2002
- Strange Fruit, a slang term used in an LGBT context

== See also ==
- Strange Froots, a Canadian girl group, protégées of hip-hop supergroup Nomadic Massive
- Stranger Fruit, a post-black metal album by Zeal & Ardor
