= Horacio Roque Ramírez =

Salvadoran-American historian

- Born: November 15, 1969; Santa Ana, El Salvador
- Died: December 25, 2015 (aged 46); Los Angeles, California, United States

Academic background
- Education: UCLA (BA, MA); UC Berkeley (PhD)

Academic work
- Discipline: Historian
- Sub-discipline: Chicana/o studies, oral history, LGBT history
- Institutions: University of California, Santa Barbara

Horacio N. Roque Ramírez (November 15, 1969 – December 25, 2015) was a Salvadoran-American oral historian, writer and advocate whose work focused on LGBT Latino communities and the Central American experience in the United States. He was a faculty member in the Department of Chicana and Chicano Studies at the University of California, Santa Barbara.

== Early life ==
Roque Ramírez was born in Santa Ana, El Salvador. Fleeing the Salvadoran Civil War, he immigrated to Los Angeles at age 12, in 1981. He earned a B.A. in psychology and M.A. in history at the University of California, Los Angeles, and a Ph.D. in ethnic studies from the University of California, Berkeley. He came out as a gay man in 1992.

== Research ==
Roque Ramírez began his oral history work with San Francisco's queer Latina/o community, centered in the Mission District, as a doctoral student at UC Berkeley in the 1990s, working with activists and organizations including Diane Felix and Proyecto ContraSIDA por Vida, and documenting predecessor organizations such as the Gay Latino Alliance.

At the time of his death he was working on the book Queer Latino San Francisco: An Oral History, 1960s-1990s. He also served as an expert witness on political asylum and immigration.

== Publications ==
- Boyd, Nan Alamilla; Roque Ramírez, Horacio N., eds. (2012). Bodies of Evidence: The Practice of Queer Oral History. New York: Oxford University Press. ISBN 978-0-19-974273-8.
