= Boyd Vance =

American actor (1957–2005)

Boyd Vance (July 9, 1957 – April 9, 2005) was an American stage actor, director and producer in Austin, Texas. Vance was particularly known for supporting and advancing African-American performing arts in Austin. In 1993 he co-founded ProArts Collective, which he directed until his death following an unexpected heart surgery in 2005.

Boyd Vance was born in Houston on July 9, 1957. His spent his formative years in Houston's Third Ward where he was involved in many activities. Church, school, sports, and music were important parts of his life. He made his way to Austin to attend St. Stephen's Episcopal High School from which he graduated in May 1975.

After attending Rice University for one year, his love for Austin brought him back where he graduated from the University of Texas in 1983. He then began his professional career as an actor, producer, musician, and eventually began directing and administering arts organizations on behalf of numerous artistic interests, with a special passion for multicultural activities. Boyd's energy was indefatigable. He never met a stranger, nor left anyone without a smile resulting from the encounter. During his career as a professional actor, he appeared in dozens of productions, including "Cabaret", "You’re a Good Man Charlie Brown", "Bubbling Brown Sugar", "Ain’t Misbehavin", "Eubie", "Splendora" and Austin's longest running comedy "Shear Madness." He also appeared for several years with Austin's Comedy Troupe, Esther's Follies and Zachary Scott Theatre’s Project InterAct. Boyd directed over 40 main stage plays and musicals, including "Ain’t Misbehavin", "Purlie", "Blues for an Alabama Sky", "A Raisin in the Sun", "A My Name is Alice", "Joe Turner’s Come and Gone", "Love Song for Miss Lydia", "Big River", "The African Company presents Richard the Third", "Colored Museum" and many others.

His vocal range emulated that of the great vocal stylists. He was a featured performer in hundreds of performances over the years. Boyd had just recently returned from New York City, where he had been asked to be guest soloist at the funeral of Betsy Cronkite, the wife of journalist Walter Cronkite.

Boyd's collaborative work included Tapestry Dance Company, Ballet East, Aztlan Dance Company, Huston Tillotson University, Austin Community College, ‘Believe in Me’, Dance Umbrella, Ballet Austin, WH Passon Society, AISD, University of Texas at Austin. He likewise conceived and produced many community festivals, forums and cultural events. Some of these events include Soulful Christmas Bazaar, African American Festival of Dance, Tejano Low Rider Festival, United Artists for Peace Silent Auction and Art Fiesta and more.

In 1993, Boyd co-founded ProArts Collective and served as its artistic director since inception. In 1994, he went on brief hiatus to work with the National Task Force on AIDS Prevention as Treatment Advocacy Coordinator and then Coordinator of Direct Services. Upon returning to Austin, Boyd restructured ProArts Collective to become a Tax Exempt Non-Profit Multi-Disciplinary Arts Organization. He became a certified Non-Profit Manager. In 1998, ProArts embarked on new territory and began to encourage and sponsor various emerging artists.

In 2001, Boyd was able to form Austin's First African American Arts Technical Resource Center providing direct services, counseling, mentoring, and technical assistance to Artists of Color. At the present time, ProArts Collective and the African American Arts Technical Center sponsor and assist over 20 emerging art groups and artists of color. Boyd was also tapped as a peer panelist for the Texas Commission on the Arts Performing Arts Programs and served as consultant to Austin Independent School District's Children's arts programs.

In 2004, the Austin Critics Table inducted Vance into the Austin Arts Hall of Fame. Later that same year, the Austin Circle of Theaters awarded him with the B. Iden Payne Special Recognition Award for Outstanding Achievement in Austin theater. After his death, in 2005 the City of Austin renamed an existing theater at the George Washington Carver Museum and Cultural Center in Vance's honor "for his contribution to the Austin community."

Boyd's overall body of work was instrumental in the exhibition and development of emerging artists. His vision provided a multicultural appreciation of artists in every discipline. This was demonstrated not only his passion for his community, but his love for performance, music, literature and dance.

== Education ==
Vance entered St. Stephen's Episcopal School in Austin, Texas in 1973 and graduated there in 1975. He remained in Austin and earned his bachelor's degree in English from the University of Texas at Austin in 1983.

== Activism ==
In addition to his work with the National Task Force on AIDS Prevention, Vance was an activist and organizer among gay men of color. On the local level, for example, he participated and performed at the 1989 March on Austin for Lesbian and Gay Equal Rights. On the national level, Vance appeared at the Third National Gay Men of Color AIDS Institute in 1993, moderating a breakout session on "organizing gay men of color."
