= Redz Bar =

Lesbian Latina bar in Los Angeles, California (1953–2015)

Redz Bar Redhead Tavern Redheads Redz Angelz (2016–present)
- Interactive map of Redz Bar; Redhead Tavern; Redheads; Redz Angelz (2016–present)

Restaurant information
- Established: 1953
- Closed: 2015
- Location: 2218 East First Street; Boyle Heights, Los Angeles, California; United States
- Coordinates: 34.044336°N 118.211715°W

Redz Bar (1953 – 2015), now Redz Angelz (2016 – present) in Boyle Heights, Los Angeles, California, is a historic lesbian bar that catered to Latinas and Chicanas. It is formerly known as Redheads, and Redhead Tavern.

Redz Bar opened during a time of working-class lesbian bars and represented an important intersection of race, class, and sexuality.

A new bar was opened in 2016 under new ownership in the same former location with the name Redz Angelz. In 2018, performance artist Xandra Ibarra showed her film work at Redz Angelz.

== See also ==
- List of lesbian bars
- Esta Noche (gay bar), first Latino gay bar in San Francisco and notably contributed to queer Latin culture
