= Sexual health clinic =

Medical facility focused on sexually transmitted infections

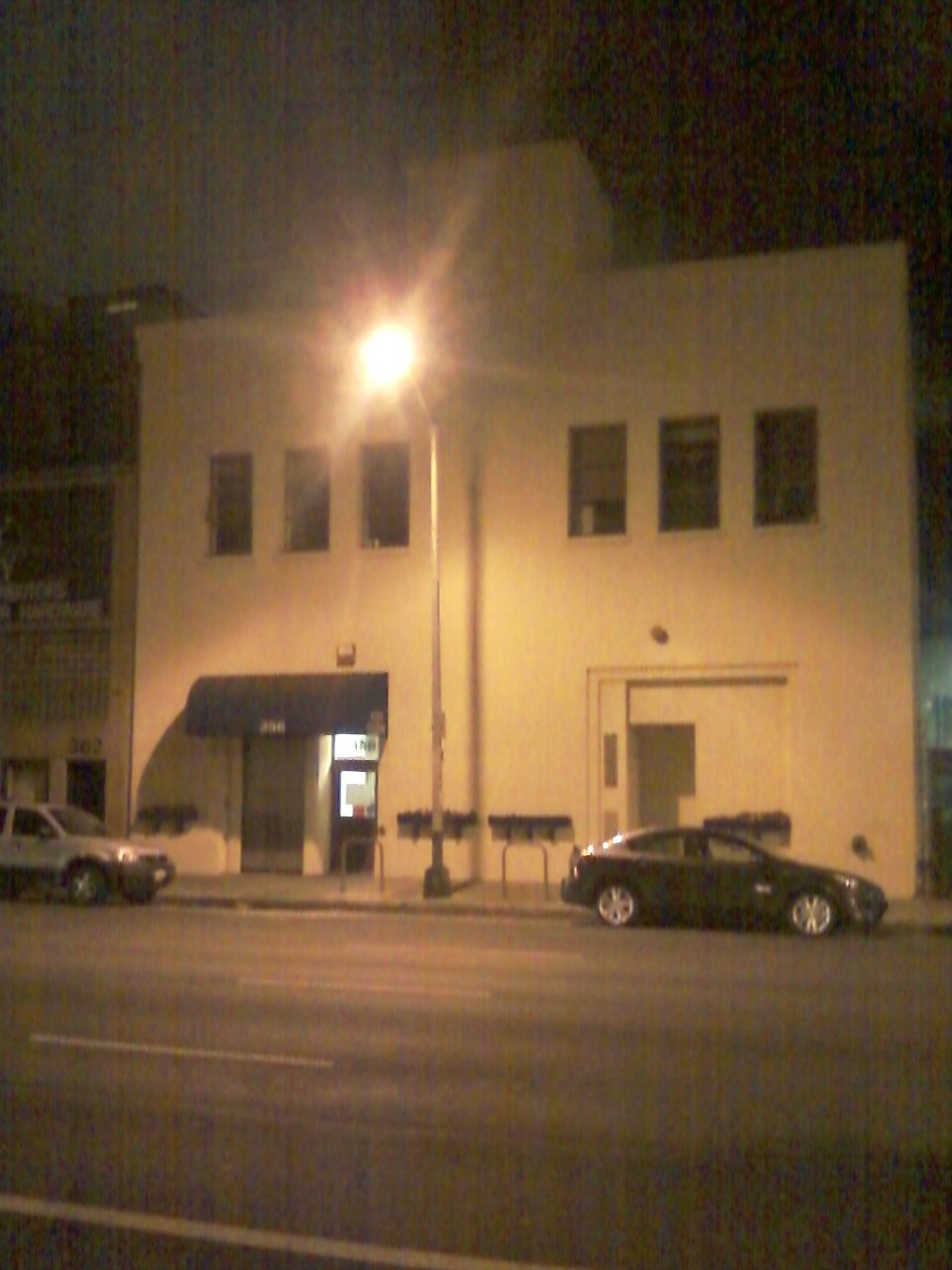
San Francisco City Clinic, an STI testing center in San Francisco

Sexual health clinics specialize in the prevention and treatment of sexually transmitted infections.

== Terminology ==
Sexual health clinics are also called sexually transmitted disease (STD) clinics, sexually transmitted infection (STI) clinics, venereal disease (VD) clinics, or genitourinary medicine (GUM) clinics.

Sexual health clinics differ from reproductive health and family planning clinics. Sexual health clinics offer only some reproductive health services. Reproductive health clinics, such as Planned Parenthood, offer most of the services of sexual health clinics.

== Services ==
Sexual health clinics provide some or all of the following:

- Information about safer sex, birth control, reproductive health and general sex education
- Free condoms
- Sexual health examinations
- Tests to detect some sexually transmitted infections
- Antibiotics to cure chlamydia, gonorrhea, and syphilis
- Medications and other treatments
- Vaccinations
- Counseling and therapy
- Emergency contraception
- Urine test for pregnancy
- Referrals for additional information or services

Many clinics provide vaccinations to prevent infections from the hepatitis A and B viruses. Young women may receive vaccinations to prevent infection from some strains of the human papillomavirus (HPV).

Many clinics provide interpreting for the hearing impaired or speakers of other languages.

Many clinics will help patients tell their sexual contacts if they have a sexually transmitted infection, anonymously if needed.

Public governmental and non-profit clinics often provide services for free or adjust the fee based on a patient's ability to pay. Sexual health clinics often offer services without appointments. Some clinics open on evenings or weekends. Some clinics have separate hours or facilities for men and women. Some clinics serve only specific populations such as women, men, MSM, youths, LGBT, ethnic groups, the poor, or students.

== Examinations ==
With the patient's consent, a clinician will inspect the patient visually and by touch. If needed, the clinician will take samples to test for sexually transmitted infections.

In a private room or space, the patient will partially undress.

The clinician may inspect the patient's:

- Throat and lymph nodes of the neck for inflammation
- Pubic hair for lice
- Lymph nodes of the groin for swelling
- Genitals, anus, and surrounding areas for sores and warts

The clinician may swab the patient's:

- Throat to test for gonorrhea and possibly chlamydia
- Cheek, inside, to diagnose HIV
- Sores of the genitals, anus, and surrounding areas to test for herpes
- Urethra to test for gonorrhea and possibly chlamydia
- Vagina to test for chlamydia and possibly gonorrhea
- Cervix to test for cervical intraepithelial neoplasia (a Pap test)
- Rectum to test for gonorrhea and possibly chlamydia

The clinician may take small blood samples by pricking a finger or from a vein to test for HIV, syphilis, and possibly herpes and hepatitis C.

The clinician may ask for a small urine sample, given in private, to test for chlamydia and possibly gonorrhea. The inspections and taking samples do not hurt, but swabbing the urethra and cervix, and a finger prick blood sample feel uncomfortable. Women will often receive a pelvic exam, both external and internal, but usually less thorough than a reproductive health exam. A patient can choose a female or male clinician if available. A patient can have a chaperone. Some clinics have separate hours or facilities for men and women.

== Privacy ==
Medical confidentiality is an important part of the medical ethics of a doctor–patient relationship. Sexual health clinics follow local standards of medical confidentiality to protect the privacy of patients. Some clinics provide anonymous services or protect confidentiality by having a patient use a number or a pseudonym.

Additional privacy protections sometimes apply to matters of sexuality and reproduction, since these areas are sensitive in many cultures. The diagnosis of HIV/AIDS has legal restrictions in patient confidentiality, and some clinics use rapid antibody tests to provide results to a patient within 30 minutes, without holding the patient's records.

In the United States, clinics receiving federal funding from Medicaid or Title X of the Public Health Service Act must treat all patients confidentially. Thus minors can receive services without parental notification or consent. Additionally, medical records for all patients age 18 and above are strictly confidential under HIPAA.

== Consent ==
Medical standards of informed consent apply to sexual health clinics. A patient needs information about the purposes and consequences of examinations, tests, treatments, and other procedures. A patient may then choose whether to consent to these procedures.

A minor may consent to receive some or all of the procedures at many sexual health clinics.
