= Dinorah de Jesús Rodriguez =

American film director

Dinorah de Jesús Rodríguez
- Born: April 28, 1957 (age 69); Placetas, Cuba
- Movement: Experimental film
- Website: solislandmediaworks.com

Dinorah de Jesús Rodríguez (born April 28, 1957) is an experimental film artist based between Miami, Florida, and La Habana, Cuba.

== Background ==
Rodríguez was born on April 28, 1957, in Placetas, Cuba, just prior to the Cuban Revolution. She emigrated with her family to the United States by way of Spain in 1963 at the age of six and grew up in an immigrant, working-class family in the United States. Rodriguez became interested in 16mm film making while studying journalism at Boston University from 1975 to 1978. From the beginning of her filmmaking career, she was drawn to experimental genres, inspired in the hand-crafted work of Len Lye, Stan Brakhage and Norman McLaren.

In 1978 Rodríguez moved to California and studied with the iconic lesbian-feminist experimental filmmaker Barbara Hammer who was teaching a workshop at the Los Angeles Woman's Building at the time. Rodríguez also studied with Warren Sonbert another experimental filmmaker, who was teaching at the San Francisco Art Institute and invited her to audit his class. Following 10 years of independent study, Rodríguez earned a B.A. in Film Production from San Francisco State University School of Creative Arts in 1988, studying under the guidance of such visionary experimentalists as Trinh T. Minh-ha and Marlon Riggs. Rodríguez's practice of manually altering 16mm film includes scratching into the emulsion to enhance or dialogue with the image already printed on the film. The artist also hand-colors and paints on film using inks and dyes.

Her use of appropriated materials turns up in her remakes of commercials and other moving image collage pieces. She is frequently recycles old celluloid footage into new works and experiments with damaged cameras and equipment, expired film stocks and found footage.

Among her earliest influences, and one that she attributes with having inspired the spiritual and aesthetic direction of her work, is Maya Deren an experimental filmmaker who worked in the United States during the 1940s and 50s. Another artist that Rodríguez claims as an inspiration is the "father of video art" Nam June Paik. Rodriguez's more contemporary influences include Isaac Julien, Pipilotti Rist, Lorna Simpson and Bill Viola.

== Film making ==
Rodríguez's hand-crafting techniques create very vivid and subliminal effects that speak to the human subconscious. Her work affects the subconscious mind by using the same visual tactics used in advertising and mass media. An open bisexual, she frequently engages sexually explicit themes in her work. Rodriguez is a rape survivor and feminist activist, practicing a form of public installations that she terms "Artivism," a practice she has been engaging in since the 1980s. Among the many awards and recognition she has received for her work, she won the 2009 FAN Knight New Work Award in the amount of $50,000 for her project Elusive Landscape that involved multiple hand-crafted 16mm film projections exhibited in outdoor locations across the city of Miami and projected directly into trees and foliage. Rodriguez's works have been exhibited internationally in film festivals, museums, galleries, TV, public outdoor installations and multimedia performances. Known for her many multidisciplinary collaborations, Rodriguez has worked on projects with a variety of international artists. Her public installations create a sense of community that brings many people together for public and communal view.

== Critical attention ==
Rodríguez's work has received critical attention from scholars interested in found footage and cinematic appropriation, Afrosurrealism, and Latino media arts. Her work has also received sustained critical attention by her sister, Juana María Rodríguez, a professor of Gender and Women's Studies at UC Berkeley who writes extensively about several of her films in the book Sexual Futures, Queer Gestures, and Other Latina Longings. Stills from Rodríguez's film, XXX, are featured on the cover.

== Selected works ==
=== Films ===
- A Trilogy: Ochún/Oricha – El Balance – Guerreros (1990, 28:00)
- Dolor y Perdón (1997, 03:16)
- (In Loving Memory...) for Soraya (1998, 05:07)
- L’anatomie du désir (2001, 05:25)
- Afterlife (2001, 04:14)
- Un nombre de mujer (2001, Film/Video, 06:25)
- Cortejo (2002, 04:27)
- female alchemy: a video symphony in seven movements (2004, 30:00)
- Dialogue in Space (2005, 01:32)
- Global Medea (2005, 03:48)
- you are the product of a sex tabú (2005, 02:13)
- Is It True Blondes Have More Fun? (2006, 0:59) A graffiti remake of a Clairol hair dye ad from the 1960s.
- Telepatía (2007, 06:17)
- XXX: Is sex safe?, Cyberputa, and How Come You Don’t Trust Me? (2007, 03:01)
- o Amor (2009, 12:00)
- IN A GADDA DA VIDA (In the Garden of Eden) (2010, 05:18)
- SONAMBULA (2011, 03:25)

=== Installations ===
- Image Party (2001)
- SET: A Set of Settings Unsettling Set Ways (2003)
- Everywhere, Marie (2005)
- XXX (2007)
- ephemera (2009)
- ellos y nosotros: them and us (2010)
- Elusive Landscape: Miami (2010)
- Ruins: Haunting Cafes Around the World (2011)
- Agua Florida: free-swimming fish (2012)
- mujer_cita_MIA (2013)

=== Multimedia ===
- .Epar (1997, Multimedia Performance, 1 hr.)
- The Anatomy of Desire (2000, Film/Performance, 1 Hr.)
- Image Party (2001, Interactive Installation/Performance)
- IPO (2004-2007, Multimedia Performance Series)
- Swallowing the Moon (2007, Multimedia Performance, 30 min.)
- Cabaret Unkempt (2006, Multimedia Performance, 1 Hr.)

== Achievements ==
=== Awards ===
- San Francisco Festival 2000, San Francisco, CA, Project Grant, (1990)
- Miami Light Project, Miami, FL, Here and Now Project Grant, (1998)
- Tigertail Productions, Miami, FL, Artists’ Access Grant, (2001, 2003, 2010)
- Miami-Dade County Cultural Affairs Consortium, FL, Artist's Enhancement Grant, (2004)
- Atlantic Center for the Arts, Residency Fellowship, (2005)
- Florida Division of Cultural Affairs, Individual Artists’ Fellowship, (2005, 2010)
- FAN/Knight New Work Award, Funding Arts Network, Miami, FL, Project Grant, (2009–2010)

=== Distinctions ===
- Resident, 16mm Film Production Intensive, Los Angeles Women's Building, (1978)
- Travel Fellowship Finalist, Fulbright Foundation, (1992)
- Media Arts Fellowship Nominee, Rockefeller Foundation National Video Resources, (1993)
- Media Arts Jury Panelist, South Carolina Arts Council, (1997)
- Juried Artist, Art Center South Florida, Miami, Beach, FL (1997–2001)
- Media Arts Jury Panelist, North Carolina Arts Council, (1998)
- Media Arts Jury Panelist, New Forms Miami, (1998)
- Media Arts Jury Panelist, Louisiana Division of the Arts, (1999 and 2000)
- Nominating Committee, National Video Resources/Rockefeller Foundation, (2000, 2001)
- Guest Curator, Hollywood Art and Culture Center, Hollywood, FL, (2005)
- Media Arts Jury Panelist, Mid-Atlantic Arts Foundation, Baltimore, MD (2007)
- Artist in Residence, Bass Museum of Art, Miami Beach, FL, (2001–2007)
- Adjudicator, YoungArts, Miami, FL (2008–present)
- Member, Board of Directors, Miami Beach Film Society and Cinematheque, (2009–present)

=== Prizes ===
- Big Muddy Film Festival, Honorable Mention for Afterlife (2002)
- Black Maria Film Festival, 2nd Place/Jury's Citation Award for Afterlife (2003)
