= James Credle =

- Born: February 7, 1945; Mesic, North Carolina, U.S.
- Died: April 15, 2023 (aged 78)
- Education: Rutgers University–Newark (BA)
- Occupations: Academic administrator and counselor, activist
- Known for: Veterans and LGBT rights activism
- Military career
- Allegiance: United States of America
- Branch: United States Army
- Service years: 1965–1967
- Rank: Specialist
- Unit: 196th Light Infantry Brigade
- Conflicts: Vietnam War
- Awards: Purple Heart; Bronze Star Medal with V Gallantry Cross; Army Commendation Medal

James Credle (February 7, 1945 – April 15, 2023) was an American academic administrator, counselor, and Veterans and LGBTQ rights activist. He was assistant dean of student affairs at Rutgers University–Newark and was a founding member of several Veterans and LGBTQ associations. For his actions in the Vietnam War, Credle received the Purple Heart, Bronze Star Medal with "V" device, Gallantry Cross, and an Army Commendation Medal.

== Early life ==
Credle was born on February 7, 1945, in Mesic, North Carolina during the time of Jim Crow laws. He was one of 14 children, seven boys and seven girls. As a child, he knew he was gay, but didn't know what gay meant, other than how the church described it, and he was picked on because he was thought of as a "sissie." His sister protected him from bullies, and his family was supportive of him being gay. He was a good student, and a good athlete in school. His mother was a dayworker and his father worked part-time as a carpenter; he looked up to his mother growing up, but James Baldwin was his first role model. Credle attended a segregated high school in 1962, and described it as "degrading of black people;"he also describes the feeling at the time that fighting against racism would lead to retaliation. Credle and his siblings worked through high school to supplement the family income. He worked in fields picking cotton, potatoes, corn, and cabbage. He later worked in a crab factory. His family were members of Mount Olive Baptist Church where he sang in the choir, but he struggled to accept the idea of a white god, and found the teachings of the church to be hypocritical. Credle graduated from the all-black Pamlico County Training School in 1962. He moved that year to Newark, New Jersey to work at the Veteran's Administration Hospital in Lyons with his aunt and uncle. However, he found that Newark was segregated by race and class, despite being a northern city. When asked about his experience of coming out, he said that it is a lifelong process, and that he doesn't try to hide his gay identity.

== Career and activism ==
Credle worked for three years at the Veterans' Administration Hospital in Lyons, New Jersey. In 1965, he was drafted into the army and served two years in the military. He underwent medic training at Fort Devens. From 1966 to 1967, he was in Vietnam serving as a Specialist 4 medic for the 196th Light Infantry Brigade. In Tây Ninh Province, Credle was wounded but continued to help other soldiers evacuate while under enemy fire.

He quickly returned to Newark shortly after the 1967 Newark riots. Within a month, Credle returned to work at the Lyons VA Hospital. He attended Rutgers University–Newark from 1968 to 1972 under the G.I. Bill and received a B.A. in sociology. Credle graduated third in his class. He started all four years on the Rutgers–Newark Scarlet Raiders basketball team and served as captain twice. Credle was a member of the Black Organization of Students (BOS) and Tau Kappa Epsilon. Along with other BOS members, Credle participated in a 72-hour occupation at Rutgers Conklin Hall protesting for increased opportunities and access for minority students, staff, and faculty at Rutgers–Newark.

He spent one semester at Rutgers Law School before obtaining the position of director of the office of veterans affairs at Rutgers–Newark. In 1976, Credle became assistant dean of student affairs at Rutgers. His responsibilities there included acting as the director of the office of veterans affairs. Credle worked at Rutgers for 37 years. During his time at Rutgers, he made efforts to create an inclusive environment for queer students.

Credle was also a founding member and chairperson for the New Jersey Association of Veterans Program Administrators and the minority affairs director for the National Association of Concerned Veterans. He was a founding member of the National Association for Black Veterans, vice chair of the New Jersey Agent Orange Commission, and the executive director of the National Council of Churches' Veterans in Prisons program. Credle was a founding member and previous co-chair of the National Association of Black and White Men Together, which was created in San Francisco in 1980, and the New York Men of All Colors Together. These associations are dedicated to fighting racism and sexism. The 35th year of the association, in 2015, an event was held in Newark. His association does "conscious raising" events and produced a newsletter in New York. Many famous queer activists and celebrities, including James Baldwin, have been involved in the association. During the AIDS crisis, his groups did a workshop in Newark in 1990, and he moved back to Newark from New York. He wrote a grant to the CDC for educational resources on AIDs. This was called Project Fire, and ran from 1992 to 2002, when the federal government stopped funding them. The group also hosted balls for the queer community, which led to judgement from media and the government. Credle believed that struggle for gay marriage is less important than the fight for survival of queer youth and the fight against AIDS. Fighting against apartheid in South Africa was also important to him.

Credle was a co-founder and board member of Newark Pride Alliance and a member of the Newark Commission on LGBT Concerns.

== Personal life ==
Growing up, Credle was close to his mother, but not with his father. Before his father's death, they reconciled. Although Credle knew he was gay in 1965, he did not tell the United States Army. Credle believed serving in the war was the right thing to do and did not want to disqualify himself. While in the army for two years as a combat medic, he bought a house for his parents. In 1967, he had his first sexual relationship with a man during, R&R in Tokyo, and they had a very close relationship. Credle ended the relationship when it was clear that the man was married to a woman. In 1968, Credle began an 11-year relationship with a fellow Rutgers–Newark student and basketball player. At one point in the 1970s, after leaving a nightclub and having an altercation, someone shot a bullet at Credle's car while he and his partner were driving away. While living in Newark, Credle describes that there were not many gay bars and clubs, other than Murphy's, and that New York was the best place to go for the gay community. He has been in three long-term relationships in his life, and didn't do much dating. During the AIDS crisis in 1982, he was part of medical study that focused on gay men in New York. The study helped him stay HIV negative, as it provided information on safe sex. Having survived the Vietnam war and the AIDS crisis, Credle felt great sadness for the lives that were lost. He expressed frustration and sadness that the government refused to help victims of AIDS. Politically, he found politics troubling, such as problems with gun laws, and thought that politicians were more focused on winning elections than doing the right thing. However, he stated that conditions for queer people improved during Obama's presidency. Credle said that the white gay community is more focused on gay rights than human rights, reflecting racial divides in the movement for queer equality.

On the morning of October 21, 2013, the first day New Jersey allowed same-sex marriage, Credle married Pierre Dufresne. He had previously been married in Amsterdam in 1990. He also had an unofficial wedding in which he and his husband "jumped the broom." His wedding in 2013 was officiated by Cory Booker at Newark City Hall. Credle has experienced posttraumatic stress disorder from his military service, and was not offered treatment from the army, which inspired him to work with veterans later in life. He was later pleased that gays and lesbians can openly serve in the military. He stated that he thinks the "don't ask don't tell" policy was "stupid." In a 2015 he was interviewed by the Queer Newark Oral History Project.Credle believed that while there had been progress for LGBTQ rights, there was more work to be done, and he believed that the white gay community and the black gay community need to come together more. He liked music and dancing, stating that he liked the artist Adele, and his favorite song is "Rolling in the Deep." He also enjoyed cooking and occasionally catered events; he was also a sports fan, and enjoyed the show Scandal. Growing up, Credle was an Elvis fan and listened to Bee-Bop and Motown. Credle was not religious as an adult, but believed that there is a higher being and describes himself as Baptist oriented. He found that religion was overly structured by white supremacy and patriarchy.

== Awards and honors ==
For his heroic actions in the Vietnam War, Credle received the Purple Heart, Bronze Star Medal with "V" device, Gallantry Cross, and an Army Commendation Medal.
