= San Francisco City Clinic =

Coordinates: 37°46′33.55″N 122°24′25.4″W

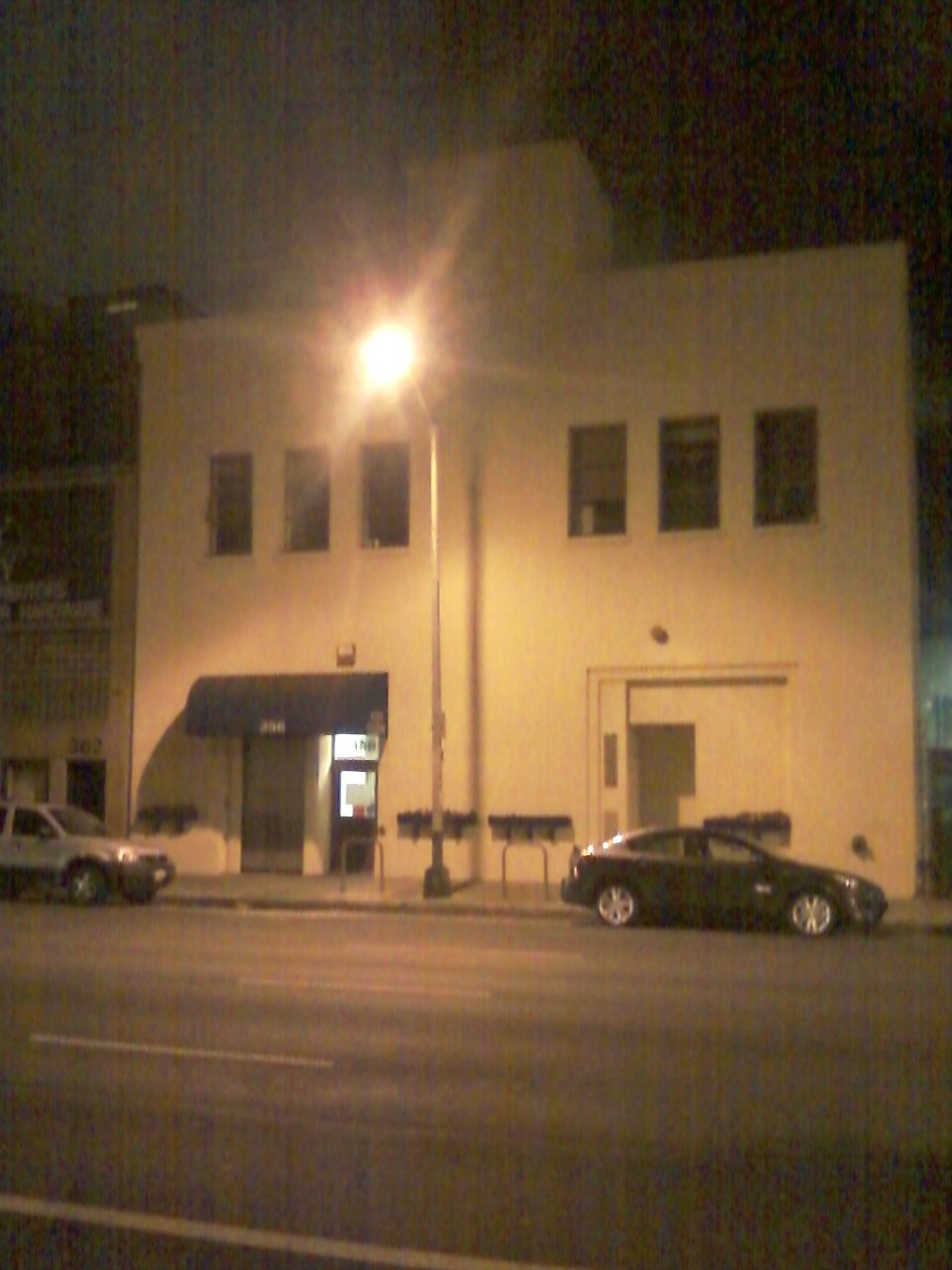
- SF City Clinic at night.

Geography
- Location: San Francisco, San Francisco, California, United States

Organization
- Care system: STI testing, treatment, counseling, research, prevention, education, outreach

History
- Founded: 1933

Links
- Website: SFCityClinic.org
- Lists: Hospitals in California

San Francisco City Clinic also known as SF City Clinic or usually as City Clinic is a municipal public sexual health clinic specializing in sexually transmitted infections testing and treatment, in addition to advocacy work and medical research. The center is located in the South of Market or "SoMa" district on the north-east side of San Francisco, California, along San Francisco Bay.

== Overview ==
=== History ===
San Francisco City Clinic is run by the City and County of San Francisco's Department of Public Health. The health center opened and began serving the sexually active members of San Francisco's communities in 1933. Its precursor was the Municipal Clinic of San Francisco opened in 1911 to treat prostitutes suffering from the "Red Plague". The clinic is located on 7th Street, at number 356, its current location where it has operated continuously since the health center's inception. The center has been researching the human immunodeficiency virus since the 1970s. City Clinic has done extensive HIV research and how it affects the gay community in San Francisco including tracking the epidemic by zip codes and neighborhoods and mapping the severity of infections. In the 2000s Craigslist added a link the clinic's website as a disclaimer on the page preceding the men seeking men section of the page. Since its opening the most common diseases treated were gonorrhea, syphilis, and chlamydia, and they continue to be so. Most of the clientele are teenagers, people in their 20s, and gays and lesbians.

=== Operations ===
The clinic offers low cost sexually transmitted disease testing and treatment in addition to birth control to anyone over the age of 12. It runs out of an old firehouse on 7th Street. The services are provided in English, Spanish, Mandarin and Cantonese Chinese, Tagalog, and Russian. Although there is a nominal US$25 flat rate charge no one is refused for lack of funds nor are they invoiced later. The health center also offers free counseling on genital, reproductive, STD, and prevention issues along with free condoms and lubricant. On average, the clinic sees over 100 patients daily. Many patients are San Francisco residents, but the clinic also serves patients from outside the city. The clinic also does outreach efforts with sex workers. City Clinic offers Emergency Post-Exposure Prophylaxis treatments for those that have recently come into contact with HIV. Rape reception services are also available.

=== Research ===
The center coordinates with various medical research studies particularly those regarding HIV and gay, bisexual, and men who have sex with men communities. Starting in the year 2002 and continuing into 2003, the clinic as part of a national study helped to discover a large increase in gonorrhea and syphilis cases amongst gay and bisexual men that was attributed to the perception that HIV treatments had greatly improved making the condition less life-threatening. San Francisco City Clinic also does extensive outreach in the predominantly African-American Bayview-Hunters Point district because of the large incidence of new HIV cases in that community. The clinic followed various cohorts from the late 1970s to the late 1980s and participated in research to determine the causalities of HIV/AIDS in addition to maintain empirical data of the men studied.

== Accessibility ==
The clinic is open Monday through Friday with varying hours of operation and services offered, no appointment is necessary nor available as this is a drop in clinic. Hours are eight in the morning until four in the afternoon Monday, Wednesday, and Friday and opening at one in the afternoon Tuesdays and Thursdays closing at six on the former and four on the latter. Patrons may park at metered parking along 7th street and surrounding roads. The area can be accessed by major arterials VanNess, Market, and Third Street in addition to Highway 101 and Interstate 80. Visitors may also use public transportation to get to San Francisco City Clinic with nearly a dozen bus lines within a few blocks provided by the San Francisco Municipal Railway or by light rail and BART from the nearby Civic Center/United Nations Plaza station. Those from outside the city may access the clinic from nearby Golden Gate Transit, AC Transit and SamTrans service.

== See also ==
- Hank M. Tavera
