= Reggie Williams (activist) =

American activist (1951–1999)

Reggie Williams (April 29, 1951 – February 7, 1999) was an American AIDS activist, who fought for culturally relevant AIDS education and services for gay and bisexual men of color. Williams served as a board member for the National Association of Black and White Men Together and as the first executive director of the National Task Force on AIDS Prevention.

== Early life ==
Reggie Williams was born on April 29, 1951, in Cincinnati, Ohio. He graduated from Withrow High School in 1969.

== Career ==
Williams became an X-ray technician and in the early 1970s moved to Los Angeles, where he worked at Cedars Sinai Hospital. In 1981 he moved to San Francisco with Tim Isbell, his boyfriend at the time, and began working as an X-ray technician at the University of California Medical Center.

In 1984, Williams began organizing in San Francisco to address the AIDS epidemic among Black gay men and other gay men of color, at around the same time that similar efforts were getting underway in Los Angeles and Philadelphia. Williams was concerned that existing AIDS education efforts, which were organized largely by white gay men, were not reaching gay men of color. This work led him to help found the National Task Force on AIDS Prevention (NTFAP), and to serve as the group's first executive director, from 1988 to 1994.

== AIDS Activism ==
I share with them that they don’t have to get this disease. I got it because I didn’t know. I didn’t get it because I am gay. I didn’t get it because I am Black. I got it because I didn’t have the information.

— Reggie Williams (1989), on speaking to high school students about AIDS

The same year that Williams and Isbell moved to San Francisco, the first cases of what would later be recognized as AIDS were showing up in gay men living in large cities. In San Francisco, activism surrounding the new disease centered on the San Francisco AIDS Foundation (SFAF), founded in 1982. However, SFAF was rooted in a gay community that was mostly white, and from which many non-white gay and bisexual men felt excluded. As a result, the group had trouble reaching non-white gay and bisexual men, who were disproportionately affected by AIDS. Williams would work to fill this gap in services, making AIDS outreach and education for gay and bisexual men of color the focus of much of the rest of his life.

After moving to San Francisco, Williams and Isbell became involved in Black and White Men Together/San Francisco (BWMT/SF), the local chapter of the National Association of Black and White Men Together (NABWMT). BWMT chapters were mainly social groups for gay men interested in interracial dating, but some also organized against the kind of mistreatment, such as discriminatory carding policies at gay bars, that made gay men of color feel excluded from gay neighborhoods such as San Francisco's Castro District.

While working at University of California Medical Center, Williams saw that more and more people—including many gay men—in San Francisco were becoming sick with AIDS. He also saw that early attempts to educate the community about the new disease were failing to connect with gay and bisexual men of color, and especially with Black gay and bisexual men. In 1984 Williams helped to found an AIDS Task Force within BWMT/SF to address these racial inequities in AIDS treatment and services in San Francisco. As co-chair of the BWMT/SF AIDS Task Force, he met with representatives from the Shanti Project, a local center providing support services to people with AIDS, to address allegations of racial discrimination by staff members. He also advised SFAF and the San Francisco Department of Public Health on how to improve HIV education efforts aimed at minority communities.

In 1986, Williams tested positive for HIV. He became involved with the Wedge Project, which focused on AIDS education in San Francisco high schools. As part of this work, he spoke to tenth-grade students about his experience of testing positive for, and living with, HIV. At the same time, he became increasingly involved with a growing number of local organizations that addressed AIDS in San Francisco's minority communities, including Kapuna West Inner-City Child/Family AIDS Network (KWIC-FAN) and the Third World AIDS Advisory Task Force.

=== National Task Force on AIDS Prevention (NTFAP) ===
In 1988 Williams, along with other board members of NABWMT, submitted a proposal to the Centers for Disease Control's (CDC) National AIDS Information and Education Program. They requested $200,000 over five years to start the National Task Force on AIDS Prevention as a projection of NABWMT. They saw this as an opportunity to build on the work that local BWMT chapters had been doing to educate their members about HIV and AIDS, much in the same way that Williams had started an AIDS Task Force within the San Francisco chapter.

Williams became the group's first executive director, and established the group's first office, in the Urban Life Center in the Fillmore District of San Francisco. As executive director, he led the group's efforts to teach Black gay and bisexual men how to protect themselves from HIV through safe sex; to conduct a national survey of Black gay and bisexual men's knowledge, attitudes, and behavior regarding safe sex and HIV/AIDS; and to organize events such as the Gay Men of Color AIDS Institute, an annual conference of non-white gay men working in AIDS education, services, and advocacy.

Williams was also instrumental in establishing the San Francisco Gay Men of Color Consortium (GMOCC). In 1989, as executive director of NTFAP, Williams submitted a funding request to Northern California Grantmakers to support a new project that would address AIDS education for gay and bisexual men in San Francisco's different communities of color. Along with NTFAP, founding organizations in GMOCC included Bay Area HIV Support and Education Services, Community United in Response to AIDS/SIDA (CURAS), Gay Asian Pacific Alliance Community HIV Project (G-CHP), and the American Indian AIDS Institute (AIAI). In addition to Williams, early leaders in GMOCC included Rodrigo Reyes of CURAS, Douglas Yaranon and Steve Lew of G-CHP, and Phill Tingley of AIAI. Leaders and staff at GMOCC member groups worked together to develop culturally relevant AIDS education and services for their respective communities.

In 1991, NTFAP suffered a dramatic reduction in CDC funding due to conservative backlash over its use of public funds to conduct sexually explicit AIDS education workshops. As a result, the group launched the Campaign for Fairness to demand more funding for AIDS education and services aimed at gay and bisexual men of color. Williams himself testified before a congressional subcommittee in July 1992, where he argued that gay and bisexual men of color should have a greater role in shaping AIDS policy. The following year, in 1993, the CDC mandated that local, state, and territorial health departments involve members of communities affected by HIV/AIDS in deciding how federal AIDS funding should be used, opening the door for the kind of change that Williams had demanded.

Williams resigned as executive director of NTFAP in early 1994. He was succeeded in this role by Randy Miller. NTFAP ceased operations in 1998.

== Later life ==
After leaving NTFAP, Williams moved to the Netherlands to be with his new partner, Wolfgang Schreiber, and to escape the discrimination that he continued to face as a man living with HIV in the United States. Schreiber was prohibited from moving to the United States at the time because of his HIV-positive status. The two lived in Amsterdam, where Williams became involved with Strange Fruit, a group for queer people of color.

Williams suffered a bout of Pneumocystis pneumonia in 1995, and was diagnosed with colon cancer in 1996. In spite of his declining health, Williams was able to travel periodically, and returned to California in 1997 and 1998. He died from AIDS complications on February 7, 1999, at age 47.
