= Miles R. Everitt =

American photographer (1912–1994)

- Born: 1912; Oregon, U.S.
- Died: April 1994 (aged 81–82)
- Occupations: Photographer; electrical engineer
- Years active: 1930s–1980s (archive dates 1932–1987)
- Known for: Photographs of African-American nude male models

Miles R. Everitt (1912 – April 1994) was an American photographer based in Los Angeles whose photography primarily depicted nude African-American male models. Everitt did not publicly exhibit his work during his lifetime, reportedly due to concern that it could jeopardize his employment as an electrical engineer and subject his work to censorship or confiscation. His work is discussed in published sources on photographer Robert Mapplethorpe’s late-1970s study of earlier and contemporary photographers of Black male nudes. Everitt’s photographic archive is held by the ONE National Gay & Lesbian Archives at USC Libraries.

== Life and career ==
Everitt was born in 1912 in Oregon. The collection finding aid reports that his family relocated to Los Angeles between 1920 and 1930. The same source notes that, according to 1940 United States census records, he lived with his parents at 5735 Alviso Avenue in Los Angeles; his occupation was recorded as "telephone equipment installation" and he had completed his third year of college. The finding aid further states that he was selected for service as a warrant officer in 1941 and appears to have served in the Army Airways Communication Service (AACS) during World War II.

After the war, Everitt worked as an electrical engineer, including for the City of Los Angeles and later in the aerospace industry. In a 1994 profile published by the Stereo Club of Southern California, Mitch Walker described Everitt as helping create communications equipment for NASA and as maintaining a long-running private photographic practice. Walker also wrote that Everitt was a contemporary of Ansel Adams and Imogen Cunningham and personally knew members of the original Group f/64 in the 1930s.

== Photography ==
Everitt’s surviving photographic materials date from 1932 to 1987, with the bulk dating from the early 1960s to the late 1980s. In addition to nude studies, the archive includes travel and vacation photographs, as well as test photographs related to equipment, exposure, and lighting. The finding aid notes that Everitt used multiple film formats including 35mm, 127, 120, and large-format 4×5 negatives, and experimented with outdoor shooting, varied backgrounds, and stop-motion photography.

The finding aid states that Everitt learned to develop his own film and slides to avoid censorship and confiscation by commercial film developers. Walker similarly reported that Everitt processed his own color materials in response to lab censorship practices.

Everitt has been credited with developing the technique of photographing African-Americans against a black background; the finding aid describes this claim as unsubstantiated.

Finding aids for ONE Archives collections describe Everitt as a member of the National Association of Black and White Men Together and note that he photographed parties and gatherings in and around Los Angeles during the 1980s; some of these photographs are preserved in the ONE Archives collections.

== Archives and collection ==
Everitt’s photographic materials are preserved as Miles Everitt Photographs (Coll2013-100) at the ONE National Gay & Lesbian Archives, USC Libraries, University of Southern California. The collection comprises photographic prints, negatives, and slides and measures 66.8 linear feet (13 archive boxes, 2 archive cartons, 20 archive binders, 9 archive shoe boxes, and 38 archive flat boxes). A deed of gift is dated December 21, 1992, and the collection was processed in part prior to 2006 and again in January 2013.

USC Libraries noted that photographs by Everitt have been featured in cultural programs and exhibitions at the ONE Archives. In 2012, Everitt’s photographs were included in Latent Images, an exhibition presented by the ONE National Gay & Lesbian Archives; the exhibition text described him as an amateur photographer who “obsessively photographed African American men beginning in the 1930s” and who referred to himself as “content to be unknown.”

== Relationship with Robert Mapplethorpe ==
Morrisroe writes that during Mapplethorpe’s efforts to study photographs of Black male nudes in the late 1970s, he was introduced (via Kelly Edey) to Everitt, described as a retired electrical engineer in Los Angeles who had been photographing Black men since the early 1930s and who kept his photographs private out of fear of losing his job. According to Morrisroe, Mapplethorpe flew to Los Angeles to meet Everitt and purchased twenty prints, and at Everitt’s suggestion later began photographing Black models against black backdrop paper rather than gray to emphasize highlights in the skin.

The collection finding aid for Everitt’s archive also states that a small number of buyers, photographers, and publishers knew of Everitt’s work, including Mapplethorpe, and that Everitt met Mapplethorpe when Mapplethorpe visited Los Angeles in the late 1970s or early 1980s.

In Robert Mapplethorpe: The Archive, Frances Terpak discusses Everitt as an “underground” Los Angeles photographer and describes Everitt’s imagery as introducing Mapplethorpe to more experimental ways of framing nude male figures. Terpak writes that Everitt belonged to the national club Black and White Men Together and had been clandestinely photographing Black men since 1931, and states that Mapplethorpe purchased twenty photographs from Everitt. Terpak describes Everitt’s photographs as including unexpected erotic poses and motifs—such as a series on urination and close-ups of penises, sometimes adorned with watches and necklaces—and states that Everitt’s tight cropping and pairing of accessories with the nude Black body influenced Mapplethorpe’s later compositions and commercial work.

Terpak also notes that Mapplethorpe’s arrangement of Kazuyuki Kumagai belts around a model’s torso and arms resembled Japanese rope bondage or Everitt’s private photographs depicting the phalli of African-American men adorned with watches and bracelets. The book includes a photograph of Everitt and reproduces a photograph credited to him in its discussion of Mapplethorpe’s sources and influences.

ONE Archives at USC Libraries has described Everitt’s photographs of African-American men as influential on Mapplethorpe.

Writer Jack Fritscher described Mapplethorpe as "very absorbent" and wrote that he sought out photographers including Everitt while developing his work.

== Name variation ==
Everitt’s surname is sometimes rendered as "Everett" in some sources, including the title of Walker’s 1994 profile and writings by Jack Fritscher.
