= Hank M. Tavera =

American AIDS activist (1944–2000)

Henry M. Tavera
- Born: January 19, 1944
- Died: February 27, 2000 (aged 56)
- Citizenship: United States
- Occupations: Activist, cultural worker, archivist, AIDS intervention specialist
- Known for: AIDS activism

Henry M. Tavera (January 19, 1944, East Los Angeles, California – February 27, 2000) was an AIDS activist, artistic director, and archivist based in the Mission District of San Francisco, California; his 1979 move to the region put him at the forefront of the AIDS epidemic via his involvement in various HIV/AIDS service organizations as well as AIDS theatre. He also did work around Chicano Gay Activism and teaching/advising. Tavera died on February 27, 2000, at 56 years old from kidney cancer.

== Career ==
In a lifetime dedicated to advocacy and activism, Hank Tavera was heavily involved in work surrounding the AIDS epidemic. Tavera worked at the San Francisco City Clinic where he held the position of HIV/AIDS intervention specialist. Between 1986 and 1990, Tavera joined the staff of the San Francisco AIDS Foundation, where he was responsible for running the Client Services department. During his time there, Tavera established bilingual services that centered on women and multiculturalism. In the following years, Tavera played crucial roles as an advocate by participating in the Latino Coalition on AIDS, chairing in the Third World AIDS Advisory Task Force, and becoming a voting delegate for LIFE, a Sacramento LGBT and AIDS lobby.

He later co-founded LLEGO (Latina/o Lesbian and Gay Organization) in California as well as National LLEGO, which were both organizations dedicated to the overall empowerment of all who were a part of the greater LGBT community. Hank Tavera and LLEGO were present during the 1993 Washington March for Lesbian, Gay, and Bi Equal Rights and Liberation.

Tavera continued his activism in the theatrical world, in which he engaged with Mexican American theater and worked in creating the newsletter for TENAZ Talks Teatro, a publication in La Revista Literaria de El Tecolote, a San Francisco publication that showcased Latina/Chicana women in theater. In addition to this, Tavera was a well-known director of plays, directing nine consecutive years of the Performing Arts Shows of Latina/o Gay, Lesbian, Bisexual, and Transgender Artists at the Mission Cultural Center for Latino Arts.

Tavera also worked in education when he served as a high school teacher at St. John Bosco Highschool as well as a college teacher at Santa Barbara City College. His work in education continued when he worked as an advisor at University of California, Santa Barbara.

== Personal life ==
Hank Tavera was heavily influenced by the United Farm Workers grape boycott and the Chicano theater movement, both of which were foundational in his political and artistic values.

In regards to Hank Tavera's personal relationships, he was in a domestic partnership for 20 years with Quehal Weso, who he shared a home with. He also had a boyfriend whose name was James Sales and had been dating for a total of 9 years in 1996.

His two children are son Mario Tavera and daughter Cecilia Tavera.

Tavera also identified as a gay Catholic, and was therefore part of the San Francisco chapter for Dignity/San Francisco, an LGBT Catholic organization dedicated to the "wholeness and holiness of Lesbian, Gay, Bisexual and Transgender catholics".

== AIDS activism ==
=== San Francisco AIDS Foundation (SFAF) ===
In 1985, Hank Tavera was hired as a staff member in the San Francisco AIDS Foundation's Client Services department. This was a result of a meeting that took place in May of the same year where SFAF's board members expressed their concerns about a lack of staff members who were committed to accomplishing the organization's goal of outreaching to communities of color.

=== Third World AIDS Advisory Task Force (TWAATF) ===
Along with running Client Services at SFAF, Tavera was a member of the Latino Coalition on AIDS and chaired the Third World AIDS Advisory Task Force. TWAATF was founded in 1985 in an effort to address the distinct ways men of color accessed AIDS prevention and treatment resources. This included an understanding of "the historical reality of racial discrimination in gay institutions," venues that AIDS service organizations like SFAF mainly targeted. Their mission was to "[assist] existing AIDS organizations with providing educational material that is relevant, culturally sensitive, and can be understood by our communities".

=== San Francisco City Clinic ===
Tavera worked at the San Francisco City Clinic as an HIV/AIDS interventions specialist.

=== "Just Say No to Mandatory Testing of Prostitutes" San Francisco 1988 Campaign ===
Hank Tavera participated in the campaign against the passing of Assembly Bill 2319 in 1988, which ultimately aimed at the mandatory testing of prostitutes, prisoners or new born babies for HIV/AIDS.

== AIDS theater ==
=== Teatro Gusto (San Francisco) ===
In the spring of 1983, Tavera directed The Leash and a two-act version of Reunion with San Francisco's Teatro Gusto. Reunion is Filipino-American Edgar Poma’s play about a young Chicano’s coming out story.

=== National AIDS Theater Festivals ===
In 1989, Tavera became the artistic director of the National AIDS Theater Festivals.

=== Performing Arts Show of Latino/a Gay, Lesbian, Bisexual, and Transgender Artists ===
In 1991, he became the director of the Performing Arts Show of Latino/a Gay, Lesbian, Bisexual, and Transgender Artists. In 1992, Tavera produced Gustavo Martín Cravioto's Soy Tu Madre and premiered it at the Mission Cultural Center. Soy Tu Madre was a melodrama that brought attention to the inaccessibility of HIV and safe sex resources to both homosexual and heterosexual Latinos. The play follows the story of a married heterosexual couple, who die after being infected with HIV, and the husband's mother, who wonders about an alternative ending had they been informed about HIV prevention and treatment.

=== AIDS Theater Festival of San Francisco ===
In 1993, Tavera became the director of the AIDS Theater Festival of San Francisco. This festival took place every year, alongside the National AIDS Update Conference, with the purpose of spotlighting talented Latinos/as.

== Awards and honors ==
- In 1989, Tavera received the "Excellent Leadership Award" from the Third World Counselors Association of California.
- In 1994, Tavera received the "Bay Area Angel Honoree" award from the American Conservatory Theater, a theatre company located in San Francisco, California.
- In 1996, Tavera was given the "Outstanding Community Service Achievement Award" from AGUILAS, an organization in San Francisco, for his continued activism in the LGBT community and activist/theatre work centering the AIDS epidemic.
- In 1997, Tavera was the first to be awarded the "Premio Cultura Award" from the National LLEGO (Latina/o Lesbian and Gay Organization) in Puerto Rico at their Quinto Encuentro event.
- In 1999, Tavera received the "Pax Bonum Award" from Dignity/San Francisco, an LGBT Catholics organization.

== Featured work and publications ==
- Tavera's poem "What Is AIDS Theater?" was used in Sandoval-Sanchez's book José, Can You See?: Latinos on and off Broadway as an exemplary definition of AIDS Theater. Sandoval-Sanchez states that AIDS Theater is "an act of mourning… solidarity… survival and creativity for those living with and affected by AIDS."
- Tavera co-authored the Multicultural Plan for Dignity/San Francisco.
- Tavera's archive, the "Hank M. Tavera Papers," is one of the very few archives on "lesbian and gay" people of color that have been fully cataloged .

== See also ==
- HIV/AIDS in the United States
- Prevention of HIV/AIDS
- LGBT culture in San Francisco
- Art of the AIDS Crisis
- Diane Felix
- Taverna (Hank) Papers, Online Archive of California
