= National Task Force on AIDS Prevention =

The National Task Force on AIDS Prevention (NTFAP) was established in 1985 as a national minority organization committed to ending the HIV epidemic by advocating for and supporting the development of HIV education and service programs created by and for gay and bisexual men of color." The NTFAP was established to support gay men of color who felt excluded from mainstream HIV/AIDS programs and education campaigns, which primarily focused on white gay men. Its significance grew during the 1980s, as infection rates in communities of color rose sharply compared to those in white communities. The task force aimed to ensure that local gay men of color were effectively reached by HIV/AIDS prevention services. The NTFAP aimed to create culturally relevant propaganda that would help slow the rate of infection in communities of color. While the work done by the NTFAP stayed in the local San Francisco area, the intent of the organization was to set an example for the nation to follow in creating preventive services that crossed ethnic and cultural lines.

== History ==
"If they're not going to do it [prevention for gay men of color], then goddamn it, we can do it ourselves. We're not crippled! We have power. That's why we created the National Task Force on AIDS Prevention – to do it for ourselves." -Reggie Williams

The National Task Force on AIDS Prevention started as a project of the National Association of Black and White Men Together (NABWMT). In 1988, a group of NABWMT board members—including Reggie Williams, James Credle, Steve Feeback, Tom Horan, and John Teamer—submitted a proposal to the National AIDS Information and Education Program of the Centers for Disease Control and Prevention. They were awarded $200,000 to launch the NTFAP, which, among other initiative, was tasked with coordinating the AIDS education efforts of local NABWMT chapters across the country. Reggie Williams served as the Executive Director of NTFAP from its birth until his retirement in February 1994. Randy Miller succeeded Williams, and was later replaced as head of the organization by Mario Solis-Marich, who served as CEO. In 1996, Angel Fabian co-organized the National Task Force on AIDS Prevention's first Gay/Bisexual Young Men of Color Summit at Gay Men of Color Conference, Miami, Florida. It closed in June 1998.
