= Tamara Ching =

American transgender rights activist

Tamara Ching is an American trans woman and San Francisco Bay Area transgender activist. Also known as the "God Mother of Polk [Street]", she is an advocate for trans, HIV, and sex work-related causes.

== Early life and education ==
Ching was born in 1949 and grew up in the Tenderloin district in San Francisco, California. She is multi-racial and has German, Hawaiian, and Chinese ancestry. Throughout her teen years, she became a sex worker as a way of survival. Ching was empowered to address the contemporary issues related to her experience as a sex worker. Suffering with diabetes and hepatitis C, she continues to do work within the transgender and sex worker community since the 1960s and strives to create a space for young trans people.

== Activism ==
- Transgender and commercial sex work advocacy.
- Endorsed Proposition K during the November 2008 San Francisco general election, which did not pass.

== Honors and awards ==
- Honored in a Clarion Alley mural portraying trans women activists in the Mission District of San Francisco, California. Created in 2012 by Tanya Wischerath.
- Best Community Service by and Individual award, Harvey Milk LGBT Democratic Club
- Visibility Award and Volunteer of the Year, GAPA Community HIV Prevention Project
- Lifetime Achievement Commendation, CA State Senate
- Most Empowering Transgender Individual in San Francisco, Team SF

== Interviews ==
- Screaming Queens: The Riot at Compton's Cafeteria. A documentary by Susan Stryker.

== Published work ==
- Ching, Tamara. "Stranger in Paradise: Tamara Ching's Journey to the Gender Divide." A. Magazine 3.1 (1993): 85-86

== Personal life ==
Ching lives in the Tenderloin district of San Francisco, where she has lived since 1992.
