= Juana María Rodríguez =

Cuban-American academic

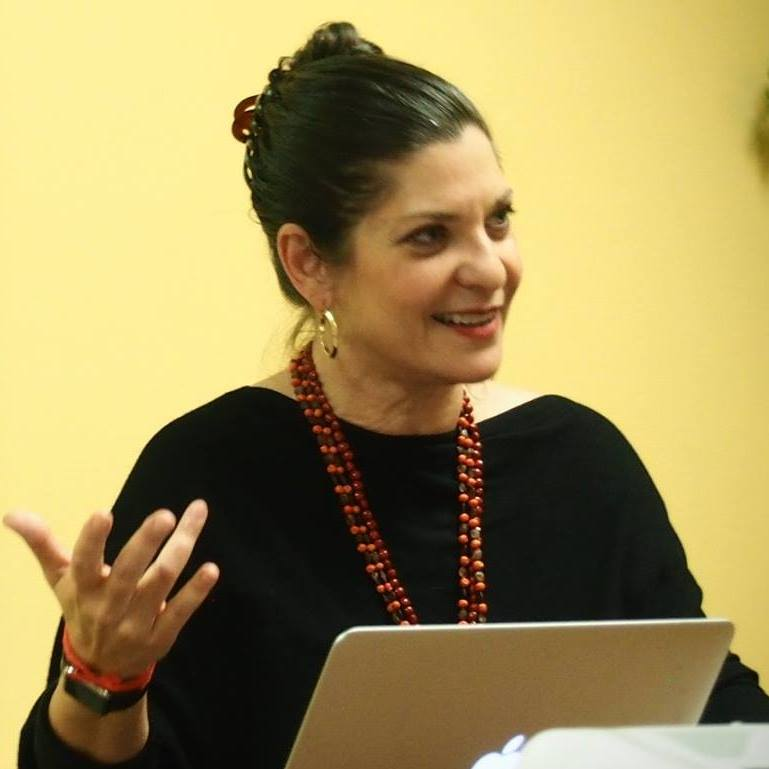
- Lecture at the Center for Race and Gender, University of California, Berkeley, 2016

Juana María Rodríguez is a Cuban-American professor of Ethnic Studies, Gender and Women's Studies, and Performance Studies at the University of California, Berkeley. Her scholarly writing in queer theory, critical race theory, and performance studies highlights the intersection of race, gender, sexuality and embodiment in constructing subjectivity.

== Biography ==
Born Juana María de la Caridad Rodríguez y Hernández in Placetas, Cuba, Rodríguez emigrated to the United States in 1963 with her family. She has two siblings: her sister Dinorah de Jesús Rodríguez, an experimental filmmaker and visual artist who works between Havana and Miami, and a brother. Rodríguez is bisexual, and has published work about what she terms "bisexual erasure."

=== Education and career ===
Describing herself as an "accidental academic" in reference to her working class upbringing, Rodríguez attended City College of San Francisco before graduating with a bachelor's degree from San Francisco State University in Liberal Studies. Her graduate degrees include a Masters in English and Comparative Literature from Columbia University, and a Ph.D. in Ethnic Studies from the University of California, Berkeley where she studied with Norma Alarcón, Judith Butler, VèVè A. Clark, and Gerald Vizenor.

Before joining the faculty at Berkeley, Rodríguez was an Assistant Professor of English at Bryn Mawr College, and an Associate Professor of Women and Gender Studies at the University of California, Davis where she served as Director of the Cultural Studies Graduate Group.

At Berkeley, she is affiliated with the Center for Race and Gender, the Center for New Media, the Center for the Study of Sexual Culture and the Haas Institute for a Fair and Equitable Society, where she was a founding member of the LGBTQ Citizen Cluster.

In 2014, she was appointed to the University of California President's Advisory Committee on LGBT Students, Staff, and Faculty Member by Janet Napolitano.

== Academic contributions ==
The author of three monographs, Puta Life: Seeing Latinas, Working Sex (Duke UP, 2023); Sexual Futures, Queer Gestures, and Other Latina Longings (NYU 2014) and Queer Latinidad: Identity Practices, Discursive Spaces (NYU Press, 2003), Rodríguez has also published essays in GLQ: a Journal of Lesbian and Gay Studies; Women & Performance: a journal of feminist theory; Radical History Review; PMLA; MELUS; Profession and others. Rodríguez's work is considered part of queer of color critique, an intervention into queer theory that argues that sexuality can not be understood or analyzed outside of the ways it is mutually constituted by race and other dimensions of difference.

=== Queer Latinidad: Identity Practices, Discursive Spaces ===
Rodríguez's first book, Queer Latinidad: Identity Practices, Discursive Spaces (NYU Press, 2003) introduced the idea of queer latinidad as a way to disarticulate the ways that history, geography, colonialism, ethnicity, nationality, language, religion, legal status, immigration status, class, color, and the politics of location exist to complicate facile notions of Latino identity. In that book, Rodríguez identifies three case studies that involve different understandings of ethnic and sexual identity: activism through the queer Latino/a HIV prevention agency Proyecto ContraSIDA por Vida; law through the asylum case of Marcelo Tenorio, a gay Afro-Brazilian who was granted political asylum in the United States based on sexual persecution; and cyberspace by examining the internet chatrooms of the IRC (Internet Relay Chat) an early form of digital connectivity.

==== Queering Spanish language ====
In her chapter on the IRC, "'Welcome to the Global Stage': Confessions of a Latina Cyber-Slut" in Queer Latinidad, Rodríguez documents the use of the "@" or arroba in words like Latin@, amig@s, or nostr@s seen in the Spanish language digital spaces she studied, as a "creative linguistic intervention in the highly gendered structure of Spanish." She writes, "Unlike the slash in words such as Latinos/as or amigas/os, which maintains a gender binary while attempting to be inclusive, the @ or "at sign," literally marks where an individual is at in terms of gender." She has also discussed the use of the "x" in terms such as Latinx and other approaches to the ungendering or queering of Spanish, although she also argues that gender can also be a site of pleasure and affirmation.

=== Sexual Futures, Queer Gestures, and Other Latina Longings ===
Rodriguez's second book Sexual Futures, Queer Gestures, and Other Latina Longings (NYU Press 2014) looks at queer kinship practices, sodomy laws in Puerto Rico, Latin dance styles, commercials, pornography, burlesque, queer pride marches, alongside sexual practices such as BDSM, polyamory, daddy-play, and butch-femme role playing to examine the relationship between sexual politics and sexual practices. In the book and elsewhere, she highlights how the politics of respectability that surround sexuality inhibit the potential for more radical interventions into public policy and law around sexuality. Throughout the book, she uses the idea of gesture to emphasize non-verbal ways of communicating gendered and ethnic identity, and as a metaphor to think about activist practices that are partial, in-process and incomplete. The book features queer performance artist Xandra Ibarra, and explores the taboo subject of racialized sexual violence.

==== Sexual practices ====
Rodríguez's work is often specifically praised for the ways in which it deals explicitly with queer sexual practices and forms of gender expression such as butch and femme. She frequently uses her own sexual experiences, or what she terms "sexual archives" to illuminate her ideas on racialized abjection, feminine subjection, sexual vulnerability, and femme identity. In her writing, she often references the sensory, particularly touch, as a way to articulate an embodied sexual practice and a writing practice rooted in sociality. In reviews of her work, reviewers frequently remark on her lyrical use of language.

== Other accomplishments ==
=== Awards ===
In 2022, Rodríguez received the Center for Lesbian and Gay Studies Kessler Award, given every year to a scholar and/ or activist who has produced a substantive body of work that has had a significant influence on the field of LGBTQ Studies.

In Fall 2021, Rodríguez was awarded the Berlin Prize by the American Academy in Berlin.

In 2015, her book, Sexual Futures, Queer Gestures, and Other Latina Longings won the Alan Bray Memorial Book Prize, by the GL/Q Caucus of the Modern Language Association and was a Lambda Literary Foundation Finalist for LGBT Studies.

At the University of California, Berkeley, she has won the Social Science Division, Distinguished Teaching Award and the Graduate Assembly's Faculty Mentor Award.

=== Professional affiliations ===
A member of the American Studies Association, the Modern Language Association, and the National Women's Studies Association, she was chair of the Modern Language Association's Committee on the Status of Literatures of People of Color in the United States and edited a collection of essays entitled the "Affirmative Activism Project" on diversity in higher education. She was also elected to the National Council of the American Studies Association for a three-year term in 2013.

=== Public engagement ===
A frequent public speaker and writer, Rodríguez has also published articles on the Orlando nightclub shooting, diversity in Higher Education, gay marriage, and bisexuality.
