= National Association of Black and White Men Together =

American LGBTQ and racial equality organization

National Association of Black and White Men Together, Inc.
- Formation: 1980; 46 years ago
- Type: Non-profit educational
- Headquarters: Hollywood, CA
- Website: Official website

The National Association of Black and White Men Together, Inc.: A Gay Multiracial Organization for All People (NABWMT) is a network of chapters across the United States focused on LGBTQ and racial equality, founded in May, 1980 in San Francisco as a consciousness-raising, multicultural organization and support group for gay men forming multiracial relationships. To attain these ends, its local chapters organized social gatherings and engaged in educational, cultural, and political activities. It is a registered IRS 501(c)(3) nonprofit organization. NABWMT's goals consist of two major themes: combating racism within the LGBT community and combating homophobia in general society.

== History and Impact ==
NABWMT got its start in May 1980 when founder Michael Smith placed an advertisement in The Advocate for a potluck that attracted 20 people. Within a year of its founding, local chapters were established in New York, Boston, Philadelphia, Washington DC, Los Angeles, Memphis, Chicago, Detroit, Atlanta, and Milwaukee. Chapters named "Black and White Men Together," "Men of All Colors Together," "GREAT (Gay Racially Equal And Together) Men of (city)," and "People of All Colors Together" which include women, all operate under the NABWMT umbrella. Local chapters host social and educational events, and also support other aspects of their communities. For example, the Detroit chapter raised funds for and provided direct assistance to the Ruth Ellis Center in 2006.

As a result of AIDS education and support work carried out by chapters, the National Task Force on AIDS Prevention (NTFAP) and Bay Area HIV Support and Education Services (BAHSES) both sprung from NABWMT in the late 1980s. In 1980, Reggie Williams, an executive director of NABWMT and NTFAP, began to reach out to Black gay and bisexual men, as well as other gay men of color communities in San Francisco.

== Conventions ==
The first national convention was held in San Francisco in 1981

=== Notable Convention Speakers ===
- Walter Naegle (Bayard Rustin's partner for the last decade of Rustin's life (1977–87)), and historian, Dr. Martin Duberman, Newark, 2015.
- United States Surgeon General Dr. Joycelyn Elders, San Diego, 2012
- Chris Bartlett, executive director of the William Way LGBT Community Center, Philadelphia, 2009
- Pauline Park, Cleveland, 2007
- Ohio State Representative Sandra Williams, Cleveland, 2007
- Joseph Fairchild Beam (editor of the ground-breaking anthology of black gay literature, In the Life, Milwaukee, 1987.

== Archives ==
Materials relating to the organization are held by the ONE National Gay & Lesbian Archives at the USC Libraries, described in an Online Archive of California collection guide. The collection includes photographs documenting activities in the Los Angeles area, including images by photographer Miles R. Everitt.
