= Jaime Cortez =

Chicano-American graphic novelist, visual artist, writer, teacher, and performer

Jaime Cortez is a Chicano-American graphic novelist, visual artist, writer, teacher, and performer. Cortez is also known for his role as an LGBT rights activist, and HIV/AIDS prevention work.

== Early years ==
Cortez was born in the agricultural town of San Juan Bautista, California to working-class parents. At eight years old he moved to Watsonville, California. He is the second of three children, with two sisters.

Cortez was first introduced to the arts in elementary school but did not take his first formal art class until he was in seventh grade. During this time, Cortez describes his early passion for drawing as a way to cope with feeling like an outsider at school. As a self-proclaimed nerd, Cortez recalls this time as when "nerds were nerds, unlike now, when nerd is a code word for cool." Cortez further recalls that his love of drawing at an early age lead him to steal money from his mother's purse to buy a drawing pad. He filled this drawing pad with comic book imagery, and imitations of advertisements for beauty salons.

He moved to San Francisco in 1993 and lived there for ten years among the city's queer Latino artistic community.

== Education ==
Cortez attended the University of Pennsylvania where he graduated with a bachelor's degree in Communications and minor in English in 1987. He was the first in his family to graduate from college. Due to what Cortez describes as "working-class issues", at this period in time he felt that studying art would be a frivolous subject matter.

Later in his life after establishing his career in the arts, Cortez attended the University of California, Berkeley where he pursued his Master's of Fine Arts (Art Practice), graduating in 2006.

== HIV/AIDS prevention activism ==
Following his completion of college, Cortez spent two years teaching English at the Ichikawa High School in Yamanashi Ken, Japan.

Upon his return to the United States, an ill Cortez sought medical treatment for ulcerative colitis, and while at the doctor was asked about his sexual history by a nurse. In an interview with ColorLines Cortez recalls "The moment I told her I was gay," he said, "she literally took her hands off me." Thus, he witnessed firsthand the fear, confusion, and biases toward HIV/AIDS patients. Following this incident, Cortez became an HIV/AIDS prevention activist. From 1993 to 1995 he was Assistant to the Director of the Gay and Lesbian Medical Association and the Education Coordinator for the NAMES Project Foundation /AIDS Memorial Quilt from 1995 to 1997. Additionally, Cortez organized discussion groups for gay men to create a community and talk about issues, such as dating across HIV status.

== Notable works ==
Cortez has worked in various mediums of art production and teaching throughout his career.

=== Gordo ===
Published in 2021, Gordo is a semi autobiographical collection of short stories set in a migrant farmworker camp in Watsonville, California. Mateo Askaripour in the NYT Book Review describes "it as an irresistible mix of childlike desire, piercing observation and ridiculous, but relatable, shenanigans, including wrestling matches and the plundering of a porn collection, along with more serious matters, such as final goodbyes, the spinning acrobatics of masculinity and questions of what it means to truly love someone."

=== Sexilo / Sexile ===
As part of his HIV/AIDS prevention work, Cortez wrote and illustrated Sexile/Sexilo, a bilingual graphic novel that depicts the true life story of Adela Vasquez, a Cuban transgender immigrant who arrives to the United States and explores her sexuality, gender and identity among a vibrant but dangerous time in queer communities. It was published in 2004 by the Institute for Gay Men's Health. The graphic novel has been published in both Spanish and English with translation done by Omar Baños and consultation by Adela Vasquez. According to Cortez, the project took approximately 800 hours of work to complete.

Cortez first interviewed Vasquez about her life story while working for the PBS station KQED. Impressed by her story, Cortez contacted Vasquez one year later about having her become the subject of his new graphic novel. Working with AIDS Project Los Angeles, Cortez created this graphic novel as an HIV prevention publication that would exhibit the gay and/or transgender lifestyle as unapologetic. Cortez credits the word Sexile to Puerto Rican academic Manolo Guzman. It defines the state of people who have been cast out from their culture and families. On why he felt this was an important story to be told Cortez says "Not just because I'm a queer, a child of immigrants, or a lover of both comics and sexual narratives, but because this story is so fucked up, fabulous, raggedy and human that it opens a vast space where we can all ponder our own sense of risk, exile and home."

==== Reception ====
Sexile has been positively received in the LGBTQ community. In 2004 Sexile was nominated as the National Association of Public Libraries' Queer Book of the Year. Images from Sexile are published in No Straight Lines: Four Decades of Queer Comics by Justin Hall who refers to the work as art "made during the [HIV/AIDS] plague". "LGBTQ cartoonists' responses to this holocaust were varied... Sexile provided an intimate look into people's fear, anger, despair as well as courage and precarious hope in the face of such a profound challenge."

Because of its focus on a marginalized community, this text has been used in multiple scholarly journals and essays which discuss the treatment and representation of transgender people, immigrants, and members of the LGBTQ community. "Queer/ Migration: An Unruly Body of Scholarship" by Eithne Luibheid discusses Sexile as an example of the bad treatment and further discrimination of immigrants who are queer.

On the basis of its bilingual content and exploration of multiple aspects of the self, Sexile is used as the frame for the article titled "Crossing the Lines: Graphic (Life) Narratives and Co-laborative Political Transformations" by Theresa M. Tensuan. This article analyzes stories of sexual-exchanges, self-invention and social norms. Cortez's work, focusing on transgender transformation is analyzed by Tension to question personal translations across "linguistic, national, and cultural borders."

=== Writing, editing and performance ===
Published in October 1999, Virgins, Guerrillas, and Locas: Gay Latinos Writing about Love is an anthology composed by twenty-one contemporary gay Latino writers, many of whom had never been published, and edited by Cortez. The content includes stories about sightings of the Virgen de Guadalupe by a cholo drug addict, lovers with physical disabilities, and the dynamics of father-son relationships. Thematically similar to This Bridge Called My Back, and anthology by women of color edited by Cherrie Moraga and Gloria Anzaldua, Virgins, Guerrillas, and Locas: Gay Latinos Writing about Love is one of the first publications which exclusively explored queer narratives for and by people of color.

In the year 2000 he was a member of Latin Hustle, a trio of gay writers/performers which included Adriana Gordon and Al Lujan who produced shows such as "Full Frontal Rudity" and "Hoodwink". "Hoodwink" is a show of comedy skits that represent life in the Gay Latin community of San Francisco. It opened at the Theatre Rhinoceros in San Francisco in March 2000.

Additionally, Cortez has had short stories, photographs, and essays published in magazines, books and anthologies which include: Besame Mucho (1999), 2sexE, Best Gay Erotica 2001, Familiar Men (2003), Tea Party Literary Journal (2003), Corpus I, II, IV Gay Men's Health Magazine (2002), Turnover (2005), Street Art San Francisco (2009), Why are Faggots so Afraid of Faggots? (2012), Viz Inter-Arts (2012), No Straight Lines (2012), Kindergarde: Avant Garde Writing for Children (2013) and more.

== Influences ==
In interviews Cortez has discussed being inspired by fairy tales, mythologies, hip-hop music, as well as popular culture. Many of Cortez's works are also inspired by the communities he is a part of. His works consistently have themes of gay life style, the narratives of people of color, the AIDS pandemic and the city of San Francisco, specifically the Mission District.

== Awards and honors ==
- 2011 – Finalist for the James D. Houston First Book Award, by Heyday Press
- 2010 – Awarded the Printed Matter Grant, for Artist Books
- 2009 – City of Oakland Cultural Funding Program Artist Grant
- 2006 – Ollin Cultural Award for outstanding community cultural work, from Instituto Familiar de la Raza
- 2006 – J. Ruth Kelsey Merit Travel Award, UC Berkeley Department of Art Practice
- 2006 – Finalist for the 2006 Independent Publishers Award for LGBT book "Turnover"
- 2005 – Eisner award for highest achievement in the humanities, UC Berkeley
- 2004 – Received Javitz scholarship for promising graduate students, UC Berkeley
- 2004 – Nominated for the National Library Association Award graphic novel "Sexile"
- 2001 – Received Community Artist Award, from Quelaco
