= Diane Felix =

American disc jockey and LGBT activist

Diane Francis Christine Felix (born March 15, 1953), also known as Chili D, is an American disc jockey and LGBT activist. She is a third-generation Chicana from Stockton, California.

== Early life ==
Felix was born in Stockton, California, on March 15, 1953. Her mother was from Fresno, California, and her father was from Texas. Her parents were second-generation Chicanos from farm-working families. She attended San Joaquin Delta College in Stockton, where she learned to DJ. She worked at Intel while at San Jose State University. She later started her own business, Felix Computers, building computers at home while in San Francisco.

== Activism ==
Diane Felix attributes her passion for activism to various events that she experienced including the murder of Chicano journalist Ruben Salazar by police during the National Chicano Moratorium March against the Vietnam War.

=== United Farm Workers (UFW) ===
Felix became involved with the United Farm Workers (UFW) after Cesar Chavez gave a talk at her high school. She helped organize the grape boycott in San Francisco and Los Angeles.

=== Gay Latina/Latino Alliance (GALA) ===
Felix first became interested in the Gay Latino Alliance, formed in November 1975, after reading an ad in the Bay Area Reporter. The ad called for a meeting between gay Latinos who were interested in political organizing. Her trip to San Francisco to attend the second general meeting of the group resulted in her permanent relocation to San Francisco from San Jose. She became one of the three lesbians in the group, alongside Alí Marerro and Matú Feliciano, and played a large role in the development of the group.

The organization meant to tackle the racism present in the LGBT community, demand political change, and provide a community for gay Latinos. It eventually changed its named to the Gay Latina/Latino Alliance (GALA) and a Women's Caucus was formed. They partook in and coordinated an assortment of events, including a march against Anastasio Somoza García, the 73rd and 76th Nicaraguan president, as well as various dance parties.

Despite Felix's efforts to address the misogyny in the group, the sexism escalated when two GALA members, Anthony Lopez and Manuel Quijano, sold their house to buy a bar. The bar, Esta Noche, had hired lesbian bartenders who often would get straight men coming in and harassing them. In response, the owners said that it wasn't a political organization and that they did not want to hear about it.

The group eventually disbanded due to internal issues, including sexism and lack of funding.

=== Community United in Response to AIDS/SIDA (CURAS) ===
In 1983, Felix co-founded the Community United in Response to AIDS/SIDA (CURAS). It was the first grassroots Latino community response to the outbreak of AIDS in San Francisco. She began as a volunteer, but later became office manager for the group. She then moved into a new position, working as an outreach member for the project. Later, she transitioned into the role of the coordinator of outreach. She was a health educator for the organization before it lost its funding and dissolved in 1992.

She also created the program Curanderas, which was later renamed to Mujeres Unidas and Activistas, to address health education and provide health services to immigrant women in the Mission District in San Francisco.

=== Proyecto ContraSIDA Por Vida (PCPV) ===
In 1993, Felix co-founded Proyecto ContraSIDA Por Vida (PCPV), a community-based organization dedicated to providing sex-positive health education to queer communities. While there, she held various positions, such as Program Director and Coordinator of Women's Programs.

Felix coordinated various projects while at the agency to address Latina lesbian and bisexual health, including the project Lesbianas y Bisexuales Respondiendo con Educación Sexual (LYBRES). LYBRES passed out contraceptives at bars to promote safe sex and also held workshops and discussion for women. Another project she oversaw was the educational performance group called ¡Sinvergüenza! The group performed skits about their experiences, sexual health, and other relevant topics on the last Saturday of every month at Felix's club, Colors.

Proyecto ContraSIDA Por Vida was active until 2005.

== Art ==
=== DJing ===
Felix first began DJing in the early 1970s while at San Joaquin Delta College in Stockton. She secured a position with a Chicano station, KUOP, as a DJ. Felix began to DJ at A Little More on Potrero Hill, a predominantly Filipina club, in 1976. She hosted the first club night for queer Latina women in the Mission District in 1986 and called it Colors. It closed in 2000.

Since arriving in San Francisco, she has been a pivotal person in producing, hosting, and promoting queer Latino-themed club nights in the Bay Area including Cream at Space 550 and Kandy in the Castro District, Octopussy in San Jose, the dance party Delicious at The Cafe in San Francisco, and the all-gender queer Latino dance party Pan Dulce.

She played on the Latin Stage of the San Francisco Gay and Lesbian Parade for seven years. She has also played at Circus and The Arena in Los Angeles.

=== Theatre ===
In 1971, she wrote two of the three plays selected for a theatrical series at San Joaquin Delta College. The first play, titled La Macha, is about a high school Chicana grappling with the misogyny she faces at home from her family. She has a dream about a world in which gender roles are reversed and where she comes home from work in a suit to her homemaking husband. The second play is a romance about two star-crossed lovers. One of the characters is the son of a farm owner and the other character is a Chicana protesting the labor conditions existing at the farm with the United Farm Workers. They are unable to be open about their interest in each other because of their roles so they sneak around and only communicate publicly via exchanges of glances and material possessions.

She was first involved with El Teatro Campesino in Juan Bautista, but later joined Teatro de la Gente when she moved to San Jose. She eventually left Teatro de la Gente due to homophobia from other members of the group. She became involved in theatre again at a city college.

== Honors and distinctions ==
In 2000, Felix was awarded the Local Hero Award as a part of San Francisco's Lesbian and Gay Pride Month commemoration. The same year, she was also recognized for her work with Proyecto ContraSIDA Por Vida in the Gay, Lesbian, Bisexual, Transgender Historical Society of Northern California's 15th anniversary celebration.

In 2013, Felix was selected by board members of the San Francisco Pride Celebration Committee to serve as a grand marshal for the event.

== See also ==
- Hank M. Tavera
- Proyecto ContraSIDA por Vida
