= Strange Fruit: A Dutch Queer Collective =

Strange Fruit was a Dutch queer collective active in the Netherlands from 1989 to 2002. They worked to challenge their marginalization within both their ethnic communities and the Dutch gay scene. With a focus on a non-hierarchical self-help approach, they offered support and conversation without taking the role of experts. Instead they used creative discourse, activism, art and poetry to implement change. Their activism and work was definitely ground breaking in Europe, but is not widely recognized around the world.

== History ==
Strange Fruit originated in Amsterdam in 1989 and was created by Muslim and Afro-Caribbean youth who felt marginalized within the society they lived in. Amsterdam is thought of as a very liberal town; with "values of humanism, equality and tolerance" yet migrants and people of colour in particular within the queer community faced discrimination that did not reflect these values. Whilst queer culture was embraced and celebrated, Muslim queers and queers of colour were marginalized. Strange Fruit responded to that by creating safe spaces for queer Muslims and queers of colour, who also made up the body of members active in the organization.

Strange Fruit embraced, what normative society considered, "non canonical bodies" . Brown and Black bodies were marginalized and othered because they were seen as "unable to fit" within the western cultural ideal so therefore they were not acceptable. They were seen as unable to attain a true gay identity because they did not fall under the conceptualized "white standard" of being queer . As such these bodies were considered bodies as not able to "properly be gay." Next to their activism within the queer community, Strange Fruit recognized and responded to the struggles queer people of colour faced within their respective communities.

In their practice Strange Fruit embraced a non-hierarchical and self-help approach . They aimed to not conform to the ideals of the COC - an LGBT organization active in Amsterdam at the time - and instead took on their own structure and their own approach. Everyone within the group was considered an equal and there was not a specified director or member that had more control than others. Whilst started as a grass-roots activist group without formal structure, Strange Fruit later became an independent foundation.

Strange Fruit advocated for finding ways that made the group united, not what would divide or marginalize individuals within the group further. This meant that the group did not just consist of queer Muslim men but consisted of African, Middle Eastern, Afro-Dutch, Asians, Asian-Dutch and women. There were no limitations to who could join or become involved it was an open and welcoming space. Members of Strange Fruit tended to be youth with a migration background who lived under "precarious conditions" and were often involved in "sex work". The group was sensitive to that and catered and offered support in light of these issues.

Strange Fruit operated for over a decade and came to an end in 2002. There were a multitude of factors that enabled their success. Tayeb notes that their ability to avoid instilling normative practices was one key factor in being so influential. Other factors include their "fusionist approach in combining cultural influences, their consistent outreach programs, their key self help principle, and keeping hierarchical order to an absolute minimum and instead maintaining an even ground between members and the target group". Their principles and influence reached beyond European borders which made them that much more effective and successful.

== Activities ==
Strange Fruit took on a creative approach and used a variety of mediums to convey their key messages and forms of support. Whilst they emphasised the migrant perspective as their primary concern in their activities, Strange Fruit organized various projects, offered support sessions, discussion nights and actions on a range of topics. This included conversations on LGBT culture and their struggles in Amsterdam, with a specific focus on being gay in the communities that were represented within Strange Fruit. Examples of their involvement in other events is their relation to the Denkvloer Conference in 1996 where they carried out a poetry poster project where lesbians of colour across the world (including women within Strange Fruit) created one hundred posters with poetry expressing the struggle of being both queer and coloured.

=== Safe sex and HIV/AIDS awareness ===
The group offered a broad spectrum of support when it came to HIV/AIDS awareness. They organized weekly discussions on safe sex practices, AIDS education seminars and AIDS awareness actions targeting clubs frequented by queers of colour. They created a safe space for queers of color to come and be themselves and meet others like themselves. They addressed the specific issues they faced within their immediate communities. Jai Haime was one of the group's members who was heavily involved in the group's cultural activism and promoted outreach programs focusing on AIDS. Haime coordinated events such as "safe sex parties" that were exclusive to members that promoted safe sex practices.

==== Cause of Death: Nothing ====
Another member of Strange Fruit who was actively involved in addressing HIV/AIDS was Dutch filmmaker Andre Reeder; he created a documentary in 1996 entitled Cause of Death: Nothing which was a "moving portrait of the Dutch Surinamese community's response to the AIDS crisis". In the documentary Reeder addresses the denial and stigma surrounding AIDS in the Surinamese community. The title derives from a conversation he had with the brother of a friend who died. Whilst Reeder was aware that he died from AIDS related causes, the brother stated that he had died "from nothing." The film was broadcast on cable network MTV (Migrant Television). In an interview with Reeder in 2019, he describes the impact of the film on the Surinamese community, stating:

"We are only half a million population in Suriname, but, I think everybody who could see it saw it. All of a sudden I and other people from my team got telephone calls from people saying that they had seen the film, and of course, for those times, it broke taboos because I think in general AIDS was a big taboo in society, but in particular in our community."

Tayeb explains how the film emphasizes how Strange fruit as a collective goes against the "dominant dogma" within the Netherlands and instead embraces traditions from migrant and minority cultures. Strange Fruit mixed traditions together to enforce a diverse experience appreciating all cultures involved from "African customs to Oriental traditions".

=== Legal support for Refugees ===
Queer refugees when coming to the Netherlands face troubles with getting granted refugee status. In order to be granted refugee status they are expected to provide "proof of anti-queer policies within home countries". This can be very difficult because how would they access this type of information in a form that is providable; Strange fruit uses an "alternative archive which provides legal support to these refugees" helping them attain their refugee status. They also offer emotional support. They used personal stories of people who did not have the option to live freely as queer within their nations. Strange fruit also worked directly with lawyers to help refugees. They also worked with "Vluchtelingenwerk" which was the nation's largest refugee support organization, they worked against homophobic policies. Strange Fruit took on a very artistic approach and emphasized self-expression and held poetry workshops for refugees.

=== Global Perspectives ===
Strange Fruit ran a radio program called Global Perspectives in which they discussed topics ranging from LGBT culture; African American literature, theatre, dance, music; LGBT struggles and events in Amsterdam; Black and migrant cultures in Amsterdam and being gay in these communities; news and developments from community-members' countries of origin - Suriname, Morocco, Curaçao, Turkey, Ghana; and HIV and AIDS in black and migrant as well as global perspective. The program was broadcast by a local LGBT media club MVS and ran by four members of Strange Fruit; Andre Reeder as presenter, Marlon Reina as producer, Kenneth McRooy as columnist, and technical support from MVS. Marlon Reina says of the importance of the radio program: "The radio was important as it was (in the pre-internet period) Strange Fruit's only communication tool."

== Homophobia in Islam ==
One of the group's main incentives is to provide support to members in light of the ridicule they face from their cultural community, especially in the Muslim culture. Being gay or queer and Muslim was considered an oxymoron in Islam, you could not be one as well as the other, you had to be either or. The idea of "coming out" was not seen as necessary nor was it common because being open about a queer sexuality was not seen as possible. Many migrant/minority gays and lesbians were forced to live a "double life" because if they were to be open about their sexuality it would bring shame to their families and communities. The relationship between Islam and homosexuality is one that is considered to be "antagonistic." European culture is quite Islamophobic and Islam is quite homophobic so individuals who identified as both were left in an alienated space. Muslim culture in Islam is rooted in customs and traditions (as this is exemplified through subtle traditions as the hijab) and therefore exercising the mobility of modernity and modern ways of life (i.e.: queer culture) could be problematic. Homosexuality is in a way not acknowledged as a real thing within Islam; it is understood that you cannot be queer and be Muslim, if you are queer you go against what it is to be Muslim. This is where the difficulty comes, these individuals are shunned from their Muslim communities because they cannot identify as gay and then as a Muslim and neither can they identify as Muslim and then properly identify as gay or queer, leaving them no space to fit. They are left as marginalized beings who hold no space in society. Momin Rahman discusses the issues of a queer intersectionality where individuals who try to identify as both get caught in this problematic space where they end up feeling like they are not much of either. Rahman also discusses the difficulty these identity categories and identity politics create difficult and complex boundaries where they cannot feel free to be who they are, they end up being mindful of being enough of the other identity.

It is important to recognize that this issue does not only lie on the solely the homophobia within Muslim culture, but also there is an issue with Western gay exclusivity and the affirmations of queer culture that Western society likes to paint as strictly for those who fit the western ideal. It is a never ending battle and struggle on both ends of identity.

== Sources ==
- Colpani; Isenia; Pieter (2019). "Archiving queer of colour politics in the Netherlands : A roundtable conversation". Tijdschrift voor Genderstudies. 22 (2): 163–182.
