= Xandra Ibarra =

Performance artist

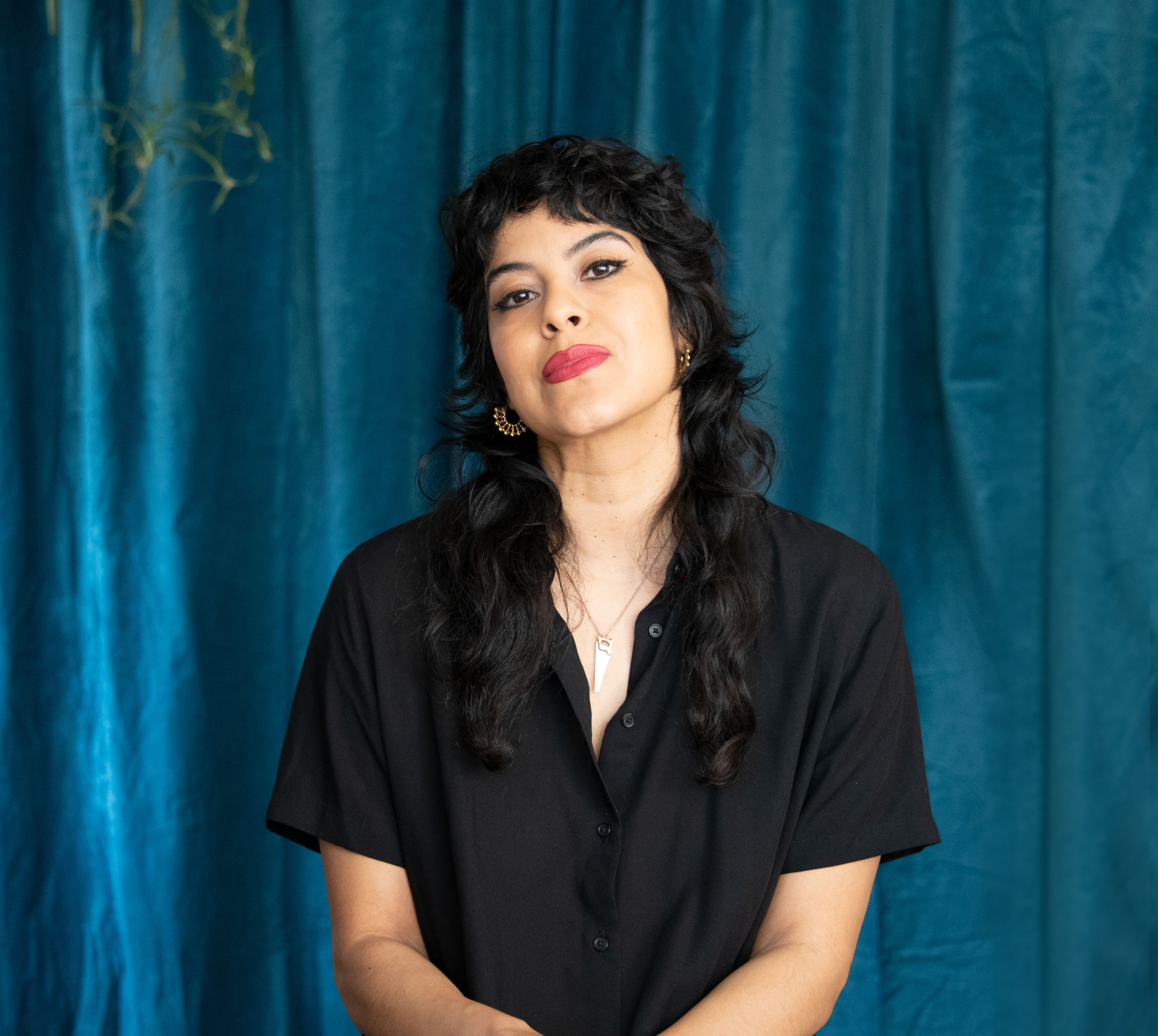
- Ibarra in 2017
- Born: 1979 (age 46–47); El Paso/Juarez
- Other name: La Chica Boom
- Education: Baylor University, San Francisco State University
- Occupations: Performance artist, activist, educator
- Website: http://www.xandraibarra.com

Xandra Ibarra (born 1979), who has sometimes worked under the alias of La Chica Boom, is an American performance artist, activist, and educator. Ibarra works across video, sculpture and performance. She is based in Oakland, California.

== About ==
Born in 1979 in El Paso/Juarez, on the border between Mexico and the United States, Ibarra holds a BA from Baylor University; an MA from San Francisco State University (SFSU); and, in 2020, earned an MFA in Art Practice from the University of California, Berkeley. She performed in musical theatre in early adulthood, and learned burlesque from Sheu Sheu Le'Haure, a local performer. Around the same time Ibarra was active with the national anti-violence groups Incite! and CARA (Communities Against Rape and Abuse).

Since 2020, she has been a senior lecturer at California College of the Arts (CCA) within the Critical Studies department. She previously worked as a lecturer at San Francisco State University in the Ethnic Studies department. Ibarra has been an activist in the prison abolition movement and community organizing for the anti-rape movement.

== Work ==
=== Performances ===
==== Spictacles series (2002–2012) ====
Ibarra performed "spictacles" under the moniker of La Chica Boom from 2002 until 2012. Spictacles, a term coined by Ibarra, "mixed and repurpose traditional Mexican iconography alongside racist tropes within the erotic and sensual vocabulary of burlesque." One example of such a performance is La Tortillera, exhibited starting in 2004. Tortillera in this instance, is being used as both a descriptor for someone who makes tortillas, and also as the derogatory Spanish slang term for "lesbian". The performance consists of Ibarra in "traditional" colorful Mexican tortillera dress. Although she singles out the Mexican housewife stereotype, this is also the attire that high end or 'authentic' Mexican restaurants require of women who stand in panoptical view of their customers, assuring the tortilla's faux homemade authenticity. As the performance progresses, Ibarra sheds more and more items of clothing, in the tradition of burlesque, until she dons nothing but her pasties and a Tapatío bottle attached to a strap-on, which she then uses to cum on the tortilla before consuming it."

In the traveling art exhibition, XicanX: New Visions, curated by Dos Mestizx (Suzy González and Michael Menchaca) included Ibarra's La Tortillera (2004) video. When the exhibition traveled to Centro de Artes in San Antonio, Texas (February 2020 – June 2020), Ibarra's artwork was abruptly removed by the City of San Antonio because they claimed "obscene content" which "did not align with community standards." The City funds the art space, Centro de Artes, and it spurred the debate on the role of public support within the arts and freedom of speech. A petition was created against the city's decision.

==== Fuck My Life (FML) (2012, 2013) ====
Ibarra performed Fuck My Life (FML) first at the CounterPULSE (San Francisco) in 2012 and then at The Wild Project (New York) in 2013. The performance was "a mute spectacle that explores the backstory and failure of Ibarra's burlesque persona, La Chica Boom". She juxtaposes the rumored death of Lupe Vélez with the life of La Chica Boom "to illuminate how performing racially perverse material often fails because it is read and embodied as reality by (white) audiences". Her performance uses "being fucked" as the aesthetic project to show "being stuck between the desire to be outside of racist and sexist frames and the desire to contest them from within", which are all "hampered by the inability to eradicate the racist and sexist optics on one's own".

==== Nude Laughing (2014, 2016) ====
Ibarra performed Nude Laughing first at the Asian Art Museum (San Francisco) in 2014 and then at The Broad museum in Los Angeles in 2016, where she walks nude while laughing throughout the museum, dragging a nylon sac with paradigmatic "white lady accoutrements". Through this performance, Ibarra uses nudity and the sonic quality of laughter to explore the "vexed relation racialized subjects have to not only one's own skin, but also one's own entanglements and knots (skeins) with whiteness and white womanhood." The piece is inspired from John Currin's 1998 painting titled "Laughing Nude," which features a nude white woman with her face caught in the middle of maniacal laughter that blurs the erotic with the grotesque. In an email to The Huffington Post, Ibarra explains, "I want to capture what I can of these white nudes in my brown figure and skin and enact a union between sound and gesture that can't be captured within a painting." She aims to bring the nudes to life in what she describes as the "wrong" body, enhancing the grotesque, tactile, and expressive dimensions of how she imagines white womanhood.

=== Videos ===
==== Untitled Fucking (2013) ====
The 2013 video, Untitled Fucking, is a collaborative performance work by artists Ibarra and Amber Hawk Swanson that stages a queer intercourse between sex acts and speech acts. Performance studies scholar Juana María Rodriguez examines the video to argue that "feminism also needs to be about imagining a sexual politics that does not require the abandonment of fun and pleasure." She goes on to state that "It is precisely because our sexual realities are so often steeped in abjection and violence that insisting on depictions of sex that represent the viscous substances of our lives becomes so urgent."

=== Photography ===
==== Spic Ecdysis (2014) ====
In her photo essay/series Spic Ecdysis (2014) published and featured on the cover of Women and Performance Journal, Ibarra aligns herself with the figure of the cockroach and "dwells within the limits given—showing the false promise of sheer transformation." The term ecdysis means to shed, molt, it comes from Ancient Greek: ἐκδύω (ekduo), "to take off, strip off." She captures the symbolic process of shedding the skin of a cockroach by laying next to costumes of her former persona La Chica Boom. This photo series specifically embodied "the cockroach in its abjection, disgust, invisibility, hypervisibility, and infestation, along with its state of presumed metamorphosis." She relates the image of the cockroach to "Latinidad and spichood" where despite the efforts of exploring a new self or "new skin", she is still "stuck" with "Latinidad and spichood". In the end, this is all just a repetition of the new self eventually becoming the old self, all remaining within "the order of the same". Her experience of this cycle further demonstrated " the precarity of queer failure and the psychic exhaustion that accompanies the embodiment of racial and sexual abjection", resembling the cockroach as a disturbing and "enduring threat to the purity of home and nation".

== In academic publications ==
Ibarra has attracted the attention of various scholars of performance, gender, and race. Juana María Rodríguez, a professor at the University of California, Berkeley writes about Ibarra's performance and the erotics of the Mexico–United States border in her book Sexual Futures, Queer Gestures and Other Latina Longings and in her essay "Viscous Pleasures and Unruly Feminisms" in GLQ.

Amber Jamilla Musser's Sexual Excess: Queer Femininity and Brown Jouissance (2018) book includes a chapter about Ibarra's collaboration with performance artist Amber Hawk Swanson, "Untitled Fucking" (2013).

Leticia Alvarado's Abject Performances: Aesthetic Strategies in Latino Cultural Production (2018) features Ibarra's performance work "Skins/Less Here" (2015) on the cover and in the conclusion.

Ivan Ramos, a Professor at the University of Maryland writes about La Chica Boom's performances ' Tortillera and Untitled Fucking. Ramos discusses Ibarra's incorporation of the symbolic Tapatio bottle across many of her performances and discusses how this calls attention to the history of denigration of Mexicans, carried out through the harsh criticisms of the spiciness of Mexican cuisine. Ramos writes about the ways La Chica Boom appropriates and plays with the stereotypes of Mexicans as unsanitary, obnoxiously flavorful, and over sexualized, in order to dismantle them. The author connects Ibarra to the Chicana/o art collective founded in the 1960s, Asco.
