= National Queer Asian Pacific Islander Alliance =

American federation of LGBTQ organizations

- Founded: 2007
- Region served: United States of America
- Method: Campaigning, advocacy, support groups, public speaking, education
- Website: www.nqapia.org/wpp/

The National Queer Asian Pacific Islander Alliance (NQAPIA) is an American federation of Asian American, South Asian, Southeast Asian. and Pacific Islander LGBTQ organizations. NQAPIA was formed in 2007, as an outgrowth of the LGBT APA Roundtable working groups at the 2005 National Gay Lesbian Task Force Creating Change Conference in Oakland, California. NQAPIA seeks to build the capacity of local LGBT AAPI organizations, invigorate grassroots organizing, develop leadership, and challenge homophobia, racism, and anti-immigrant bias. The organization "focuses on grass-roots organizing and leadership development."

NQAPIA works with local LGBTQ AAPI groups to address a wide range of LGBTQ AAPI issues such as speaking out for immigration reform, partnering with the National Gay & Lesbian Task Force on a national survey of the needs and concerns of LGBTQ AAPIs, support convenings for queer women and South Asians, leading workshops on organizing LGBTQ AAPIs for social change, and hosting national trainings and issue briefings for leaders of LGBTQ AAPI organizations.

== Profile of LGBTQ AAPI Organizations ==
Thirty-four LGBTQ AAPI organizations from across the United States are members of NQAPIA. Two are national organizations. Most LGBTQ AAPI organizations are located in areas with large populations of Asian Americans and Pacific Islanders. The largest population centers are in the San Francisco Bay Area and the Greater Los Angeles Area. Following these are the communities in New York City, the metropolitan Washington, D.C., area, and New England.

Some LGBTQ AAPI organizations are organized by ethnicity or gender.

- Seven are South Asian groups.
- Two are Southeast Asian groups.
- Six serve specific ethnic communities, including Chinese, Filipinos, Vietnamese, and Koreans.
- Five are predominantly women's organizations with Non-Profit Status (three of which are inclusive of transgender people).
- Five are predominantly men's organizations (two of which are inclusive of transgender people).
- Four are LGBTQ projects of mainstream, larger AAPI organizations.
- Three are specifically youth organizations, all of which are housed within larger organizations that also provide staff support.

== Map of lesbian, gay, bisexual, and transgender Asian American, South Asian, and Pacific Islander organizations ==
=== Pacific Northwest ===
1. API Pride of Portland, Oregon
2. Trikone – Northwest, Northwest, Seattle, Washington
3. UTOPA – Seattle, Washington
4. Project Q of API, Chaya, Seattle, Washington
5. Pride ASIA, Seattle, Washington

=== Northern California ===
6. API Equality — Northern California, San Francisco, California
7. Asian Pacific Islander Queer Women and Transgender Community (APIQWTC), Bay Area, California
8. GLBTQ+ Asian Pacific Alliance (GAPA), San Francisco
9. South Bay Queer and Asian, San Jose, California
10. Trikone, San Francisco, California
11. UTOPIA – San Francisco, California

=== Southern California ===
12. API PFLAG San Gabriel Valley, California
13. Barangay, Los Angeles, California
14. Satrang, Los Angeles, California
15. Koreans United for Equality (KUE), California
16. UTOPIA – San Diego, California
17. Viet Rainbow Orange County (VROC), California
18. API Pride Council, Los Angeles, California
19. Malaya Project, Los Angeles, California

=== Nevada ===
20. Southern Nevada Asian Pacific Islander Society; Las Vegas, Nevada
21. UTOPIA; Las Vegas, Nevada

=== Midwest ===
22. Shades of Yellow (SOY), Minneapolis, Minnesota
23. Invisible to Invincible: Asian Pacific Islander Pride of Chicago (i2i), IL
24. Trikone, Chicago, Illinois
25. Freedom Inc., Madison, Wisconsin

=== The South ===
26. Trikone - Atlanta, Georgia
27. Khush, Texas, Austin, Texas
28. VAYLA – New Orleans, Louisiana

=== New England ===
29. Massachusetts Area South Asian Lambda Association (MASALA), Boston, Massachusetts
30. Queer Asian Pacific-Islander Alliance (QAPA), Boston, Massachusetts

=== Greater New York City Area ===
31. Asian Pride Project, New York
32. Dari Project, New York
33. Gay Asian & Pacific Islander Men of New York (GAPIMNY)
34. Q-Wave, NY
35. SALGA, NY
36. PFLAG NYC Chapter – API Project

=== Mid-Atlantic/Metro D.C. Area ===
35. Asian Pacific Islander Queers United for Action (AQUA), Washington, D.C.
36. Asian Pacific Islander Queer Sisters (APIQS), Washington, D.C.
37. hotpot!, Philadelphia, Pennsylvania
38. Khush – DC, Washington, D.C.

=== Pacific Islands ===
39. Pride Marianas, Spain
40. Guam Alternative Lifestyle Association (GALA)
41. Nolu Ehu, Waianae, Hawaii

=== National ===
42. Muslim Alliance for Sexual and Gender Diversity (MASGD)
43. Network on Religion and Justice (NRJ)
44. Desi lgbtQ Helpline (DeQH)
45. Queer South Asian National Network (QSANN)

=== Participating organizations ===
46. API Equality - Los Angeles, California
47. Providence Youth Student Movement (PrYSM), Providence, Rhode Island

== Activist activities ==
=== Conferences ===
Every three years, NQAPIA coordinates national conferences for queer Asian Pacific Islander American Issues. Prior conferences were held in Seattle, Washington and Washington, D.C., in 2009 and 2012 respectively. In 2015, NQAPIA's conference was held in Chicago, Illinois, from August 6–9, 2015.

=== Goals ===
NQAPIA strives for inclusion of LGBT minority groups in both macro and micro-scopic scales through the use of conferences and community outreach programs. By providing education, social networks of support, and organization of federations and members, it aims to "press a positive agenda" to integrate LGBT racial and ethnic minorities in their communities.

=== Activities ===
- Conferences & summits: discuss racial and transgender issues on an international platform.
- Workshops: raise awareness about a multitude of topics (ranging from skills and professional development to health and wellness).
- Caucuses: create specific networks of support for individualized aid (such as networks based on region).
- Social & cultural activities: educate and acknowledge cultures as a community.

=== Summits ===
The NQAPIA organizes a weekend long training and issues briefing for leaders of LGBTQ API organizations. Local leaders from across the nation convene to network, learn about current issues, share strategies, and build the infrastructure of their respective organizations. In 2013, the NQAPIA Summit was in Hawai’i. NQAPIA Summits alternate between West and East Coasts.

== Programs and campaigns ==
The NQAPIA curates projects and campaigns which empower the queer Asian communities around the nation.

=== LGBT Immigrants' Rights ===
A campaign focused on immigration reform and upholding LGBT Asian American Pacific Islander immigrant rights by "educating local organizations and leaders", engaging in media in various forms and mediums, publicizing the stories of undocumented LGBT Asian American Pacific Islanders (as well as undocumented Latinos), and analyzing immigration reform legislation and the effect that legislation changes will have.

=== Family is Still Family ===
A multilingual campaign focused on educating Asian and Pacific Islander parents of LGBT youth, aimed to guide them in supporting their child and maintaining strong family bonds. This is accomplished through videos translated into Chinese, Korean, Japanese, Indonesian, Vietnamese, Thai, Khmer, Hmong, Lao, Hindi, Tagalog, Ilocano, Arabic, and other languages as well as multilingual leaflets, "family acceptance workshops", advertisements for LGBT pride month, and features on various news channels, such as MSNBC, NBC, and The Korea Times.

=== DACA Undocumented Youth ===
DACA/DAPA are both programs targeted at undocumented immigrants, particularly families. DACA (deferred action for childhood arrivals) allows for individuals to remain in the United States and obtain work permits if they are qualified to do so; however, it is not a route to obtaining permanent residence or citizenship status. Due to "legal challenges", the expanded DACA and DAPA programs are currently unavailable, but the original 2012 DACA program is open to the public. DAPA (deferred action for parental accountability) is orchestrated by the United States Citizenship and Immigration Services in order to temporarily provide aid to undocumented immigrants who are parents of U.S. citizens or lawful permanent residents and provides "relief from deportation and work authorization" for three years, but is currently not accepting applications.

=== Uncovering Our Stories: The Voices of LGBTQ AAPI Immigrants ===
"Uncovering Our Stories" was accomplished with the help of Mia Nakano, a director who worked on numerous other projects with similar themes. Its goal is to uncover the stories of immigrants who are "everyday" LGBT Asian American and Pacific Islanders, but whose stories rarely see coverage. The ultimate mission of this campaign is various levels of immigration reform, including greater family immigration rights and protections. It features Sapna Pandya, Erika Nunez, Tony Choi, Nebula Li, Rajat Dutta, Shweta Jumar, Maya Jafer, Dhaval Shah, John Sanchez, Chetam & Gaurav, Bupendra Ram, Sandy, Erwin de Leon, Alex Ong, Noel Bordador, Urooj Arshad, Linda & Lundy Khoy, and Sahar Shafqat.

=== Multilingual Visibility Postcards ===
Through the use of printed postcards featuring various Asian American and Pacific Islanders, this campaign aims to "increase visibility of LGBT AAPIs". It features a variety of languages, from Korean to Thai to Bengali to Vietnamese, with a motif on front expressing support for same-sex marriage, immigrant rights, and queer/Asian pride.

== Honors and awards ==
=== NQAPIA Community Catalyst Awards ===
The NQAPIA Community Catalyst Awards are awarded to individual and organizations that have:

- performed "substantive work in support of AAPI and/or LGBT communities"
- are capable of drawing sponsors to the event
- can commit to being present at the event

Nominees are accepted through online submission. Past awardees include:

==== 2010 Awardees ====
- Lola Lai Jong, Chicago, IL
- Mohammad Abdollah, Ann Arbor, MI
- Lunar New Year for All Coalition, New York, NY (August 28, 2010 Chicago IL)

==== 2011 Awardees ====
- Lance Toma and the Asian and Pacific Islander Wellness Center, San Francisco, CA
- Sống Thật Radio, San Jose, CA

==== 2012 Awardees ====
- Rep. Mike Honda
- The Asian American Justice Center
- Urooj Arshad

==== 2013 Awardees ====
- Esera Tuaolo
- UNITE HERE! Local 5

==== 2014 Awardees ====
- Andy Marra
- Q-WAVE
- Namita Chad

==== 2015 Awardees ====
===== New York =====
- Dennis Chin
- Clara Yoon
- GABRIELA-USA

===== Chicago =====
- I Li Hsiao
- Liz Thomson
- Marsha and Tad Aizumi (parents of Aiden Aizumi)
- Freedom Inc.

==== 2016 Awardees ====
===== New York =====
- Conrad Ricamora
- Asian/Pacific/American Institute at NYU
- Faisal Alam

===== Boston =====
- Amit Dixit
- Past QAPA Steering Committee Members

===== Washington =====
- Sapna Pandya
- Hector Vargas
- Sharon Wong

== Published work ==
=== Yearly reports ===
NQAPIA releases yearly reports/news magazines detailing their activities, highlights of their national conference (if applicable), various features and articles, award information, financial statements.

=== 2016 election information ===
For the American 2016 election, NQAPIA released a series of reports on the election, including voter guides in Chinese, Hindi, Korean, and Vietnamese; resources to understand the issues each candidate was campaigning on and to protect Asian American Pacific Islander voting rights; and information on how to vote.

=== Current events information ===
Various infographics, articles, letters, blog posts, and the like are posted on a variety of topics related to Asian American Pacific Islanders' issues, such as political events.
