= Q-Wave =

Queer women advocacy group in New York City

- Asian Pride sign created by Q-Wave for the 2009 Heritage of Pride Parade in NYC.
- Formation: 2004
- Location: New York, NY
- Website: www.q-wave.org

Q-Wave is a pro-queer volunteer organization in New York City composed of lesbian, bisexual, trans, and queer women; trans men; and gender non-conforming/non-binary/trans folks of East Asian, Southeast Asian, South Asian, West Asian, and Pacific Islander descent. Q-Wave organizes events aimed at raising support for queer people in AAPI communities and support for AAPI people in queer communities.

== History ==
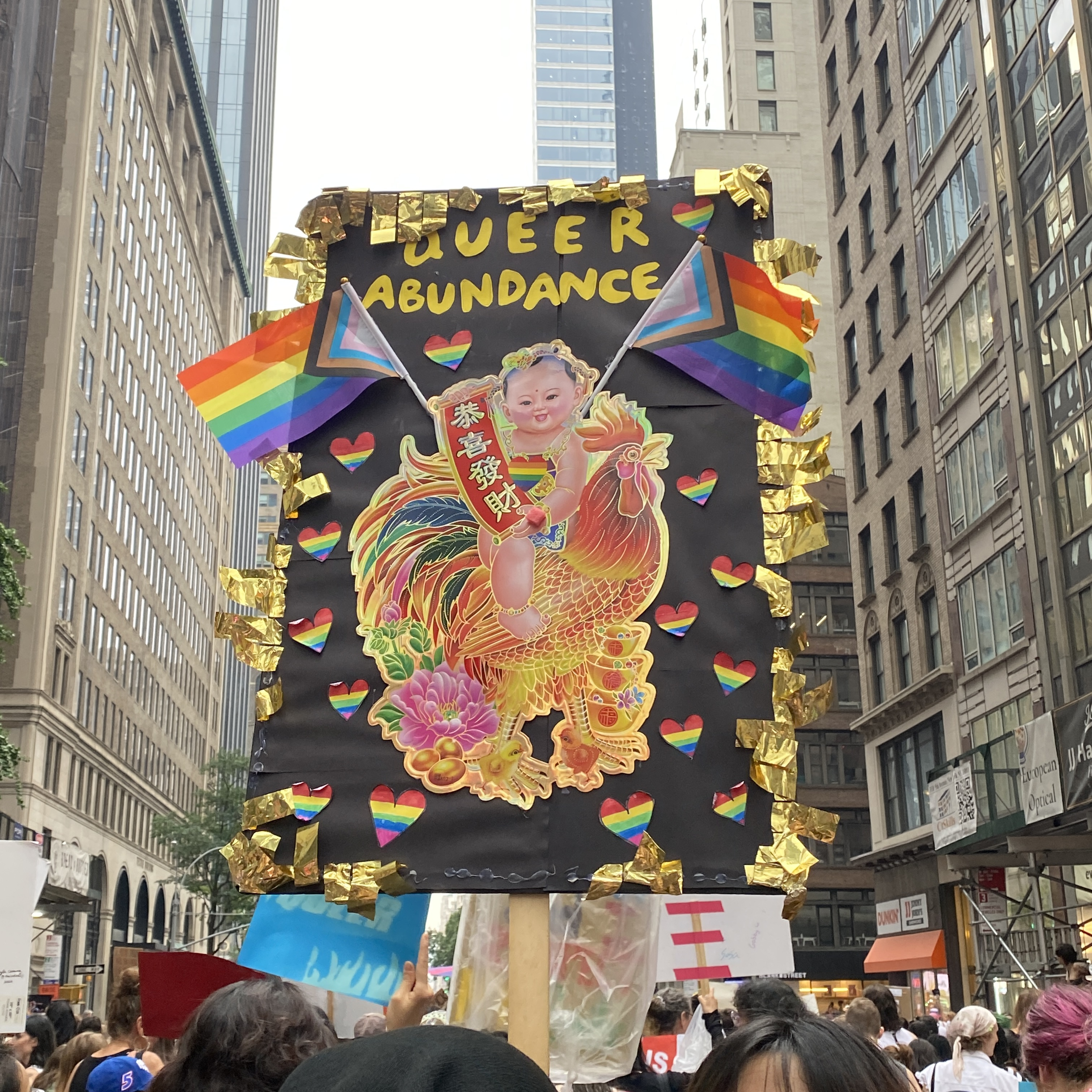
Q-Wave sign at NYC Dyke March 2026

The idea for Q-Wave came about at the Queer Asian Pacific Legacy Conference in March 2004, when the Women's Caucus and the Gay Asian & Pacific Islander Men of New York (GAPIMNY) held a workshop on "Gender and the Queer A/PI Experience." Women saw a need for a group to support queer API women in NYC, and arranged to march together at the NYC Dyke March to spread the word about their new organization. Q-Wave held its first meeting at New York University in July 2004, with nearly 30 women in attendance.

In 2020, Q-Wave transitioned its services to remote platforms and teleservices because of the COVID-19 pandemic.

In 2020, Q-Wave signed onto an open letter by the Asian American Feminist Collective against the creation of an NYPD Stop Asian Hate Task Force, calling instead for cop-free communities.

=== Lunar New For All Parade ===
In 2009, Q-Wave spearheaded the creation of Lunar New Year for All, a coalition of LGBTQ+ Asian and Pacific Islander groups (including Q-Wave, GAPIMNY, Project Reach, and Apicha) working to increase queer Asian representation in annual Lunar New Year parades throughout New York City.

In 2010, Lunar New For All applied to march in Manhattan Chinatown's Lunar New Year Parade. Parade organizers expressed initial interest, then ghosted the coalition. Lunar New For All reached out to local Asian organizations, actresses and journalists, and Christine Quinn, New York City's first openly gay City Council Speaker, to garner support for their inclusion. They issued press releases in Chinese and English, did radio segments, contacted local and national newspapers, and drummed up so much media coverage that they were allowed to march. Lunar New For All became the first queer contingent to participate in the parade. Since then, they have marched in Lunar New Year parades in Flushing, Queens and Sunset Park, Brooklyn. They pass out fliers to recruit new members, and challenge cultural stereotypes and myths, such as the myth that queerness is a Western concept, or that being openly queer is the same as being openly sexual.

In 2015, a box of Q-Wave Costumes and Posters from Lunar New Year for All Parades was donated to the NYU Tamiment Library and Robert F. Wagner Labor Archives. Additional posters were donated in 2018.

== Activity ==
Q-Wave regularly host events such as book swaps, writing groups, community dinners, film screenings, mentorship programs, fundraisers, and picnics. They are a co-host of the annual Color Me Queer, a Pride dance party and fundraiser for queer and trans BIPOC. The group also participates in transnational solidarity efforts, signing onto letters to support Hong Kong's democratic struggles, and co-hosting rallies in support of marriage equality in Taiwan. Q-Wave has an email listserv with 1,000+ members, and sends a monthly newsletter featuring local events and resources.

== See also ==
- Gay Asian & Pacific Islander Men of New York
- SALGA NYC
- Asian American Feminist Collective
- National Queer Asian Pacific Islander Alliance (NQAPIA)
- St. Pat's for All
- Tarab NYC
