= Gay Asian & Pacific Islander Men of New York =

LGBTQ community organization

GAPIMNY
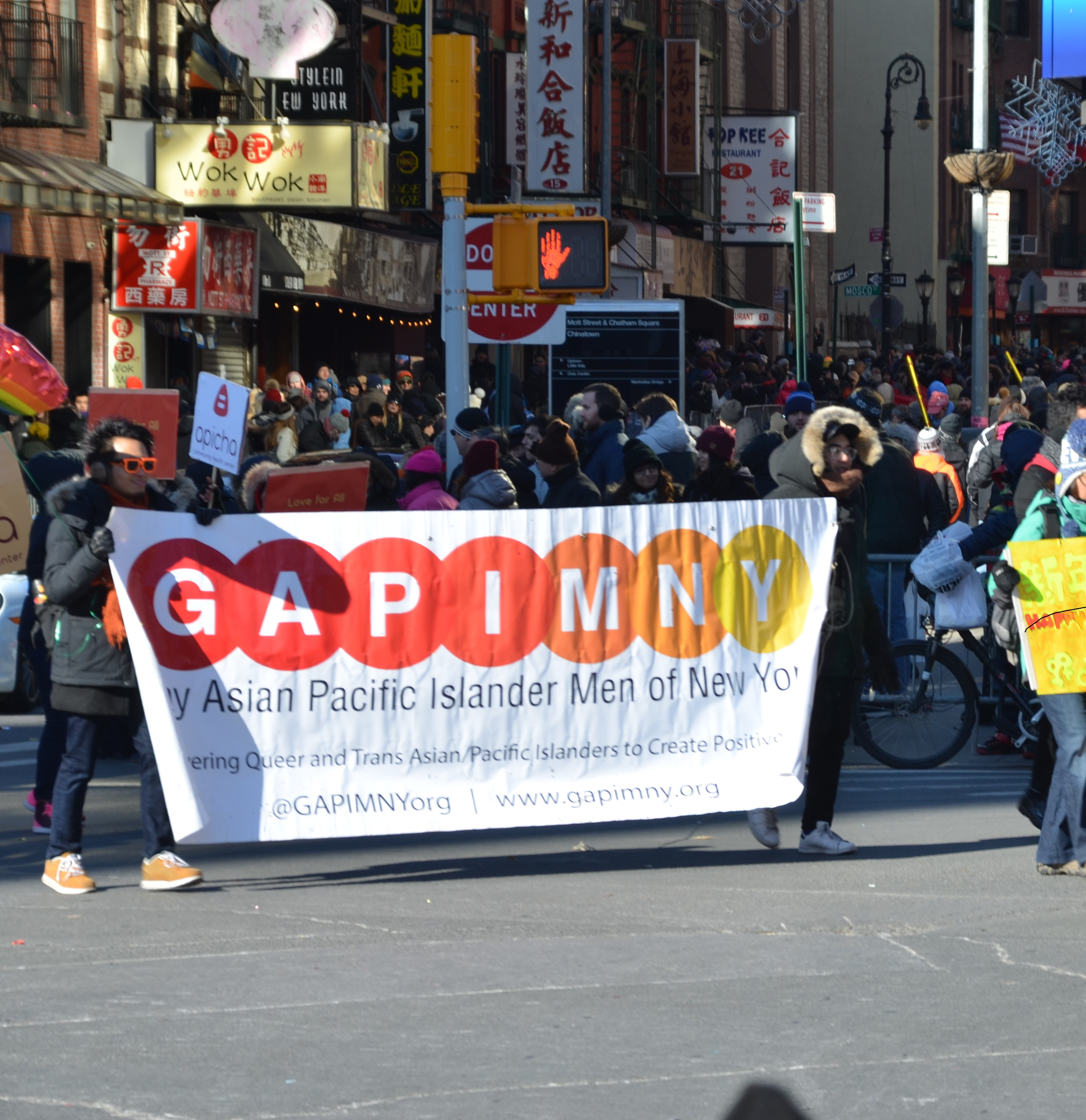
- Members hold a GAPIMNY sign during the 2016 Lunar New Year Parade.
- Founded: 1990
- Founders: Don Kao; John Manzon; Jack T. Brady
- Website: instagram.com/gapimny

GAPIMNY (formerly Gay Asian & Pacific Islander Men of New York) is an all-volunteer-run organization that provides a range of social, educational, and cultural programming for queer and transgender people who are Asian and/or Pacific Islander in the New York City metropolitan area to support each other. The organization's community building efforts is intricately tied to political education and mutual aid.

== History ==
After the retreats in May 1988 and October 1988 that gathered together Asian and Pacific Islander (API) gay men, Don Kao, John Chin, and John Manzon decided to start organizing in New York City. In March 1990, an API-facilitated workshop around racism sponsored by Men of All Colors Together generated interest to start Gay Asian & Pacific Islander Men of New York. The organization made its public debut at the 1990 Lesbian and Gay Heritage of Pride Parade.

In 1991, the leaders of GAPIMNY, alongside the Asian Lesbians of the East Coast (ALOEC), protested against Lambda Legal Defense and Education Fund's and the Lesbian and Gay Community Services Center’s use of Miss Saigon in their fundraisers. The protesters expressed anger over the way Asian men and women were portrayed in Miss Saigon and demanded to be recognized as part of the LGBT community. Yoko Yoshikawa wrote on behalf of The Heat Is On Miss Saigon Coalition that they were outraged by the way that it perpetuated the idea that Asian women were self-erasing and Asian men were contemptible. When Lambda Legal refused to drop the fundraiser, the coalition staged demonstrations on April 6 and 11, 1991. Yoko observed that six men were arrested.

The organization took a few years to establish organizational infrastructure. In 1995, by-laws were put into effect, the first official steering committee meeting took place, and an information phone line was established. In the following years, GAPIMNY hosted workshops on topics related to the community as a way to outreach and raise awareness. In 1996, GAPIMNY established an online presence through leftnet.edu. In the same year the logo of interlocking male symbols within an apple was created. In 1997, organizers created an annual DynasTea Dance, which became a signature event of the organization through 2006. In 2000, the organization established its own web domain with hosting through queernet. It also launched a newsmagazine called PersuAsian that was funded with a grant from the Gill Foundation. GAPIMNY received recognition when it was honored by Manhattan Borough President C. Virginia Fields and City Council member Alan Gerson at "A Celebration of GLBT Pride" in 2002.

=== The Details magazine controversy ===
In 2004, Details magazine published the satirical feature "Gay or Asian?" GAPIMNY, Asian American Journalists Association, and Gay & Lesbian Alliance Against Defamation (GLAAD) criticized the implications. GAPIMNY co-sponsored with Asian Media Watchdog a protest outside the editorial office on April 16. Two hundred people showed up and the editorial and publishing staff of Details met with the activists to listen to the issues and responded by changing the editorial content. Both straight Asian Americans and members of GAPIMNY were present. The co-chair wrote that the negatively racialized and homophobic feature in Details magazine fueled organizing and coalition building among various groups within the API community. API LGBTQ groups were able to articulate the necessity of the representation of not only gay Asian/Asian American men but of all LGBTQ Asian Americans.

=== Organizational collaborations ===
The National Queer Asian Pacific Islander Alliance notes that many accomplishments of LGBTQ AAPI organizations are achieved through many partnerships. GAPIMNY formed with the help of Men of All Colors Together and became politicized through standing with ALOEC over the Miss Saigon controversy.

GAPIMNY partnered with Queens Pride House to host a brunch and Asian CineVision to feature films in 2002, and partnered with Asian American Legal Defense and Education Fund (AALDEF) to sponsor a forum on immigration issues in 2003.

GAPIMNY and the National Gay and Lesbian Task Force co-sponsored the Queer Asian Pacific Legacy Conference in 2004, which was held to help the community network, organize, agitate, educate, and build the capacity of pan-Asian Pacific American LGBT communities. The outcomes of this conference include:

- The formation of Q-Wave, an organization that would specifically provide a forum for transgender folks and women who identify as lesbian, bisexual, or are questioning their sexual or gender identity and are of Asian and/or Pacific Islander descent.
- The formation of the National Queer Asian Pacific Islander Alliance (NQAPIA)
- A study from the National Gay and Lesbian Task Force Policy Institute titled "Asian Pacific American Lesbian, Gay, Bisexual and Transgender People: A Community Portrait," which was based on a survey of the attendees, revealed that:
  - most members of the community experienced racism within the larger LGBT community,
  - most members of the community experienced discrimination and/or harassment based on sexual orientation, race or ethnicity, and gender expression,
  - the top issues that LGBT APA people faced were the challenges of immigration, hate violence/harassment, and the lack of media representation.

In 2010, NQAPIA organized events that brought out members from GAPIMNY, Q-Wave, and South Asian Lesbian and Gay Association (SALGA) in order to show that undocumented LGBT Asians exist and how immigration reform would help address the fear of being forced to leave the country and go back to countries where they are met with hostility or are persecuted for being LGBT. Four immigration stories were highlighted in detail. One showed how the immigration system had made remaining in the United States with legal status so difficult that it kept a bi-national couple apart. One of the immigrants, an Indonesian who chose to stay in the United States despite being denied asylum, said she felt that it was unsafe to return to a country where killing gays was condoned. Two had become undocumented as a result of decisions made by their legal guardians.

Since 2010 Q-Wave, GAPIMNY, and SALGA-NYC have increased their collaborative efforts by co-hosting events such as joint holiday parties where LGBTQ AAPI folks can celebrate and share their diverse cultures. In 2012, with the help of a grant by Asian Women Giving Circle, Q-Wave, GAPIMNY, and SALGA-NYC collaborated on playwriting workshops that allowed the writers to explore their ethnicity, gender, and sexuality, and culminated in a reading of the works. With the help of La MaMa and Second Generation, "The Community Voices: The Next GenderAsian" presented six ten-minute plays.

In 2015, in celebration of its 25th anniversary, GAPIMNY collaborated with the NYU Tamiment Library & Robert F. Wagner Labor Archives to archive the organizations materials and reflect on the organization's history.

In 2018, GAPIMNY drops “Gay Asian Pacific Islander of New York” from its name, an action in solidarity with trans/gender non-conforming Asian Pacific Islanders. Going forward, the organization is formally known as “GAPIMNY” with the tagline “Empowering Queer & Trans Asian Pacific Islanders.”
