= Cecilia Gentili =

American LGBTQ rights activist (1972–2024)

- Born: January 31, 1972; Gálvez, Santa Fe, Argentina
- Died: February 6, 2024 (aged 52); New York City, U.S.
- Occupation: Activist
- Partner: Peter Scotto

Cecilia Gentili (January 31, 1972 – February 6, 2024) was an American advocate for the rights of transgender people and sex workers.

Born and raised in Argentina, she moved to Brazil and finally to the United States, where she held leadership positions at the LGBTQ HIV/AIDS care nonprofits GMHC and Apicha in New York City. She also co-founded a free clinic there for sex workers at the Callen-Lorde Community Health Center, and co-founded DecrimNY, an organization that advocates for decriminalized sex work in New York. Gentili successfully lobbied for the repeal of the "Walking while trans law". In 2019, she founded Trans Equity Consulting.

Gentili later filed a lawsuit challenging the Trump administration's removal of non-discrimination protections for gender identity in the Affordable Care Act.

== Early life ==
Gentili was born on January 31, 1972, and raised as a boy in the Argentinian city of Gálvez, Santa Fe. Her parents were Italian and Argentinian. She was sexually abused by a neighbor throughout her childhood, beginning when she was six years old. She came out as gay at 12 years old, with her mother being more open-minded about her sexuality, while her father and brother struggled to come to terms with it. Gentili's grandmother, an Indigenous woman from the countryside, was "the only person who truly was open to a conversation about gender". Gentili attended Baptist services with her grandmother as a child; however, when the pastor admonished Gentili for wearing earrings one week, they both left the church in protest.

She was regularly attacked, sometimes by the local police who targeted transgender people whom they considered to be wearing clothes belonging to a different gender. The police justified such attacks because “One of the laws there prohibited misleading or being someone that you’re not". Gentili moved to Rosario, a larger city, to attend college. It was there that she met a trans person for the first time and started to identify as a woman. At age 26 she decided to move to the United States in search of a better life.

== Life in the United States ==
After leaving Argentina, Gentili lived in Brazil; she later said that she was banned from Brazil, but never divulged why. She then moved to the United States, first living in Miami, where she had difficulty finding a job due to being undocumented. Within two weeks of arriving in Miami, she was arrested for prostitution and placed in a male jail. She continued to live in Miami for five years, deciding to leave after being assaulted.

When Gentili moved to New York City in 2003, she was both undocumented and a sex worker. In 2009, she was arrested on drug possession charges and imprisoned at Rikers. She was detained by U.S. Immigration and Customs Enforcement but released with an ankle bracelet after being assaulted in both the male and female sections of the detention facility.

After her release, she participated in an addiction recovery program for 17 months. A counselor told her she needed to find something she enjoyed as much as heroin; according to Gentili, "that came to be community and working for my community.”

In 2011, Gentili was granted asylum in the United States and legally changed her name the following year. Gentili became a U.S. citizen in September 2022.

== Activism and community work ==
=== 2010s ===
In 2010, Gentili began an internship at The LGBT Center, where she began working with the NYC Anti-Violence Project. From 2012 until 2016, she was the trans health program coordinator at the Apicha Community Health Center in New York City.

From 2016 to 2019, Gentili was the Director of Policy at the GMHC, an AIDS service organization in New York City and the world's first organization dedicated to HIV/AIDS prevention. While part of the GMHC, she advocated for the Gender Expression Non-Discrimination Act (GENDA), a proposed piece of state legislation which was eventually signed into law in 2019.

In 2019, Gentili co-founded the DecrimNY campaign, which works to decriminalize sex work and successfully lobbied for the repeal of the "Walking while trans law" in New York. This law criminalized "loitering for the purposes of prostitution" and was used to unfairly target, harass, and arrest transgender women of color.

In 2019, she also founded Trans Equity Consulting, a development consulting firm that sought to center trans women of color, immigrants, sex workers, and incarcerated people. With her extensive background in collaborating with organizations such as the AIDS Institution, the Department of Health and Mental Hygiene, Funders for LGBTQ Issues, Borealis Foundation, and Cicatelli Associations Inc., Gentili continued her personal commitment to helping the queer and trans communities. That year, she also joined the Board of Directors of Stonewall Community Foundation, a New York-based, LGBTQ-focused grantmaking organization, where she served until her death.

The services provided by Trans Equity Consulting include workshops and trainings, organizational developments, conference and convening planning, speaking and story telling and conflict medication. Through workshops and trainings, Gentili has trained individuals ranging from government to non-profit and academic settings on subjects such as LGBTQ competency, policy, transgender care, and sex worker issues.

In 2019, Callen-Lorde honored Gentili with their yearly Community Health Award for her contributions to the visibility and health of the LGBTQ+ community, recognizing her leadership and also for her partnership with Callen-Lorde.

=== 2020s ===
In 2020, she hosted Fierce Futures, a fundraiser supporting organizations that aid Black trans people.

In 2020, under the Trump Administration, the Department of Health and Human Services removed provisions in the Affordable Care Act on sex discrimination, which included gender identity. This occurred only a few days before the Supreme Court issued a ruling that protections in the Civil Rights Act on the basis of sex extend to gay and transgender people. In response, Gentili and Tanya Asapansa-Johnson Walker brought a lawsuit against the department with the aid of the Human Rights Campaign and the law firm BakerHostetler, arguing the rule "directly contravenes" the Supreme Court ruling.

In 2021, Gentili was a co-founder of Callen-Lorde Community Health Center's "Cecilia's Occupational Inclusion Network" (COIN) clinic, the first dedicated healthcare center for sex workers on the East Coast.

The COIN Clinic provides their patients with access to various essential services. Some services include primary care, sexual health, behavioral health, dental access, pharmacy and more. They work diligently to provide care not only for those with health insurance but also those who are uninsured. As a result, their mission is to provide those who identify as sex workers free care in a supportive environment.

In January 2022, she was one of several community leaders who sent a letter asking Governor Kathy Hochul to create the Lorena Borjas Trans Equity Fund. The fund was established later that year and provided $3 million to organizations serving transgender people.

In 2022, she was a finalist for The David Prize where she was recognized for her effort to make New York a more inclusive city for transgender and sex worker rights.

In February 2023, she was one of hundreds of New York Times contributors who signed a letter condemning the newspaper's coverage of transgender people.

In October 2023, she was among hundreds arrested at a protest in Grand Central Terminal calling for a ceasefire in Gaza organized by the anti-Zionist organization Jewish Voice for Peace.

== Creative pursuits ==
In 2017, Gentili mounted The Knife Cuts Both Ways, a comedic one-woman show based on light-hearted stories from her life. Also that year, she modeled for American fashion designer Gogo Graham.

Between 2018 and 2021, Gentili appeared as Ms. Orlando in 4 episodes of Pose, a TV drama following people of color amidst the AIDS crisis in 1980's New York City.

She debuted her autobiographical off-Broadway show, Red Ink, loosely based on Faltas in 2023. She had planned to reprise the show in April 2024.

In 2023, she created and co-organized "Transmissions Fest", the first all-trans music festival in NYC, with the proceeds going to LGBTQ+ charities.

=== Memoir ===
After several years of live oral storytelling, Gentili started working on compiling some of her stories into a book. Initially, she struggled because "Telling stories without an audience seemed meaningless to me". Eventually, she decided to structure the memoir as letters written to people who influenced her as a child. In 2022, she released her debut book, Faltas: Letters to Everyone in My Hometown Who Isn't My Rapist, which won a Stonewall Book Award for nonfiction. The title In Spanish, "faltas" means "mistake". Within the memoir Gentili focuses on her experiences of trauma, transphobia, and lack of support in Argentina and the United States. According to Gentili, she wrote the book not as "self-justification", but to explain the experiences of trans youth in the 1970s. The process of writing the memoir also allowed Gentili to stop attending therapy sessions, which she had been for more than ten years.

The memoir consists of eight letters to people who impacted Gentili's life: her abuser's daughter, her father's mistress, a foreign girl she met in her village, two friends from her youth, her grandmother, her mother, and lastly, the midwife who assisted her mother when she gave birth to Gentili. She writes to these people because they treated her either with care or cruelty. She also writes about her abuser, referring to him as just "Miguel". Gentili writes that he started abusing her when she was a small child, and continued through her adolescence until she moved to the United States. He was the only person to see femininity in Gentili when she was a child, and she writes that he took advantage of it. Gentili wrote that she did not report him because he understood her and gave her permission to be herself in a very conservative village.

== Personal life ==
At the time of her death, Gentili split her time between her residences in Marine Park, Brooklyn, and in upstate New York; she had been in a relationship with Peter Scotto since the mid-2010s.

Gentili attended both Baptist and Catholic services during her life but found the experiences traumatic and came to identify as an atheist. In November 2023, she said in an interview that she was exploring her relationship to religion.

== Death and legacy ==
Gentili died at her home in Brooklyn on February 6, 2024, at the age of 52. Tributes to her were posted by GLAAD President and CEO Sarah Kate Ellis, deputy director for Transgender Justice with the ACLU National LGBT & HIV Project's Chase Strangio, New York Governor Kathy Hochul, Callen-Lorde's CEO, Patrick McGovern, New York State Senator Brad Hoylman, and fellow actors on Pose such as Angelica Ross and MJ Rodriguez.

Gentili's funeral was held at St. Patrick's Cathedral on February 15, 2024. The funeral was attended by prominent members of the LGBTQ community in New York City and was covered in Vogue. She was eulogized as “Saint Cecilia, the mother of all whores"; the Archdiocese of New York later condemned the funeral.

After her death The Human Rights Campaign Foundation (HRCF), and the Trans Justice Initiative (TJI) program launched the Cecilia Gentili grant in her honor. The grant is supposed to annually provide support to the Latiné trans communities.

Gentili's cause of death was not publicly disclosed until April 1, 2024, when it was announced that she had died from "the combined effects of heroin, xylazine, cocaine and fentanyl". Criminal charges were brought against Antonio Venti, who had allegedly sold Gentili the drugs, as well as a second man, Michael Kuilan, who had allegedly provided Venti with the drugs.

== Selected works ==
- "9. Employment". Trans bodies, trans selves: a resource for the transgender community. Oxford New York Auckland: Oxford University Press. 2014. ISBN 978-0-19-932535-1.
- "Tango Between Two Worlds". Surviving Transphobia. Jessica Kingsley Publishers. 21 September 2023. pp. 129–137. ISBN 9781787759664.
- Faltas: letters to everyone in my hometown who isn't my rapist. Brooklyn NY: LittlePuss Press. 2022. ISBN 978-1-7367168-2-3.
