= Satellite babies =

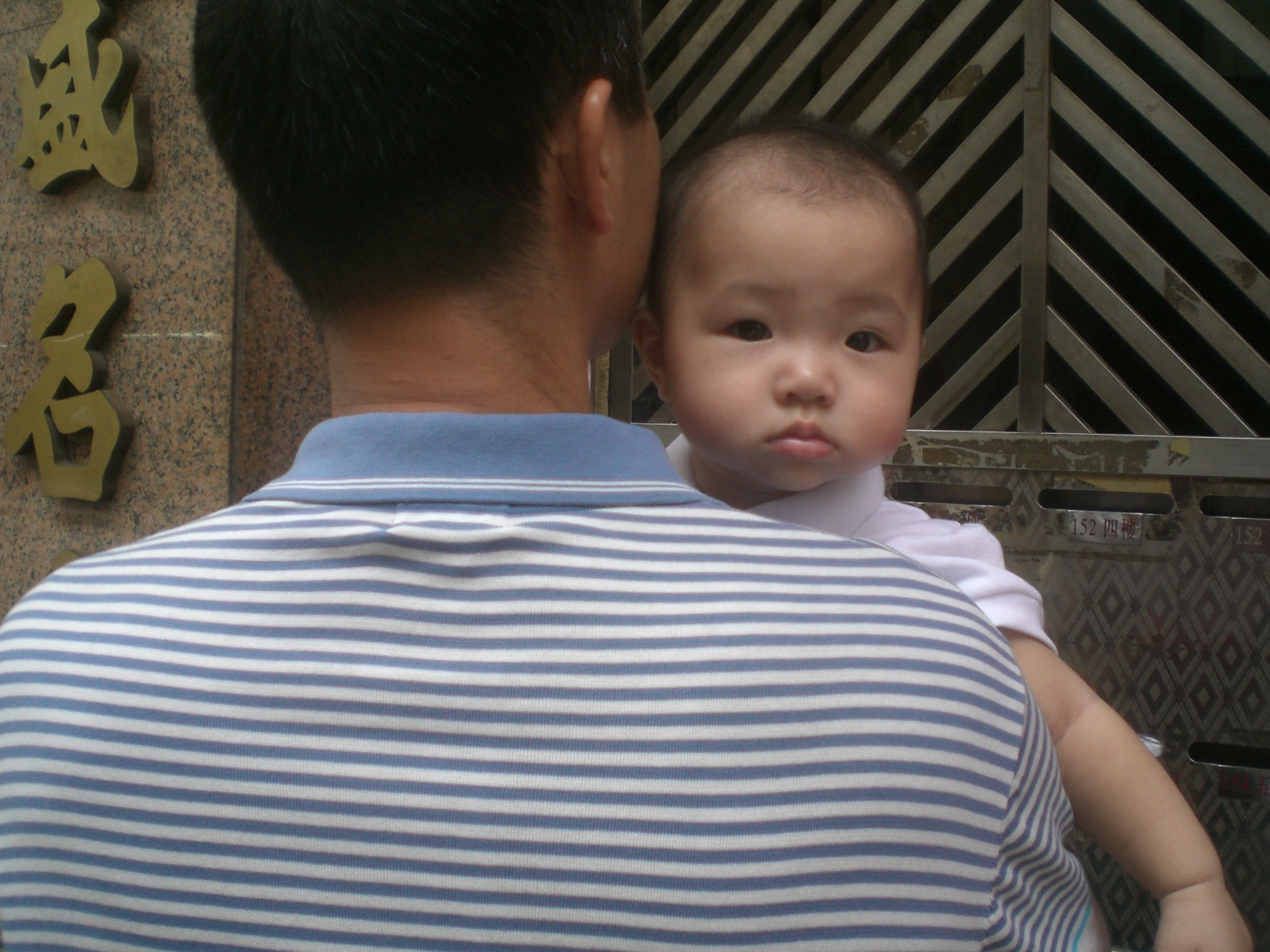
Thousands of US-born babies are sent back to China to be reared by extended family every year.

Satellite babies (also called Satellite children) refer to immigrants’ children who are temporarily sent back to their home country by their parents to be reared by extended family. Typically, the satellite babies are born in the host country and sent back as infants, returning to their parents in time to start schooling or when their parents have established financial stability. Research and media articles on satellite babies have predominantly focused on the topic from a Chinese-American context. Satellite babies have become more prevalent in recent decades due to globalisation, prompting researchers and social workers to raise concerns about the psychological impacts of repeated attachment disruptions and acculturation associated with satellite babies.

== Definition ==
Satellite babies is a term coined in the 2009 research paper Satellite Babies in Transnational Families: A Study of Parents’ Decision to Separate from their Infants. In the paper, the researchers focus on the children of Chinese immigrants in North America. However, the practice also occurs in immigrant households of South Asian, African, and Caribbean origin and occurs in many Western countries, such as Australia. Despite this diversity, research on satellite babies has mainly been conducted on ethnically Chinese children in North America.

Satellite babies should not be confused with parachute kids, which refer to elementary or secondary international students living alone in a foreign country whilst their parents remain in their home country. Furthermore, while satellite babies are quite similar to left-behind children, researchers argue that the two groups are sufficiently different as satellite babies suffer more attachment disruptions, are separated across a vaster geographical distance, and need to adjust to a different culture and language upon reunification.

== History ==
Many societies, including Chinese society, have traditionally endorsed kinship care. In particular, the practice of grandchildren being cared for by grandparents while the parents migrate for work has become widespread within China due to rural-urban migration. As increasing numbers of Chinese people immigrate to Western countries, many choose to continue this practice transnationally.

According to a New York Times article from 1999, 10 to 20 percent of mothers at the New York Chinatown Health Center sent their children back to China, and up to half of all expectant mothers at a nearby clinic stated their intention to do the same. A 2009 study surveying pregnant and postpartum women at prenatal care workshops at a community health centre in New York's Chinatown revealed that 57 percent of respondents intend to send newborns back to China, with 74 percent stating they plan to bring their children back after four years. In 2019, the director of the Chinese-American Planning Council stated that 70 percent of Asian-American children in its school-age childcare program were satellite babies.

== Factors influencing parent decision-making ==
=== Economic factors ===
Surveys of Chinese immigrant mothers in Canada and The United States of America revealed that economic necessity was the predominant factor influencing their decision to send their children back to China. The participants stated that they require time to focus on retraining or developing their careers, and considered their infant children as obstacles or extra stress to those goals. Furthermore, participants also stated they could not afford to work whilst keeping their children with them due to the prohibitive cost of child-care services in North America. The importance of financial stability in parents' decision-making is also demonstrated by the timing of when children rejoin the parental household; children tend to return after parents have bought houses, found stable higher paying jobs, or after moving to an area with good schools, which are believed to be indicators of economic success. However, despite economic necessity being the predominant factor, the practice is also prevalent in middle-class, highly educated Chinese immigrant households.

=== Cultural factors ===
According to surveys, the expectation of kinship care is a major factor influencing parents' decision making. Many Chinese parents chose to send their children to be cared for by extended family because they themselves were raised by their grandparents. Parents were also pressured to send their children back; surveys of former Chinese satellite babies cited that many grandparents enjoyed taking care of their grandchildren as it brought them meaning in retirement and gave them the opportunity to raise a daughter or son that they were not able to have. Another factor influencing Chinese parents' decisions was the wish for their children to be exposed to the culture of the home country so that traditional values and the native language would be preserved.

=== Other contributing factors ===
Additional factors that parents attributed to their decision to send their newborns back include a lack child-rearing experience. Many Chinese mothers of satellite babies stated in interviews that they did not know how to raise a child and would prefer to have their more experienced parents look after their grandchildren.

In addition, the mothers of satellite babies also identified their immigration status an impediment to raising children in the host country. Moreover, immigration laws in the host country that prevent the child's grandparents from visiting for extended periods of time were also a contributing factor to parents' decision to send their children back the home country for child-rearing.

Another factor that contributed to parents' decision to separate from their child was living conditions. Many mothers stated in interviews that living conditions were poor in the host country, and they would prefer that their child grow up in the home country where living conditions were better.

=== Detracting factors ===
However, many mothers of satellite babies stated in interviews that they believed their child would exhibit behavioural problems, pointing to the lack of bonding that would result in disobedience and difficulty disciplining their child, which detracted from their decision to separate from their child. Another detracting factor was concerns about the health of the child; a majority of mothers interviewed believed their child's medical needs would not be better met in the home country, as the healthcare services in the host country are more robust. Furthermore, while some parents believed that the child's grandparents would be better at raising the baby, there was also a fear that grandparents' child-rearing style would spoil the baby and cause bad habits, such as little emperor syndrome. Moreover, many parents expressed a desire for their child to assimilate into the new culture of the host country as soon as possible, including parents who wanted to preserve traditional values. The parents expected that extended stay overseas would result in language and cultural barriers, which would hamper the ability of their children to adapt to the culture of the host country. Despite these fears, many parents of satellite babies reported feeling that they did not have a choice, and must send their children back to their home country out of necessity or for the greater good.

== Impacts ==
=== Impacts on the child ===
The importance of strong attachment between infants and their primary caregiver on child development is well documented; research has shown that attachment disruptions are a predictor of poor mental health, increased crime rates, and relationship quality. Satellite babies suffer at least two major attachment disruptions: the first when they are separated from their mother, and another when they are separated from their family caregiver to be returned to their mother.

Upon reunification with their parents, satellite babies may exhibit a range of both externalising and internalising behaviours that indicate emotional trauma, including oppositional behaviour, separation anxiety, and social isolation. According to interviews with parents, some children exhibit anger and hostility towards their parents for separating them from their grandparents, who were considered primary attachment figures by the children, whereas parents are sometimes considered strangers; other children fear further separation, become clingy towards their parents, and agitated whenever parents are out of sight; others show social withdrawal and depression. These behaviours, which are associated with attachment disruptions, are exacerbated by adjustment difficulties related to starting school and acculturation. Acculturative stress can occur when satellite babies, upon return, are suddenly exposed to vastly different cultural norms and expectations both in school and within society, and required to learn a new language. Some parents of satellite babies also reported that their child had difficulty making friends, which they attribute to adjustment difficulties, including not being able to properly communicate in English and attachment disorders.

Surveys of former satellite babies reveal that many satellite babies experience ambivalence towards their situation. In some cases, the children harbour resentment towards their parents, but understand the logic behind their parents' decisions and acknowledge the economic success that has been achieved through these decisions. Researchers have proposed that this ambivalence could be indicative of former satellite babies' confusion about their identity. The researchers suggest that this confusion arises from satellite babies subscribing to two conflicting cultural models of familial relationships and child-rearing: the Western model of intensive parenting that prioritises the parent-child relationship, and the more collectivist model of an open, expansive family that shares childcare responsibilities that is prevalent in countries such as China.

=== Impacts on mothers ===
In interviews, Canadian-Chinese mothers of satellite babies have displayed symptoms of depression and stress due to the separations. Generally, the respondents expressed a lack of control and resignation about their situation. Many mothers are aware of the possible psychological repercussions of separation on their children, and experience guilt for having to send their children back.

When satellite babies return to their mothers, the mothers feel that they lack confidence in raising their child, due to them not having developed the relevant parenting skills. Furthermore, the loss of the bonding period between the mother and the satellite baby, which hinders the development of mutual trust and understanding, can cause mothers to feel disconnected from their child. These emotions could possibly compound the adverse psychological effects experienced by satellite babies.

== Perspectives towards satellite babies ==
In most cases, voluntary family separations are stigmatised in Western countries. Researchers point out that articles on satellite babies highlighted in the media generally depict parents as uncaring, which can intensify judgement of immigrant families. Some studies suggest that the Western ideal of a nuclear family may cause the more collectivist family model, which is generally subscribed to by mothers who choose to send children back to extended family, to be viewed as somehow deficient. Researchers have suggested that clinicians need to better understand the cultural context behind the phenomenon of satellite babies to better serve the diverse needs of new immigrant families.

According to a study interviewing former satellite babies, around 15% of respondents viewed their separation as a positive experience. These respondents believed it was normal to be raised by extended family, and understood separation to be a good solution to the financial hardships experienced by first-generation immigrant parents. These respondents also appreciated their grandparents' undivided attention, which their parents may not have been able to provide, and the feeling of being part of a strong family community. Former satellite babies who viewed separation as a negative experience suggested that clearer communication and explanation of their parents' decision-making would have better prepared them for the separation.
