= Elaine H. Kim =

American academic in Asian American Studies and community activist

- Born: February 26, 1942 (age 84); New York
- Occupations: Professor Emerita of Asian American and Asian Diaspora Studies in the Department of Ethnic Studies at the University of California Berkeley
- Relatives: Brother is anatomic pathologist and neuro pathologist Ronald C. Kim, Clinical Professor at the University of California Irvine

Academic background
- Education: University of Pennsylvania, Columbia University, UC Berkeley

Academic work
- Main interests: Asian American cultural studies, literature and film, Korean diaspora studies, and Asian and Asian American feminism

Elaine H. Kim is an American writer, editor and professor emerita in Asian American Studies and Ethnic Studies at the University of California, Berkeley. Kim retired from teaching in 2015. Her academic interests and research areas included Asian American cultural studies, art, literature, Asian diaspora studies, and Asian American feminism.

== Academic background ==
Kim received her B.A. in English and American Literature from the University of Pennsylvania, M.A. in English and Comparative Literature from Columbia University, and her Ph.D. in Social Foundations of Education from University of California, Berkeley.

In 1995, Kim received an Honorary Doctorate in Humane Letters from the University of Massachusetts Boston, and in 2004, she received an Honorary Doctorate of Laws from the University of Notre Dame. In 2024, she was awarded an Honorary Doctorate of Letters at Amherst College, and in 2025, she received an Honorary Doctorate of Laws from Harvard University.

== Academic career ==
Elaine Kim was one of the founders of the Asian American Studies Program of Ethnic Studies in 1969 and became a ladder faculty member in 1974. In addition to teaching, Kim served UC Berkeley as a Faculty Assistant to the Chancellor for the Status of Women, Associate Dean of the Graduate Division, and Assistant Dean in the College of Letters and Science.

A pioneering scholar of Asian American Studies, Kim's research areas included Asian American literature, culture, and feminism, and she was often a source for commentary on contemporary issues related to the Asian American community, such as affirmative action, anti-Asian violence, and nativist and anti-immigrant rhetoric. Kim also studied the impact of the 1992 Los Angeles riots and civil disturbances on the Korean American community in light of the purported Korean cultural trait called han. Kim has lectured and presented keynote addresses and papers in many US universities as well as at various conferences and universities in China, Japan, Korea, Taiwan, France, Germany, Italy, and Trinidad. Selected academic publications include:

- Asian American Literature: An Introduction to the Writings and Their Social Context, Philadelphia: Temple University Press, 1982
- East to America: Korean American Life Stories (co-edited with Eui-Young Yu), New York: The New Press, 1996
- Dangerous Women: Gender and Korean Nationalism, Routledge, 1997
- Fresh Talk/Daring Gazes: Issues in Asian American Visual Art, University of California Press, 2003
- Echoes Upon Echoes: New Korean American Writing, Temple University Press, 2003

== Community activism ==
Kim's decades of community activism include founding and leading several Asian American community organizations in the Bay Area. Kim helped start the Korean Community Center (now the Korean Community Center of the East Bay) in 1977. The Korean Community Center of the East Bay provides legal assistance for immigration issues and social services for the elderly.

Kim co-founded Asian Women United of California in 1976. Through her work with AWU, Kim wrote, produced, and directed documentaries about Asian American women such as Labor Women in 2002 and Slaying the Dragon: Reloaded in 2011. Kim was also a co-producer of the 1993 documentary, Sa-I-Gu: From Korean Women's Perspectives, which recounts the 1992 Los Angeles riots and their impact on the Korean American community.

In 1985, Kim secured the initial funding for the Asian Immigrant Women Advocates (AIWA), an Oakland-based organization to serve immigrant women garment and hotel workers.

== Selected awards ==
- Asian Pacific American Heritage Lifetime Achievement Award (City and County of San Francisco), 2012
- Lifetime Achievement Award, Association for Asian American Studies, 2011
- Association for Asian American Studies Book Award in Cultural Studies, 2005
- Hall of Outstanding Women at California, 1995
- Fulbright Fellowship, 1987-1988
