= Gálvez, Santa Fe =

Gálvez
- City
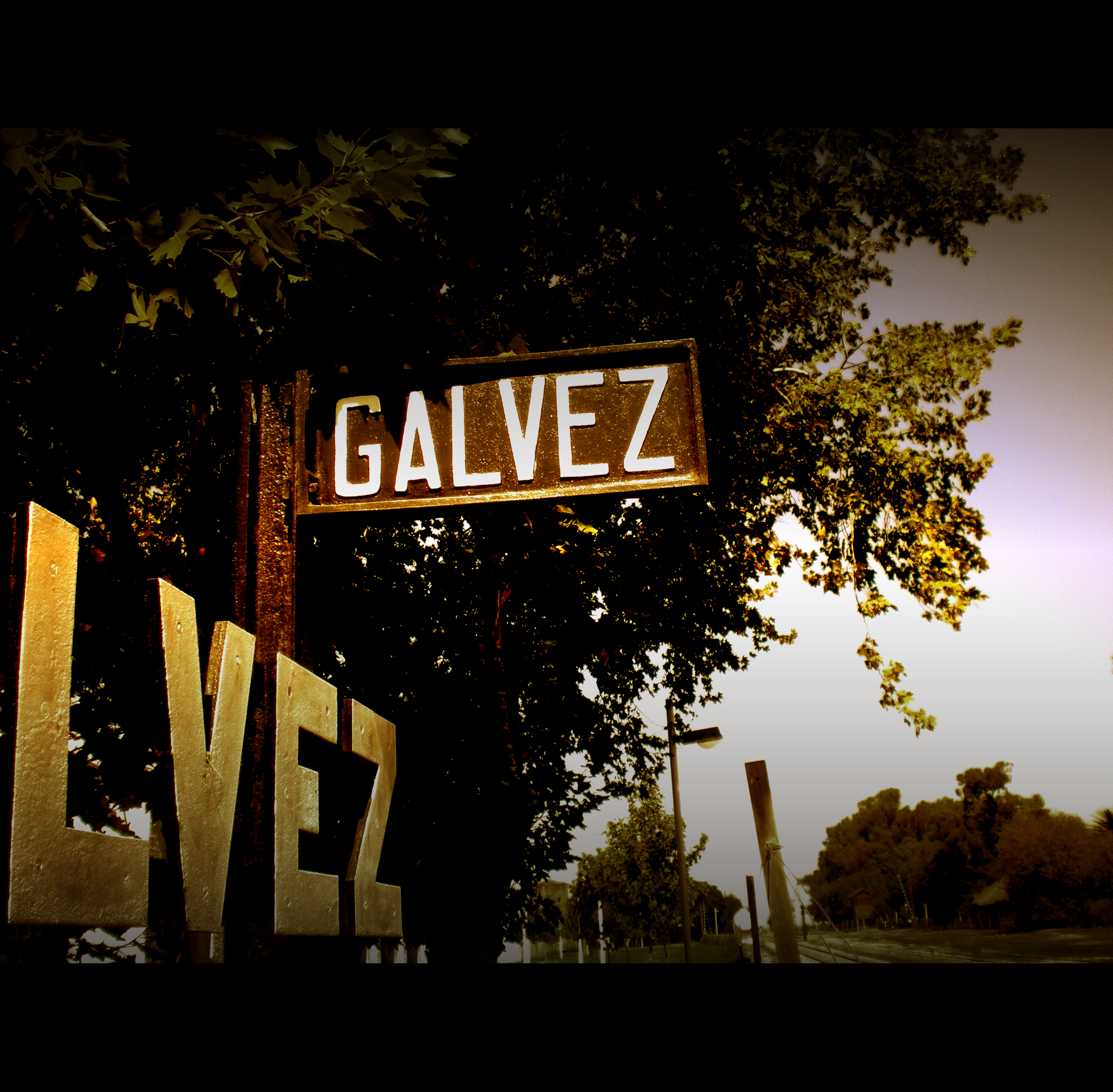
- Gálvez

- Location of Gálvez in Argentina
- Coordinates: 32°2′S 61°13′W
- Country: Argentina
- Province: Santa Fe
- Department: San Jerónimo

Government
  - Intendant: Mariano Busso (UCR)

Area
  - Total: 273 km^{2} (105 sq mi)
- Elevation: 47 m (154 ft)

Population (2001 census)
  - Total: 18,374
  - Density: 67.3/km^{2} (174/sq mi)
- Time zone: UTC−3 (ART)
- CPA base: S2252
- Dialing code: +54 3404

Gálvez is a city in the center of the province of Santa Fe, Argentina, 81 km (50 mi) south of the provincial capital Santa Fe. It has 18,374 inhabitants per the 2001 census [INDEC].

The original settlement was an agricultural colony called Colonia Margarita, in lands belonging to José Gálvez, then governor of the province, who rented it for farming, mainly to Italian immigrants from Piamonte and Lombardia. The official foundation date, 15 October 1886, is that of the opening of the train station, as is usual in many other towns founded in this period in Santa Fe. The communal institutions were formally created on 12 January 1887, and the town became a full municipality on 19 March 1939. The name of governor Gálvez replaced the original one by a decree of 6 June 1889.

The area of Gálvez has a good precipitation regime and produces diverse crops (wheat, corn, soybean, sorghum, sunflower). Cattle are mostly employed for its milk (the central region of Santa Fe is the most important milk-producing area in Argentina). Local industries include the manufacturing of electric engines and transformers, machine tools, furniture, and dairy products.

== Notable people ==
- Roberto Brunetto (born 1955), former Argentine football player
- Cecilia Gentili (1972–2024), Argentine American actress and advocate for the rights of transgender people and sex workers.
