= Roberto Brunetto =

Argentine footballer

Personal information
- Full name: Roberto Antonio Brunetto
- Date of birth: November 7, 1955 (age 70)
- Place of birth: Gálvez, Argentina
- Height: 1.75 m (5 ft 9 in)
- Position: Defender

Senior career*
Years	Team	Apps	(Gls)
1980–1987	Instituto de Córdoba	180	(11)
1987–1991	Oriente Petrolero	128	(6)
1993	The Strongest	18	(0)
1994	Real Santa Cruz	25	(2)
- * Club domestic league appearances and goals as of June 3, 2008

Roberto Antonio Brunetto (born November 7, 1955, in Santa Fe) is a former Argentine football defender who played at club level for Instituto de Córdoba . He also played in Bolivian first division for clubs such as, Oriente Petrolero, The Strongest and Real Santa Cruz.

== Club title ==
Season	Club	Title
1990	Oriente Petrolero	Liga de Fútbol Profesional Boliviano

== See also ==
- Football in Argentina
- List of football clubs in Argentina
