= Asian American feminism =

Asian American feminism encompass a series of evolving sociopolitical movements, theory, and praxis that address the intersections of identities, struggles, and unique experiences of Asian American women and queer people in the broader context of feminism.

Asian American feminism considers the multiplicities of theory, praxis, and locations of women through solidarity with other women of color feminists and transnational feminists within the broader framework of ongoing legacies of colonialism, imperialism, and war. It developed to seek for a space that challenges hetero-patriarchal aspects of Asian America studies and racial marginalization by mainstream white feminisms.

== Background ==
As part of the national reckoning on racial justice inspired by the Civil Rights Movement, college students organized on college campuses for ethnic studies, and eventually Asian American studies, to be established, most notably through the protests of the Third World Liberation Front (TWLF) at San Francisco State University. At the same time, movements like the Combahee River Collective inspired the formation of the Third World Women Alliance, which many Asian American women took part in forming. They came together in solidarity with the shared understanding of being subjects of US imperialism abroad and domestic racism. At the same time, revolutions in China and around the world, Cold War tensions, and the US military campaign in Korea, Vietnam, and other parts of Southeast Asia led to conferences like the 1971 Indochinese Women's Conferences in Vancouver which mobilized Asian American women around the continent and developed a transnational awareness against war and imperialism across the US empire and Asia. Asian American feminists, marginalized by mainstream Asian American studies and white feminism, came together to create spaces for themselves, forming journals, newspapers, and Asian American feminist courses.

Asian American feminists are not homogenous and tend to fall into one of two groups: women's rights support groups and radical activism Women's rights groups tend to focus on specific concerns with the goal of ending sexism and racism and working within existing systems to increase women's representation and involvement at all levels. Participants in radical politics seek to understand larger structures of oppression and how these common structures oppress specific groups differently, and they seek structural change, eliminating barriers based on race, gender, and class, leading to liberation.

=== History of immigration acts ===
Scholars have argued for an alternative historiography to complicate depictions of Asian American history as based solely on racial exclusion, thus overlooking the importance of gender and sexuality and marginalizing the experiences of women and queer people. Asian women were seen as secondary concerns and as offshoots of men's identity, hence their derivative status. The first wave of Asian immigration coincided with westward expansion at a time when femininity was determined by women's ability to perform domestic labor. The Page Act of 1875 excluded contract laborers and "Oriental" women entering the country for "immoral purposes." The law was based on the assumption that all Chinese women entering the US were prostitutes brought to the US to fulfill the sexual needs of male Chinese laborers or to seduce white men, but its main effect was to limit the formation of Chinese American families. The underlying message of the Page Act was that Asian women fail to meet the moral standards of American society. Nineteenth century morality in the US was based on the ability to maintain a two parent nuclear household which was determined by race and class. Most Chinese families lived in multiple family households as they were unable to afford single family units. Views of Chinese families as unassimilable into "proper" family structures justified racial exclusion, therefore Chinese women were considered a threat to the normative family.

The 1882 Chinese Exclusion Act barred Chinese laborers from entering the country, but also had significant impacts on Chinese women and families. Chinese merchants and those who could afford to maintain a middle-class nuclear family were not seen as threatening to the "proper" family structure and allowed to immigrate to the US. Therefore, Chinese women were allowed to immigrate as long as they could uphold the middle-class values of a male breadwinner and a female homemaker. Based on the assumption that all Chinese women immigrating to the US were prostitutes, women faced lengthy interrogations upon their arrival to Angel Island. The popular image of immigrants as threats was conflated with themes of epidemic outbreaks, immigrant bodies were seen as contaminants and carriers of disease.

The 1907 Gentlemen's Agreement allowed female migrants to join their husbands in the US as long as they could prove they would be housewives, not laborers. This led to "picture brides," where Japanese bachelors in the US would bring their prospective brides from Japan through arranged marriages, often exchanging photographs. Once again, the Gentleman's Agreement enforced the nuclear family structure and women's economic dependence on men. Women's immigration status depended on their ability to perform the role of the "good wife."

The War Brides Act of 1945 allowed members of the military to bring Asian women back to the US as wives. Racial inclusion of Asian Americans was dependent on the ability to uphold feminine ideals of maternalism. The Immigration and Nationality Act of 1965 allowed reunification of the immediate family—parents, children under 21, and spouses—reproducing the heteronormative middle-class nuclear family structure. Through the family reunification act many war brides were able to sponsor their families. Heteronormative family structures, enforced through immigration laws, in turn, reinforced gender inequality and placed "alien spouses," mostly women, in a dependent relationship with their spouses.

=== Legacies of war and colonialism ===
Asian American feminism has roots in Third World feminism, which emerged in the 1960s and 1970s, building upon decolonization, women's movements and movements for racial equality, and sought to create a US movement of Women of Color that transgressed nations and ethnicity. Movements critiqued South African apartheid and US imperialism, supporting armed resistance in Honduras, El Salvador, Chile, Grenada, Beirut and the Philippines. The anti-war movement played a critical role in critiques of US imperialism and militarism. Women in socialist Asia became symbols of revolutionary struggle, and served as inspiration due to their political heroism. The 1971 Indochinese Women's Conference (IWC) gave US and Canadian women to meet six women from Southeast Asia fighting US imperialism.

Asian American feminists also contributed to the Third World Women's Alliance (TWWA) which was born out of SNCC (Student Nonviolent Coordinating Committee), and became an independent organization in 1970 under the name Black Women's Alliance, becoming the TWWA in 1971 after a group of Puerto Rican women asked to join. Founded on ideas of solidarity between those impacted by US imperialism abroad and those impacted by state violence domestically, the organization sought to highlight the connections between US imperialism and military interventions abroad and the exploitation and violence women of color faced in the US. Their publication Triple Jeopardy, refers to the intersection of race, class, and gender. TWWA was one of the first organizations committed to intersectionality based on unity through difference, or understanding the ways hierarchies and structures of oppression impact racialized groups differently. Triple Jeopardy depicted Chinese and Vietnamese women living under Communism as revolutionary, serving as inspiration for a socialist, anti-colonial revolution in the US. However, this has been critiqued for what is called "radical orientalism" which idealized and romanticized Asia as an alternative to imperialism and capitalism, while still maintaining the separation between East and West. Additionally, TWWA lacked an analysis of how people of color in the US are complicit in upholding imperialism and benefit from the exploitation of the "Third World." Co-founder Frances Beal, when talking about the origins of TWWA, emphasizes the importance of understanding how racialized state violence, for example the forced sterilization of Puerto Rican and Black women, is connected to US imperialism, while refusing uniformity. In other words, understanding how common structures impact certain people differently, and resist equating the struggles of different groups.

== Contributions to theory ==
=== Cultural studies ===
In cultural studies, Asian American feminist scholars have developed theoretical contributions to the literature stating that gender and race cannot be excluded when analyzing the material conditions that lead to social domination. Lisa Lowe, a prominent scholar in Asian American cultural politics/studies, examines the contradictory position of Asian American immigrants through historical and literary analysis, building upon the works of Stuart Hall and Raymond Williams from the Center for Contemporary Cultural Studies. Lowe shows how Asian immigrants were marked as unassimilable and 'foreign,' to justify racialized labor exploitation in her foundational work, Immigrant Acts: On Asian American Cultural Politics. In The Intimacies of Four Continents, Lowe connects the figure of the Chinese coolie to the African slave in making an intimate network between empire and slavery. She argues that racialized labor across continents has been foundational to the development of modern capitalism and liberalism. Grace Kyungwon Hong ties gender into racial capitalism by uncovering how capitalism invaded the domestic sphere through bureaucratic surveillance. Through labor bureaucracy, American identity was restructured around a normative white idea of consumerism and family. Switching from history to the modern digital age Lisa Nakamura, in Digitizing Race: Visual Cultures of the Internet, demonstrated how racial identities are constructed, represented, and performed in digital spaces. She argues that the internet is not a neutral, deracialized space; certain raced bodies become hyper-visible whereas others are invisibilized. Further, her work explores the global outsourcing of tech work and the underlying racial hierarchies within the digital economy.

=== Postcolonial and transnational frameworks ===
The postcolonial and transnational feminist theorist Chandra Tapalde Mohanty and her foundational work, "Under Western Eyes: Feminist Scholarship and Colonial Discourses," criticizes western feminist's tendencies to homogenize third world women into a singular, oppressed group while also promoting the white savior rhetoric by positioning western feminists as the savior to these third world women.

=== Radical feminism vs Liberal feminism ===
Asian American feminists do not agree on a set path to Asian American liberation. While radical Asian American feminists saw decolonization and socialist movements–and thus saw political role models in socialist Asian women–as paths to liberation, liberal feminists, like Patsy Mink, worked within U.S. institutions, advocating for policies that sought equity through inclusion. Radical Asian American feminists, like Jean Quan, felt fundamentally alienated from America and its electoral process, and Asian American liberalism faced criticism from scholars like Haunani-Kay Trask, Candace Fujikane, and Jonathan Okamura, for maintaining and reproducing Asian American settler colonialism that led to the disenfranchisement of Native Hawaiʻians.

=== Women of color politics, coalition, and solidarity building with other communities ===
Women of color politics refers to the coalition of women of color on the basis that women of color face both racism and sexism. In other contexts, it has been referred to as the various ways people resist "legacies of power," or the oppressive structures that define our lives, not only in politics but in everyday life. Women of Color politics references the violence at the intersection of race and gender, referred to as intersectionality, while also refusing the separation of race and gender in shaping the everyday experiences of women of color. Women of color feminists critique mainstream liberal feminists for failing to recognize the intersections of race and gender. Another key concept of women of color feminisms is the rejection of "politics" being limited to areas of law, policy, or organizing, instead everyday life experiences define politics. Asian American feminists also emphasize the importance of learning from Indigenous, Black, Chicanx, and Latinx feminist theories. They acknowledge the ways racialization has differently impacted groups othered as "foreign."

== Asian American feminist activism and activist organizations ==
Asian American feminism activism is rooted in solidarity between cross-racial groups against white supremacy and U.S. imperialism. Women of Color coalition-building centers intersectionality of race and gender in structuring the various forms of violence they face. Asian American feminism emerges from that coalitional process, centering the specific racialized gendered oppressions facing Asian American women and their communities. Activism in Asian American feminism comes from this foundation to act in shared resistance, also known as solidarity.

=== Key figures ===
==== Grace Lee Boggs ====
Grace Lee Boggs was a prominent Asian activist in the Black Power movement whose gendering and racialization of being a female Chinese American marked her early realization of the need for fundamental changes. Lee Boggs spent much of her political life engaged in place-based activism through grassroots African American organizing in Detroit alongside her husband James Boggs. Her Asian American specific activism is a small section at the end of her political life, and she didn't consider herself a leader within the Asian American movement. However, Lee Boggs was doing the solidarity work of Asian American feminism "decades before civil-right, antiwar, and feminists activists redefined US culture and politics".

=== Organizations ===
==== National Asian Pacific American Women's Forum (NAPAWF) ====
NAPAWF's advocacy began when AAPI women noticed at the UN Fourth World Conference on Women in Beijing, there were no organized voices for AAPI women. Many then gathered in Los Angeles in 1996 and established the NAPAWF. NAPAWF advocates for six key issues: health, civil rights, economic justice, educational access, ending violence against women, and immigration and refugee rights.

NAPAWF remains active in recent years in its organizing works. NAPAWF held vigils to respond to the 2021 Atlanta Spa shooting. In 2023, NAPAWF launched the AAPI Gender Justice Collaborative by partnering up with eight other organizations to call for advancements in intersectional (race, class, gender, and other social identities that could be intertwined and further the systematic oppression one may face) reproductive justice for AAPI women and girls. The organizations worked together and developed an AAPI reproductive justice agenda that talks about demands for justice and AAPI experiences in the U.S. using a framework that prioritizes the human right to make informed decisions about one's body and reproduction, and the right to parent children with support in a safe environment.

==== Asian American Feminist Collective (AAFC) ====
Asian American Feminist Collective is an organization inspired by the Combahee River Collective, a Black feminist lesbian socialist organization that was active from 1974-1980. AAFC was started after the Women's March in 2017 when a group of women felt that women of color were still being excluded and tokenized in the larger feminist community. The AAFC's engagement in activism falls under the larger framework of Asian American Abolitionist Feminism, where it seeks to find solutions beyond policing and carceration in the nation-state and focuses on systematic gendered and racial injustice in the larger and interconnected history of marginalized communities.

The AAFC uses creative feminist medians, such as zines and poetry, to amplify intersectional experiences of Asian American women and to emphasize collective solidarity building. The AAFC's objective is working to dismantle systems of capitalism, racism, and patriarchy by providing channels for community building, and political education. The AAFC is active today for creative events that respond to contemporary events and issues.

The AAFC's recent engagements in activism explores feminist digital-making through initiating the digital zine "Asian American Feminist Antibodies: Care in the Time of Coronavirus" and organizing a community Tweetchat titled #FeministAntibodies. The zine was aimed to archive and collect Asian American feminist political mobilization through community care during the COVID-19 pandemic. The Tweetchat highlights individual experiences faced by individuals under multiple marginalized identities in an attempt to showcase the diversity in struggles and needs within the Asian American community beyond mainstream media portrayal of violence against Asian Americans.

== Arts and literature ==
=== Asian American feminist art ===
The Asian American art movement formed in conjunction with the emergence of ethnic study in the 1970s and 1980s. Asian American art often explores, questions, and interrogates identity. Scholars have questioned the use of the term Asian American art or Asian American art history for its limitations in categorization, instead focusing on diaspora, which refers to transnational movement and displaced populations. Florence Wong and Betty Kano formed The Asian American Women Artists Association (AAWAA) after the Women's Caucus of the Arts in San Francisco, where they noticed a lack of Asian American women artists. The association aims to promote Asian American culture and history through women's perspectives.

East Coast Asian American Art Project (ECAAAP) is part of New York University's Asian/Pacific/American Institute (A/P/A). As a project for NYU's A/P/A, the Virtual Asian American Arts Museum (VAAM), a digital museum, brings together interactive images, videos, audio files, and peer-reviewed texts to create an accessible platform for learning about Asian American art.

The work of Ananya Dance Theatre (ADT) emerges from women of color feminism, which emphasizes understanding and connecting through difference. ADT uses "traditional" Indian dance to subvert nationalism and interrogate differences defined by the nation-state.

== Critiques ==
=== Decolonial framework and Pacific Islanders and Native Hawaiʻian women ===
Native Hawaiʻian scholars Stephanie Nohelani Teves and Maile Arvin have critiqued the inclusion of Pacific Islanders in the broadly used term AAPI (Asian American Pacific Islanders.) They argue that by grouping Pacific Islanders into the broad, heterogeneous category of Asian Americans, the term AAPI harms Pacific Islanders by erasing their indigeneity. As imperialism spread in the Pacific, Enlightenment-era Europeans differentiated themselves from the "other" based on emerging notions of race, nationality, gender and proper sexuality. Early European depictions of the Pacific sexualized men and women; colonized women needed protection from colonized men, justifying European conquest. Pacific Islanders were depicted as lacking civilization, justifying the dispossession of Indigenous lands, settler colonialism, and the exploitation of Indigenous peoples.

Settler colonialism refers to the dispossession and displacement of Indigenous peoples and the settler society that replaces the Indigenous population. An example of this is the representation of Native Hawaiʻians welcoming to justify the settlers' presence. In Aloha America: Hula Circuits through the US Empire, Imada described the process of colonialism and representations of Hawaiʻians and the commodification of Haiwaii through the tourism industry. After the Spanish-American War in 1898, the US occupied Hawaiʻi, Guam, Puerto Rico, Cuba, Samoa, and the Philippines. The US overthrew the Kingdom of Hawaiʻi in 1898, it became an incorporated territory in 1900 and became a state in 1959. As the only US territory to become a state, Hawaiʻi was distinct because there had been a white ruling class and American capital investments since 1820. The original American settlers of Hawaiʻi dominated both politics and the economy, taking land and power from Indigenous peoples, their descendants overthrew the Kingdom of Hawaiʻi and controlled the economy through large corporate trusts. Imada and others have argued that the colonial relationship between Hawaiʻi and the US was facilitated by hula. Live hula performances became popular through live hula circuits that toured the US and created a false sense of reciprocity between Hawaiʻi and America. Hula dancers became embodiments of Hawaiʻi as a space welcoming to Americans. This crafted an image of Hawaiʻi as a space open to military and political intervention.

=== Decolonial framework and Peminism ===
Peminism refers to Filipina feminists, the P specifically signifies Pinay or Pilipina as in American-born Filipinas. Peminisim signifies a specifically Filipina American experience and the struggle for decolonization, consciousness, and liberation. In Pinay Power: Peminist Critical Theory Melinda L. de Jesús distinguishes Peminism from Asian American Feminism as "the gendered analysis of imperial trauma" as the Philippines was colonized by both Spain and the US. A key characteristic of Peminism is the exploitation of Filipina labor, which is both gendered and racialized. The Filipina migrant worker is often used interchangeably with the figure of "the trafficked woman." In this context, trafficking refers to all forms coercive and exploitative labor conditions. Transnational feminist scholars have critiqued western feminists for characterizing "trafficked women" as victims, lacking agency and in need of rescue.

=== Model minoritization ===
Various scholars have critiqued the assumptions that underlie the model minority myth from an Asian American feminist perspective. The "model minority myth" refers to the misleading racial stereotype of Asian Americans as a class defined by the high value they place on education professional success and upward mobility, values which are assumed to come from ethnic culture as opposed to class resources and the pressures to succeed as immigrants. The stereotype also includes depictions of Asian Americans as politically uninvolved and submissive to authority. For Asian American women, the convergence of racial and gender stereotypes contributes to objectification and hypersexualization.

As Shireen Roshanravan argues, the model minoritization of Asian Americans is associated with whiteness, as the construction of Asian Americans as the model minority is based on the construction of Black people as lacking the discipline to achieve socio-economic mobility, making Asian Americans complicit in white supremacy. Building on Edouard Glissant's concept of "root identity" in Poetics of Relation, Asian American scholars have applied root identity to the reduction of Asian American identity as linear descent from an imagined mythic origin as a "site of authentic and pure Asianness." Homi Bhabha, a postcolonial scholar, uses the term "third space" to refer to the in-between space of the colonizer and colonized, deconstructing Oriental binaries of East and West. Gloria Anzaldúa defines the "racial third space" as bodies that evade the state's racial binaries. Claire Jean Kim uses the concept of "racial triangulation" to refer to Asian American bodies that fall outside of the racial binary of Black/white, with Blackness as a symbol of nonwhitness and racial degradation. For Asian Americans the Black/white binary and model minority myth reinforces anti-Blackness as a strategy for achieving belonging in the US.
