= Lisa Lowe =

U.S. professor

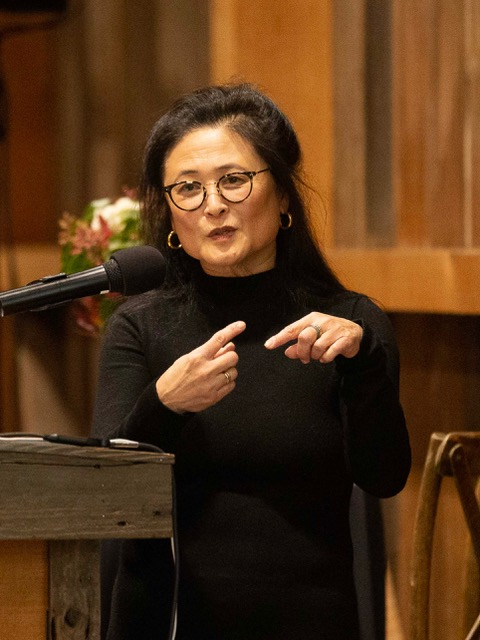

Academic background
- Education: Stanford University (BA); University of California, Santa Cruz (PhD)

Academic work
- Discipline: Comparative literature
- Institutions: University of California, San Diego; Tufts University; Yale University
- Notable works: Critical Terrains: French and British Orientalisms; Immigrant Acts: On Asian American Cultural Politics; The Intimacies of Four Continents
- Website: https://americanstudies.yale.edu/people/lisa-lowe

Lisa Lowe is an American scholar of literature and cultural history. She is the Samuel Knight Professor of American Studies at Yale University, and affiliate faculty member of programs in Ethnicity, Race, and Migration and Women's, Gender, and Sexuality Studies. Prior to Yale, she taught at the University of California, San Diego and Tufts University. As an interdisciplinary scholar, Lowe began her work in French and comparative literature. Since then, her work has focused on the cultural politics of colonialism, immigration, and globalization. She is known for her scholarship on French, British, and American colonialism, Asian migration and Asian American studies, race and liberalism, and comparative empires.

== Career ==
Lowe studied European intellectual history at Stanford University, and French literature and critical theory at University of California, Santa Cruz. She is the recipient of awards and fellowships from the Guggenheim, Rockefeller, and Mellon Foundations, the UC Humanities Research Institute, and the American Council of Learned Societies. In 2011–12, she was a University of California President's Faculty Research Fellow, and the Visiting Fellow at the School of Advanced Study, University of London. In the Fall 2012, she was the F. Ross Johnson-Connaught Distinguished Visitor at the Munk School of Global Affairs at the University of Toronto. In 2018, the American Studies Association awarded her the Carl Bode - Norman Holmes Pearson Award for lifetime contributions to the field, and the Richard A. Yarborough Prize for outstanding mentoring of underrepresented scholars. In 2022-2024, she was an Affiliate Scholar at the Boston Psychoanalytic Society and Institute. She was inducted into the American Academy of Arts & Sciences in 2026.

== Work ==
She has authored books on orientalism, immigration, colonialism, and globalization. Her first book Critical Terrains: French and British Orientalisms (1991), examined culture, class, and sexuality in French and Anglo-American literature, letters, and theory from Lady Mary Wortley Montagu and Montesquieu to Julia Kristeva and Roland Barthes.

Her second book, Immigrant Acts: On Asian American Cultural Politics (1996), analyzed the contradictions of Asian immigration to the United States, observing that Asian immigrants have been included in the workplaces and markets of the U.S., yet through exclusion laws and bars from citizenship, are distanced from national culture and constructed as perpetual immigrants or "foreigners-within." In it, Lowe argues that Asian immigration to the United States is crucial for understanding the racialized nature of U.S. citizenship, racial capitalism, and the rise of U.S. overseas empire. It received the 1997 Book Award in Cultural Studies from the Association for Asian American Studies, and has been frequently cited as a central text in Asian American studies. In 2026, scholars at a UCLA conference discussed the book's legacy on its thirty year anniversary.

Her third monograph, The Intimacies of Four Continents (2015), is a study of settler colonialism, transatlantic African slavery, and the East Indies and China trades in goods and people as the conditions for modern European liberalism and empire. This work inspired a round table discussion at the 2015 annual meeting of the American Studies Association, where an interdisciplinary panel of scholars discussed the influence of the book on their approaches to the humanities. In 2016, The Intimacies of Four Continents was named Finalist for the John Hope Franklin Award from the American Studies Association, and in 2018, it received the Nicolás Guillén Outstanding Book Award from the Caribbean Philosophical Association.

Lowe is co-editor, with David Lloyd, of the volume The Politics of Culture in the Shadow of Capital (1997), and with Elaine H. Kim, "New Formations, New Questions: Asian American Studies" (1997) a special issue of Positions: East Asia Cultures Critique. Since 2001, Lowe has been co-editing, Perverse Modernities, a book series with Jack Halberstam published by Duke University Press.

== Selected publications ==
=== Books ===
- 1991: Critical Terrains: French and British Orientalisms. Cornell University Press
- 1996: Immigrant Acts: On Asian American Cultural Politics. Duke University Press
- 1997: (edited with David Lloyd). The Politics of Culture in the Shadow of Capital. Duke University Press
- 2015: The Intimacies of Four Continents. Duke University Press

=== Selected journal articles and book chapters ===
- "Work, Immigration, Gender: New Subjects of Cultural Politics." Social Justice 25: 3 (Fall 1998)
- "Utopia and Modernity: Some Observations from the Border." Rethinking Marxism 13/2 (Spring 2001): 10-18
- "Immigrant Literatures: A Modern Structure of Feeling." In D. Marçais et al., eds., Literature on the Move: Comparing Diasporic Ethnicities in Europe and the Americas. Carl Winter, 2002
- "The International within the National." In R. Weigman and D. Pease, eds, The Futures of American Studies, Duke University Press, 2003
- "Insufficient Difference," Ethnicities 4: 3 (2005): 409-414
- "The Intimacies of Four Continents." In A. L. Stoler, ed., Haunted by Empire: Geographies of Intimacy in North American History'. Duke University Press, 2006
- "The Gender of Sovereignty." The Scholar and the Feminist. Volume 6.3, Summer 2008
- "Autobiography Out of Empire." Small Axe 28, Volume 13, 2009, No. 1, 98–111
- "Reckoning Nation and Empire." In J. C. Rowe, ed., Blackwell Companion to American Studies, Blackwell, 2010
- "History Hesitant." Social Text 125, Vol. 33, No. 4, December 2015, 85-107
- "Transpacific Entanglements." With Y. L. Espiritu and L. Yoneyama. In C. Schlund-Vials, ed., Flashpoints for Asian American Studies. Fordham University Press, 2017
- "Metaphors of Globalization and Dilemmas of Excess." In H. Yapp and C. R. Snorton, eds., Saturation: Race, Art, and the Circulation of Value. New Museum and MIT Press, 2020
- "Globalization." In B. Burgett and G. Hendler, eds., Keywords for American Cultural Studies. Third Edition. New York University Press, 2020
- "Revolutionary Feminisms in a Time of Monsters." In B. Bhandar and R. Ziadah, eds. Revolutionary Feminisms. Verso Books, 2020

=== Selected podcast or webinar presentations ===
- "Migration, Materiality, Memory." The Power Institute, University of Sydney, October 2020
- "In Conversation with Lisa Lowe." Luke de Noronha, Sarah Parker Remond Centre, University of London, July 2021
