= SALGA NYC =

SALGA NYC (South Asian Lesbian and Gay Association of New York City) is a non-profit, all-volunteer organization dedicated to improving the awareness and acceptance of LGBTQ people of South Asian origin in the New York City metropolitan area. The organization concentrates on providing cultural visibility for community members and opposing oppression and discrimination in the LGBTQ, South Asian, and intersectional communities. This includes leadership development, multi-generational support, immigration advocacy, mental health and HIV/AIDS activism, and political involvement.

== History ==
SALGA NYC was founded in 1991, with the name replacing an earlier version of the group, the South Asian Gay Association (SAGA).

In 1995, SALGA NYC was awarded the Community Service Award from the National Gay and Lesbian Task Force and the Community Leadership Award from Queens Pride, Inc. in 2015.

== Programming ==
SALGA NYC's primary concerns are of providing support and visibility to a marginalized community. It has continually hosted a monthly peer support group since 1991 for those who self-identify as queer and South Asian, alongside community activities such as drag brunches, book readings, and cultural programming including holiday celebrations (for occasions such as Holi and Ramadan). They have also participated in Pride parades.

In addition to this regular program of events, SALGA NYC hosts informal community events and collaborates with similarly oriented community organizations in the NYC area. Past collaborations include health workshops with Apicha Community Health Center; the annual Color Me Queer post-pride party held with the Audre Lorde Project, Q-Wave, and other LGBTQ People of Color community groups; and organizing with other South Asian groups such as Sakhi for South Asian Women and the South Asian Women's Creative Collective.

SALGA has also created a space for LGBTQ South Asian youth through its Youth Group. Members within SALGA formed a Book Club, which has hosted authors such as Ruth Vanita, Rakesh Satyal, and Vivek Shraya. SALGA also a regular dance team which performs in many venues including New York City Pride March, the Queens Museum, and Flushing Town Hall.

== India Day Parade ==
The group has gained media attention over its fight to participate in the annual India Day Parade in New York City, hosted by the Federation of Indian Associations. After marching in 1992, they were denied the right to march in the parade from 1993 to 1997. SALGA held protests to counter the repeated rejections, including being invited to march under the Sakhi banner. In 1997, they founded the South Asian Progressive Task Force to coordinate protests. SALGA was permitted to participate in the march in 2000, after which the FIA once again started to reject the organization's applications. SALGA again won the right to march in the India Day Parade in 2010.
