= Asian American Feminist Collective =

Asian American Feminist organisation

The Asian American Feminist Collective (AAFC) was founded in 2018 and is a group of scholars, organizers, and writers that seeks to engage in intersectional feminist politics grounded within communities that include East, Southeast, and South Asian, Pacific Islander, multi-ethnic and diasporic Asian identities. The AAFC aims to create spaces for identity exploration, political education, community building, and advocacy through the events, workshops, and resources that they provide. The AAFC has attributed their ability to think and act critically in community activism to the work of Black feminist thought and feminist movements in developing nations.

Since 2018, the AAFC has published three zines: Building an Asian American Feminist Movement, How to Make History, and Care in the Time of Coronavirus. Common themes in their zines have included dissecting privilege and access, among other social issues.

== History ==
In their zine Building an Asian American Feminist Movement, the Collective states, "In the groundswell of feminist resistance that launched the Women’s March and Strike in January 2017, we have yet again seen the exclusion and tokenization of women of color." The inaugural members of AAFC found it crucial that they help rekindle Asian American feminism and activism to insure the inclusion and representation of the needs of Asian American women, girls, and marginalized genders when it came to political resistance. In early 2017, they created an Asian American Feminism event series before launching the AAFC in September 2018.

== Current Leadership ==
- Salonee Bhaman
- Julie Ae Kim
- Rachel Kuo
- Senti Sojwal
- Tiffany Diane Tso
