= Project Reach NYC =

Non-profit organization in New York City

Project Reach NYC is a non-profit organization in New York City that focuses on the empowerment of youth. It was founded in 1971 by several Asian American community activists with support of the Chinese-American Planning Council to help immigrant youth in response to the rise of Chinese youth gangs in the city.
