= Urooj Arshad =

American activist

Urooj Arshad (born 1975) is an American activist who was a co-founder the Muslim Alliance for Sexual and Gender Diversity, where she is also a member of the steering committee.

== Early life and education ==
Arshad was born in Pakistan in a house built by her grandfather. Her middle-class, secular Sunni Muslim family lived in Karachi, where her father worked for a petrol company and her mother was a teacher at a military school. Her parents' families both originated from Punjab, and immigrated to Pakistan after Partition. She also had two younger brothers.

She attended PECHS Girls School, a private school that taught in English. As a teenager, Arshad began developing crushes on girls in her school, although she did not have the language to identify them as such. She also began to question gender roles and stopped wearing jewelry and only wore white clothing in an attempt to present in a gender-neutral fashion.

She immigrated to the United States with her family in August 1992, when she was 16 years old, due to increasing violence in the country. They initially lived in the Chicago suburbs with her uncle and his family, who had sponsored the family's immigration. Arshad completed her final year of high school in the United States, where she experienced racism from her teachers and peers.

Arshad attended the University of Illinois Urbana-Champaign, where she initially studied a pre-med track. She later switched her major to sociology, with a minor in women's studies. She graduated in 1998.

She came out to her brother at age 19, who then outed her to her mother. Her father died shortly afterward when she was 20.

== Activism ==
Arshad became involved in LGBTQ organizing in 1999.

In 2011, she organized the LGBTQ Muslim Retreat. In 2012, she was a fellow at the American Muslim Civic Leadership Institute.

In 2017, Arshad was working at Advocates for Youth as their associate director for International Youth Health and Rights. That same year, she launched the Muslim Youth Leadership Council, a support group for LGBTQ Muslim youth and their supporters.

She is the senior program manager for LGBT issues at Freedom House as of 2021.

== Personal life ==
She identifies as queer and a cultural Muslim.
