= Network on Religion and Justice =

The Network on Religion and Justice (NRJ) is a community organization founded in 2004 for Asian Pacific Islander LGBTQ people of faith and allies.

NRJ was founded by faith leaders in response to anti-marriage equality protests following Governor Gavin Newsom's legalization of same-sex marriage in California. Members of NRJ were some of the first prominent API faith leaders to openly support the LGBT community.

== Projects ==
In God's House is a documentary created by NRJ to tell the story about the experiences of LGBT-identified people. The film has been screened in churches and film festivals in the United States and internationally.
