= Chinese-American Planning Council =

Non-profit in New York City

Chinese-American Planning Council, Inc.
- Formation: 1965; 61 years ago
- Type: 501(c)(3) organization
- Tax ID no.: 13-6202692
- Headquarters: Chinatown, New York, NY
- Services: Early Childhood Services; School-Age Child Care Services; Youth Services; Community Service; Workforce Development; Senior Services
- Key people: Virginia Kee (Founding Member); Wayne Ho (President &CEO)
- Website: cpc-nyc.org

Founded in 1965, the Chinese-American Planning Council, Inc. (CPC) (traditional Chinese: 華人策劃協會; simplified Chinese: 华人策划协会; pinyin: Huárén Cèhuà Xiéhuì; Jyutping: Waa4jan4 Caak3waak6 Hip3wui6) is one of the largest non-profit providers of educational, social, and community services for Asian-Americans in the United States. It now services over 8,000 people daily through some 50+ programs at over 30 locations citywide. It administers early childhood, school-age child care, youth, community, workforce development, and senior services. Its mission is to serve the Chinese-American, immigrant, and low-income communities in New York City by providing services, skills, and resources towards economic self-sufficiency.

== History ==
The Chinese-American Planning Council, Inc., originally the Chinatown Planning Council (CPC), was founded in 1965 as a grassroots community-based organization in response to the tremendous influx of Chinese immigrants after the change in immigration laws and amid the Great Society movement. Initially, CPC volunteers counseled families by referring them to local schools and provided case management services to help immigrants adjust to their new homes. Filling a void in the community as the first social service agency to serve Chinese-Americans in New York, CPC began to expand its services based on the needs expressed by those in the community.

In 1966, CPC launched its Head Start Program and youth programs for preschool and school-age children. In 1970 it opened its first child care center; in 1971, it began its seminal youth program, Project Reach; and in 1972, it opened the Project Open Door Senior Citizen Center. It helped construct two uniquely conceived senior citizen residential buildings, Everlasting Pine and Hong Ning. In 1975, it launched its employment & training services with the English Language Center, which provided new immigrants with badly needed job-readiness skills training and workplace English instruction. The Chinese-American Arts Council, a CPC subsidiary, was founded in 1975.

By 1983, CPC provided home care services to senior citizens through its Home Attendant Program, which continues to burgeon as the population ages. The need of low English proficient, home-bound seniors for language-appropriate, culturally sensitive care prompted the launch of CPC's Mature Workers program to train home attendants, which also answered the need for middle-aged workers to find low-skill employment that didn't require English fluency.

Since the late 1970s, as the gentrification of Chinatown, Manhattan pushed up rental costs, immigrants began to move to Brooklyn and Queens, and CPC followed suit, setting up Queens (Chinatown, Flushing) and Brooklyn (Chinatown, Brooklyn) offices and changing its name and vision from the Chinatown Planning Council to the Chinese-American Planning Council. The community continued to evolve in the 1990s, with the majority of undocumented immigrants flowing in from China's Fujian Province and facing challenges that are unique yet similar to the trajectory of waves of earlier Chinese immigrants.

After the tragedy of 9/11 in 2001, one-quarter of Chinatown's workforce was out of work. CPC responded immediately by launching 9/11 relief services to help dislocated workers access emergency assistance, serving more clients than any other program in the community (3,180) due to CPC's reputation and ability to refer clients in-house to its other services. As the economic slump continued in the year after 9/11, CPC transitioned its 9/11 program to meeting long-term employment and training needs as well as ongoing case management needs, training over 800 clients and placing over 50%, a remarkable feat given the economic climate.

CPC has recently achieved accreditation for its childcare centers and received three licenses to open vocational and business schools. A new program enables clients not qualified for government assistance to pay for their employment workshops and placement assistance. The Workforce Development Division is enhancing its focus on healthcare training programs to meet client and market needs in the changing economy and has introduced a new Food Protection program. In January 2005, CPC opened a one-stop multi-social services center to connect clients to services focusing on mental health, while the Brooklyn branch is conducting mental health outreach among community seniors.

Over the years, CPC has honored many people of Chinese descent who have become outstanding leaders in their fields, including architect I.M. Pei (1978), musician Yo-Yo Ma (1983), fashion designer Vera Wang (1993), Major John Fugh (1994), film director Ang Lee (1996), Nobel Prize winner Dr. Daniel C. Tsui (1999), Pulitzer Prize-winning journalist and author Sheryl WuDunn (2011), among others.

CPC holds two major events, a biennial Brooklyn Bridge Walk-A-Thon with a Family Day Fair and an annual Chinese New Year Dinner. Many elected officials support the events and CPC, including New York City Comptroller John Liu, New York State Assembly Speaker Sheldon Silver, New York State Senator Tom Duane, New York City Council Member Margaret Chin, Brooklyn Borough President Marty Markowitz, and many others.

In April 2025, the United States House Committee on Homeland Security announced that it was investigating CPC for the "potential use of federal funds" to "facilitate illegal immigration."

== Main office and branches ==
CPC has three main offices located in New York City. The main office is located in Chinatown in Manhattan, while the other two branches are located in Flushing, Queens and Sunset Park, Brooklyn. Each office provides different services to the community.

=== Main office ===
150 Elizabeth Street is home to the Chinese-American Planning Council's Administration, Fiscal Office, Human Resources, and Volunteer and Internship Program. Located on the edges of Chinatown, Little Italy, Manhattan and SoHo, CPC strives to build a better community for all, not only in Manhattan but Queens and Brooklyn also through satellite branch offices.

=== Queens branch ===
The Queens branch of the Chinese-American Planning Council was established in 1979 in response to the rapidly growing Chinese American population in Queens, especially in Community Districts 7, 4, and 3. The branch serves over 500 individuals daily and is Queens's biggest Chinese American social service agency. Services include senior citizen services, youth services, after-school daycare, employment and training, and services to Asian parents of intellectual disability and developmental disabilities.

- Digital Inclusion Initiative (DII)
- Multi-Social Services (MSS)
- Senior Community Service and Employment Program (SCSCEP)
- Services For Families with Special Needs

=== Brooklyn branch ===
In response to the growing needs of Chinese Americans in Brooklyn, the CPC Brooklyn branch was established in 1979 on Church Avenue. Since then the CPC Brooklyn branch has grown to serve over 600 individuals daily. The Brooklyn branch is currently located on 8th Avenue and aims to serve the rapidly increasing Chinese immigrant population in the borough of Brooklyn, especially in the Sunset Park and Bay Ridge area.

Some programs offered by the CPC Brooklyn branch office include Beacon and after-school childcare programs. Programs that operate out of the branch office include senior services, housing services, and other multi-social service programs.

- Multi-Social Services (MSS)
- Services to Asian Parents of the Developmentally Disabled (SAPDD)
- Senior Services
- Weekend Services

== Programs and services ==
CPC provides over 50 programs at their 25+ locations citywide. These programs include community, daycare, workforce, senior citizen, and youth services.

=== Community services ===
CPC provides Multi-Social Services (MSS) in Manhattan, Brooklyn, and Queens. CPC's MSS Programs provide comprehensive and accessible benefits for low-income residents and non-English speaking immigrants in predominantly Chinese areas. Bilingual counselors and outreach workers take a proactive and culturally sensitive approach through individual, family, and group counseling. They also visit local work sites and street fairs, participate in radio talks and advocate for the needy by seeking access to resources and government entitlement programs.

- Asian Family Services
- Asian Child Care Resources and Referrals
- HIV/AIDS Services
- Multi-Social Services Center
- Special Needs
- Project C.O.P.E (Community Outreach and Public Education)

=== Daycare services ===
CPC boasts twelve daycare and after-school centers designed for multi-ethnic families, many with non-English-speaking immigrant parents who both work full-time but have no funds for private childcare. Whatever the age group, CPC child care centers believe that family and community are essential facets of children's lives.

CPC's early child care centers and school-age child care centers serve children ages six months to 12 years. Garment Industry Day Care and Little Star Of Broome Street are NAEYC (National Association for The Education of Young Children) accredited preschool programs. Confucius Plaza SACCC @ PS 124 is accredited by COA (the Council on Accreditation).

=== Early child care centers ===
The curriculum includes multicultural activities that promote appreciation of all cultures.

- Chung Pak Day Care
- Garment Industry Day Care
- Jacob Riis Child Care Center
- Little Star of Broome Street

=== School-Age Child Care Centers (SACCC) ===
School-age daycare centers provide homework assistance during the school year and recreational and enrichment activities year-round. Children enjoy team sports, music, and dance, have access to museums and libraries, and participate in community events.

- Baxter St. SACCC – PS 130
- Chrystie St. SACCC – PS 42
- Confucius Plaza SACCC – PS 124
- Pike St. SACCC – PS 2
- Queens Day Care – PS 20

== Workforce ==
The Workforce Division of the CPC was created in 1975 in response to an acute need for skilled workers in New York City. The program's primary mission is to provide advanced services, skill upgrades, and employment-related resources to individuals motivated to advance their careers.

- Adult Literacy Program
- Career Center
- Hospitality Career Training Program

== Senior center services ==
Tens of thousands of seniors are members of CPC's three popular seniors centers and the rapidly growing Brooklyn Seniors Services. Regular members enjoy congregate meals, meals-on-wheels (through Open Door Seniors Citizen Center), a wide variety of social and recreational activities, field trips, exercise classes, educational workshops, information & referral, access to healthcare, entitlements/benefits application assistance and advocacy, senior housing services, pre-planning and bereavement services, ESL and citizenship classes, and more. An initiative at Brooklyn Senior Services is developing better preventive mental health services to serve the aging population's changing needs. Seniors also have access to CPC's affiliate, the Home Attendant Program, which provides home care for the home-bound.

CPC Senior Center men dancing to "New York, New York"

Brooklyn

- Brooklyn Senior Services

Manhattan

- Chinatown Senior Citizen Center
- Open Door Senior Citizen Center

Queens

- Nan Shan Senior Center,

== Youth services ==
CPC Youth Services provides dynamic educational, vocational, and recreational programs that promote leadership development, identity formation, and social and academic success, help youth expand their choices in community involvement, and overcome cultural barriers in society and school-based settings. Whether they are acquiring job skills through summer employment, touring university campuses across the region, volunteering to clean up city parks, or performing dance routines at community events, CPC youth form strong relationships with peers and mentors in a safe and supportive environment.

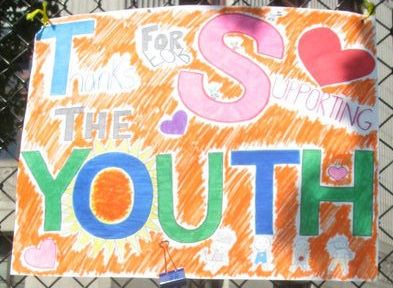
Support Youth Poster at CPC's walkathon

=== Manhattan Youth ===
- Project Gateway (College Counseling & Education Center)
- In-School Youth/Transition to Adult Program - Manhattan
- Summer Youth Employment Program - Manhattan (SYEP)
- 21st Century Community Learning Center @ Lower East Side Prep. H.S.
- Neighborhood Development Area Program & Extended School Day/School Violence Prevention @ H.S. for Dual Language & Asian Studies
- Attendance Improvement & Dropout Prevention @ Landmark H.S.

CPC volunteers tabling at an event to outreach to the community

=== Manhattan programs that serve youth ===
- Project Reach
- Volunteer and Internship Program (VIP)

=== Brooklyn Youth ===
- OST Program @ New Utrecht H.S.
- Service Learning Program
- Summer Youth Employment Program – Brooklyn (SYEP)
- Young Adult Employment – Brooklyn

=== Brooklyn programs that serve youth ===
- After-school Program and Summer Camp at PS 97
- After-school Program at PS 153
- CPC Beacon at IS 220

=== Queens Youth ===
- Youth Options Program
- Summer Youth Employment Program – Queens (SYEP)
- In-school Youth/Transition to Adult Program – Queens
- Neighborhood Development Area Program
- Young Adult Internship Program – Queens
