= Lavender Phoenix =

American non-profit organization

- Formation: 2004
- Type: Nonprofit
- Location: San Francisco, California, U.S.
- Region served: Bay Area
- Executive Director: Yuan Wang
- Website: lavenderphoenix.org
- Formerly called: API Equality – Northern California

Lavender Phoenix, formerly known as API Equality – Northern California is an American social justice advocacy non-profit headquartered in San Francisco, California. Its mission is to build the power and self-determination and increase the visibility of the lesbian, gay, bisexual, transgender, and queer Asian Pacific Islander (LGBTQ API) community.

The organization was founded in 2004 in response to a large rally against same-sex marriage organized by the Chinese Christian community in the San Francisco Bay Area. It organized the first ever contingent in support of same-sex marriage to appear in San Francisco's Chinese New Year Parade and was a founding member of the campaign against California's anti-same-sex marriage ballot initiative, Proposition 8.

Its current programming includes its LGBTQ API leadership development program and the Dragon Fruit Project.

== History ==
On April 25, 2004, a largely Asian American and Christian crowd of more than 7,000, organized by Chinese Christian leaders, rallied in San Francisco to protest the legalization of same-sex marriage.

Lavender Phoenix was founded in 2004 in response to this rally to provide a voice from the API community in support of same-sex marriage. At its inception, it was called Asian Pacific American Coalition for Equality (APACE), although soon changing its name to API Equality, then APIENC. Lavender Phoenix has since evolved into a multi-issue organization working for equality and justice in Northern California and in the state's API and LGBTQ communities.

Lavender Phoenix is fiscally sponsored by Chinese for Affirmative Action, an API civil rights organization based in Northern California that advances social justice for the Chinese and API communities.

On April 27, 2022, the organization was renamed from API Equality - Northern California to Lavender Phoenix as an homage to Lavender Godzilla and Phoenix Rising, two LGBTQ API newsletters in the Bay Area in the 1980s.

== Special projects ==
=== Up to Us ===
Up to Us was a study of the lived experiences of Bay Area trans and gender non-conforming Asian and Pacific Islanders (TGNC API) to understand the needs of this specific demographic. Furthermore, Lavender Phoenix staff provided peer counseling for TGNC API individuals.

The study concluded that TGNC API individuals in the Bay Area are in need of stable housing, supportive workspaces and health care.

=== Dragon Fruit Museum ===
The Dragon Fruit Museum is a multigenerational oral history documentation of queer API individuals’ experiences, including the Dragon Fruit Podcast.

=== Queer Possibilities ===
Movie directed by one of Lavender Phoenix's leaders, Sammie Wills, and another trans and queer API activist, Vince Crisostomo, that illustrates their experiences as queer and trans API individuals and on queer and trans API activism.

== Accomplishments ==
- 2005: Organized the first contingent in support of same-sex marriage in the San Francisco Chinese New Year parade, which is the largest Asian cultural event in North America and reaches millions of spectators in the San Francisco Bay Area and across the world.
- 2007: With sister organization API Equality – LA, spearheaded the development of an Asian American amicus brief signed by over 63 local, state, and national API organizations in support of the California same-sex marriage cases.
- 2007: Was a founding member of both the Let California Ring and Equality for All/No on Prop 8 Campaigns.
- 2010: Launched ongoing intensive summer internship program to develop the next generation of LGBTQ API social justice and cultural change leaders.
- 2011: Organized the first queer and Asian flash mob in the heart of San Francisco's Chinatown with over 100 participants.
- 2012: Conducted first-of-its-kind qualitative research in Filipino communities on LGBTQ issues and people.
- 2012 to Present: Launched Dragon Fruit Project with Amy Sueyoshi, Associate Dean of the College of Ethnic Studies at San Francisco State University. The Dragon Fruit Project is an intergenerational oral history project that explores LGBTQ API people and their experiences with love and activism in the 1960s-1990s. Interviews and documents from the Dragon Fruit Project have been on exhibit at the GLBT History Museum in San Francisco since 2014.
