= Apicha =

Community health center in New York City

Apicha Community Health Center
- Founded: 1989; 37 years ago
- Type: community health center
- Legal status: 501(c)(3)
- Headquarters: New York City
- CEO: Therese R. Rodriguez
- Revenue: $19,562,006 (2023)
- Expenses: $17,741,199 (2023)
- Employees: 174 (2023)
- Volunteers: 54 (2023)
- Website: https://www.apicha.org/
- Formerly called: Asian and Pacific Islander Coalition on HIV/ AIDS (APICHA)

Apicha or Apicha Community Health Center is a community health center located in New York City. Founded in 1989 as the Asian and Pacific Islander Coalition on HIV/AIDS, Apicha was initially an AIDS services organization focusing on the needs of the Asian Pacific Islander community. Around 2009, Apicha transitioned into a community health center providing care to multiple marginalized communities, eventually becoming a federally qualified health center (FQHC).

== History ==
=== 1989-2008: AIDS Services Organization ===
In 1989, Apicha was founded as the Asian and Pacific Islander Coalition on HIV/AIDS to provide HIV/AIDS services to the Asian Pacific Islander (API) community. According to the founders, healthcare providers were treating the API community as a single group and were not addressing the unique cultural needs of the multiple, diverse API communities. Apicha aimed to provide services tailored to distinct Asian communities, for example by offering services in multiple Asian languages. For the first few years, their work consisted primarily of volunteers providing HIV prevention education in neighborhoods with large Asian populations, including Sunset Park and Chinatown.

In the 1980s, the Centers for Disease Control and Prevention (CDC) reported race data for 3 groups—Black, White, and Other. Apicha allied with members of the Native American community to lobby James O. Mason to order the CDC to report data about two additional groups—Asian and Pacific Islanders and Native Americans. Their efforts were successful, making it possible to estimate the impact of HIV/AIDS on these two communities.

In 1996, Apicha won a grant from the Health Resources and Services Administration (HRSA). With the additional funding, Apicha was able to open a community center and expand their staff and services. The grant funded the Bridges Project, which was designed to mitigate various obstacles to accessing medical services faced by APIs living with HIV. Through the Bridges Project, Apicha staff assisted APIs with HIV to receive care at partner organizations by providing escorts, language services, and help with applying for benefits. Additionally, Apicha trained staff at the partner organizations in cultural competence. A later program evaluation of the Bridges Project found that Apicha was successful in increasing the number of services received by APIs who were undocumented or had limited English proficiency.

Therese R. Rodriguez became Apicha's Chief Executive Officer in 1997, a position she still holds as of 2024.

By 2000, Apicha had 75 peer educators who spoke multiple Asian languages, including Bengali, Tagalog, and Chinese dialects. Apicha continued to provide HIV education through various means, including meeting with community leaders, talking with taxi drivers, and tabling at street fairs. Apicha also provided case management and support services for people with HIV. In 2003, Apicha began offering medical services for the first time at their primary care clinic for people with HIV.

=== 2009-Present: Transition to community health center ===
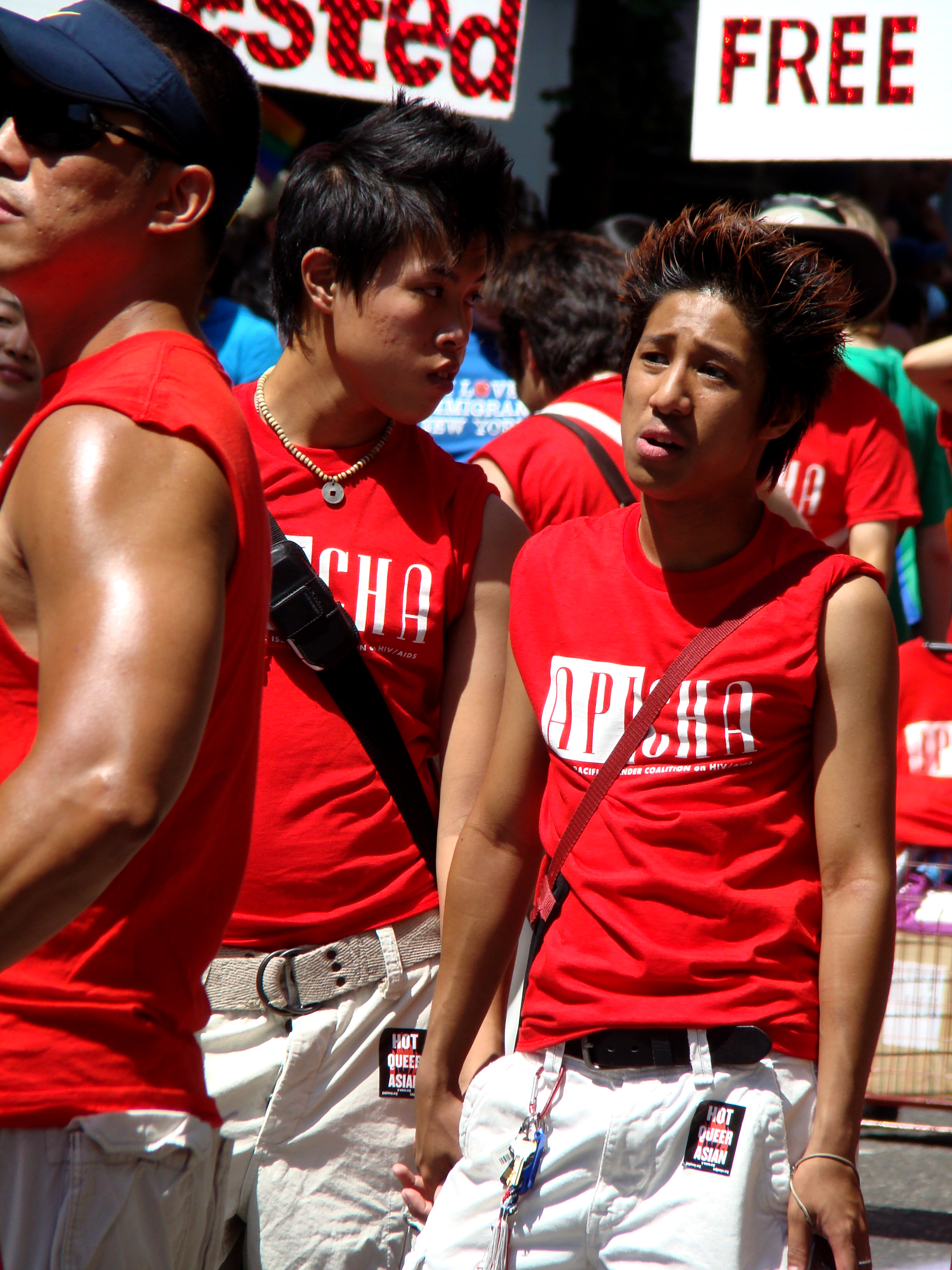
Apicha at the NYC Pride March on June 24th, 2007.

Around 2009, Apicha transitioned from an AIDS services organization into a community health center for underserved communities, particularly the LGBTQ community, people with HIV, APIs, and other people of color. Two years later, the organization opened a trans health clinic with funding from the Paul Rapaport Foundation. The clinic provides primary care, mental health, hormone therapy, and support services for the transgender community as well as cultural competence trainings for partner organizations. For some time, the trans health clinic was managed by Cecilia Gentili, who expanded the number of patients from a handful to several hundred. After receiving a New Access Point grant from HRSA to provide primary care to underserved populations, Apicha became a federally qualified health center in 2015.

In 2017, Apicha expanded their community health center in Chinatown and planned for a second location in Jackson Heights. Around this time, more than 70% of their clients were LGBTQ and a third were API. During the COVID-19 pandemic, Apicha delivered services virtually. Additionally they provided COVID-19 services like testing, PPE, and vaccination. New York State awarded the organization $1 million to increase vaccination in the API community through outreach and education. A second Apicha community health center opened in Jackson Heights in 2023.

== Social Media Ad Controversy ==
In 2019, Apicha attempted to promote ads on social media discussing the benefits of PrEP, a drug used for HIV prevention. The ad, part of a PrEP awareness campaign funded by the New York State Department of Health, was designed to reach API men who have sex with men. Twitter initially rejected the ad for containing Adult Content but overturned this decision upon Apicha's appeal. Facebook blocked the ads as "political" and required them to go through an additional verification process. Apicha noted that their long-running ads promoting PrEP to women had not been similarly blocked by Facebook.

Facebook's actions have been criticized by members of the LGBTQ and healthcare community, including Gilead Sciences, the pharmaceutical company that produces the PrEP drug Truvada. A Facebook spokesperson stated that the additional verification process was necessary due to users who had "abused" topics related to social issues, including equal access to healthcare, during the 2016 elections. Reporting about the controversy noted that Facebook has also blocked ads posted by LGBTQ groups, allowed ads about a Truvada-related lawsuit, and allowed false political claims.

Eventually Facebook approved the ads, and Apicha credited the news coverage of the controversy with increasing the social media campaign's reach.
