= Tarab NYC =

American volunteer-run non-profit

- Formation: 2012
- Founder: Bashar Makhay
- Website: tarabnyc.org

Tarab NYC is an American volunteer-run non-profit that works to foster an inclusive and safe community of lesbian, gay, bisexual, trans, queer, and/or gender non-conforming Arab, Middle Eastern, and/or North African people in the greater New York City area. The group organizes programs such as support groups, happy hours, potlucks, drag shows, and advocacy efforts.

== History ==
Tarab NYC was founded in 2012 by Bashar Makhay, who is Chaldean-Iraqi, American, Catholic and gay. When Makhay's sexuality became public at the age of 19, his mother told him to be straight or move out. He decided to leave, and eventually moved to New York.

Post-9/11, Makhay felt unsafe because of Americans' association of Arabs with terrorists. Simultaneously, he was craving community and wanted to challenge the idea that he could only be one identity at a time. He founded Tarab NYC to build a space for queer Arabs outside of the nightclub scene. About 100 attendees show up to every Tarab NYC event.

Tarab NYC was credited in a 2019 study as a "powerful protective factor" against feelings of isolation and suicidality amongst the queer Middle Eastern American community.

In 2019, the staff of Tarab NYC was honored at Brooklyn Borough Hall's "Embrace Your Hyphen" event, for its work on behalf of Arabs in Brooklyn.

In 2024, Tarab NYC exhibited a large "Free Palestine" float at the NYC Pride March, chanting "no pride in genocide" and drawing cheers from the crowd. Those marching with the group had participated in a de-escalation training after previously being heckled and chased by counter-protestors at a Pride event in Brooklyn. Diasporic Arab and Muslim queer groups such as Tarab NYC increasingly emerged in the 1990s and 2000s, and were quickly active in the Palestine solidarity movement.

Tarab NYC is a co-host of the annual Color Me Queer, a party for queer and trans BIPOC. During Ramadan, they host an LGBTQ+ Community Iftar at New York's Lesbian, Gay, Bisexual & Transgender Community Center, in collaboration with local organizations.
