= AIDS service organization =

AIDS service organizations are community-based organizations that provide support for people affected by HIV/AIDS. This article focuses on HIV/AIDS service organizations in the United States only. However, similar organizations in other countries, such as Canada, also played significant roles during the HIV/AIDS crisis and share many common experiences and challenges.

There is a huge variety of these organizations in order to provide for the wide variety of needs of HIV/AIDS patients and their families. The majority of these organizations are healthcare-based, providing assistance with testing, treatment, preventative medicines like pre-exposure prophylaxis (PrEP), needle and syringe exchanges and more. Another prominent type of AIDS service organization is education-based, working to raise awareness and public understanding of topics like the transmission of HIV, safe sex, treatment resources, as well as eliminating rampant misconceptions about HIV/AIDS. Other organizations provide services like legal advice and/or advocacy, mental health and counseling services, and fundraising and community outreach.

These organizations are vital in providing for patients needs, as well as reducing the economic impact of HIV/AIDS, strengthening global health, and countering the social and political imbalances which disproportionately impact HIV/AIDS patients.

== Development ==
The discovery of AIDS patients in the United States in the 1980s created a need for resources to be provided to patients and others affected by the disease. This is not unique to HIV/AIDS, there are organizations providing similar services for other diseases like cancer organizations and diabetes organizations.

Many HIV/AIDS organizations are expansions of previously existing LGBTQ health organizations, which are present in 32 states and have evolved over time to serve the shifting needs of the LGBTQ community. These organizations were created to serve LGBTQ people's specific healthcare concerns as well as counteract the impact of social determinants, stigma, and bias. They readily adapted to address the HIV/AIDS epidemic. One example is the Los Angeles LGBT Center, the largest LGBT service organization in the world. But not all AIDS service organizations were first LGBT centers. One of the most prominent early AIDS-specific organizations was/is New York's Gay Men's Health Crisis.

Community-based AIDS organizations also worked collaboratively with widespread activist efforts to demand federal and social support, recognition, and equality.

== Services ==
These organizations provide a wide array of services to match the wide array of need, which is attributable to the interconnectedness of healthcare with poverty and social issues.

Medical services are the priority of most of these organizations, due to factors which prevent many HIV/AIDS patients from receiving adequate care from mainstream healthcare providers. These factors include real or perceived discrimination in healthcare facilities and insurance companies, lack of cultural competence among healthcare providers about LGBT issues, and patients not wanting to be associated with AIDS, and/or, in some cases, the LBGT community. This is still widely occurring today but was especially prevalent during the HIV/AIDS crisis. "The optimal provision of health care and prevention services to sexual and gender minorities requires providers to be sensitive to historical stigmatization, to be informed about continued barriers to care and the differential prevalence of specific risk factors and health conditions in these populations, and to become aware of the cultural aspects of their interactions with LGBT patients." Especially during the AIDS crisis, this was just not reality and AIDS service organizations were forced to fill in the gap. AIDS organizations provide testing, treatment, symptom management, mental health services, and more.

Additionally, AIDS service organizations provide resources beyond medical services. The lack of knowledge about AIDS and the resulting panic and misinformation was the motivating force behind many community service organizations who worked to provide education and dispel myths about the disease. This continues to be an enormous issue today and is one of the most important services AIDS organizations provides. They also can provide community health and wellness education, personal and family counseling, healthy sexuality and sexually transmitted infection prevention awareness, safe sex materials, and legal advice and services.

== Obstacles ==
AIDS service organizations face the same obstacles that all health and social service organizations face: struggles for funding, labor, and resources, as well as the constant battle against a devastating illness. But there are many things which specifically hinder the efforts of AIDS organizations. HIV/AIDS "plagues the world's most vulnerable people" and they are highly dependent on service organizations due to marginalization, stigma, and fear of social and legal retribution, both currently but especially during the height of the AIDS crisis. "Health disparities are very evident" as HIV/AIDS patients are disproportionately MSM, transgender women, low-income, and/or people of color. HIV/AIDS also heavily impacts people suffering from IV drug addiction and/or homelessness. These are the people who are dependent on community centers and service organizations.

The AIDS crisis was shadowed by constant politicization which magnified the struggles of HIV/AIDS patients, as well as heavily hindered research and the search for treatment and/or a cure. The HIV virus was not discovered to be the cause of AIDS until 1984, and the first treatment, AZT, was not approved until 1987. So there were long periods of time following the emergence of HIV/AIDS in which there was no treatment, and community organizations could only focus on symptom management and social activism to push for a cure. Once treatment was discovered and approved, it was sold for an extraordinary price. In 1989, AZT was the most expensive prescription drug in history. Very few patients could afford to be treated or remain on the treatment for the long-term plan that was necessary to sufficiently lower patient's viral loads.

Many AIDS organizations faced pushback from local communities as fear of GRID or the gay cancer was rampant and coupled with widespread political, legal, and social discrimination and homophobia. The case of Ryan White gained enormous media attention due to his experience with community alienation.

There was a huge disparity between resources depending on geographic location within the United States. Organizations stemming from pre-existing LGBT centers were really isolated to urban coastal spaces.

Community-based health organizations, especially HIV/AIDS organizations, are extremely dependent on volunteer labor. 21% of LGBT community organizations rely completely on volunteer labor, and 57% have fewer than five paid staff positions.

Another obstacle is the immediacy of need. HIV/AIDS is an infectious disease, therefore treatment is necessary both for the patients own health and well-being, but also to prevent the spread of the disease.
