= LGBTQ culture in Paris =

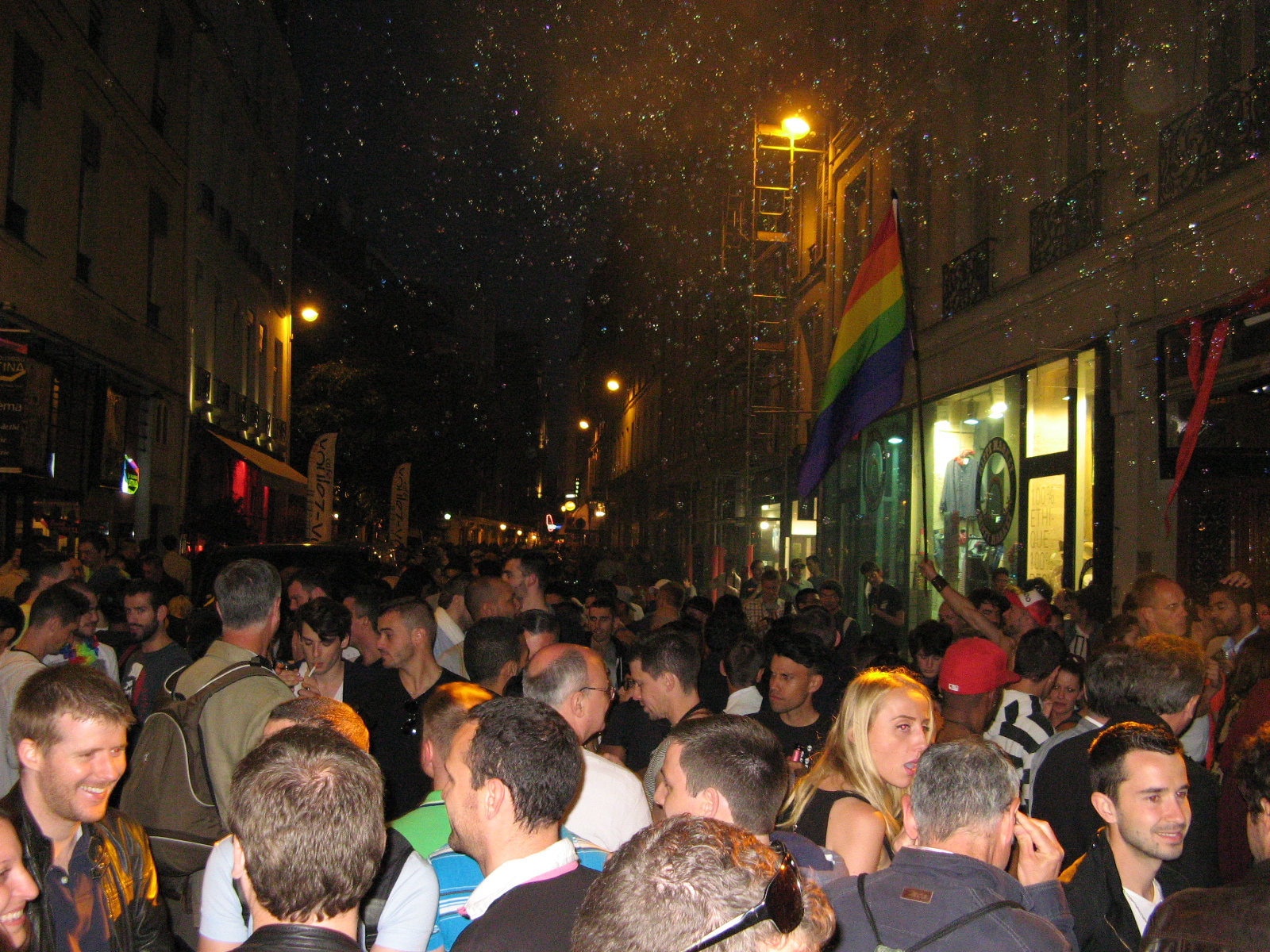
Gay village in Le Marais

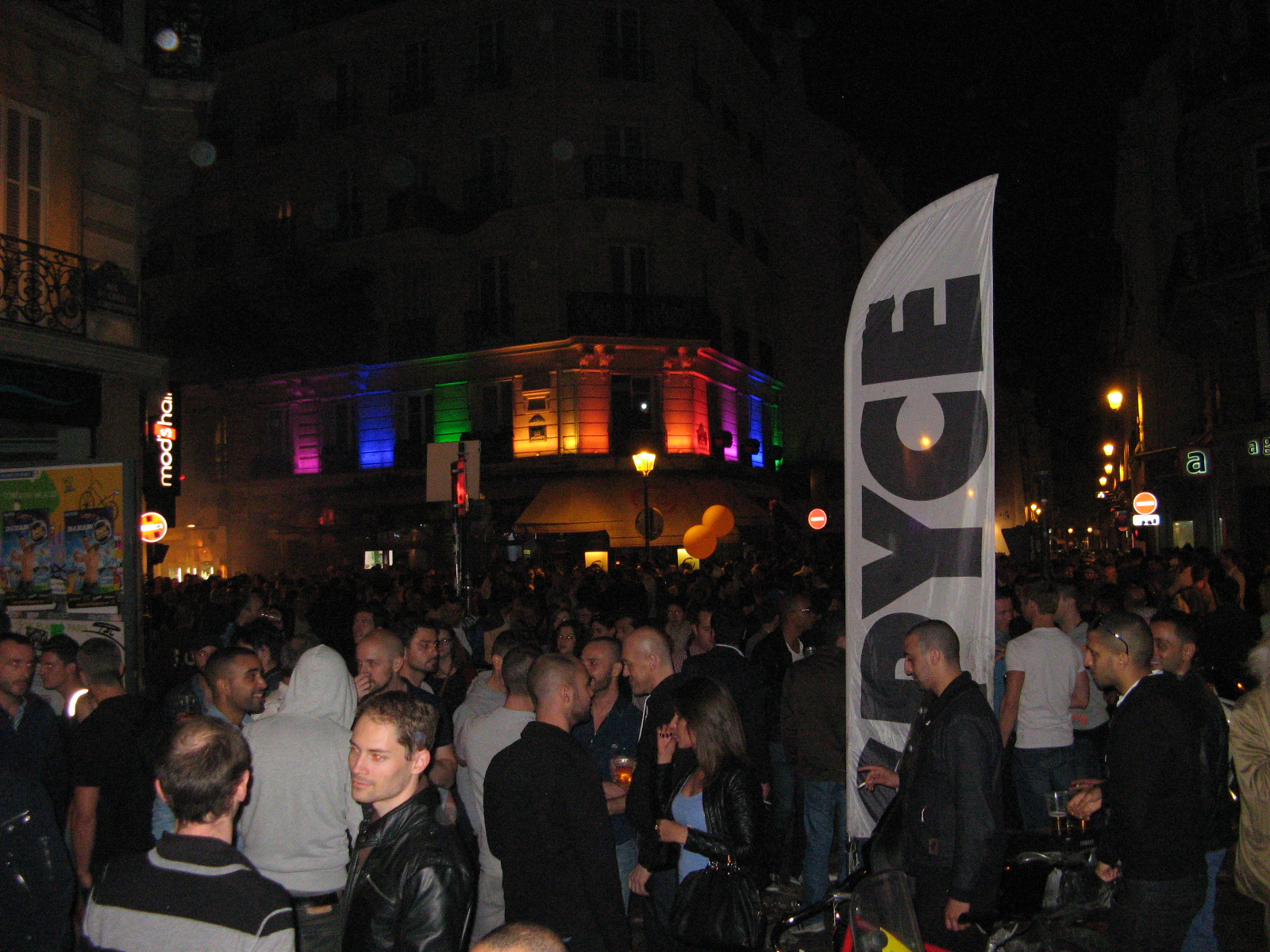
Le Marais, Paris

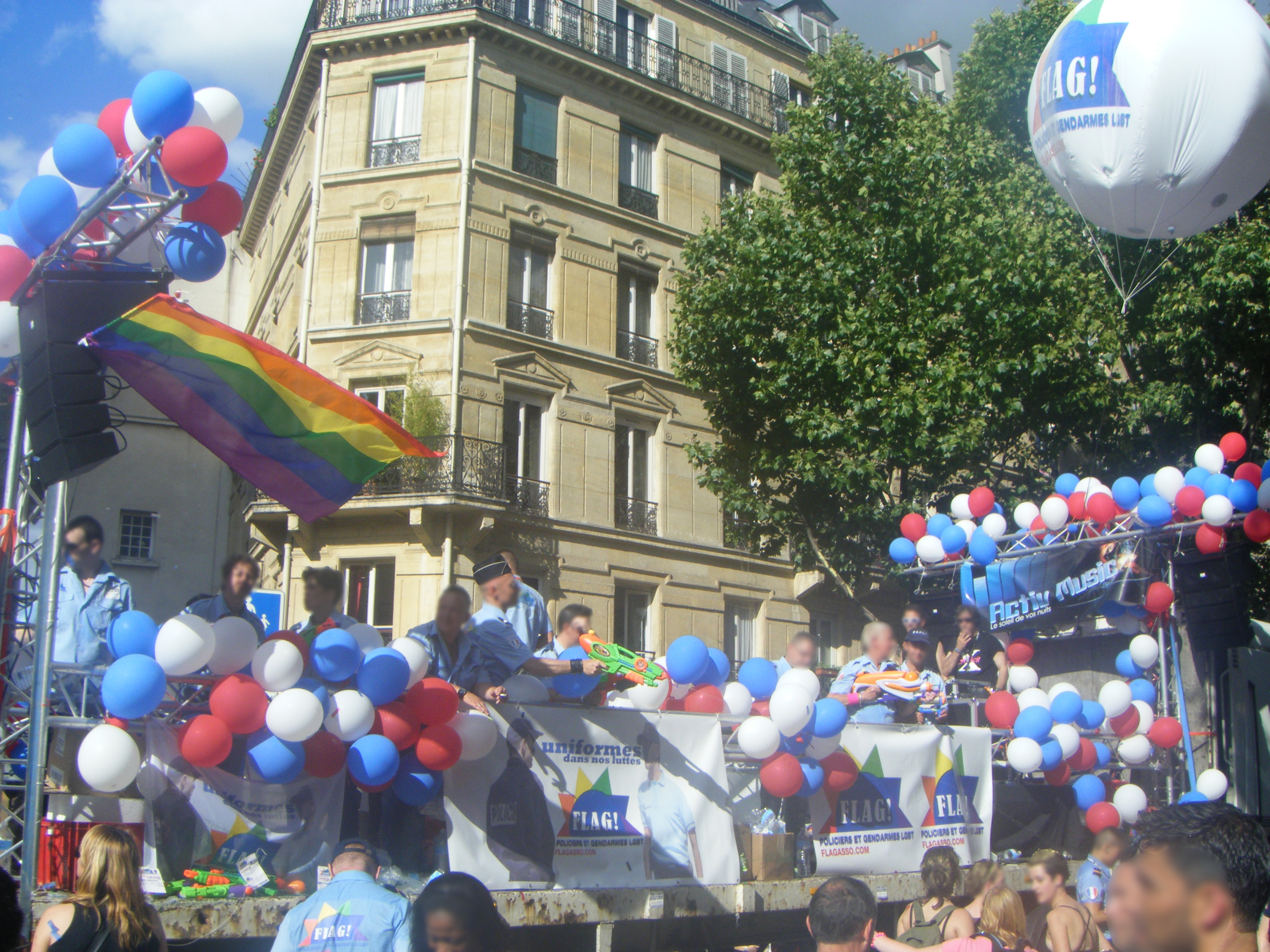
Paris Pride

Paris, the capital of France, has an active LGBTQ community. In the 1990s, 46% of the country's gay men lived in the city. As of 2004, Paris had 140 LGBT bars, clubs, hotels, restaurants, shops, and other commercial businesses. Florence Tamagne, author of "Paris: 'Resting on its Laurels'?", wrote that there is a "Gaité parisienne"; she added that Paris "competes with Berlin for the title of LGBT capital of Europe, and ranks only second behind New York for the title of LGBT capital of the world." It has France's only gayborhoods that are officially organized.

== History ==
=== Middle Ages to French Revolution ===
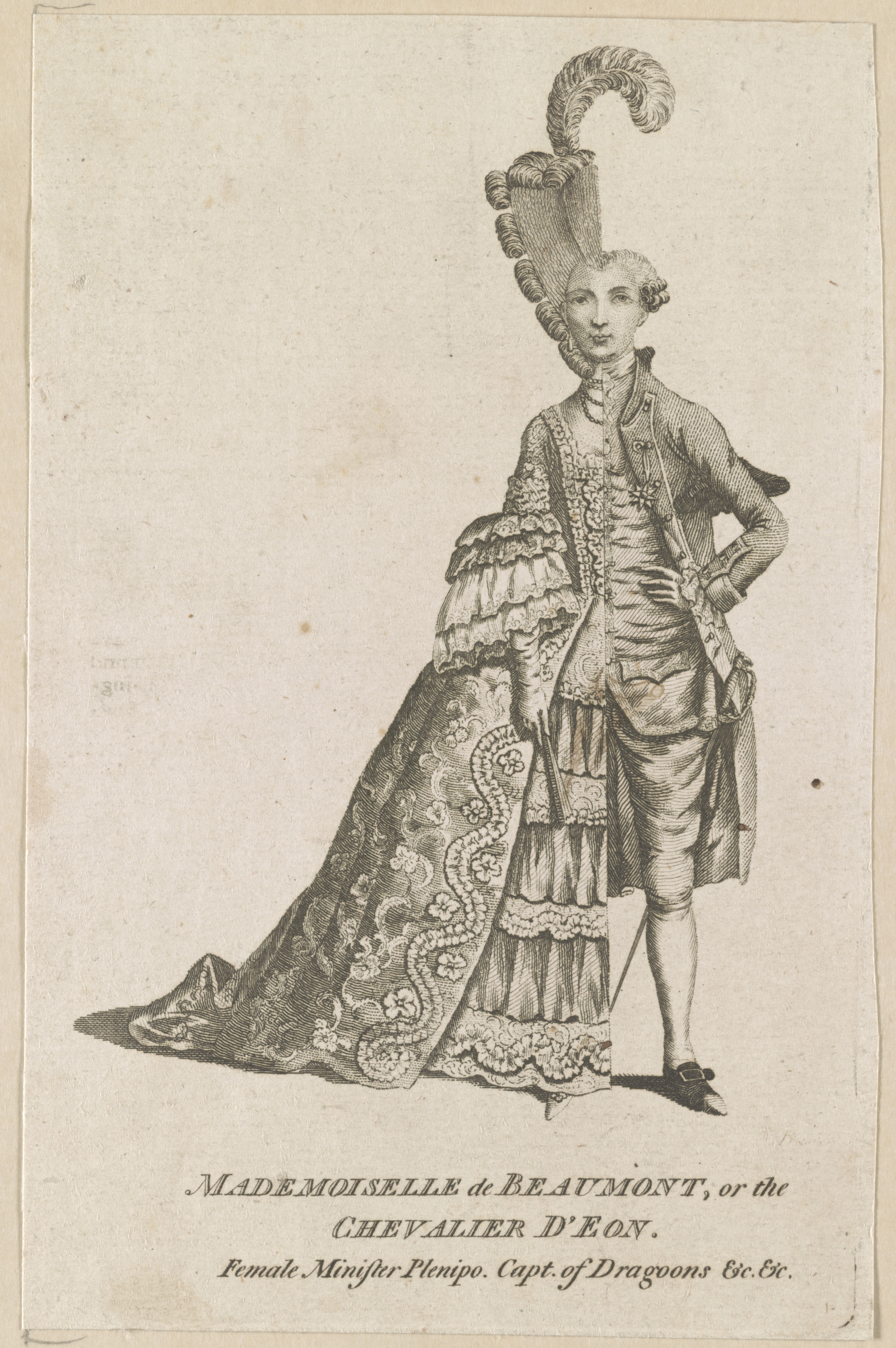
Caricature of Chevalier d'Éon dressed half in women's clothes, half in men's clothes

Paris' reputation as a center for queer life dates back as far as the Middle Ages, according to Michael D. Sibalis, who notes a twelfth-century poet's description of the city as full of "the vice of Sodom". Throughout the Middle Ages however, poor Parisian artisans were regularly convicted and sometimes executed for engaging in sodomy and other same-sex activities. Historian Maurice Lever notes that by the eighteenth century, various subcultures had developed into a "homosexual world" in Paris, "with its own language, rules, codes, rivalries and clans." There is also historical evidence that lesbian relationships occurred among aristocratic women of that century, as well as lesbian subcultures among the city's prostitutes.

Among the 17th century male aristocracy, Philippe I, Duke of Orléans and Louis Joseph de Bourbon, Duke of Vendôme were known to have relationships with men. Gay writers Henri-Lambert de Thibouville and Charles, marquis de Villette were both friends of Voltaire. Mlle Raucourt, was a popular 18th-century actress until her affairs with women scandalized Paris and her career took a nosedive.

A gay couple, Jean Diot and Bruno Lenoir, that were burned to death in front of the Hotel de Ville in 1750 for being gay are memorialized with a stone that has been laid at the intersection of Rue Montorgueil and Rue Bachaumont, where the two were caught by police.

French diplomat and spy Chevalier d'Éon appeared publicly as a man for 49 years, while successfully infiltrating the court of Empress Elizabeth of Russia by presenting as a woman. For 33 years, from 1777 on, d'Éon dressed as a woman, identifying as female. The character of Chevalier d'Éon is popularized in Europe by the song Sans contrefaçon by French rockstar Mylène Farmer, referring also to the popular gay-icon Eva Kotchever, whose nickname was Queen of the 3rd sex, dressed as a man in New York at Eve's Hangout and in Paris at Le Dôme Café before World War II and was assassinated at Auschwitz;

=== French Revolution to World War II ===
The French Revolution decriminalized sodomy in 1791 and as a result increasingly robust queer cultures began to emerge in Paris in the late 18th and 19th centuries. They were allowed to continue on condition that they remain private and discreet. The booming economic expansion of the Belle Époque during the late nineteenth and early twentieth centuries brought Paris a reputation as the bohemian and erotic capital of the West, which allowed queer cultures in Paris to flourish. A network of still relatively underground venues for LGBT people emerged, including, salons, bars, cafes and bathhouses, particularly in the Montmartre and Les Halles. Gay men would also meet in the gardens by the Carrousel du Louvre, along the Champs Elysées, by the Bourse, and elsewhere.

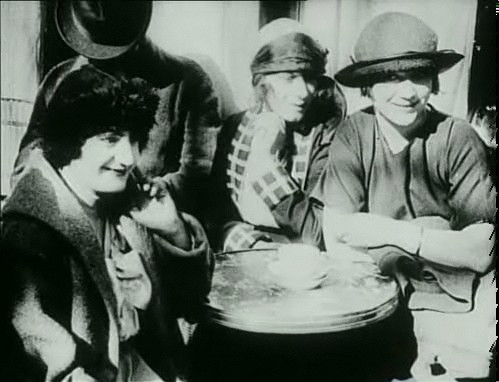
Natalie Barney,(l) pictured here with Janet Flanner and Djuna Barnes was one of several lesbians who hosted 20th century artistic salons in Paris

Lesbians and bisexual women in particular saw increased visibility during this period, both in the public sphere and in representations in art and literature. Fin de siècle society in Paris included bars, restaurants and cafes frequented and owned by lesbians, such as Le Hanneton ,La Souris, and le Rat Mort. Private salons in the early 20th century, like the ones hosted by the American expatriates Nathalie Barney, and Gertrude Stein drew LGBT and heterosexual artists and writers of the era, including Romaine Brooks, Renée Vivien, Colette, Djuna Barnes, André Gide, Pierre Louÿs, Truman Capote, and Radclyffe Hall. One of Barney's lovers, the courtesan Liane de Pougy, published a best-selling novel based on their romance called l’Idylle Saphique (1901). Many of the more visible lesbians and bisexual women were entertainers and actresses. Some, like the writer Colette and her lover Mathilde de Morny, performed lesbian theatrical scenes in Paris cabarets that drew outrage and censorship. Descriptions of lesbian salons, cafes and restaurants were included in tourist guides and journalism of the era, as well as mention of houses of prostitution that were uniquely for lesbians. Toulouse Lautrec portrayed Parisian lesbian and bisexual entertainers in many of his paintings, such as dancers Louise Weber, Jane Avril and May Milton, and the clown Cha-U-Kao

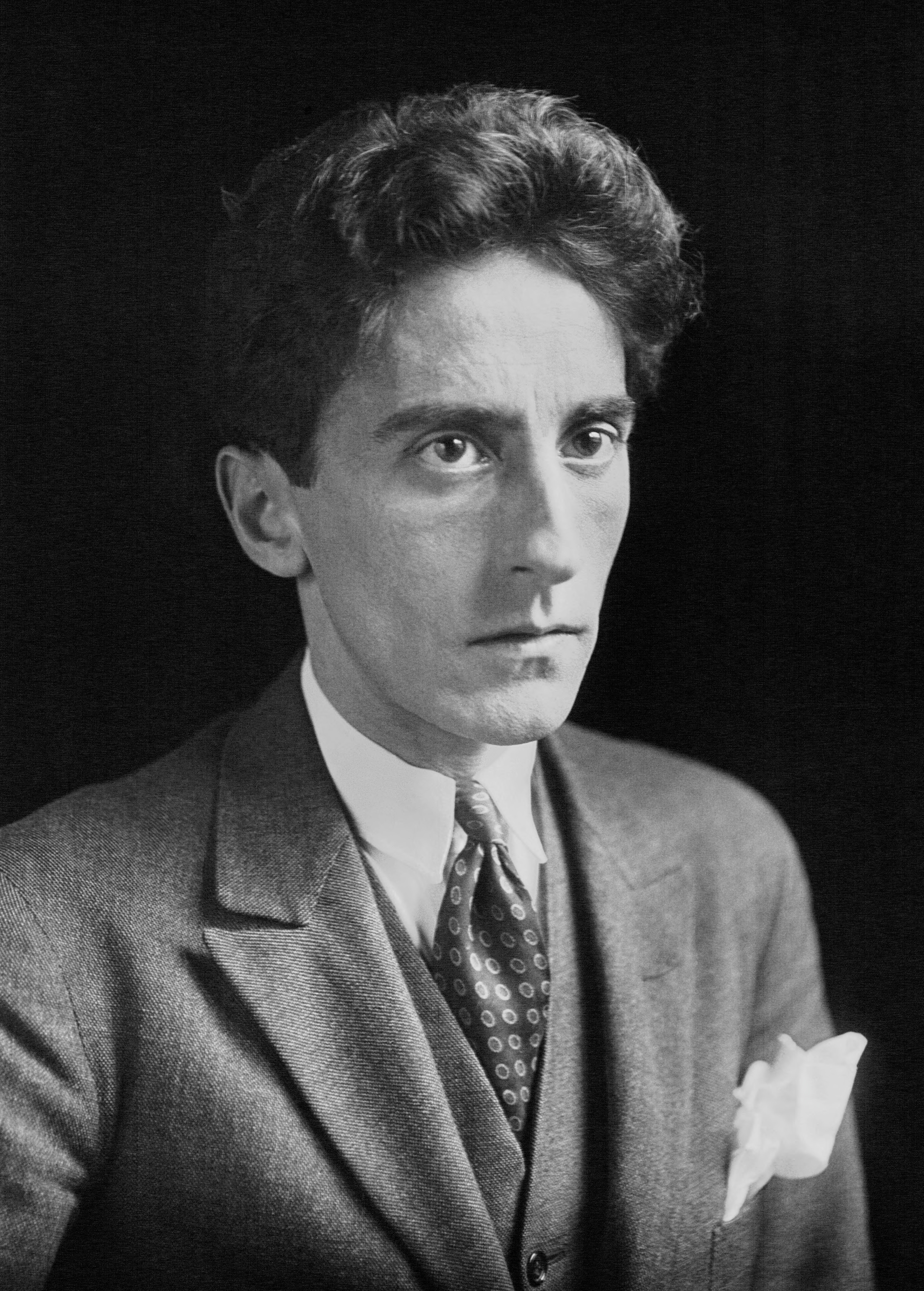
Writer and artist Jean Cocteau drew inspiration from his many relationships with men.

Tamagne stated that beginning in the 19th century Paris became known as a centre for LGBT culture. Foreign expats continued to be drawn to the more open society that existed in Paris. Oscar Wilde spent his last years in a hotel in Paris, where he befriended French author André Gide, who wrote openly about his own homosexuality. Celebrated French poet Paul Verlaine, who had had an intense relationship with poet Arthur Rimbaud, could be seen drinking absinthe in late 19th century Parisian cafes in his final years. Writer and artist Jean Cocteau, who drew inspiration from his many relationships with men, was an important member of the intellectual and artistic society of Paris in the early 20th century. Writer Marcel Proust has been described as homosexual by his biographers, but denied it during his lifetime, although his books often dealt with gay themes and characters.

Gay nightlife and drag balls flourished during the jazz age of the 1920s, with Le Monocle being a popular spot for women in tuxedos and Clair de Lune, Chez Ma Cousine, La Petite Chaumiere, and other clubs drawing men in male and female attire. Tamagne wrote that during the early 20th century Paris was seen as a "queer" capital, even though Amsterdam, Berlin, and London all had more meeting places and organizations than Paris; this was due to the "flamboyance" of LGBT quarters and "visibility" of LGBT celebrities. When the Nazis cracked down on Berlin in the 1930s, Paris became an even more important center for LGBT life. Tamagne stated that in the 1930s the LGBT populations socialized with migrant groups, some youth groups, criminal groups, and other groups who were "marginalized" in society.

=== World War II to present ===
During the Nazi occupation of France during World War II, the French government raised the age of sexual consent from 13 to 15 for heterosexuals, and to 21 for homosexuals. Penalties for the 'unnatural' practice of homosexual acts with minors were a fine and a prison term of six months to three years. This homosexual consent law was kept in place after the war, lowered to 18 in 1974 and to 15 in 1982.

According to Tamagne, Paris retained the LGBT capital image after the end of World War II. In the 1940s, Jean Genet, a vagabond, prostitute and petty criminal, published five autobiographical novels that were explicit in their depictions of homosexuality and criminality, and were celebrated by Cocteau, Jean-Paul Sartre, Picasso and others in the Parisian literary scene. Foreign LGBT artists and writers continued to seek the relative tolerance of France's capital city; James Baldwin's 1956 novel about homosexuality, Giovanni's Room, was based on time he had spent in Paris.

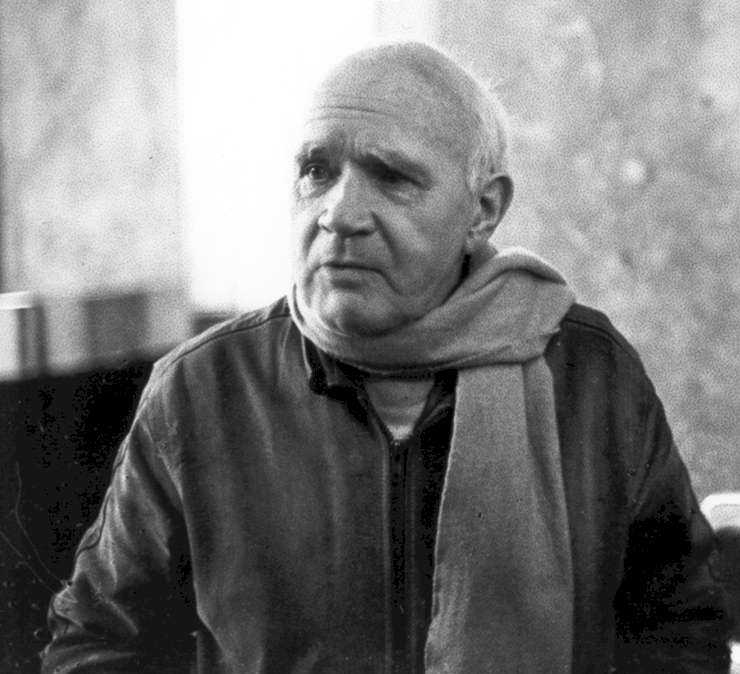
Jean Genet, whose novels featured homosexual themes, was widely acclaimed in the Parisian literary scene

In the 1950s and 1960s the police and authorities tolerated homosexuals as long as the conduct was private and out of view. The Arcadie Association, the first homophile organization in France, and a magazine by the same name, was established in Paris in 1954 by André Baudry, with assistance from Jean Cocteau and Roger Peyrefitte As a result, Baudry was prosecuted and fined for 'indecent morals' in 1955. In 1960, an indecent exposure law was introduced which caused more police harassment of gay men and women. In the 1960s, gay males received more harassment from police than lesbians. Between the years of 1953 and 1978 the annual numbers of women convicted of homosexuality ranged between one and twelve. Tamagne characterized this number as "relatively low". Drag performances used male-to-female transsexuals because the police did not allow cisgender males to perform in drag. Gay bar raids occurred during the 1950s and 1960s; there were occasions when the owners of the bars were involved in facilitating the raids. Many lesbians did not visit gay bars and instead socialized in circles of friends. Lesbians who did go to bars often originated from the working class; other women sometimes had internalized self-loathing and/or did not want to damage their reputations. Chez Moune, opened in 1936, and New Moon were 20th century lesbian cabarets located in Place Pigalle; both of them converted to mixed music clubs in the 21st century.

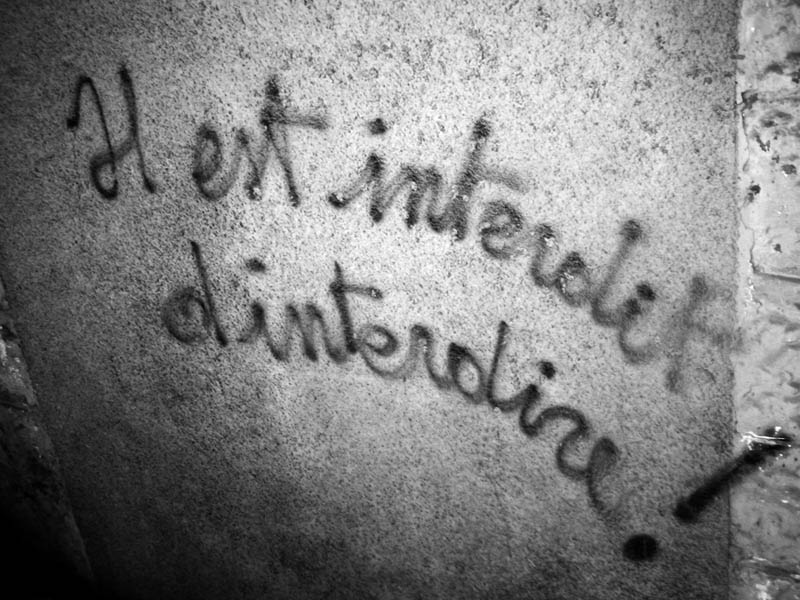
May 1968 slogan. Paris. "It is forbidden to forbid." The Homosexual Revolutionary Action Front was created after the ferment of May 68

Following the student and worker uprisings of May, 1968, and the rise of feminism, some Parisian LGBT residents became more radicalized in their approach, resulting in the 1971 creation of the Front homosexuel d'action révolutionnaire (Homosexual Revolutionary Action Front). Historian Julian Jackson defined the creation of this group as the "Stonewall" of French LGBT history, when activists developed a view of the world "In opposition to what had gone on before." Some lesbians, including author Monique Wittig, eventually broke away from Le Front to form Les Gouines Rouges, the Red Dykes.

By the 1970s police files on gays and lesbians were destroyed, and many laws against LGBT conduct and people were repealed.

The rise of AIDS brought another wave of French LGBT activism to Paris in the late 1980s and early 90s, though historians have noted that traditional French universalism has sometimes conflicted with American style "identity politics" in French LGBT political movements.

When marriage was legalized for French LGBT couples in 2013, it was met with hostility by some Parisians. An anti-gay marriage demonstration occurred in the Esplanade des Invalides that same year. However, 2013 polls have indicated that a majority of the French support same-sex marriage and another poll indicated that 77% of the French viewed that homosexuality should be accepted by society, one of the highest in the world.

== Geography ==
Le Marais, where areas are officially named in memory of LGBT leaders and events such as Harvey Milk Square, Mark Ashton Garden or Stonewall Riots Square, is the current gayborhood of Paris but in the early 20th century, Montmartre and Pigalle were meeting places of the LGBT community. Pigalle was also where Chez Moune, the "longest-running lesbian bar and cabaret in Paris", opened in 1937.

By the 1950s the meeting place shifted to Saint-Germain-des-Prés. For gay men, the Rue St. Anne was popular in the 1960s and 70s.

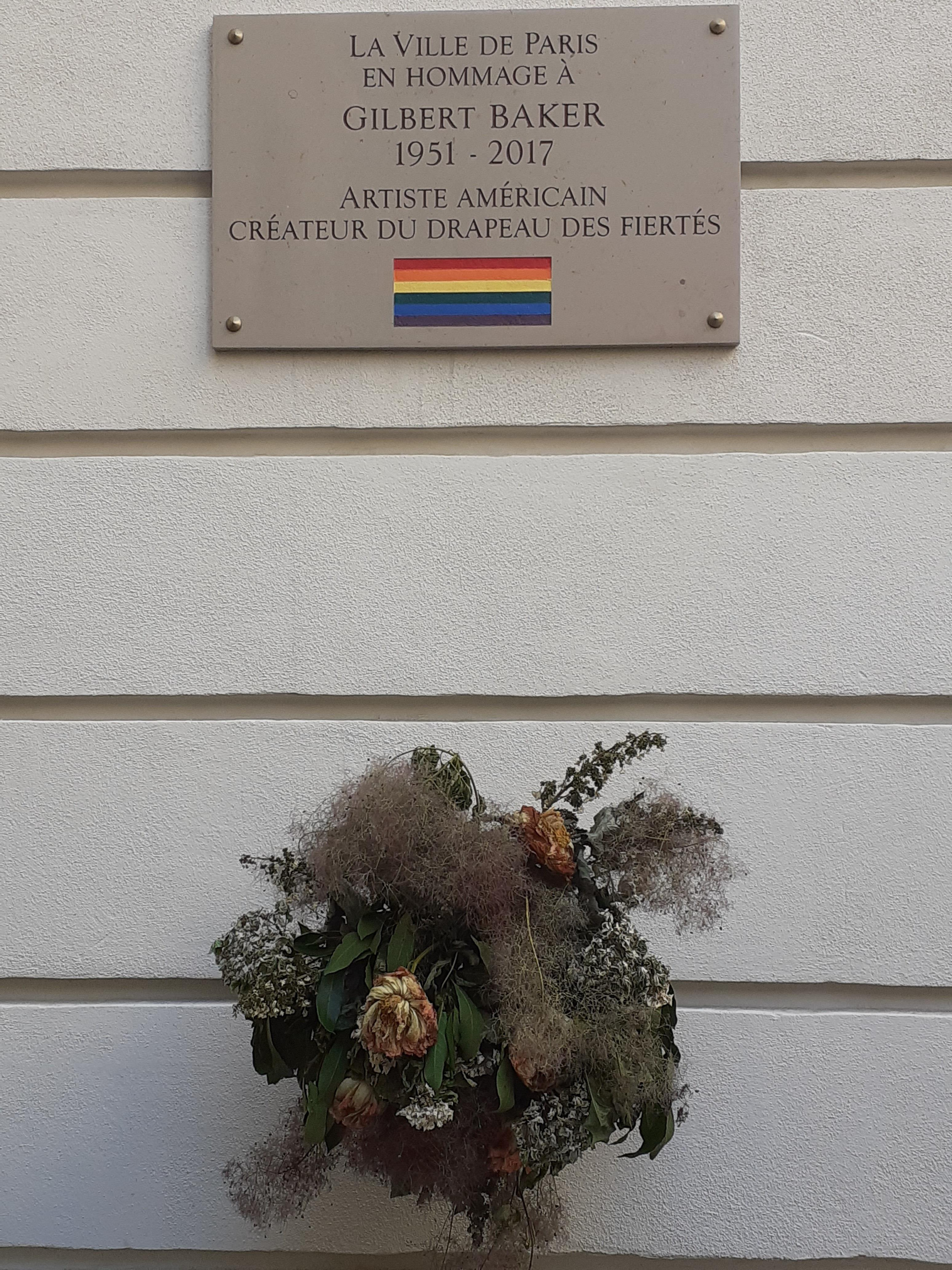
French official Memorial to Gilbert Baker, Place des Émeutes-de-Stonewall. Paris, Le Marais, France.

== Economy ==
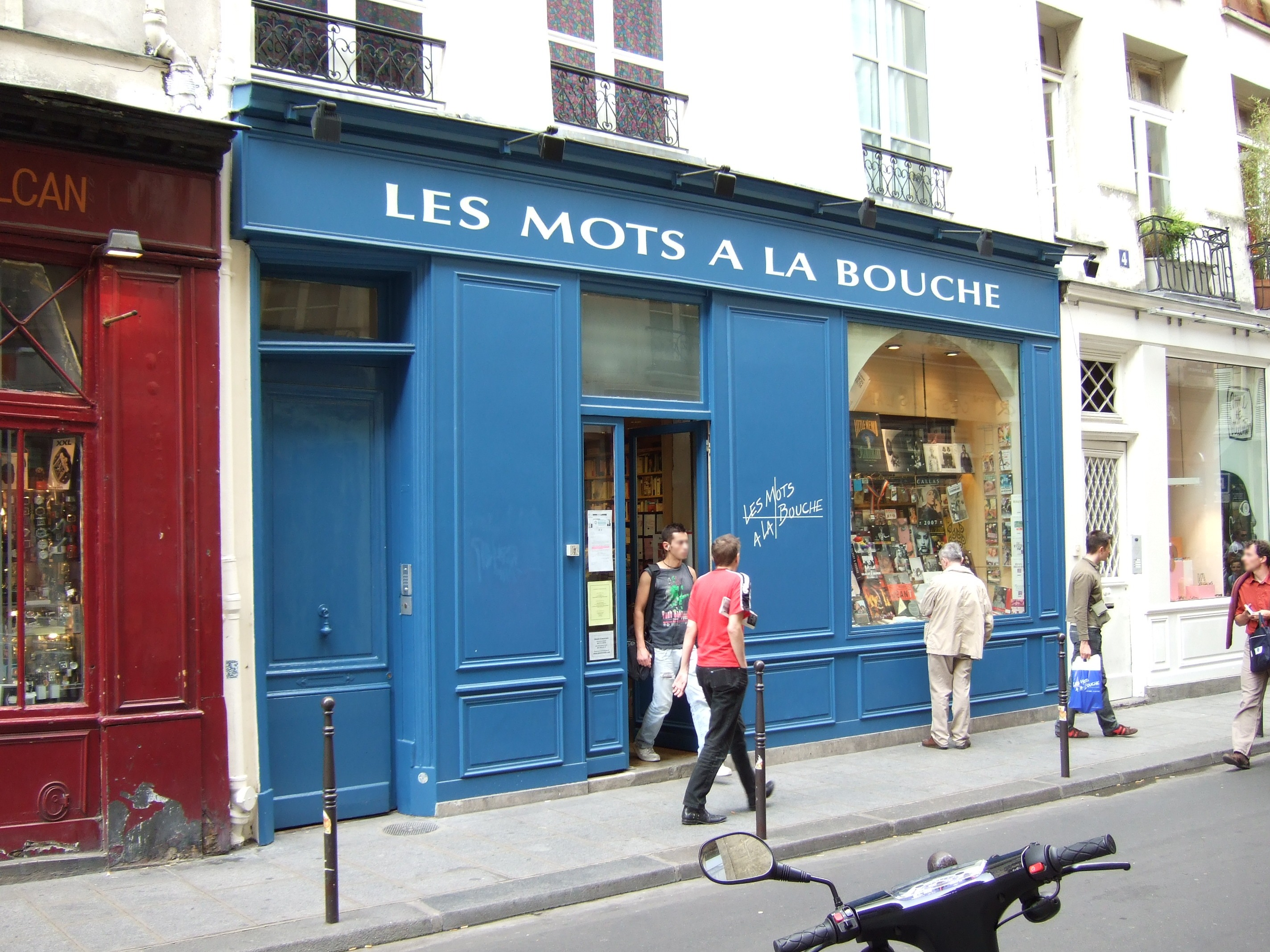
Les Mots à la Bouche

LGBT businesses in Paris include bars, clubs, restaurants, and shops. Stéphane Leroy stated that 70% of these businesses are in arrondissements one through four. Of the businesses in all of Paris, 40% are in Le Marais.

Frommer's described Les Mots à la Bouche in the 4th arrondissement, which carries materials in French and English, as "Paris's largest, best-stocked gay bookstore".

== Media ==
The lesbian magazine La Dixième Muse and the gay male magazines Têtu and Préf are in Paris. These three magazines include English texts.

Historical publications include Juventus, which was published in 1959 from May to November, and Arcadie, which was published by the Arcadie organization.

== Politics ==
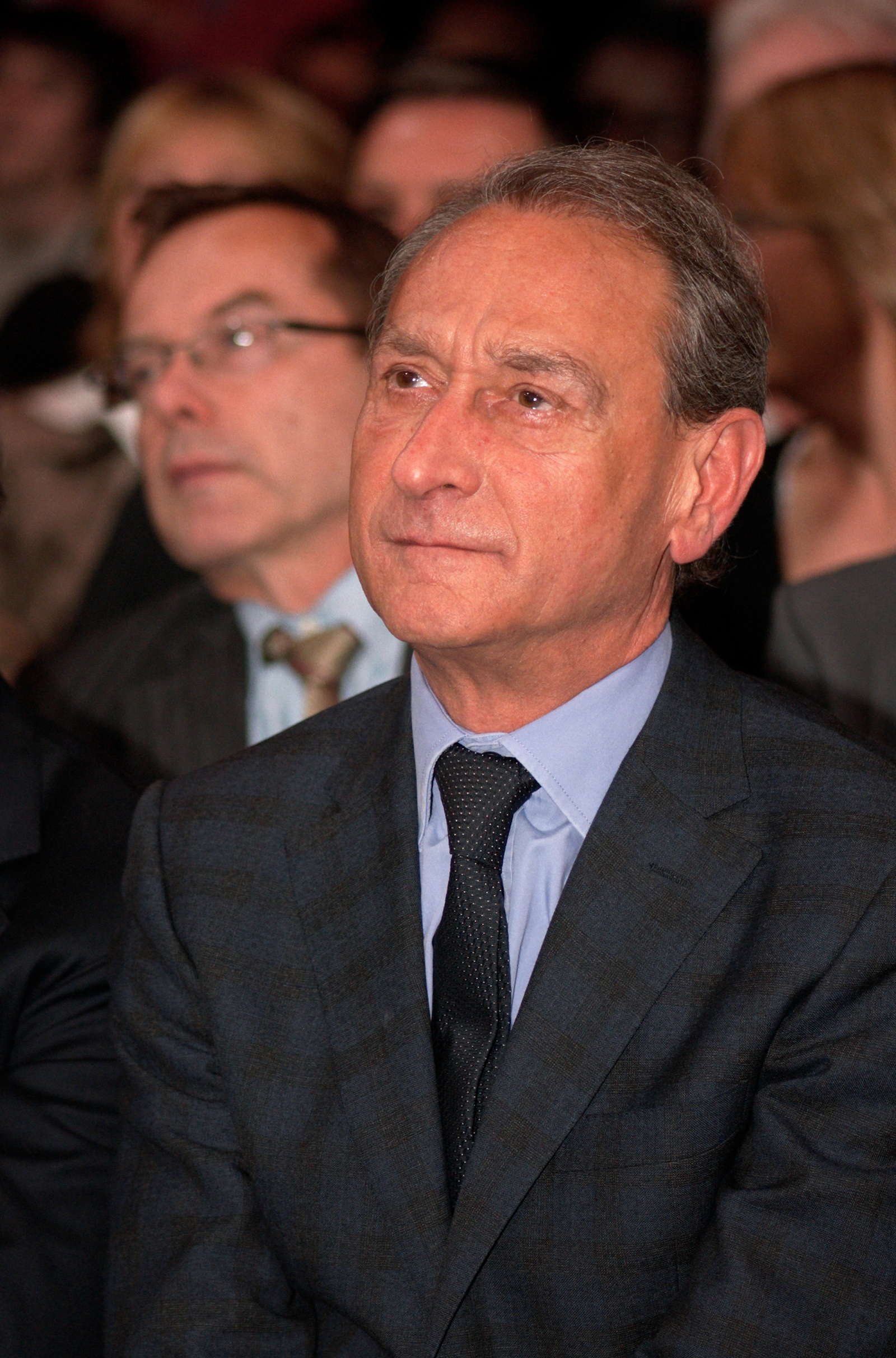
Bertrand Delanoë was the first openly gay mayor of Paris

Tamagne wrote that Paris "is not the trendiest LGBT city" and "cannot compare with cities like San Francisco, New York or Sydney, or even its nearer former rivals London and Berlin" in regards to nightlife and LGBT activism.

In October 1966 Coutrot, a socialist counselor, criticized LGBT persons for being open with their sexuality, stating that this was "shocking" the "honest citizens" and damaging Paris's international image, "notably regarding the tourists." In May of the following year Edouard Frédéric-Dupont, a conservative councillor, requested that the police increase levels of surveillance in an area bounded by boulevard Raspail and Saint-Germain-de-Pres square. The police complied with his request and arrests resulted.

In 2002, Socialist Bertrand Delanoë became the first openly gay man to be elected mayor of Paris. He was stabbed the same year during the Nuit Blanche, a night of festivities in Paris, while mingling with the public. His assailant told police that "he hated politicians, the Socialist Party, and homosexuals."

== Recreation ==
Paris Pride or La Marche des Fiértes LGBT de Paris is the gay pride parade in Paris.

== Religion ==
In 2012 Ludovic-Mohamed Zahed, who originated from Algeria, stated that he wished to open a mosque in Paris that was LGBT friendly. He planned to open the mosque in an undisclosed Buddhist temple in the east side of Paris. The mosque opened in 2012. This mosque also aimed to welcome transgender and transsexual individuals. The director of the Grand Mosque of Paris, Dalil Boubakeur, stated that it is not possible to have an LGBT-friendly mosque that follows the rules of Islam.

LGBT-affirming churches in Paris that perform same-sex marriages include the American Cathedral and the United Protestant Church of France. Additionally, the Church of St. Eustache is known for its openness towards LGBT people.

Beit Haverim was established in 1977 for Jewish LGBTQ+ people and their friends.

The Rainbow Sangha holds LGBTQ-friendly Buddhist meetings in Paris.

== Notable residents ==
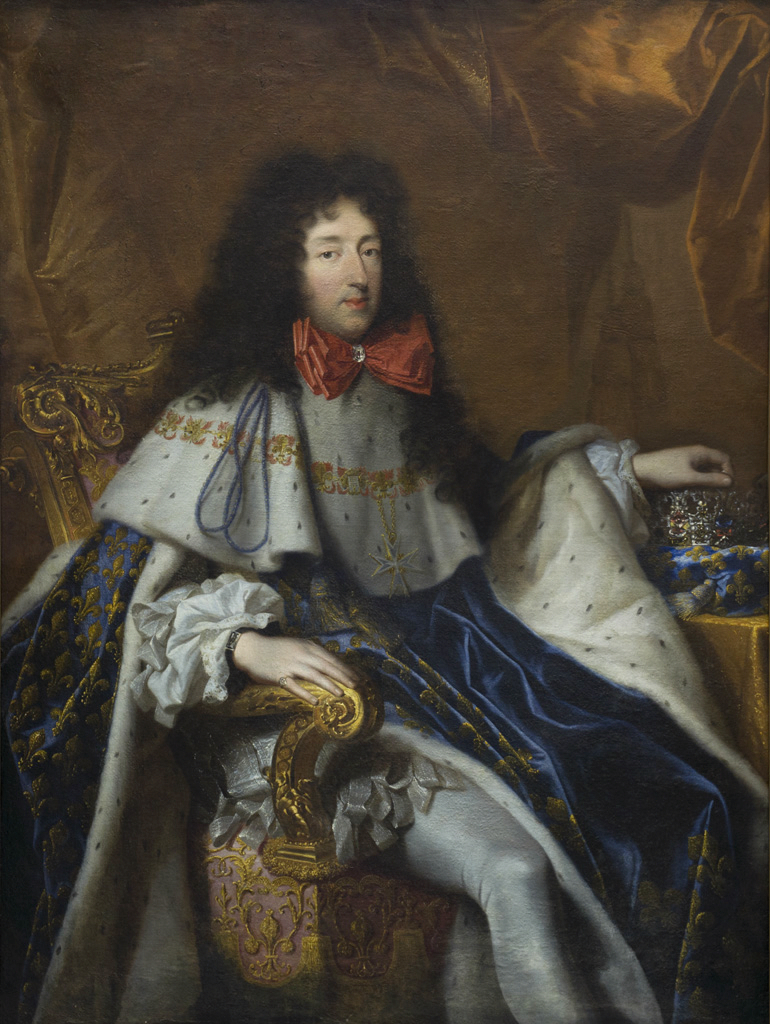
Philippe of France, Duke of Orléans

=== 17th century ===
- Philippe I, Duke of Orléans
- Louis Joseph de Bourbon, Duke of Vendôme

=== 18th century ===
- Henri-Lambert de Thibouville, writer, wit and correspondent to Voltaire
- Mlle Raucourt, actress who scandalized Paris with her affairs with women
- Chevalier d'Éon, transgender diplomat and spy
- Charles, marquis de Villette, writer, politician, revolutionary, friend of Voltaire

=== 19th century ===
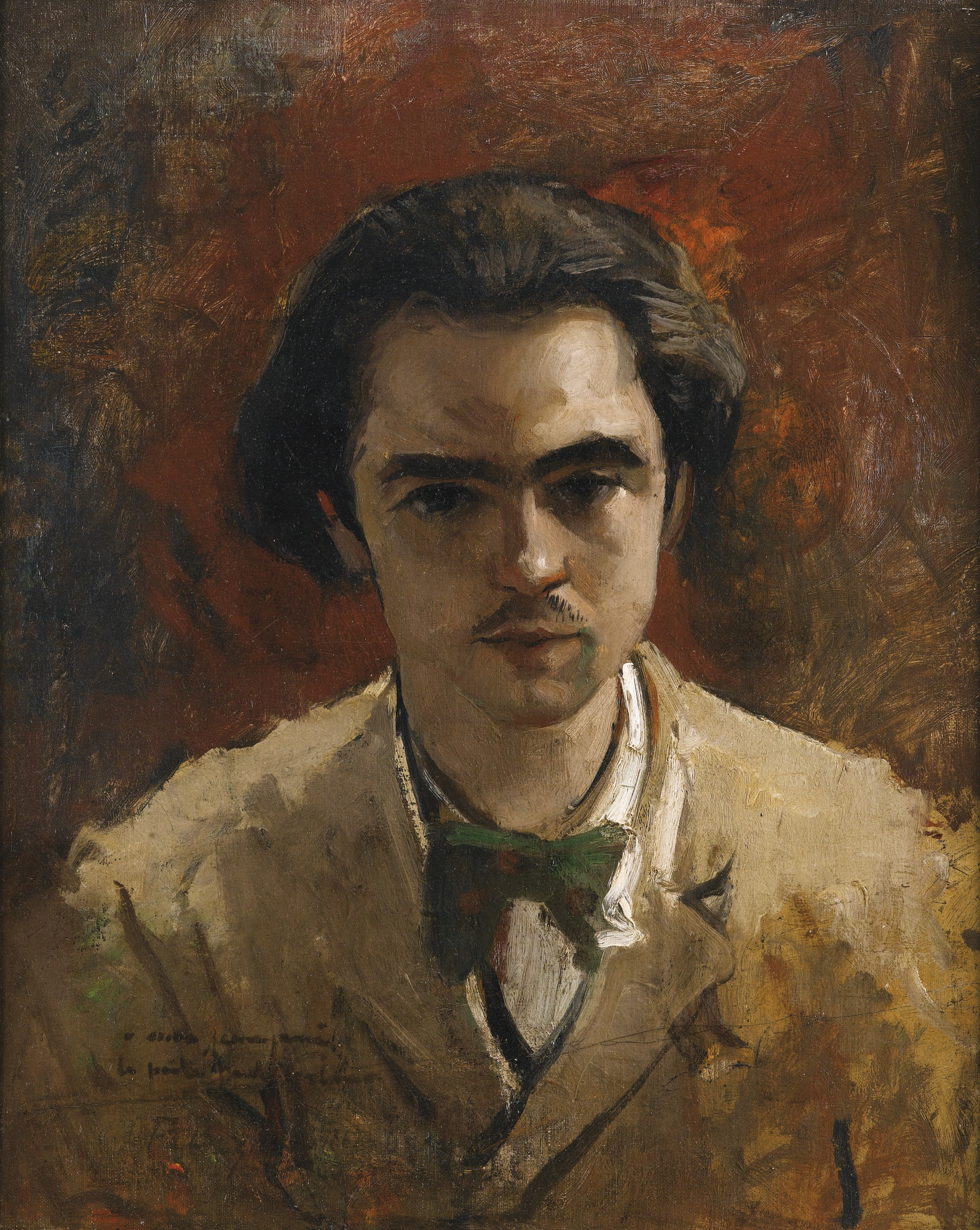
Painting of poet Paul Verlaine by Frédéric Bazille

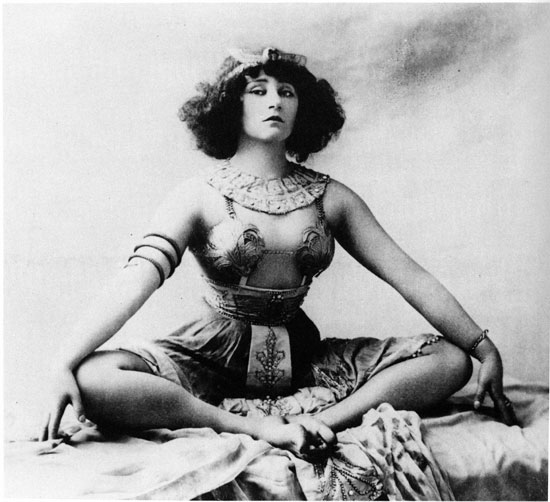
Colette's 1907 cabaret performance with her lover Mathilde de Morny in Rève d'Égypte was censored in Paris

- The Countess, transgender courtesan and singer
- Liane de Pougy, 19th century writer and courtesan
- Paul Verlaine, 19th century poet
- Oscar Wilde, 19th century English writer, spent his last days at the Hotel d'Alsace.

=== 20th century ===
- Berenice Abbott, photographer
- Azzedine Alaïa, fashion designer
- Marie-Thérèse Auffray, painter and member of the French resistance
- Natalie Barney, expatriate writer, held a salon at 20 Rue Jacob.
- Josephine Baker, 1920s American jazz singer, became a French citizen
- James Baldwin, American author whose novel Giovanni's Room is set in Paris
- Djuna Barnes, American writer who lived in Paris in the 1920s
- Roland Barthes, philosopher
- André Baudry, seminarian, philosophy professor, homophile activist
- Sylvia Beach, owner of the bookstore Shakespeare and Co, and publisher of Ulysses
- Paul Bowles, writer
- Louise Catherine Breslau, painter, and her partner Madeleine Zillhardt, writer
- Romaine Brooks, painter
- Bernard Buffet, painter
- Simone de Beauvoir, writer, feminist and scholar, partner of Jean-Paul Sartre
- Claude Cahun and Marcel Moore, artists and members of the French resistance
- Marcel Carné, filmmaker
- Jean Cocteau writer and artist
- Jean-Pierre Coffe, television presenter
- Colette, novelist
- Coccinelle, actress and cabaret artist
- Françoise d'Eaubonne, activist and writer
- Fabrice Emaer, nightclub impresario, known as "Prince of the Night"
- Michel Foucault, philosopher
- Loie Fuller, actress and dancer
- Jean-Paul Gaultier, fashion designer
- Jean Genet, 20th century writer, prisoner, and activist
- Allen Ginsberg Beat generation poet who shared a hotel in the Left Bank with other poets in the 1950s
- André Gide, writer
- Hervé Guibert, writer and photographer
- Reynaldo Hahn, composer, lover of Marcel Proust
- Bernard-Marie Koltès, dramatist
- Eva Kotchever, owner of the Eve's Hangout in New York, whose refuge was Paris before her murder at Auschwitz.
- Violette Leduc, author whose work was censored in the 1950s because of explicit lesbian passages
- Françoise Mallet-Joris, writer
- Adrienne Monnier, editor and writer
- Mathilde de Morny, artist, transgender partner of Colette
- Michou, cabaret artist and entertainer
- Charles de Noailles, nobleman whose wife replied when asked if he liked men or women, "He likes flowers."
- Madeleine Pelletier, feminist, physician and psychiatrist
- Roger Peyrefitte, 20th century writer and activist who was once called "The Pope of Homosexuals".
- Marcel Proust, writer
- Yves St. Laurent, fashion designer
- Susan Sontag, writer
- Gertrude Stein, writer
- Édith Thomas, novelist, journalist and member of the French resistance
- Alice B. Toklas, partner of Gertrude Stein
- Rose Valland, art historian and member of the French Resistance, captain in the French military,
- Renée Vivien, writer
- Monique Wittig, feminist author
- Hélène van Zuylen, Baroness, international motor racer, lover of Renee Vivien

=== 21st century ===
- Pierre Bergé, activist, business and life partner of Yves St. Laurent
- Bertrand Delanoë (former Mayor of Paris)
- Caroline Fourest, writer, President of Gay and Lesbian Center
- Énora Malagré, columnist and media presenter
- Ludovic-Mohamed Zahed, imam
- Thierry Schaffauser activist and actor
- Guillaume Dustan, writer
- Virginie Despentes, writer
- Alice Coffin, activist and member of La Barbe

== See also ==
- Drag in France
- LGBT rights in France
- LGBT history in France
