= Chez Moune =

Parisian nightclub

Coordinates: 48°52′52″N 2°20′10″E

Chez Moune is a Parisian nightclub that originally opened as Le Fetiche in 1936 in the Place Pigalle. It has been described as the first lesbian club with dancing and cabaret in Europe. Since the late 1980s, it has been a nightclub for mixed clientele.

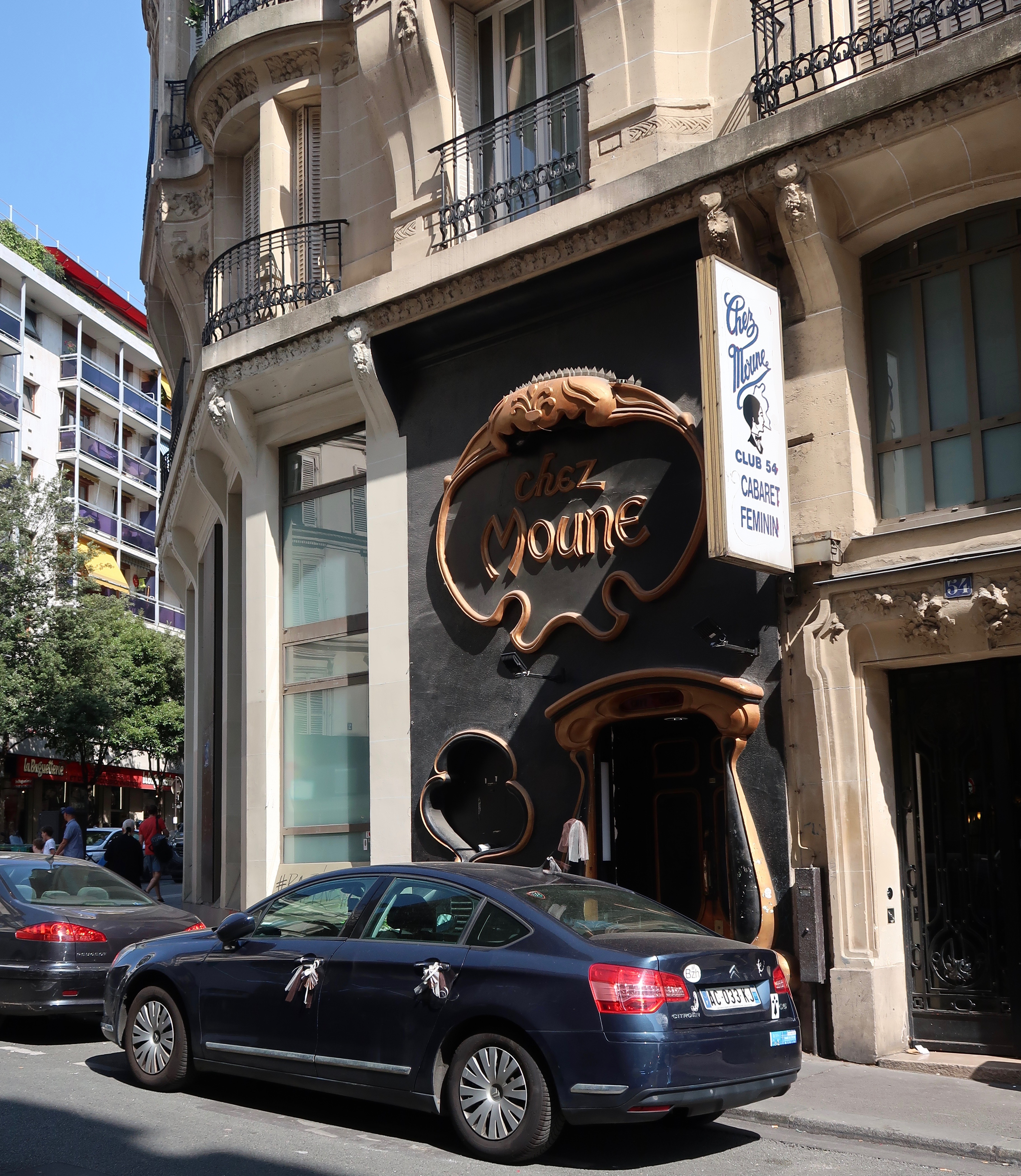
Chez Moune, 54 rue Jean-Baptiste-Pigalle, Paris 9e

== History ==
The club was opened by Monique "Moune" Carton in Paris's Pigalle District in 1936. Carton was described as " a tough woman" with a "strong personality" who wore short hair, a man's suit, large rings and nail polish. "She wasn't very smiley, and she demanded respect...but she was a lively person who knew how to entertain and always had a kind word for everyone."

It was originally on Rue Florentine and called Le Fetiche. ("The Fetish"). At the time, Pigalle was known as Paris' red light district, with lots of houses of prostitution for men, but no place for women who were attracted to women to congregate. It was the first overtly lesbian club in Europe that also had dancing and cabaret, offering striptease performers on Saturday nights and 'tea dances" on Sunday afternoons, when tango was a popular dance. Other entertainers included magicians, jazz singers, a women's orchestra, dancers and ventriloquists. Edith Piaf, Suzy Solidor, and later, Nicoletta and Chantal Goya were said to have performed at the club. The female clientele wore suits and ties or evening dresses. The club stayed open during the German occupation of France, with German soldiers replacing the usual doormen.

In the 1950s, Carton moved the club to 54 Rue Pigalle, and changed its name to Chez Moune, since by then she was a well- known figure in Place Pigalle. She spent her evenings in the club drinking and chatting with her lesbian clients, who saw the place as "a protective cocoon where judgments and shame didn't cross the doorstep, a haven for all those women who hid their sexuality the rest of the time."

Since homosexual bars were illegal, Carton always invited a few hand-picked male acquaintances and let the women clients know about the secret entrance at the back of the club where they could escape if the police arrived. Men were allowed in during the week because Carton knew they could bring in more income than women, but the Sunday tea dances were exclusively female.

Carton lost ownership of the club due to gambling debts, but she continued to manage it until her death in 1986. Afterwards, new owners kept its original name but opened its doors to a mixed clientele.

== 21st century and legacy ==
Under its new ownership, Chez Moune has been a music club for patrons of all sexual orientations, but it has kept the original sign that was put over the door by Monique "Madame Moune" Carton.

In a 21st-century interview with owners of the club, one said they deliberately kept some aspects of the 'old style' of the club's interior to pay tribute to Monique Carton and the Paris of her time.

"It profoundly changed the face of Pigalle and advanced the history of female homosexuality," said one writer about the legacy of the club.

== See also ==
- New Moon
- Le Monocle (lesbian bar)
- Le Hanneton (lesbian bar)
- LGBT culture in Paris
