= Palmire Dumont =

French gay bar manager (1855–1915)

Madame Palmyre
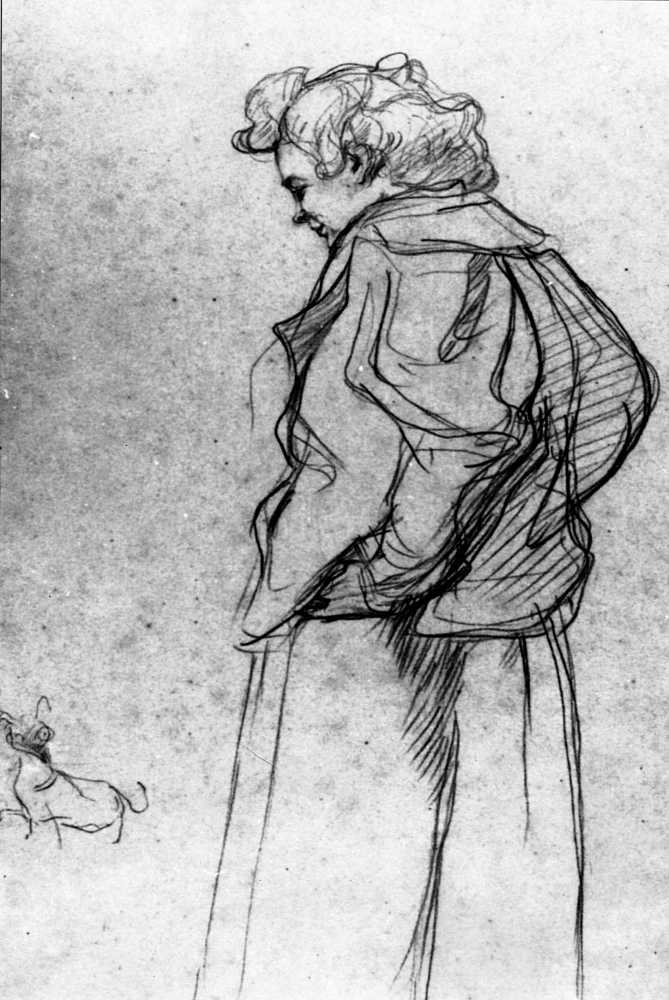
- Madame Palmyre and Her Dog, Henri de Toulouse-Lautrec, 1897
- Born: Palmire Louise Dumont; 4 March 1855; Béthune, France
- Died: 4 February 1915 (aged 59); Paris, France
- Other name: Palmyre Dumont
- Occupations: Spinner; bar manager

Palmire Louise Dumont (4 March 1855 – 4 February 1915), generally known as Madame Palmyre or Palmyre, was the manager and owner of two early gay bars in Paris in the 1890s–1900s: the lesbian bar La Souris (The Mouse) and the mixed Palmyr's Bar. She was an iconic figure in creating the culture of "gay Paree" in Montmartre during the Belle Époque.

Dumont was born in Béthune to a working-class family with long ties to the brewing industry. They moved to Lille, where she worked in a textile mill until she was around twenty-two years old. After leaving the mill, she may have been a sex worker before moving to Paris around 1880, where she began to manage restaurants and bars. Her first establishment was reportedly near the Place de l'Opéra. Around 1897, Dumont took over management of La Souris, turning it into one of the most famous clubs for lesbians and wealthy patrons. In 1909, she opened Palmyr's Bar across the street from the Moulin Rouge. The bar prospered and was expanded during her ownership.

Dumont and her French Bulldog became featured subjects in lithographs and sketches created by Henri de Toulouse-Lautrec in the 1890s. The two bars that she ran catered to gay and lesbian clients and were frequently discussed in court and police documents, as well as in literary publications and memoirs. As an entrepreneur, she hired entertainers and hosted events that not only provided entertainment and employment for members of the LGBT community, but also helped create tourism and commerce which benefited the Parisian economy. Dumont's work as an entrepreneur was instrumental in the social history of lesbian Montmartre, and her businesses are studied to understand the establishment and development of lesbian and gay businesses in modern Paris.

== Early life ==
Palmire Louise Dumont was born on 4 March 1855, in Béthune, France, the oldest child of Louis Dumont and Virginie (née Buissart). She came from a working-class background that included a long line of tavern keepers and brewers. She had family members on both sides of her family who were brewery workers, including her father. Her mother was a dressmaker, and both of her parents were able to sign their names. After 1865, the family relocated to Lille, as her sister Laurence Irma was born in 1865 in Béthune, but her other sister Adèle Julia was born in 1868 in Lille. Dumont began working in a spinning mill. She earned only 18 sous (a sou was 1/20th of a franc, or approximately the equivalent of 8 1/2 British pence) for a day's labor, and in later life remembered her poverty during this time. She left mill work in 1877; some literary sources indicate she may have been a sex worker for some time.

== Early career ==
By 1880, Dumont was living in Paris, as she became one of the first members of the French Bulldog-Owners Club, which was organized that year. Francis Carco in his book Montmartre à vingt ans (Montmartre at Twenty) noted that Dumont's first bar in Paris was situated on Rue Halévy near the Place de l'Opéra. (Note: Scholar Leslie Choquette was unable to locate real estate records to confirm the bar's existence, although she did find newspaper articles which confirmed that lesbian bars emerged near the Paris Opéra before they did in Montmartre.) Art critic Émile Schaub-Koch and poet Sylvain Bonmariage both wrote literary works describing a three-month drinking binge in 1888 which involved Dumont, the courtesan Lucy Jourdan, the artist Henri de Toulouse-Lautrec, and another friend, Armande Brazier (also known as Armande la Borgne), who would later operate the lesbian bar Le Hanneton (The June Bug) on Rue Pigalle. Other evidence that Toulouse-Lautrec and Dumont became acquainted early in her time in Paris comes from a portrait he made in 1892, which according to scholar Leslie Choquette may depict Dumont.

== La Souris ==
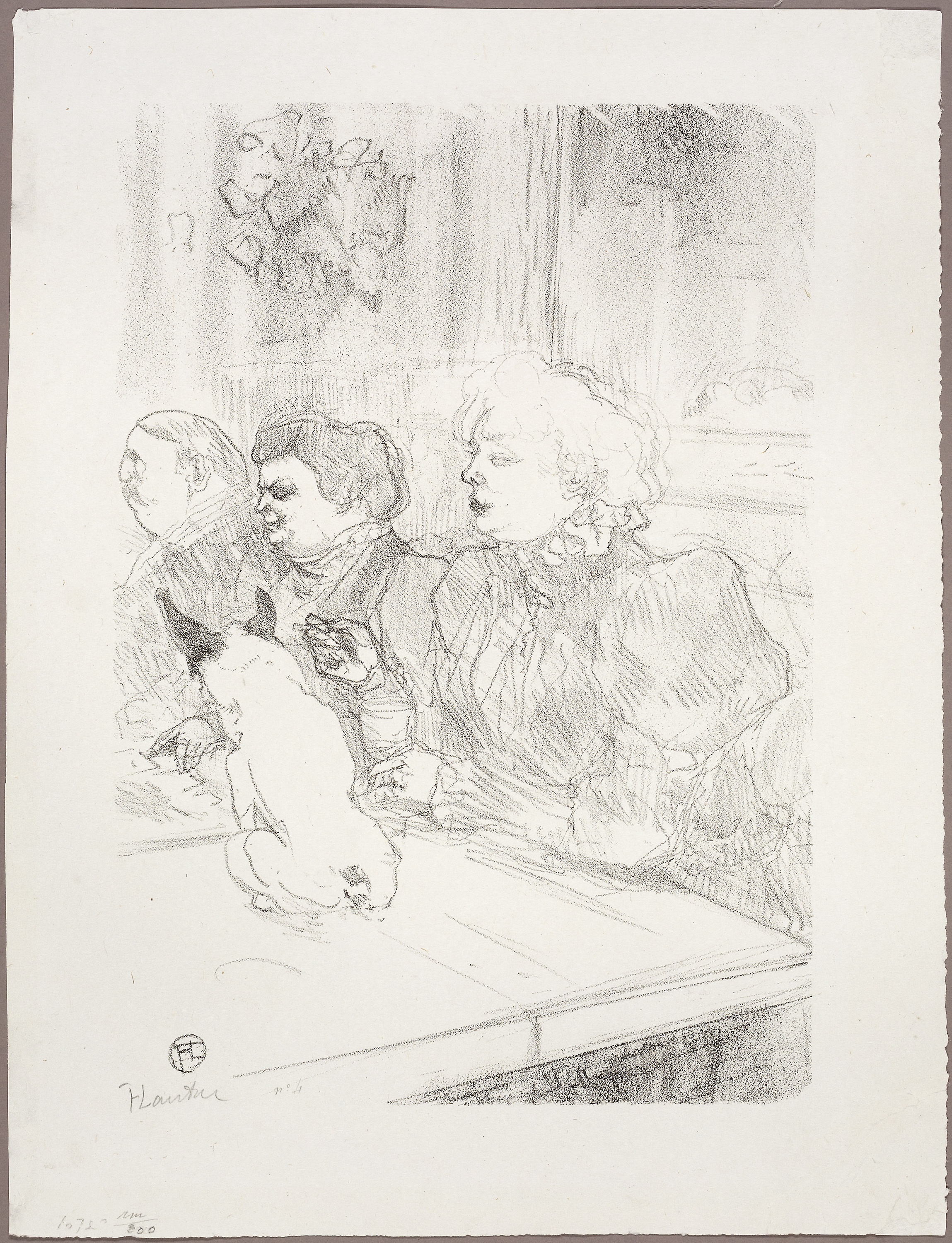
A la Souris, Madame Palmyre, by Toulouse-Lautrec, 1897

Homosexuality had been decriminalized in France since 1791 during the French Revolution, and a law of 1880 opened free trade to businesses selling alcohol. The loosening of restrictions resulted in a rise of business opportunities in the entertainment sector for gay and lesbian business owners at the end of the nineteenth century. Patrons of bars and entertainment venues could not be arrested for homosexual behavior, but they could and were targeted for public obscenity, corruption, solicitation, or failing to register as a prostitute with the state. Some brasseries (a type of restaurant that served simple food and alcoholic beverages, especially beer) also were involved in prostitution; in the Montmartre neighborhood, some were targeted at lesbian clients. One such establishment was La Souris (The Mouse), located at 29 Rue Bréda (later Rue Henri Monnier) in Pigalle. As early as 1890, it was known as a lesbian meeting place. Jules Davray and other writers noted that the clientele treated the establishment like it was their home and expressed themselves freely while there. The brasserie repeatedly had new management during the 1890s.

In January 1897, a man named Floquet together with Dumont (named as "Dame Dumont") as his manager rented La Souris when it was vacated by a man named Liot and his manager, Dame Delbès. (Note: According to Choquette, a police report filed in June 1897 noted that Dumont had been managing the space "since December 1896" and that she was "single, and had an adopted child".) The lease included the three-by-thirteen meter dining room, a kitchen, and an upstairs bedroom with a fireplace. Dumont, who was known by the name "Palmyre" or "Madame Palmyre", was rumored to be both a lesbian and the former mistress of Moïse Zekri, who would later become the proprietor of Maurice's Bar.

Unlike other lesbian establishments of the era like Le Hanneton, Dumont did not rely on advertising and La Souris was unmarked by any signage. Nevertheless, it became one of the preferred clubs for lesbians and wealthy patrons. She hosted meetings at La Souris for the French Bulldog-Owners Club, which included writers like Natalie Clifford Barney, Colette, and Renée Vivien, among others. By the turn of the century, the business was included in what was known as the Grand Dukes' Tour, a type of tourism that allowed affluent members of society to voyeuristically experience urban social spaces, observe and participate in sexual transgressions, and temporarily avoid social conventions that usually separated upper-class people from the poor. Guidebooks were issued by various publishing houses, giving the locations of establishments that catered to lesbians. Gerstle Mack, who wrote the first English-language biography of Toulouse-Lautrec, called La Souris "the most famous lesbian restaurant of the period".

=== Toulouse-Lautrec, Dumont, and Bouboule ===
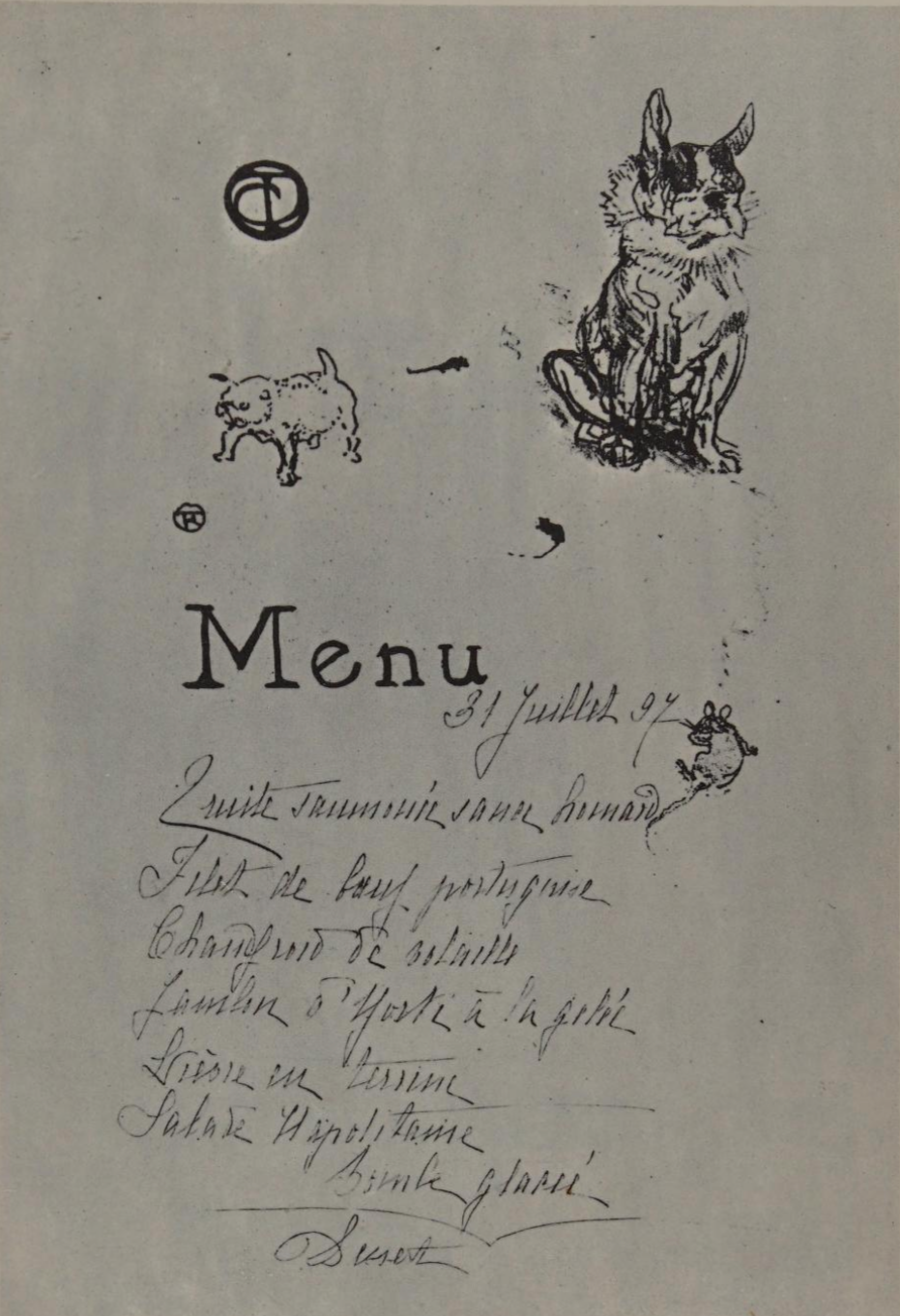
Menu for a dinner at La Souris on 31 July 1897, Toulouse-Lautrec

The painter Toulouse-Lautrec began visiting La Souris about the same time as Dumont became the manager. His drawings and sketches of Dumont, her bulldog Bouboule, and other clientele of the establishment, as well as his introduction of friends to the brasserie, propelled it into a gathering place for avant-garde artists and intellectuals. It was also frequented by prostitutes, kept women, performers, and patrons who wished to smoke, partake of morphine or ether, gamble, or watch the entertainment provided. From May 1897, Toulouse-Lautrec lived close by, in Avenue Frochot. He held a dinner party for his friends at La Souris on 31 July 1897. For the party, he created a lithograph of Bouboule (from a previous sketch) and some mice for the menu card. The lithograph was printed by Henri Stern and the menu added in handwriting. The dinner featured rainbow trout in lobster sauce, Portuguese beef fillet, chaudfroid of poultry, jellied York ham, hare terrine, and Neapolitan salad followed by bombe glacée and dessert.

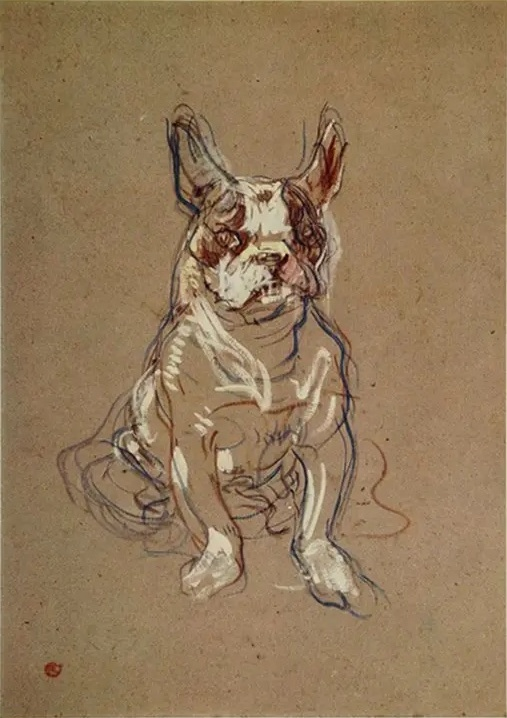
Dumont's bulldog Bouboule, by Toulouse-Lautrec, 1897

Bulldogs like Bouboule had first become fashionable among lesbians and gender non-conforming women in Paris, before the breed's popularity had grown among the upper classes. Bouboule was often described as undisciplined and unfriendly, biting or urinating on the feet of anyone who tried to pet him. Although Dumont tried to train the dog to behave better, Bouboule did not like her women clientele, but he was curious and was often depicted by Toulouse-Lautrec as a prying observer of their actions. As a regular customer at La Souris (which he pronounced "La Touris"), Toulouse-Lautrec made various sketches there. In the holdings of the Musée Toulouse-Lautrec, in Albi, are numerous sketches and paintings of Bouboule. Among his works that feature Bouboule are Le Marchand de Marrons (1897, The Roast Chestnut Merchant), À La Souris: Madame Palmyre et son chien (1897, Madame Palmyre and Her Dog), and likely L'cheval et le chien à la pipe (1898, The Horse and the Dog with a Pipe), in the collection of Otto Gerstenberg.

A la Souris, Madame Palmyre (1897, Madame Palmyre at La Souris) featured Bouboule watching his owner playing cards, while seated at a table between a blond patron and Dumont's assistant, Émile Brunswick. The image is used again in Conversation (1899). Another work by Toulouse-Lautrec featuring Dumont is À La Souris: Portrait de face de Madame Palmyre (1897, Full-face Portrait of Madame Palmyre at La Souris).

=== Assault incident and new management ===
In June 1897, women in the bar were attacked by several men—described in official records as pimps—who were upset that the bar was off-limits to them. After a brawl ensued, Dumont called in the police, who arrested Manuel Louise and Auguste Robbe, charging them with assault. The police and courts sided with the women. For the most part, police left lesbians alone unless they were performing publicly; Colette was once arrested for a kiss onstage with her lover Mathilde de Morny, the Marquise de Belbeuf, known as Missy. Choquette acknowledged the possibility that Palmyre paid the police protection money. Although the brasserie was successful, Dumont left La Souris in 1900, and she had two run-ins with the law shortly thereafter. She was arrested in February for interfering with a policeman and fined. She was also arrested in May for assault on another woman, but the charges were dismissed because of insufficient evidence. The business was continued by Louise Jost, who formerly had worked at Le Hanneton, and who managed La Souris until 1916.

== Palmyr's Bar ==
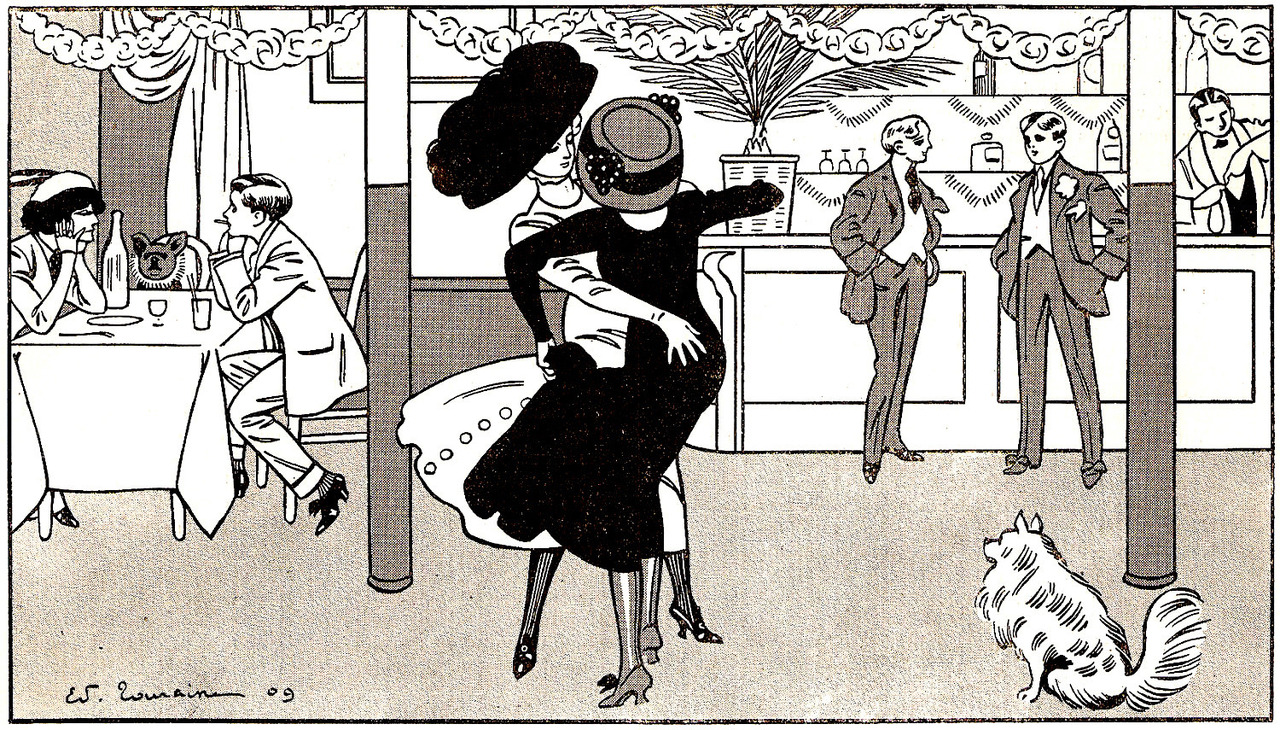
Le Sémiramis-Bar, (pseudonymous name of Palmyr's Bar), illustration by Édouard Touraine for a text by Colette

In 1909, Dumont opened her own establishment, Palmyr's Bar, purposely Anglifiying the name. It was located across the street from the Moulin Rouge, which had opened two decades earlier and helped solidify the area as an entertainment center. She signed a ten-year lease for the space located at 5 Place Blanche with partners Albert and Marcel Verdier, brothers whose parents were restaurateurs. The bar was modeled after a recently closed gay men's nightclub called Maurice's Bar, and it had a doorman. Catering to both gay men and lesbians, Dumont purposely reached out to queer women like Colette and her partner Missy, as well as actors and singers like Louise Balthy, Édouard de Max, and Véra Sergine, and writers like Jacques d'Adelswärd-Fersen. As had occurred in her previous location, many of her patrons were involved in the drug and sex trades, and she did not advertise. Colette described the menu choices as chicken with sausage, leek soup, and veal loin and the clientele as men who wore long hair and women with short hair styles. The bar's entertainers, Georges Giguet, who performed as Bobette, and Lucien Kotheé, who performed as Lucienne, sang blue comedic songs and borrowed women's accessories from audience members to perform the can-can. Other performers at the bar included Otéro, a dark-skinned Spanish dancer who also performed with Giguet in similarly obscene sketches. "The Sentimental Heresy", an article published in 1909 in Fantasio, also stated that Colette and Missy performed there.

=== Literary depictions ===
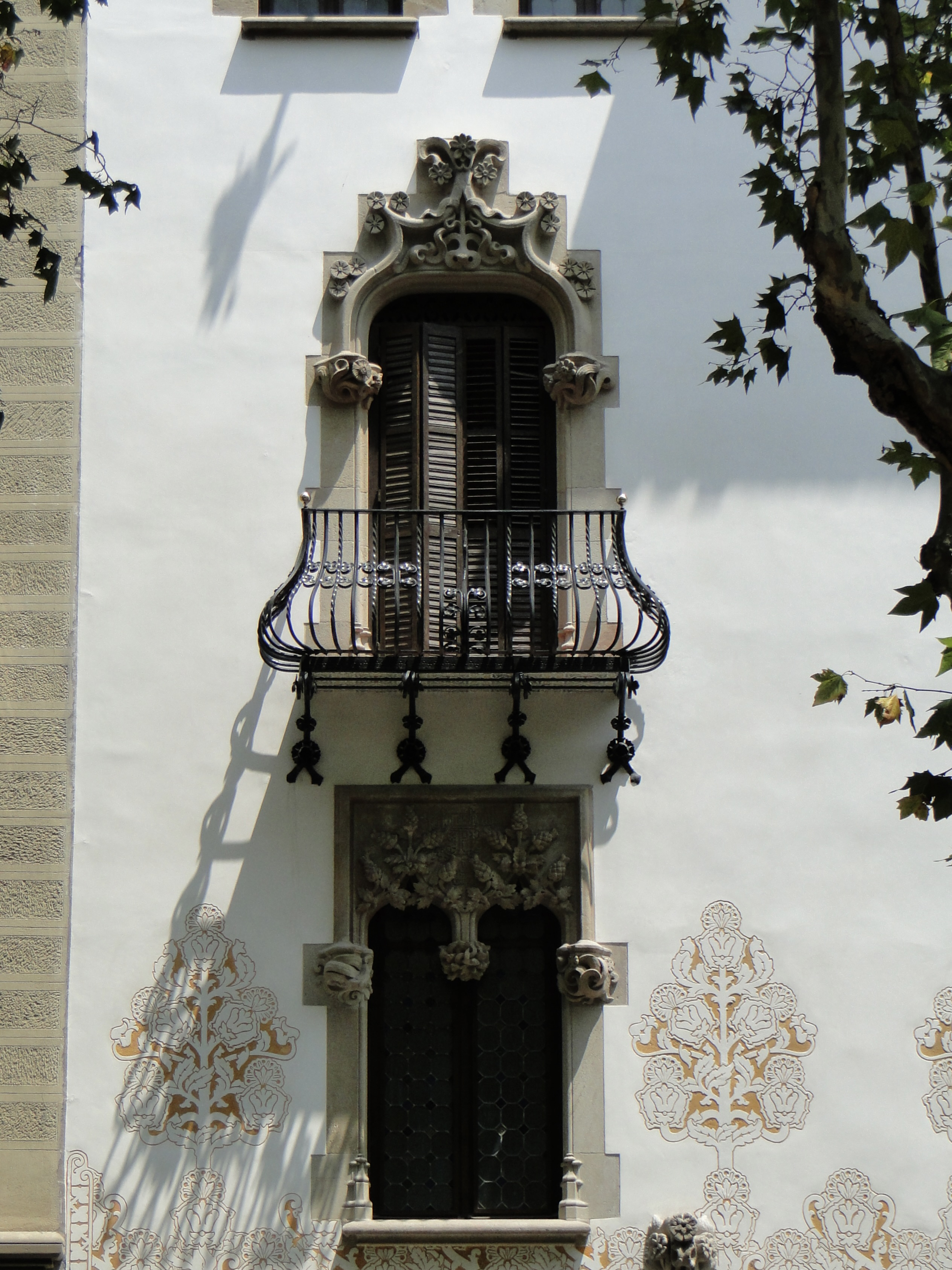
Spanish colonial balcony, Barcelona

Colette, who frequented the bar with Missy, described Dumont as motherly, showering them with presents, cooking their favorite foods, and showing off her bulldog puppies with exceeding pride. She wrote in "Sémiramis Bar", published in March 1909 in La Vie Parisienne, a thinly veiled description of Dumont saying that the proprietor resembled a bulldog, wore her red hair fashioned into a bump just above the forehead with a chignon in the back, and had a chest like a Spanish balcony. She also described Dumont as gruff, but generous. Dancer Jane Avril and other observers described Dumont as talkative but with an impudent and sharp wit. Paul Leclercq noted that while Dumont looked like her dog and always seemed ready to bite, in actuality, she was "exceedingly kindhearted", and others said she had a "heart of gold".

Writer and critic David Sweetman believed that Émile Zola based his character Laure Piedefer in his novel Nana on Dumont; however, scholars Choquette and Nicole G. Albert concluded from looking at Zola's notes that Nana described Louise Taillandier and her bar on Rue des Martyrs. Colette's letters contained references to Dumont, and in addition to the article published in La Vie Parisienne, she included descriptions of Dumont and La Souris in her novel La Vagabonde (1910, The Vagabond) and several short stories. The character of Zénobie in Lélie, fumeuse d'opium: roman (1911, Lélie, Opium Smoker: A Novel), written by the pseudonymous author Willy, was based on her. (Note: "Willy" was a pseudonym used by Henry Gauthier-Villars, Colette's husband, who used a variety of ghostwriters. Choquette identifies the writer of Lélie as possibly Curnonsky or Paul-Jean Toulet. Author Judith Thurman believed the writer was Toulet.) She and Giguet were both discussed in the memoir Chez de Max (1918, At Max's) by Louis Delluc. The character of Locuste in Michel Georges-Michel's La Bohème canaille (1922, The Bohemian Scoundrel) was also based upon Dumont.

=== Police raid and notoriety ===
At a raid of the bar in June 1909, Albert Verdier was one of the people arrested and convicted of public indecency. He was sentenced to four months in prison, and the following year the Verdier brothers and Dumont's partnership was dissolved. In August 1910, she entered into a new ten-year partnership with Giguet. The bar prospered under the new partnership and was regularly described in popular culture as a center of vice. Business grew so much that Dumont hired her younger sister Adèle and a woman who was a rancher in Marcilly-sur-Eure to provision the restaurant. Although there were occasional complaints from neighbors or clients who were not regulars, the police generally dismissed them. The police did so on the basis that the behaviors at the bar reflected similar actions in other bars, and they noted that the owners were diligent in ensuring that criminal behavior was not occurring. When World War I began and Montmartre was forced to close its entertainment houses for security reasons, Dumont took advantage of her status as a restaurateur to expand the business into the pharmacy next door.

== Death and legacy ==
Dumont died on 4 February 1915 at her apartment located at 41 Rue de Douai in Paris. Choquette credits drug and alcohol use as contributing factors. Her sister Adèle inherited Dumont's half-interest in the bar as well as her personal effects. Among her jewelry was a ring with the initials S. B.; Choquette speculates that Dumont might have received it from actress Sarah Bernhardt. When Giguet was conscripted in May, the establishment closed for the duration of the war. He reopened the business as Liberty's Bar after the Armistice, bringing in a new partner when Adèle withdrew in 1923. The bar continued to operate until the 1960s.

Tracing Dumont's life and business development, according to Choquette, not only shows how gay and lesbian businesses were established and transformed Paris, but also how Montmartre became a lesbian center and the hub of what came to be known as "gay Paree". Dumont and those in her network pioneered the business model of "(homo)sexualized" night life and party venues. The establishments she operated allowed gays and lesbians to be visible and participate in their communities as both patrons and proprietors. By commercializing and commodifying the queer community, and encouraging tourism to partake in the bohemian pleasures offered in Montmartre, she helped propel that area of Paris to hold a central position as a capital of gay entertainment.

Numerous artists and illustrators flocked to Montmartre during the Belle Époque period to sketch the clientele, couples, owners of bars, and entertainment venues that catered to the growing night life industries. Besides numerous portraits of Dumont and Bouboule by Toulouse-Lautrec, George Bottini painted a watercolor Au Café (1899, The Cafe) of Dumont and Brunswick in the kitchen of La Souris. A la Souris, Madame Palmyre (At the Mouse, Madame Palmyre) has been exhibited worldwide and sold at an auction at Christie's in 2005 for 20 million dollars. Dumont, her bars, and other lesbian bars and owners in the era also became the subject of numerous literary works focused on themes of women's homosexuality or bisexuality. Albert stated that La Souris and Palmyr's Bar were important venues of queer life during the period, bringing lesbians in particular from invisibility into public space.

== See also ==
- LGBT culture in Paris
- Le Monocle, another Parisian lesbian bar
