= Le Hanneton =

Parisian lesbian bar 1890s-early 1900s

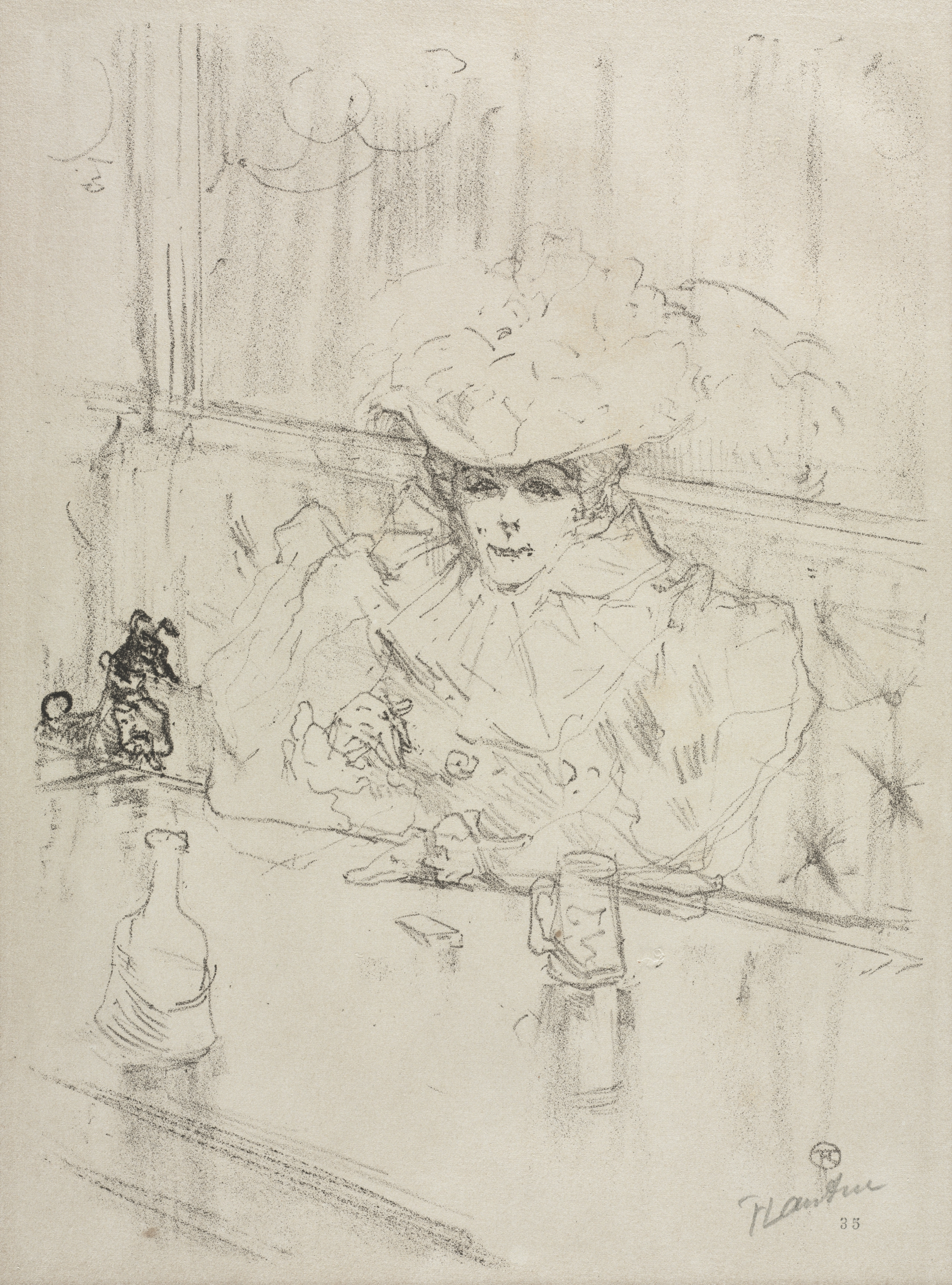
Henri de Toulouse-Lautrec - Au Hanneton - 1959.30 - Cleveland Museum of Art

Le Hanneton ("The June Bug") was a popular Parisian lesbian bar of the 1890s and early 1900s at 75 Rue Pigalle in the Montmartre district. It was owned and run by Madame Armande Brazier, who was the subject of a well-known lithograph by Toulouse Lautrec, Au Hanneton.

== History ==
The brasserie was one of several Belle Epoque establishments in the Montmartre District that catered to lesbians, including also La Souris and Le Rat Mort. It was opened in the 1890s by Madame Armande Brazier, an ex prostitute, who was also known as Amandine.

The female clients of Le Hanneton and Montmartre's other lesbian establishments were described by journalist Jean Lorain as a mix of young and old, of cabaret singers, painters' models, housewives, and affluent society women.

It was included in Parisian guidebooks of the era, as well as the "Grand Dukes" tour, an informal tour for affluent visitors who were curious about parisian nightlife.

The Guide des Plaisirs a Paris (1899) described the bar as a "pathological curiosity".

"The premises are small and low-ceilinged, with red curtains on the windows in a style reminiscent of brasseries managed by women. However, this brasserie is managed even more so for women...it is very rare that anyone of the virile sex is to be seen within its walls, while these 'emasculated women' eat in couples at the little tables, and then share a cigarette, before sharing even more."

== Depictions in Art and Literature ==
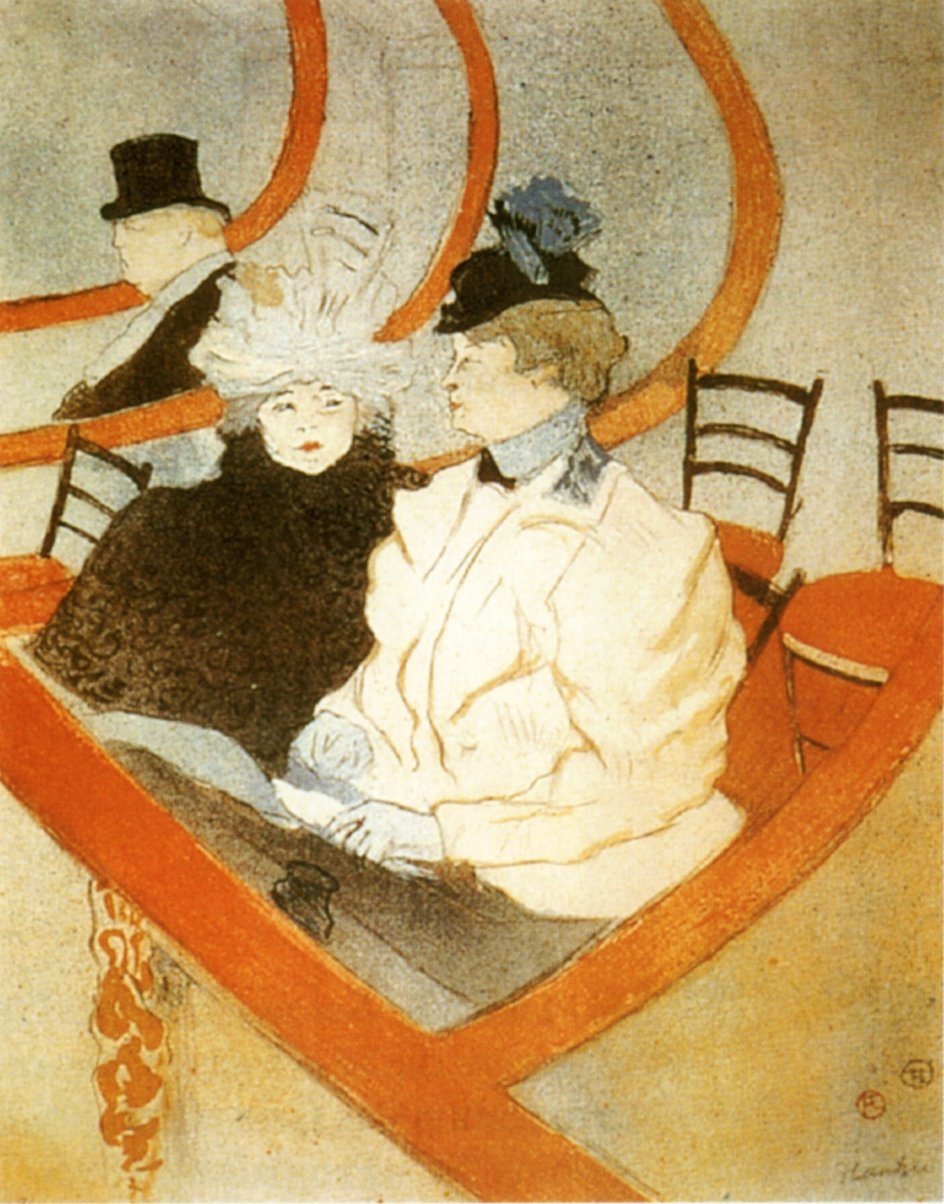
Lautrec a box at the theater (lith)

Even though men were discouraged from entering the bar, it was frequented by the painter Toulouse Lautrec, who lived nearby, in 1897–1899. His lithograph, "Au Hanneton", shows Madame Armande at a table inside her bar. She is also depicted in his lithograph La Grande Loge ("A Box at the Theater"), where she is seated at a theater box with bisexual dancer Émilienne d’Alençon. In one biography of Lautrec, Armande Brazier is referred to as "Armande La Borgne" and is said to have treated Lautrec "with maternal affection", while he referred to her as "La Gambetta" after a one-eyed politician because she only had one eye.

Writer, singer, and lyricist Gabriel Montoya collaborated with the painter and lithographer Odilon Redon on a series of depictions of various nightclubs and brasseries in Montmartre, which included Le Hanneton. In his 1896 Roman Comique du Chat Noir (Comic Novel of the Black Cat), Montoya dedicated the poem he wrote inspired by the Hanneton, Les Lesbiennes, "to the ladies of the Hanneton and La Souris".

In the poem, he describes the bar's customers as "perverse flowers of love" who "lean on their elbows, coquettish", and as "androgynes and sphinxes" who "nourish strange passions".

== See also ==
- Le Monocle (lesbian bar)
- New Moon (nightclub)
- Chez Moune
- LGBT culture in Paris
- Palmyre (bar owner)
