= Le Monocle =

Parisian lesbian bar

Le Monocle was a Parisian lesbian bar, opened in the 1920s by Lulu de Montparnasse. Located on Boulevard Edgar-Quinet, it closed during the occupation of France by Germany in World War II.

== Presentation ==
The name of the club comes from the fact that the monocle was used as a symbol of recognition among lesbian individuals in the early 20th century. After the "flamboyant 1920s and the retrenchment of the 1930s," the bar was closed during the occupation of France by Germany during World War II.

It was one of the first lesbian clubs in the city. At its peak, Le Monocle was considered a luxurious club where "fashionable" women could dance, talk, and kiss without fearing judgment or persecution. Regarded as a popular venue for lesbians in Paris during the 1920s and 1930s, its reputation as a safe space for women was well-known. There were often long queues to enter the club, which featured an all-female orchestra. It was also a meeting and networking place for artists, intellectuals, and influential women. However, like all lesbian venues, the women who used to work there were "constantly monitored by the police."

It was at Le Monocle that cabaret manager Frede met Anaïs Nin and Marlene Dietrich, with whom she later had a love affair. Frede then opened her own lesbian cabaret with the help of Dietrich. Businesswoman Marthe Hanau also frequented Le Monocle with her partner Josèphe.

The photographer Brassaï was allowed to enter the bar and take photos in 1932. The athlete Violette Morris appeared in one of these photos taken at Le Monocle with Lulu de Montparnasse, and one of the prints was sold for $17,500 at Christie's in 2012.

Lucienne Franchi, also known as Lulu de Montparnasse, gave the spotlight on stage to Line Marsa, the mother of Édith Piaf. After the sale of Le Monocle, she also became the owner of the cabaret La Roulotte.

Le Monocle is mentioned in the works of historian Florence Tamagne, who describes it as a place where "all women dressed like men, in tuxedos, and had their hair cut in a bob."

== See also ==
- Le Hanneton (lesbian bar)
- New Moon (nightclub)
- Chez Moune
- Le Rat Mort
- LGBT Culture in Paris
