= Frede (cabaret manager) =

French host and cabaret manager

- Born: Suzanne Jeanne Baulé; 8 November 1914; Paris, France
- Died: 13 February 1976 (aged 61); Mareil-le-Guyon, France
- Education: École Duperré
- Occupation: Cabaret manager

Frede (born Suzanne Jeanne Baulé, 8 November 1914 – 13 February 1976) was a French host and manager of cabarets in Paris and Biarritz. Openly lesbian, Frede was the first to allow women to dance together in a classic cabaret. She is known for her relationships with actresses Marlene Dietrich, Zina Rachevsky, Lana Marconi, and María Félix. She has been featured as a character in Patrick Modiano's books.

== Biography ==
=== Debut at Monocle and meeting with Marlene Dietrich ===
Suzanne Jeanne Baulé was born in Paris on 8 November 1914 to a plumassier and an insurance agent who called her Jeannette. They lived at 19 Rue Labat, in the Clignancourt Quarter in the 18th arrondissement of Paris. Baulé studied at the École Duperré before starting to work by painting sets at the Folies Bergère. She became a trainer at Le Monocle, a women's nightclub located on Boulevard Edgar-Quinet in Paris. At this time, she adopted the pseudonym of Frede, as well as male clothing, both of which she would keep throughout her life. One evening in December 1935, at Le Monocle, she met Anaïs Nin. In her diary, Nin describes Frede's "bright" blue eyes, "round face", "little nose", and "soft features".

It was also at Le Monocle that she met Marlene Dietrich in 1936, with whom she had a romantic affair until the war. Correspondence in the Marlene Dietrich archives in Berlin indicates that the two women remained friends until the 1970s.

With the support of Dietrich, Frede left Le Monocle and opened her own female cabaret in December 1938. Located at 58 Rue Notre-Dame-de-Lorette, near Quartier Pigalle, it was named La Silhouette, after a famous women's cabaret in Berlin which Dietrich was fond of.

=== World War II ===
Shortly after the outbreak of World War II in September 1939, Frede left Paris and La Silhouette and went on an exodus to Biarritz. In December 1939, with her partner Germaine Dupuy, she opened a night establishment, Le Touch-Wood, on Boulevard de la Grande-Plage [Big Beach Boulevard].

She remained in Biarritz until 1943, when she temporarily returned to Paris. She then worked for a while at the Triolet, Rue Galilée, at the top of Champs-Élysées, then temporarily reverted to her Suzanne Baulé name and hid until the end of the war with her younger brother Pierre in Voisines, Yonne.

=== Le Carroll's ===
Returning to Paris at the end of the war, Frede ran a bar in 1945-46 located at Villaret-de-Joyeuse Square. In 1948, she was hired as director of the cabaret Le Carroll's, located at 36 Rue de Ponthieu, near the Champs-Elysées. It became one of the chicest cabarets in Paris, with shows with Charles Aznavour, Dany Dauberson, and Mouloudji. Some of the other performers recorded a 1959 record, Une soirée exceptionnelle au Carroll’s présentée par Frede. These shows attracted many personalities, particularly from the world of cinema: Brigitte Bardot, Arletty, Orson Welles, Gary Cooper, Rita Hayworth, Marlon Brando, Jean Gabin, Françoise Sagan, and Erich von Stroheim.

In 1949, Frede was the first to allow women to dance together in a classical cabaret, although the law prohibited it. Little by little, she changed the atmosphere of Le Carroll's, which became a place for lesbians to meet.

During this period, she maintained relationships with actresses Zina Rachewsky and Lana Marconi, the last wife of Sacha Guitry. "I practically lived with Sacha for four years," said Frede in 1974.

Frede also had a passionate affair with Mexican actress María Félix. The two women met in 1950, and lived together at the Hotel George V. The relationship was captured in a painting made by Leonor Fini of a plant with two flowers; one had the face of Félix and the other Frede's. Frede followed Félix on her filming trips to Buenos Aires and São Paulo, confronting Félix in the former upon learning of Félix's relationship with Carlos Thompson during the filming of La pasión desnuda. Félix and Frede's relationship was interrupted by Félix's marriage to Jorge Negrete in 1952, but upon Negrete's death the following year, Félix returned to Paris to briefly rekindle her relationship with Frede. However, they would violently break-up for good in 1954, leading to a trial in which Félix wanted to take back jewellery she had given to Frede and accused her of theft. Félix lost her lawsuit, and Frede was acquitted and kept the jewellery. Despite this, Félix held ownership of the painting Fini made of the two women, and afterwards asked Fini to modify it to erase Frede's face, painting Félix's face over Frede's, resulting in the painting's two flowers both having Felix's face.

In 1960, the owner of Carroll's, Jacques Sicre, felt that Frede already had her day. He entrusted the establishment to a former actor, François Patrice, who renamed it La Licorne. Frede and her American companion, Miki Leff, created a nightclub also called Le Carroll's, at 12 Rue Sainte-Anne, the site of the former La Vie Parisienne, held before the Second World War by Suzy Solidor, and then picked up by Colette Mars. Here, the patrons included Salvador Dalí, Michèle Morgan, Pauline Carton, Darryl Zanuck, and, once again, Dietrich.

Suffering from leukemia, in September 1970, Frede finally sold this second Carroll's to Fabrice Emaer. She retired to her country house in Mareil-Le-Guyon. Frede died there, attended by Leff, on 13 February 1976.

The France-Soir newspaper wrote in her obituary that "The one who, for civil status, (Note: Noting that Frede never married) was never more than Frédérique Baulé [sic], (Note: Frédérique Baulé was never her legal name, and she did not use this appellation.) must be considered as one of the greatest seducers of her time." She is buried in the cemetery of Mareil-le-Guyon.

== Portrayal by Patrick Modiano ==
A woman who always dressed as a man fascinated writer Patrick Modiano, the 2014 Nobel Prize in Literature recipient whose mother knew Frede. Modiano portrayed her as a character in his novella Remise de peine [Suspended Sentence] and a drawing representing her illustrates the covers of the first paperback editions. He also mentioned Frede in his autobiography Un pedigree.

== Bibliography ==
- Cosnard, Denis (2017). Frede : Belle de Nuit [Frede: Night Beauty] (in French). Paris: Équateurs. ISBN 9782849904992. OCLC 989824609.
