= Ada "Bricktop" Smith =

American entertainer and nightclub owner (1894–1984)

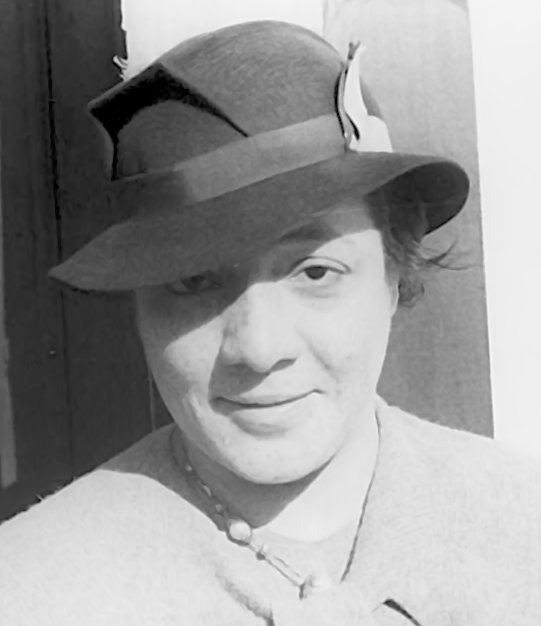
- Smith in 1934
- Born: August 14, 1894; Alderson, West Virginia, U.S.
- Died: February 1, 1984 (aged 89); New York City, U.S.
- Known for: Dancer, singer, vaudeville performer, nightclub owner

Ada Beatrice Queen Victoria Louise Virginia "Bricktop" Smith DuConge (née Smith; August 14, 1894 – February 1, 1984) was an American dancer, jazz singer, vaudevillian, and self-described saloon-keeper who owned the famous nightclub Chez Bricktop in Paris from 1924 to 1961, as well as clubs in Mexico City and Rome.

== Childhood ==
Smith was born in Alderson, West Virginia, the youngest of four children by a Black father and a mixed-race mother, who had been born into slavery two years before the Emancipation Proclamation. Her grandfather was likely her mother's Irish-American enslaver. When her father died, her family relocated to Chicago, and she was raised there for her greater youth. It was there that saloon life caught her fancy, and where she acquired her nickname, "Bricktop," for the flaming red hair and freckles inherited from her grandfather.

== Career ==
=== Theater and performance ===
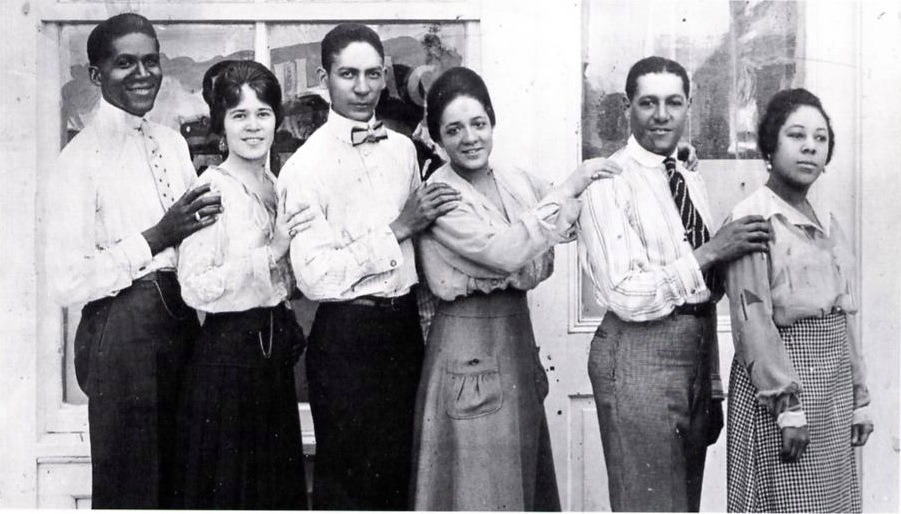
Ada Bricktop Smith (center) circa 1917 with other performers

Smith began performing when she was young, and by 16, she was touring with T.O.B.A. (Theatre Owners' Booking Association) and on the Pantages vaudeville circuit. When she was 20, her performance tours brought her to New York City. While at Barron's Exclusive Club, a nightspot in Harlem, she put in a good word for a band called Elmer Snowden's Washingtonians, and the club booked them. One of its members was Duke Ellington.

She was a prolific dancer. Her first meeting with Cole Porter is described in her obituary in The Herald-Dispatch (Huntington, West Virginia):

Porter once walked into the cabaret and ordered a bottle of wine. "Little girl, can you do the Charleston?" he asked. Yes, she said. And when she demonstrated the new dance, he exclaimed, "What legs! What legs!"

Smith continued to perform as a cabaret entertainer well into her eighties, including some engagements at the age of 84 in London, and included Cole Porter's "Love for Sale" in her repertoire.

==== Cafe society ====
By 1924, she was in Paris. Cole Porter hosted many parties, "lovely parties" as Smith called them, where he hired her as an entertainer, often to teach his guests the latest dance craze such as the Charleston and the Black Bottom. At age 28, Smith was invited to sing at the Montmartre club Le Grand Duc owned by Eugène Bullard. There, she befriended Langston Hughes, a then-struggling poet who worked alongside her as a dishwasher and busboy.

Known for her signature cigars, the "doyenne of cafe society" drew many celebrated figures to her club, including Cole Porter, the Duke and Duchess of Windsor, and F. Scott Fitzgerald. Fitzgerald mentions the club in his 1931 short story "Babylon Revisited." Her protégés included Duke Ellington, Mabel Mercer, and Josephine Baker. The Cole Porter song "Miss Otis Regrets" was written especially for her to perform. Django Reinhardt and Stephane Grappelli wrote a song called "Brick Top," which they recorded in Paris in 1937 and in Rome in 1949.

=== Chez Bricktop and other clubs ===
In Paris, Bricktop began operating the clubs where she performed, including The Music Box and Le Grand Duc. She called her next club "Chez Bricktop," and in 1929 she relocated it to 66 rue Pigalle. Her headliner was a young Mabel Mercer. During World War II, she closed Chez Bricktop and moved to Mexico City, where she opened a new nightclub in 1944.

In 1949, she returned to Europe and started a club in Rome called "Roman Chez Bricktop" located on the Via Veneto where she entertained famous guests including Elizabeth Taylor, Frank Sinatra, and Martin Luther King, Jr.

Shortly after moving to Rome, Smith received a call from the first secretary, Amin, to the abdicated King Farouk. According to Smith, when Amin asked for her to visit, she said, "I'm not drinking. I'm on a novena," to which he responded with, "We're not drinking either, but we're with everybody here at the hotel. They're all talking about you, and my king wants to meet the woman who makes everyone scream when she walks through the door." King Farouk and Smith had a friendship for many years. Farouk would bring Smith gifts from his travels like bottles of perfume and cigars. After King Farouk fired Amin, he didn't want Smith to have anything to do with his former secretary. Smith told Farouk, "Majesty, I didn't even allow my own mother to choose my friends for me." At that point, King Farouk stopped coming to the club and Smith never saw him again.

John Steinbeck was once thrown out of her club for "ungentlemanly behavior." He regained her affection by sending a taxi full of roses.

Smith closed her club and retired in 1961 at the age of 67, saying: "I'm tired, honey. Tired of staying up all night." Afterwards, she moved back to the United States.

=== Film, music and radio ===
Smith appeared in the 1974 Michael Schultz's film Honeybaby, Honeybaby, in which she played herself, operating a "Bricktop's" in Beirut, Lebanon. She made a brief cameo appearance as herself in Woody Allen's 1983 mockumentary film Zelig, in which she "reminisced" about a visit by Leonard Zelig to her club, and an unsuccessful attempt by Cole Porter to find a rhyme for "You're the top, you're Leonard Zelig."

In 1972, Smith made a recording of "So Long Baby", with Cy Coleman. She also recorded a few Cole Porter songs in New York City at the end of the seventies with pianist Dorothy Donegan. The session was directed by Otis Blackwell and produced by Jack Jordan on behalf of the Sweet Box Company. The songs recorded were "Love For Sale," "Miss Otis Regrets," "Happiness Is a Thing Called Joe," "A Good Man Is Hard to Find," "Am I Blue?," and "He's Funny That Way." This recording has not been released. She preferred not to be called a singer or dancer, but rather a performer.

Smith broadcast a radio program in Paris from 1938 to 1939, for the French government.

== Activism ==
Smith was a dedicated life member of the NAACP. She traveled to the national office to present the executive director with a $500 cheque to place her membership.

== Published works ==
Smith wrote her autobiography, Bricktop with the help of James Haskins, a prolific author who wrote biographies of Thurgood Marshall and Rosa Parks. It was published in 1983 by Atheneum Books, New York (ISBN 0-689-11349-8).

== Personal life ==
=== Marriage and relationships ===
Smith married saxophonist Peter DuCongé in 1929. Though they separated after a few years, they never divorced, Bricktop later saying that "as a Catholic I do not recognize divorce". According to Jean-Claude Baker, one of Josephine Baker's children, as recorded in his book about his mother's life, titled Josephine: The Hungry Heart, Baker and Bricktop were involved in an intimate affair for a time, early in their careers.

Bricktop had a professional relationship with Maya Angelou, which Angelou writes about in her book Singin' and Swingin' and Gettin' Merry Like Christmas. Angelou worked at Bricktop's for a time as a singer, though Bricktop nearly turned her away at the door at their first meeting, as she had a rule against allowing unescorted women into her club.

While in Rome, Bricktop befriended The Duke of Windsor. After being a big fan of hers since the early '30s, he visited her in Rome, asking her: "Brick, where were you born?" She told him West Virginia. The Duke responded with "That's just what I told the Duchess when we were in Hot Springs. I said to the Duchess: 'You know, Bricktop was born around here somewhere!'"

=== Death ===
Bricktop died in her sleep at her apartment in Manhattan in 1984, aged 89. She remained active into her old age and according to James Haskins, had talked to friends on the phone hours before her death. She is interred in the Zinnia Plot (Range 32, Grave 74) at Woodlawn Cemetery.

== Legacy ==
Bricktop had planned on creating a film centered around her life. Both Lena Horne and Dorothy Dandridge were up to play Bricktop, though she preferred Pearl Bailey. Bricktop commented that Bailey is "more familiar with my life" and that Dandrige "can't go the way I used to go at her age."

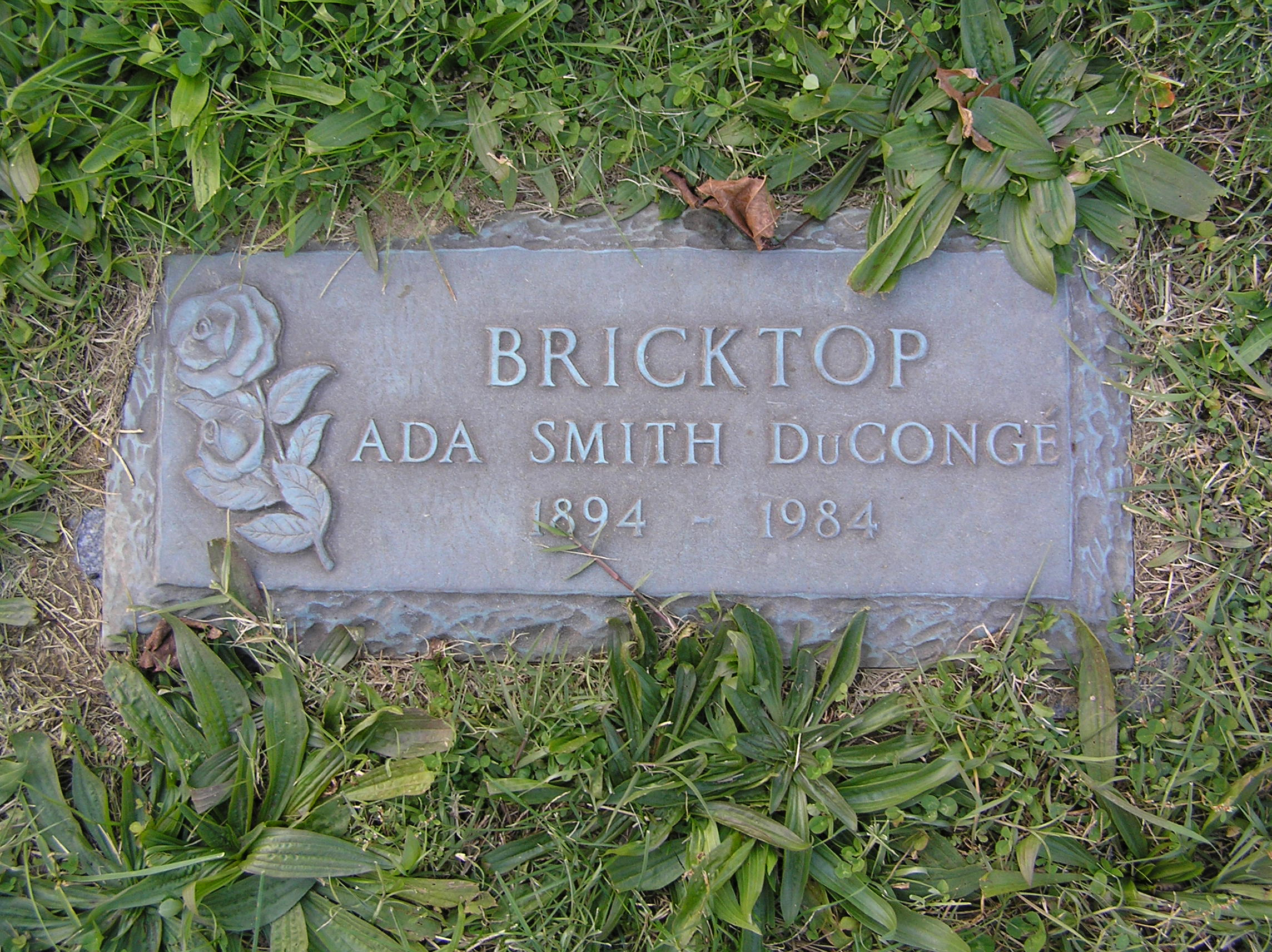
Bricktop's grave

== Sources ==
- Peterson, Bernard L. (2001). Profiles of African American Stage Performers and Theatre People, 1816-1960. Westport (Connecticut): Greenwood Press. pp. 31–32. ISBN 0-313-29534-4. OCLC 231876719.
