= The Countess (courtesan) =

19th-century French courtesan, writer, and singer

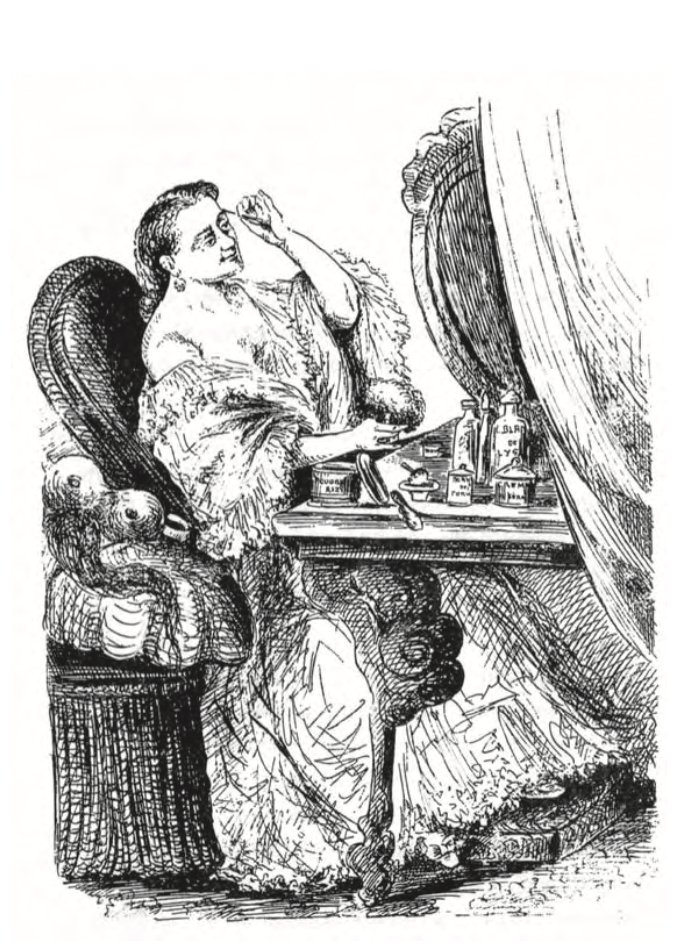
- 1874 self-portrait of The Countess at her toilette
- Born: Arthur Berloget; Paris, Île-de-France
- Other names: Pauline, Arthur W
- Occupations: Courtesan, singer, writer, artist
- Partners: Gustave Engel

The Countess (French: La Comtesse; born Arthur Berloget), also known as Pauline and Arthur W, was a French transgender courtesan, demimondaine, singer, artist, and writer who was prominent in Parisian society throughout the 1850s and 1860s. She was the mistress of a nobleman and later became a singer in Parisian cafés and cabarets. Berloget was an active member of an LGBT community in Paris, whose members were called filles, mignons and tribade sisters.

She was drafted to serve in the French Army, and was forced to temporarily detransition. She was arrested in 1861 for robbery and for deserting her post, and was sentenced to ten years in prison.

In 1874, she authored an autobiography The Secret Confessions of a Parisian: The Countess, 1850-1871, which was published in 1895. Her autobiography describes intimate details of her life living as a woman during the Second French Empire and the beginning of La Belle Époque. She drew illustrations of herself and other members of her queer community for her autobiography.

== Biography ==
The Countess was born Arthur Berloget in Paris to working class parents. Her father was a coachman and her mother was a dressmaker. As an adolescent, she engaged in sexual relationships with older men. She began presenting as a woman in her teenage years and going by the name Pauline, later becoming a mistress of a man who was a member of the French nobility and the son of a marquis. Her lover abandoned her after a few years. While living as a courtesan in Paris, she earned a living as a cabaret and café-concert singer.

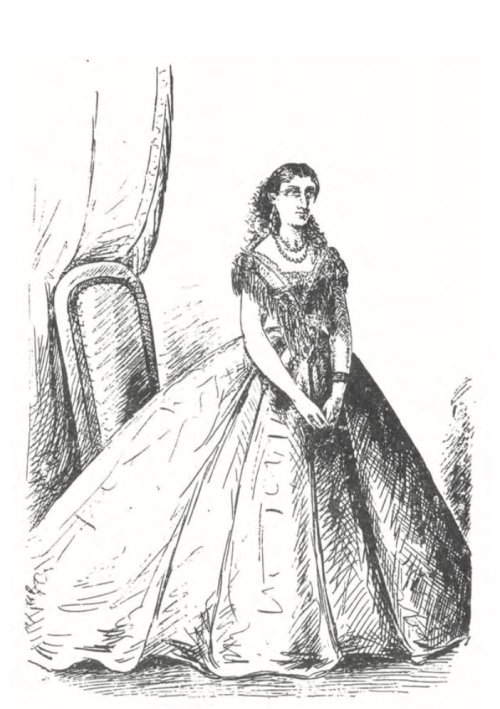
Berloget's drawing of La Charles

Berloget was drafted to serve in the French Army, and had to spend that time presenting as a man. She wrote about the sadness that her temporary detransition caused her. She later deserted from her post. In 1861, Berloget was arrested for desertion and theft, and was sentenced to ten years in prison. While in prison, she met a fellow prisoner named Gustave Engel, who she describes in her autobiography as the love of her life. Upon her release from prison, she returned to her life in Paris, living as a woman.

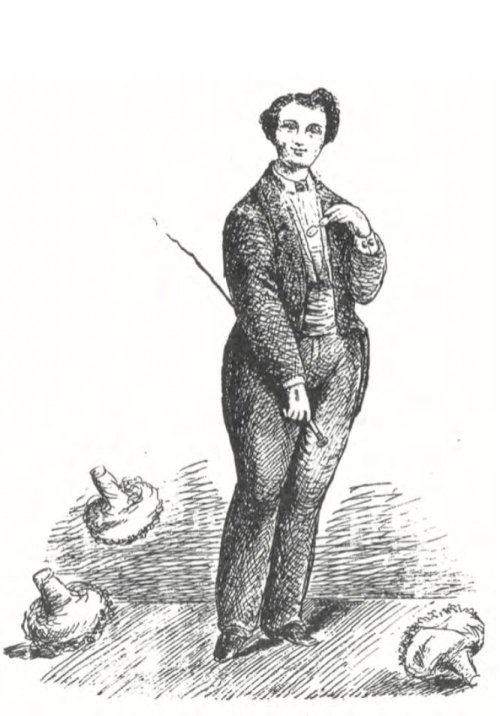
Berloget's drawing of a Tribade Sister

Berloget was part of a LGBT community in Paris made up of filles and mignons, transgender women, and tribade sisters, lesbians and transgender men. She was given the name "The Countess" by this community during a ceremony, which she wrote about in her 1874 autobiography The Secret Confessions of a Parisian: The Countess, 1850-1871, which was published in 1895. The autobiography details her life in Paris living as a woman throughout the Second French Empire and the beginning of La Belle Époque. She wrote of her gender transition, "I, who had so desired to be a girl, have triumphed over natural law." She documented her coming out process to her mother, who welcomed her as a daughter, and wrote about the mutual support that the filles and tribade sisters provided each other. Berloget described her community as a family, and wrote about the lavish parties and soirées they hosted. A dilettante artist, she illustrated her autobiography with drawings of herself and her contemporaries, including a fellow fille known as La Charles and a tribade known as B.
