= André Baudry =

French writer (1922–2018)

André Baudry (31 August 1922 – 1 February 2018) was a French writer who was the founder of the homophile review Arcadie.

A former seminarian and philosophy professor, Baudry became interested in the debate about sexuality following the publication of the Kinsey report in 1948, the Deuxième Sexe by Simone de Beauvoir in 1952, and the theology thesis of the same year entitled Vie Chrétienne et problèmes de la sexualité by Marc Oraison. This thesis, which clearly articulated the position for the Catholic Church to take a more inclusive attitude towards homosexuality, was blacklisted by the Church.

The Arcadie review was created by André Baudry with the support of Roger Peyrefitte and Jean Cocteau. It was immediately forbidden for sale to minors and was censured. André Baudry was prosecuted in 1955 for "outrage aux bonnes mœurs" (outrage against good morals), convicted, and fined 400,000 francs. The review emphasized homosexuality as a form of consciousness and self-identity as opposed to a sexuality per se. Baudry sought to shape the popular image of homosexuals as conventional members of society with conventional desires. In 1960, at the time of the promulgation of the Mirguet amendment which cast homosexuality as the source of all social ills, Baudry eliminated the classified ads and photographs from the review, out of fear of being shut down. During its years of publication, Arcadie was the most influential homophile publication in francophone Europe.

The number of subscribers fluctuated between 1300 and 10,000. These subscriptions allowed to create the Arcadie Club.

In 1975, André Baudry was invited to testify on the television on les Dossiers de l'écran. He renamed the Arcadie association the « Mouvement homophile de France » (Homophile Movement of France). In 1979, he invited a large congress of sympathetic well-known intellectuals like Michel Foucault, Robert Merle, and Paul Veyne.

== Bibliography ==
- Christopher Miles, « Arcadie, ou l'impossible éden », La Revue h, Number 1, 1996.
- Georges Sidéris, « Des folles de Saint-Germain-des-prés au fléau social », in Esther Benbassa et J.-C. Attias, La Haine de soi, Bruxelles, Complexe, 2000.
- Olivier Jablonski, « Arcadie », Dictionnaire des cultures gays et lesbiennes, Larousse, 2003.
- Julian Jackson, « Arcadie : sens et enjeux de « l'homophilie » en France, 1954-1982 », Revue d'histoire moderne et contemporaine, Volume 53, No. 4, 2006.
- Julian T. Jackson, « Sur l’homosexualité en France au XXe siècle (entretien avec Hervé Baudry) », La Ligne d'ombre, nº 2, 2007.
- Julian Jackson, « Arcadie », La vie homosexuelle en France, de l'après-guerre à la dépénalisation, Éditions Autrement, Paris, 2009.
- Jackson, Julian (2009). Living in Arcadia: Homosexuality, Politics, and Morality in France from the Liberation to AIDS. University of Chicago Press. ISBN 978-0-226-38928-8.

== See also ==
- Arcadie (French homophile review)
