= Henri-Lambert de Thibouville =

French writer

Henri-Lambert d'Herbigny, marquis de Thibouville (1710 in Paris – 1784) was a notable French writer, wit and bisexual.

== Life ==
=== Career ===
Born to a conseiller d'État, he at first followed a military career, rising to the rank of mestre de camp in the régiment des dragons de la Reine. He then left the army for a literary career and linked himself to Voltaire, via an assiduous correspondence (more than 50 letters by Voltaire to Thibouville survive). His taste for the theatre and declamation allowed him to act as intermediary between Voltaire and actors putting on his plays, and sometimes between Voltaire and his editors.

=== Sexuality ===
In 1731, Thibouville had married Louise-Élisabeth de Rochechouart, taking a female mistress, Mélanie de Laballe (who had débuted at the Comédie Française in 1746, in the rôle of Agnès in École des femmes and died of smallpox in 1748 aged only 16). This gave rise to the epigram

Agnès, débuting in the world,

Claimed to have lovers;
But she did not want to have
A slightly round belly aged 14.
"Ah! Leave at least my height",
She said to a certain marquis. -
"The proposal", he said, "is exquisite!"
"I am not among the scoundrels.
You can fix your foundation on me.
You know, young marvel
That children are never made
By the c... nor by the ear."

Melchior Grimm described Thibouville, probably around 1759, as "even more attached than M. de Villette to the cult of love which our sages rudely proscribe, but which those of ancient Greece excused with such indulgence", referring to his notorious bisexuality. Voltaire himself, in the first editions of La Pucelle d'Orléans, mentioned him alongside Honoré-Armand de Villars in the following verses:

Such has been seen, Thibouville and Villars,

Imitators of the first of the Caesars,
All inflamed by the fire they possessed,
Head lowered, attending on a Nicomedes;
And seconding, by frequent gaps,
The valiant blows of their Picard lackeys.

In a letter of 21 May 1755, to Thibouville Voltaire denied being the real author of those lines - "My poor Pucelle has become an infamous p..., accused of insupportable vulgarities. It is still mixed up with satire; for their commodity of rhyme, scandalous verses have been slipped into it against the people to whom I am most attached." However, Voltaire was accustomed to making these disingenuous denials and the veracity of this one is questionable.

== Works ==
Thibouville's reputation rests more on his wit than his talent and his literary works have received little critical acclaim. The surviving ones include:

- Thélamine, tragedy, 1739;
- L'École de l'Amitié, novel, 1757;
- Le Danger des passions, ou anectodotes syriennes et égyptiennes, 1758;
- Réponses d'Abeilard à Héloïse, 1758;
- Namir, tragedy, 1759;
- Qui ne risque rien n'a rien, 1772;
- Plus heureux, 1772.
