= Arcadie =

French homophile organization (1954–1982)

The Association Arcadie, or simply Arcadie, was a French homophile organization established in the early 1950s by André Baudry, an ex-seminarian and philosophy professor. From its creation in the mid-1950s through the mid-1970s, Arcadie played a dominant role in the lives of French homosexuals as both a political and a social organization.

== Founding ==
The Association Arcadie was founded in 1954 as the first homophile group in French history. The goal of the organization was "to present homosexuals as respectable, cultured, and dignified individuals deserving of greater social tolerance". The Arcadie association also aimed to "educate adult homophiles, who, too weak and lacking knowledge, could not on their own live with dignity" through social activities and through its publication, Revue Arcadie.

== Revue Arcadie ==
The Association Arcadie began publishing the literary review Arcadie: revue littéraire et scientifique, which became the most important French homosexual publication of its time, in January 1954, though some sources claim that it began publication in 1957. During its years of operation, Arcadie became popular amongst a number of prominent French intellectual figures; Jean Cocteau contributed a drawing of a boy to the first issue of the review. Revue Arcadie remained in continuous publication until 1982 when the laws regarding homosexual conduct were changed to be identical with those relating to heterosexual behavior. Its emphasis on "dignity" and "respectability" led the Revue Arcadie to be increasingly out-of-step with the more revolutionary gay political organizations demanding civil rights for gay men and lesbians in France. Upon seeing that the review's message was no longer effective in creating social change and seeing more progressive organizations securing rights for homosexuals, the editors decided to cease publication.

== Club Arcadie ==
In 1957, the Club Arcadie secured a clubhouse in Paris, from which it sponsored social gatherings, talks and cultural outings.

The club strove to present gay and lesbian individuals as conventional members of French society. Historian Michael Sibalis describes the belief of the group "that public hostility to homosexuals resulted largely from their outrageous and promiscuous behaviour; homophiles would win the good opinion of the public and the authorities by showing themselves to be discreet, dignified, virtuous and respectable." As such, Arcadie prohibited overt demonstrations of romantic affection such as kissing on its dance floor.

At various points in its history, Arcadie also sponsored activities in the French provinces and in Belgium. The Arcadie club was also known as the Club littâeraire et scientifique des Pays Latins (CLESPALA) and the Paris-Club.

== Evolution and disbanding ==
The Club Arcadie disbanded in 1982 and publication of the Revue Arcadie ended shortly after the laws governing homosexual behavior were brought into accord with the laws governing heterosexual behavior.

In a final letter to the readers of Arcadie published in the May 15, 1982, issue, the leaders of the association explained their reasons for closing the club and ceasing publication of the review:

[Arcadie], created in 1957, decided upon its dissolution during a gen-
eral meeting on May 13. The goals that each of us had fixed upon
[Arcadie's] creation have been a constant concern during its twenty-five
years of activity, and regardless of what has happened, they gener?
ally have been kept. Times have changed, far too much, some would
say. The painful declaration was made over the last months that this
club could no longer justify itself, from the time when it became for
most uniquely a space for pleasure, for frivolity, and for far too few a space for reflection, for courtesy, for respect, and for friendship. It was
not created just to provide a better environment for unique weekend
dances. The so-called cultural activities are dead. Those of you in Paris
who are reading this, moreover, did NOTHING to maintain them by
participating even a little through your presence. . . . This world of
permissiveness, of irresponsibility, of frivolity, of obscenity - and the
homophile people beat the records in this sad domain - breaks down
our energies and makes the continuation of activities that no longer
correspond to those of the club's founders entirely futile.

--quoted in Gunther (2004)

== Bibliography ==
- Jablonski, Olivier. « Arcadie », Dictionnaire des cultures gays et lesbiennes, Larousse, 2003.
- Jackson, Julian. « Arcadie : sens et enjeux de « l'homophilie » en France, 1954–1982 », Revue d'histoire moderne et contemporaine, No. 53-4, 2006.
- Jackson, Julian T. « Sur l’homosexualité en France au XXe siècle (entretien avec Hervé Baudry) », La Ligne d'ombre, nº 2, 2007.
- Jackson, Julian. « Arcadie », La vie homosexuelle en France, de l'après-guerre à la dépénalisation, Editions Autrement, Paris, 2009.
- Miles, Christopher. « Arcadie, ou l'impossible éden », La Revue h, No. 1, 1996.
- Miller, Neil. Out of the Past: Gay and Lesbian History from 1869 to the Present. New York: Vintage Books, c1995.
- Sidéris, Georges. « Des folles de Saint-Germain-des-prés au fléau social », in Esther Benbassa et J.-C. Attias, La Haine de soi, Bruxelles, Complexe, 2000.
