= New Moon (nightclub) =

Former lesbian bar and music venue in Paris

Coordinates: 48.8817°N 2.3371°E

New Moon was a Parisian nightclub, located at 66 Rue Pigalle (now Rue Jean-Baptiste Pigalle) in the Place Pigalle, that started in the late 19th-century as a headquarters for Impressionist artists. In the 20th century, it became a jazz club and then a lesbian cabaret, before converting to a well-known alternative rock club in the 1980s. It closed in 1995.

== Pre-history ==
In the 1860s, the building where the New Moon was later located was a cafe frequented by French Impressionist painters called La Nouvelle Athènes. In the early 20th century, the cafe added a cabaret to become first Monico, then the New Monico.

Between World War I and World War II, it became Ada "Bricktop" Smith's Chez Bricktop, famous for its jazz and frequented by luminaries like Pablo Picasso, John Steinbeck, Ernest Hemingway. Performers included Marlene Dietrich, Ethel Waters, Duke Ellington and Louis Armstrong. In the 1950s, the club became a striptease cabaret called The Sphinx, then the Narcisse.

== History ==
By the 1960s, it had become the New Moon, and was a lesbian cabaret through the 1960s and 1970s. It closed in the early 1980s, and reopened again in 1987 as an alternative and punk rock club.

From 1987 to 1995 the club was known as one of the most important venues in Paris for punk and alternative rock. Noir Désir, the French Lovers, Mano Negra, the Naked Apes of Reason were a few of the many groups who performed. French photographer Raphaël Rinaldi published the book Paris New Moon, Paris (2016) focused on photography of the venue in the 1980s and 1990s.

After briefly operating as a nightclub called Le Temple, the building was torn down to create office buildings in 2004.

== See also ==
- List of lesbian bars
