= List of lesbian bars =

This is a list of notable lesbian bars worldwide, including early prototypes and modern more inclusive spaces.

== Africa ==
Bar	City	Country	Year opened	Year closed	Notes
Beaulah Bar	Cape Town	South Africa		closed	Originally founded as a lesbian bar, until it became a mixed crowd later
Duchess Lounge	Cape Town	South Africa	2024		Social media page references "sapphics and the queer community" but widely marketed as a lesbian bar

== Asia ==
Bar	City	Country	Year opened	Year closed	Notes
Amazona	Tel Aviv	Israel		2020	Only lesbian bar in the city
Bigudi Club	Istanbul	Turkey	2008		First lesbian bar in Istanbul
Coup d'Etat	Beirut	Lebanon	2006	2007	The Middle East's first "openly" lesbian bar Closed in 2007 and opened again in 2018.
Coup d'Etat	Beirut	Lebanon	2018		The Middle East's first "openly" lesbian bar Closed in 2007 and opened again in 2018.
Lesbos	Seoul	Korea	1996		Lesbos (Korean: 레스보스), located in the Sinchon area of Seoul was opened in 1996 and is the first lesbian bar in South Korea.
L'Paradise	Hong Kong	China	2000s (early)		One of two remaining lesbian bars in Hong Kong as of 2020
Goldfinger	Tokyo	Japan	2000s (early)		"The most famous lesbian bar in all of Tokyo, maybe in one of the most famous in the world"
Roxie's	Shanghai	China	2014	June 2024	First lesbian bar in Shanghai
Virus	Hong Kong	China	1997		Hong Kong's first lesbian bar and as of 2020 one of only two remaining from as many as nine in the early 2000s

== Australia ==
Bar	City	Country	Year opened	Year closed	Notes
Ching-a-lings	Darlinghurst, New South Wales	Australia	2009		Lesbian and nonbinary bar

== Europe ==
Bar	City	Country	Year opened	Year closed	Notes
Cafébar Marianne	Berlin	Germany	2008		Also known as Mariannenbar.
Candy Bar	London	England	1996	2014	
Chez Moune	Paris	France	1936		
Damenklub Violetta	Berlin	Germany	c. 1926	1933	
Daniel's	Barcelona	Spain	1975	closed	One of the first lesbian bars in Spain and one of the first LGBTQ bars in Barcelona
Gateways Club	London	England	1943	2014	
La Gata	Frankfurt	Germany	1971	2026	As of 2021 the only lesbian bar in Frankfurt
Le Hanneton	Paris	France	1890s (early)	1900s	Depicted in lithograph Au Hanneton by Toulouse Lautrec
Le Monocle	Paris	France	1920s	1940s (early)	One of Paris' first and most famous lesbian bars
New Moon	Paris	France	1960s	1980s	
She Soho	London	England	2014		
Saarein	Amsterdam	Netherlands	1978		The oldest still existing women's café of Amsterdam
Bar Buka	Amsterdam	Netherlands	2019		

== North America ==
Bar	City	State	Country	Year opened	Year closed	Notes
A League of Her Own	Washington, D.C.		United States	2018		
A Little More	San Francisco	California	United States	1980s		
Amelia's	San Francisco, Mission District	California	United States	1978	1991	
The Anxious Asp	San Francisco, North Beach	California	United States	1958	1967	
Arcana Bar and Lounge	Durham	North Carolina	United States	2015		North Carolina's only lesbian bar in 2024–2025
Artist's Club	San Francisco, North Beach	California	United States	1946	1949	
As You Are Bar	Washington, D.C.		United States			
Babes of Carytown	Richmond	Virginia	United States	1979		
Babiana Club Less	Mexico City		Mexico	2013		
BabyFace Disco	Montreal	Quebec	Canada	1960s (late)	1983	First lesbian bar in Montreal
Bachanal	Albany	California	United States			
Bar Champs	Montreal	Quebec	Canada	2021		Lesbian sports bar
Beaded Bag	San Francisco, North Beach	California	United States			
The Bond Street Bar	Asbury Park	New Jersey	United States	1970s	1980s	Location was also the site of a women's bar in the 1930s
Blanco's	San Francisco, North Beach	California	United States	1943	mid-1950s	Also known as Blanco's Tavern
Blush & Blu	Denver	Colorado	United States	2012	2024	Colorado's only lesbian bar, closed as of October 5, 2024
Bum Bum Bar	New York City, Queens	New York (state)	United States	1990s (early)	2018	
Cafe Des Beaux Arts	New York City	New York (state)	United States	1911	1921	One of the earliest "ladies bars"
Chances Bar	Houston	Texas	United States	1994	2010	
Chez-Elle	Asbury Park	New Jersey	United States	1965	1990	Also known as Chez-L Lounge, opened by a former nun, it was Asbury Park's first "women's club" and a "groundbreaking lesbian nightclub" that was "part of a landmark court case in the 1960s"
Chez Madame Arthur	Montreal	Quebec	Canada	1971	1975	
Chez Jilly's	Montreal	Quebec	Canada	1970s	1970s	
Chi-Chi Club	San Francisco, North Beach	California	United States	1949	1956	
Clementina's Baybrick	San Francisco, South of Market	California	United States	1982	1987	Also known as The Brick, The Bay Brick Inn
Copper Lantern	North Beach, San Francisco	California	United States	1955	1965	
Cubbyhole	New York City, West Village	New York (state)	United States	1994		
Dani's Queer Bar	Boston	Massachusetts	United States	2024		On Boylston Street in Boston's Back Bay neighborhood
Dar's Hideaway	Cupertino	California	United States	1980s	2000s	
Doc Marie's	Portland	Oregon	United States	2022	2025	
Driftwood	Hayward	California	United States			Also known as The Driftwood, and Driftwood Lounge
Dorothy	Chicago	Illinois	United States	2022		
Egyptian Club	Portland	Oregon	United States	1995	2010	
Eve's Hangout	New York City, Greenwich Village	New York (state)	United States	1925	1926	Also known as Eve Adams's Tearoom
Femme Bar	Worcester	Massachusetts	United States	2023		Located in Worcester's Canal District
First Choice/The Night	Newark	New Jersey	United States	1980s		
Front	San Francisco, North Beach	California	United States			
Gina's	Vancouver	British Columbia	Canada	2025	Late 2025	
Ginger's Bar	New York City, Brooklyn	New York (state)	United States	2000		Also known as The G-Spot
Gossip Grill	San Diego	California	United States	2009		
The Grand Union	Seattle	Washington	United States	1950s		
Helene's	Roselle	New Jersey	United States	1960s		
Henrietta Hudson	New York City, West Village	New York (state)	United States	1991		
Herz	Mobile	Alabama	United States	2019	2023	
If Club	Los Angeles, Koreatown	California	United States	1947	c. 1940s	The earliest known lesbian bar in Los Angeles, also known as If Cafe.
Jubilee	Oakland	California	United States			
Just Marion & Lynn's	Houston, Montrose	Texas	United States	1973	1987	One of the first lesbian-oriented bars to open in Houston, the bar closed in 1987, one year after one of the founders was murdered
Kelly's Alamo Club	San Francisco, North Beach	California	United States			A police raid in 1956 and the arrest of 36 women on charges of "frequenting a house of ill repute" led the Daughters of Bilitis to publish a guide, "What To Do In Case of Arrest."
The Key West Hotel	Asbury Park	New Jersey	United States	1981	1990	"The 1980’s most popular club for New Jersey lesbians, and possibly the oldest lesbian venue of its kind on the East Coast" "New Jersey’s largest and most happening lesbian club and hotel" Formerly Owl and Pussycat
The Lexington Club	San Francisco, Mission District	California	United States	1997	2015	
Last Ditch Bar	Greenfield	Massachusetts	United States	2025		Gained national attention after a 2026 Boston Globe profile of the bar went viral.
Lipstick Lounge	East Nashville	Tennessee	United States	2002		
Magnolia	Montreal	Quebec	Canada	1990s	2003	"One of the greats."
Mamzelle's	Philadelphia	Pennsylvania	United States	1982	1986	A separate, private lesbian club ran by Sally Tire in the top two floors of the gay leather bar Bike Stop in Center City.
Marsha's	Philadelphia	Pennsylvania	United States	2025		Marketed as a "queer women's sports bar," rather than specifically a lesbian bar.
Mary’s First and Last Chance	Oakland	California	United States	c. 1948	1956	Closed in 1958 for "catering to lesbians", but the bar challenged the ruling in the State Supreme Court and won in 1959.
Mary’s Tower	San Francisco, North Beach	California	United States	1953	1967	
Maud's	San Francisco, Cole Valley	California	United States	1966	1989	
Miss Smith's Tea Room	San Francisco, North Beach	California	United States	1954	1960	
Mona's 440 Club	San Francisco, North Beach	California	United States	1936	1950s	Sold in the mid-1950s to a former employee, and was renamed "Ann's 440 Club" and then no longer served as a lesbian bar.
Mona’s Candle Light Room	San Francisco, North Beach	California	United States	1948	1957	Later it changed and became the Club Gala, the Jazz Workshop, Burp Hollow, and the Dixie Land Jazz.
Mother Bar	San Francisco, Mission District	California	United States	2023		
My Sister's Room	Atlanta	Georgia (state)	United States	1996		
Ollie's	Oakland	California	United States	1981	1991	
Our Club	San Francisco, North Beach	California	United States			
Page 3	New York City, Greenwich Village	New York (state)	United States	mid-1950s	mid-1960s	
The Palms	West Hollywood	California	United States	1960s	2013	
Paper Doll	San Francisco, North Beach	California	United States	1949	1961	
The Pearl Bar	Houston	Texas	United States	2013		"only lesbian bar in the Bayou City, one of two in Texas and one of 16 in the nation" Profiled in a documentary by the Lesbian Bar Project.
Peg's Place	San Francisco, Richmond District	California	United States	1950s	1988	The site of a 1979 lesbophobic attack by off-duty members of the S.F.P.D.
Phase One	Atlanta	Georgia (state)	United States	2010s		
Phase 1	Washington, D.C.		United States	1970	2016	The oldest continually operating lesbian bar in the country when it closed.
Redz Bar	Los Angeles, Boyle Heights	California	United States	1950s	2015	Originally known as Redheads, it catered to working class Latina lesbians.
Roselle Inn	Chicago	Illinois	United States		1935	Also known as Rose-El-Inn, one of the earliest lesbian bars. Shut down by police in 1935.
Sappho's Tavern	Seattle	Washington	United States	1950s		
The Savoy	Santa Clara	California	United States	1984	2009	
Scott’s Pit	San Francisco	California	United States	1970	1984	The first lesbian biker bar in San Francisco; home of brawls and poetry readings.
The Silver Slipper	Seattle	Washington	United States	1970s		
Sisters	Philadelphia	Pennsylvania	United States		2013	
Slammers	Columbus	Ohio	United States	1993		
Sue Ellen's	Dallas	Texas	United States	1989		
Summit Station	Columbus	Ohio	United States	1971	2008	Ohio's oldest and longest-running lesbian bar
Tin Angel	San Francisco, North Beach	California	United States	1953	1961	
Toasted Walnut	Philadelphia	Pennsylvania	United States	2015	2021	
Tommy's Place/12 Adler Place	San Francisco, North Beach	California	United States	late 1940s	1955	
Val's Lesbian Bar	Philadelphia	Pennsylvania	United States	2026		Philadelphia's first brick-and-mortar lesbian bar since the COVID-19 related closure of Toasted Walnut in 2021.
Walker's Pint	Milwaukee	Wisconsin	United States	2001		"Wisconsin's last lesbian bar"
Wild Side West	San Francisco, Bernal Heights	California	United States	1962		
The Wildrose	Seattle	Washington	United States	1984		A long running lesbian bar on the West Coast.
XX+	Washington, D.C.		United States	2018	closed	

== South America ==
Bar	City	Country	Year opened	Year closed	Notes
Bach Bar	Buenos Aires	Argentina			Oldest lesbian bar in Buenos Aires
