= Alibi's =

Former queer bar in Oklahoma City

Alibi's is a lesbian bar in Oklahoma City, Oklahoma, that closed briefly in January 2024 and reopened in August 2024. It serves as a destination among the queer community in a conservative red state. It is one of the state's last three lesbian bars and the city's most diverse neighborhood bar. Alibi's is located in the city's Shepherd Historic District, and was known for its usage of signs in the space.

The bar was featured in Krista Burton's Moby Dyke, Alexis Clements' All We've Got and Greggor Mattson's Who Needs Gay Bars?, the latter of which also explored the intersectionality between Oklahoma City's BIPOC and Queer communities.

== See also ==
- Lesbian Bar Project
