= Melrose District =

Neighborhood of Phoenix, Arizona

Coordinates: 33.499°N 112.083°W

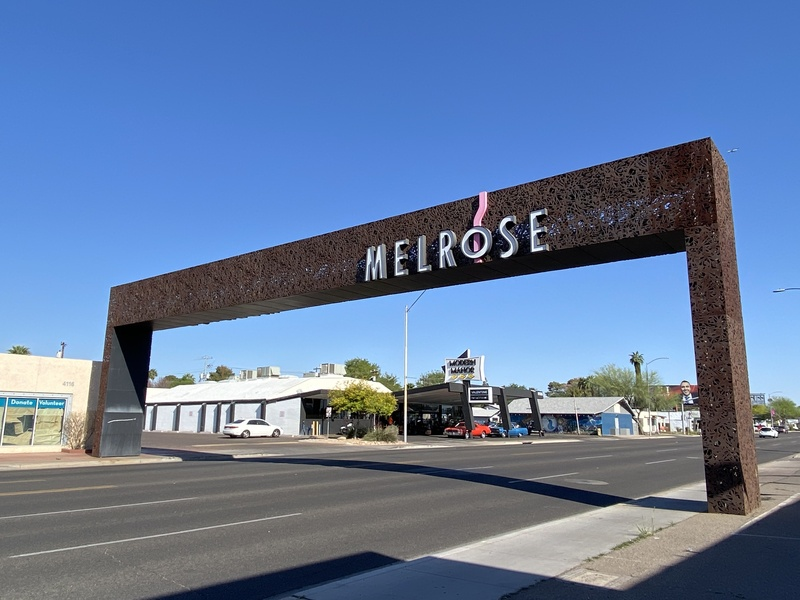
Melrose Arch

The Melrose District is a neighborhood located in north central Phoenix, Arizona along 7th Avenue on the borders the Encanto and Alhambra urban villages. The district has a high concentration of LGBTQ owned or oriented establishments and is known as Phoenix's gayborhood. The mile long stretch of 7th Avenue is also home to the "Melrose Curve," the result of a street misalignment in the city's street-grid planning.

In addition to gay bars, restaurants, and nightclubs, the area also has numerous eclectic antique stores and coffee shops.

The Melrose District is also home to many fairs and events throughout the year, such as thrifting gatherings, the Melrose Street Fair, and events for Phoenix Pride.

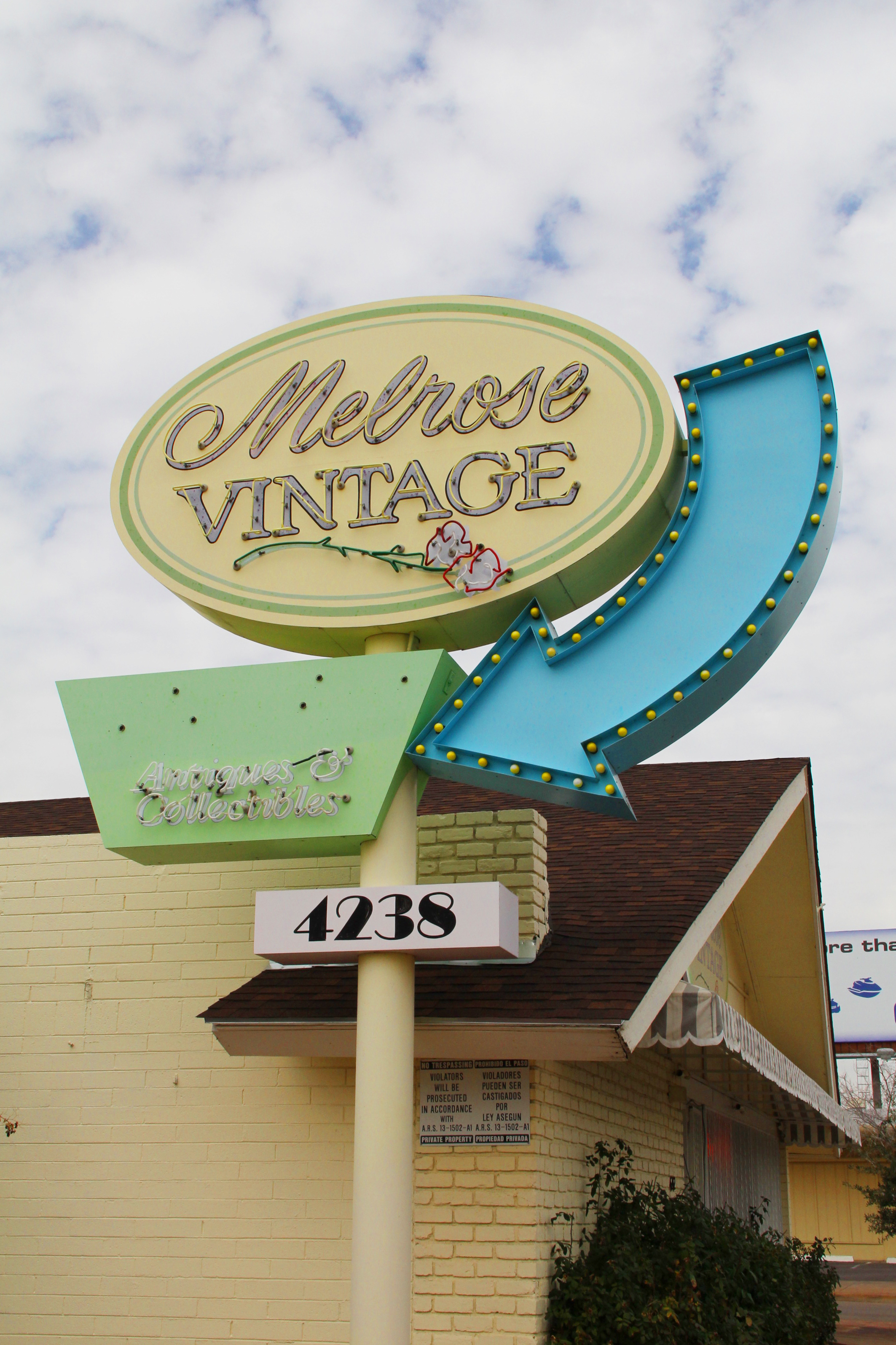
Melrose Vintage Market thrift shop

== Notable establishments ==
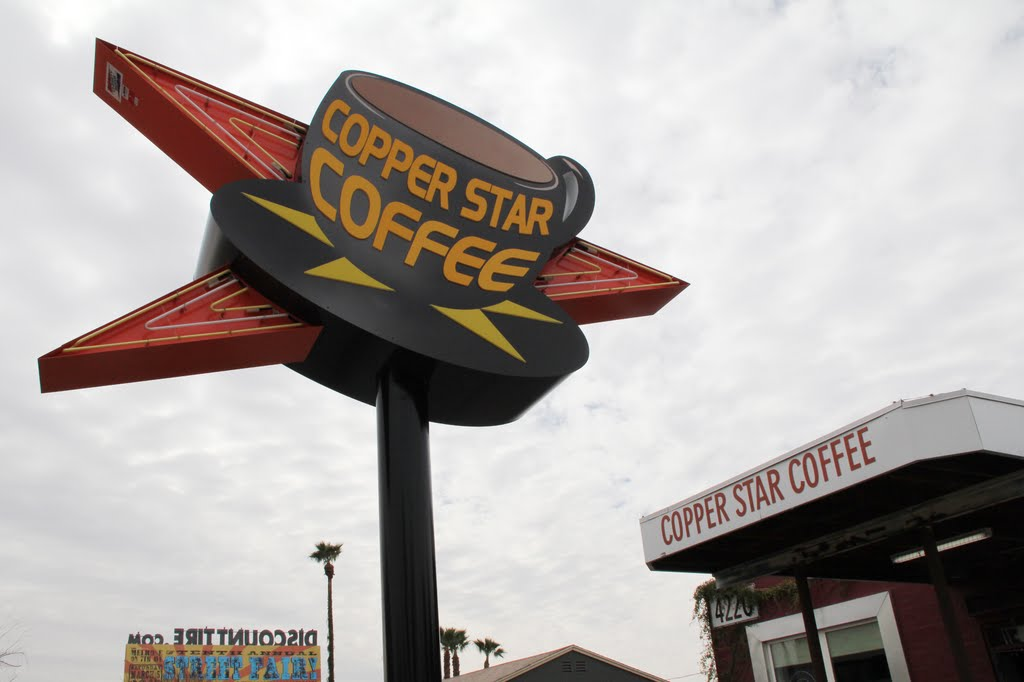
Copper Star Coffee

- Boycott Bar, one of the few lesbian bars in America, received national attention after being featured in the series the Lesbian Bar Project.
- Charlie's Phoenix, first opened in 1984, home for the Arizona Gay Rodeo every February.
- Stacy’s @ Melrose, designed to look like a cathedral and home to drag shows and goth events.
- Copper Star Coffee, housed in a converted gas station.
- Curious Nature, oddity shop.
