= Pearl Bar =

Lesbian bar in Houston, Texas, U.S.

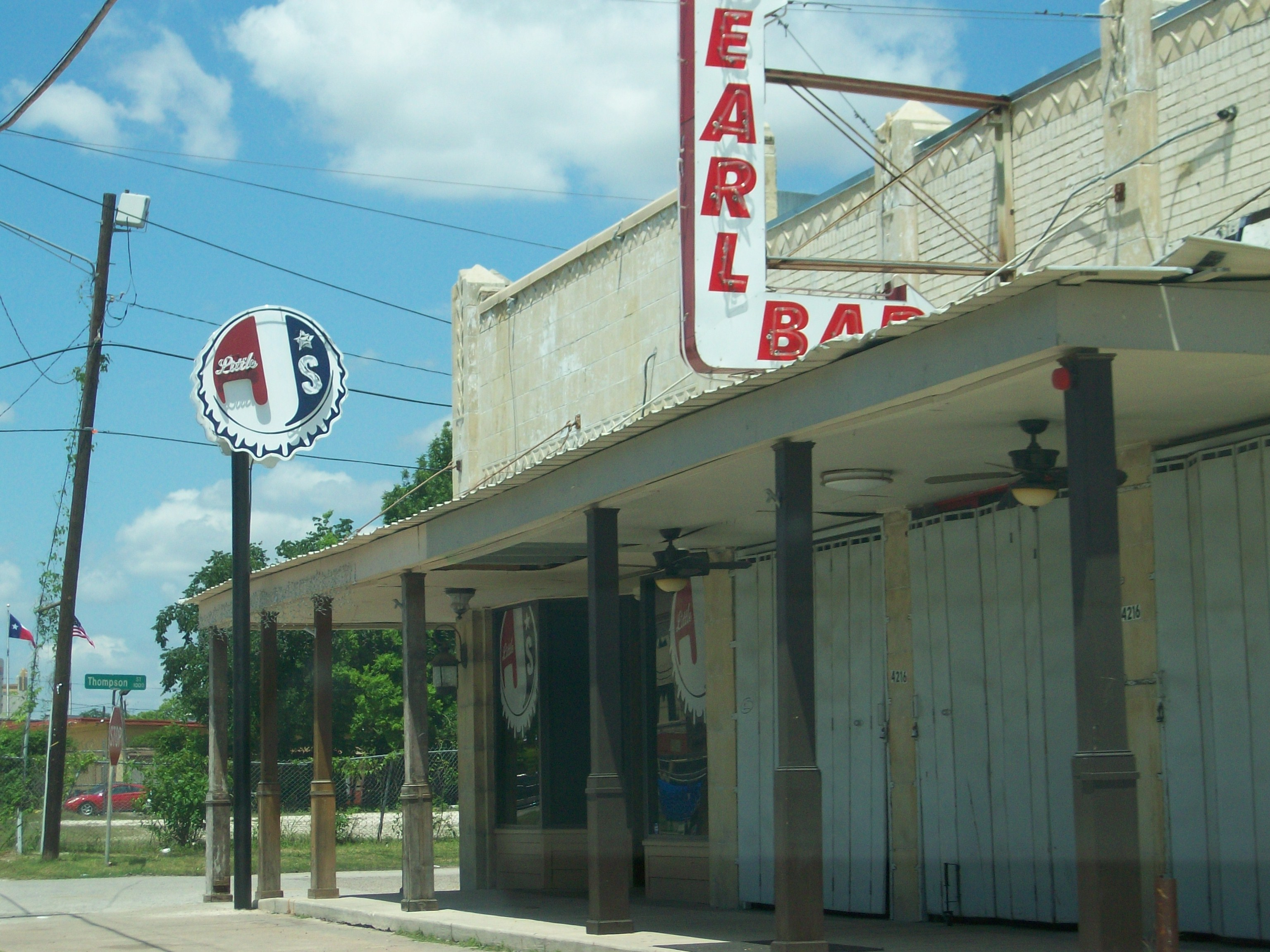
- Address: 4216 Washington Ave; Houston; U.S
- Coordinates: 29.77°N 95.40°W
- Type: Lesbian bar
- Opened: 2013

Website
- pearlhouston.com

Pearl Bar is a lesbian-specific LGBTQ+ bar located on Washington Avenue between the Heights and Montrose neighborhoods of Houston, Texas. It is the only lesbian bar in Houston, one of only two in the state of Texas, and fewer than 25 in the United States. It is known for hosting a variety of events including female-specific DJs, crawfish boils, dildo races and drag performers.

== History ==
Pearl Bar was launched in 2013 by Julie Mabry, a lesbian event promoter and local entrepreneur who understood the need for spaces that specifically cater to women within the LGBTQ+ community.

In 2020 Pearl Bar was one of ten LGBTQ+ businesses across the United States to receive a preservation grant from national non-profit the Human Rights Campaign and Showtime, intended to assist with preserving the venue as a cultural landmark.

In 2022 Pearl Bar was featured in a dedicated episode of the Lesbian Bar Project, a campaign and documentary series created by Erica Rose and Elina Street, exploring and celebrating the remaining lesbian bars in the United States.

In 2023 owner Mabry noted that Pearl Bar had been denied business insurance for the first time due to hosting drag shows, which she attributed predominantly to Texas' proposed anti-LGBTQ+ legislation.

== See also ==
- List of lesbian bars
- Just Marion & Lynn's (1973–1987)
