= Lesbian Bar Project =

Campaign to "celebrate, support, and preserve the remaining lesbian bars"

- Mission statement: "To celebrate, support, and preserve the remaining lesbian bars in the United States."
- Commercial?: No
- Type of project: Fundraising, awareness campaign, cultural
- Location: New York, New York, U.S.
- Founder: Erica Rose; Elina Street
- Key people: Lea DeLaria; The Katz Company
- Established: 28 October 2020
- Website: www.lesbianbarproject.com

The Lesbian Bar Project is a campaign created by Erica Rose and Elina Street to "celebrate, support, and preserve the remaining lesbian bars in the US." The project launched on October 28, 2020 with a PSA video narrated by Lea DeLaria that announced a 30-day fundraising campaign to support what were thought to be the last 15 lesbian bars left in the country, many of which were financially threatened by the COVID-19 pandemic. A second phase followed in June 2021 in connection with Pride Month, including the release of a short documentary, and a three-part docuseries was released on National Coming Out Day 2022.

== History ==
Lesbian bars have been in decline across the United States since the 1980s, with more than two hundred having closed due to demographic changes, the wage gap and other city-specific reasons. The Lesbian Bar Project was created by New York City-based filmmakers Elina Street and Erica Rose. In fall 2020 the friends reminisced about one of their last night's out at Brooklyn lesbian bar Ginger's before it shuttered due to the COVID-19 pandemic. They decided to create a fundraiser to provide financial support to lesbian bars across the country. They also noted that the number of bars has dwindled, as there were approximately 200 lesbian bars in the United States in the 1980s and few remained.

On October 28, 2020, the Project was announced with a YouTube PSA video co-directed by Rose and Street and narrated by Lea DeLaria. The video launched a 30-day fundraising campaign, which featured photographs of the bar interiors and testimonials from the owners. The fundraiser closed on November 26, 2020. By October 2020, they project had raised $260,000.

Virtual events for the project are ongoing, with proceeds going to the Lesbian Bar Project Pool Fund, which are distributed between the 13 participating lesbian bars, as two (Sue Ellen's and Pearl Bar) opted out of receiving funds. Among these virtual events was a November 2020 episode of the podcast Dyking Out, which featured performances from comedians including Lea Delaria, Sydnee Washington, and Cameron Esposito.

== Documentaries ==
In 2020, the directors announced plans to develop a series of documentaries to highlight lesbian bars throughout America, with a longer term goal of international features. In June 2021, for Pride Month, Street and Rose released a short documentary on YouTube titled The Lesbian Bar Project with executive producer Lea Delaria and sponsorship from Jägermeister. On October 11, 2022, National Coming Out Day, a three-part docuseries with DeLaria as executive producer was released on The Roku Channel, with a focus on one bar in each episode of the series.

== Producers ==
The Lesbian Bar Project is produced in collaboration with Jägermeister through its Save the Night campaign.

== Featured bars ==
These bars were identified by the Lesbian Bar Project as the last 15 lesbian bars in the United States, although other sources put the number at 21. As of 2026, the website itself lists 36 operational lesbian bars.

== Operational ==
Name	Est.	About	Image
A League of Her Own (Washington, D.C.)			
Cubbyhole (New York City)			Cubbyhole (New York City)
Ginger's (New York City)			
Gossip Grill (San Diego, California)			
Henrietta Hudson (New York City)			Henrietta Hudson (New York City)
Lipstick Lounge (Nashville, Tennessee)			
My Sister's Room (Atlanta, Georgia)			
Pearl Bar (Houston, Texas)			
Slammers (Columbus, Ohio)			
Sue Ellen's (Dallas, Texas)			
Walker's Pint (Milwaukee, Wisconsin)			
The Wildrose (Seattle, Washington)			

=== Since closed ===
- Herz (Mobile, Alabama), closed 2023
- Toasted Walnut (Philadelphia, Pennsylvania), closed early 2021
- Blush & Blu (Denver, Colorado), closed October 2024

== Subsequent additions ==
After the Project was launched, the co-directors named lesbian bars they initially overlooked:

- Alibi's, Oklahoma City, Oklahoma, which subsequently closed in 2024.
- Babes of Carytown, Richmond, Virginia
- Boycott Bar, Phoenix, Arizona
- Cash Nightclub and Lounge, Phoenix, Arizona
- Frankie's OKC, Oklahoma City, Oklahoma
- Wild Side West, San Francisco, California

Since the project was launched, additional lesbian bars have opened. They include:

- Arcana Bar and Lounge, Durham, North Carolina
- As You Are, Washington, D.C.
- The Back Door, Bloomington, Indiana
- Boyfriend Co-op, Brooklyn, New York
- The Bush, Brooklyn, New York
- Dani's Queer Bar, Boston, Massachusetts
- Dorothy, Chicago, Illinois
- Femme Bar, Worcester, Massachusetts
- Home Base Tavern, Cincinnati, Ohio
- Honey's, Los Angeles, California
- Jolene, San Francisco, California
- The Lady's Room, Largo, Florida
- Last Ditch, Greenfield, Massachusetts
- Mother, San Francisco, California; a femme-focused queer bar
- Nobody's Darling, Chicago, Illinois
- The Pearl, Denver, Colorado
- The Ruby Fruit, Los Angeles, California
- Scarlet Fox Wine Bar, San Francisco, California
- The Sports Bra, Portland, Oregon
- Unicorn Bar, Kingston, New York
- Yellow Brick Road Pub, Tulsa, Oklahoma

There are 36 open lesbian bars in the United States as of 2026. 20 of the highlighted bars were a part of Krista Burton's 2023 book, Moby Dyke.
