= Lipstick Lounge =

Bar in East Nashville, Tennessee, US

- Interactive map of Lipstick Lounge
- Address: 1400 Woodland St; East Nashville, Tennessee; United States
- Coordinates: 36.17703°N 86.74574°W
- Owner: Christa Suppan and Jonda Valentine

Construction
- Opened: September 2002

Website
- thelipsticklounge.com

Lipstick Lounge, also known as The Lip, is a karaoke bar in East Nashville, Tennessee in the United States, co-owned by Christa Suppan and Jonda Valentine. While it is lesbian-owned, it calls itself a "bar for humans" and is welcoming to anyone. It opened in a 125-year-old building on Woodland Street in September 2002, which Suppan bought in 2003. It is one of fewer than twenty remaining lesbian bars in the United States.

== See also ==
- Lesbian Bar Project
