= Mary's First and Last Chance =

Historic lesbian bar in Oakland, California

Mary’s First and Last Chance

Restaurant information
- Location: 2278 Telegraph Avenue, Oakland, California, U.S.
- Coordinates: 37.812459°N 122.268600°W

Mary’s First and Last Chance (c. 1948 – 1956) was a lesbian and gay bar located at 2278 Telegraph Avenue in Oakland, California, U.S. It was once the focus of the 1950s California Supreme Court lawsuit Vallerga v. Dept. Alcoholic Bev. Control, when the bar challenged a state law for the right to serve gay patrons and won in 1959.

The bar was opened in c. 1948 by Mary Azar, and her brother-in-law, Albert L. Vallerga. Mary’s First and Last Chance liquor license suspended several times and ultimately revoked in 1956 based on a discriminatory 1955 California state law, and after undercover officers posed as patrons. In December 1959, the court sided with Azar and Vallerga and reversed the revocation, and in a historic decision, the 1955 law was declared unconstitutional.

== See also ==
- List of lesbian bars
