= Blush & Blu =

Lesbian bar in Denver, Colorado, U.S.

- Interactive map of Blush & Blu
- Address: 1526 East Colfax Avenue; Denver, Colorado; U.S.
- Coordinates: 39°44′23.5″N 104°58′8.5″W
- Owner: Jody Bouffard
- Type: Lesbian bar

Construction
- Opened: 2012

Website
- blushbludenver.com

Blush & Blu was a lesbian bar located on East Colfax Avenue in Denver, Colorado. It was the city's last lesbian bar, down from a peak of seven, and one of approximately thirty-three remaining in the United States.

Blush & Blu was owned by Jody Bouffard who previously owned tHERe Coffee Bar and Lounge from 2005 to 2011 and Her Bar from 2008 to 2011. Bouffard also worked at a bar called The Elle. In 2012, she reacquired tHERe Coffee Bar and Lounge's space, which she reopened as Blush. It gained its current name in 2013 following an expansion, which also included Voodoo Doughnut's first Colorado location.

Bouffard is also an artist, and her work decorates the bar's space.

Blush & Blu closed in October 2024 and at the time was Colorado's last lesbian bar. Reports indicated the space would be used by a gay bar operated by Bouffard

== Controversies ==
In 2021 a lawsuit was filed against Blush and Blu by three former employees who allege owner Jody Bouffard routinely failed to pay them minimum wage, stole tips during shifts and discriminated against one of the establishment's only Black employees, among other issues alleged in the suit.

== See also ==
- Lesbian Bar Project
