= Last Ditch Bar =

Lesbian bar in Greenfield, Massachusetts

- Interactive map of Last Ditch Bar
- Former names: The Root Cellar, 10 Forward
- Location: Greenfield, Massachusetts, U.S.
- Coordinates: 42.5873921°N 72.6025794°W
- Capacity: 100
- Type: Lesbian bar

Construction
- Opened: April 2025

Website
- lastditchvenue.com

Last Ditch is a lesbian bar and performing arts venue in Greenfield, Massachusetts. It opened in 2025 and hosts live music, drag performances, karaoke, dance parties, film screenings, and other events. The bar is noted for its ban on law enforcement; police were forbidden from entering the venue. In September 2026, the bar made national headlines over a mask policy controversy. In late October 2026, the bar announced its soft closure with regular operations to cease while booked events continue.

== Mission and atmosphere ==
Last Ditch describes its mission in terms of community care, mutual aid, and opposition to discrimination. The bar welcomed, prior to its soft closure, "dykes, transsexuals, gender freaks, workers, and their friends." The venue had stated that poor and unhoused people were welcome at no cost and that police were not permitted inside the venue. The bar was run through a mix of paid and volunteer labor.

Through its free store, the bar provides clothes, safer sex supplies, information about harm reduction, COVID-19 related personal protective equipment, and LGBTQ literature. The bar also has a native plant garden.

The bar is located in a basement beneath a Mexican restaurant. Becca Williams of Go Magazine described the interior of the bar as having an "eclectic, quirky feel", highlighting the varied furniture and decor. Carolyn Brown of the Daily Hampshire Gazette described it as a "quirky hodgepodge". The bar's owners sourced its furnishings through Facebook Marketplace, Craigslist, and items they found discarded at the side of the road.

Writing in August 2025, Dana Piccoli of News Is Out described the bar as "reminiscent of the heyday of spaces for queer women, full of variety and opportunity, while not being anchored in a major city".

== History ==
The bar was founded by Asa Rosario, Jackie Matellian, and Sage Territo. It was established as a queer community space following the closure of other LGBTQ-oriented venues in the area. Territo has cited Leslie Feinberg's novel Stone Butch Blues as an inspiration for the project.

=== Development, opening and fundraising ===
Prior to opening the bar, the three founders had been reflecting on the history, significance, and purpose of lesbian bars and their desire to establish a community-oriented space. Rosario, Matellian, and Territo purchased the venue with the support of a loan from the Franklin County Community Development Corporation.

In January 2025, the city's Board of License Commissioners approved the bar's liquor license. Prior to opening, the nearest such bar had been Femme Bar in Worcester, Massachusetts. Last Ditch opened in April 2025 at 10 Fiske Ave in Greenfield, Massachusetts.

The owners had initially considered naming the venue in honor of other bars that had since closed. However, on the advice of older community members, they decided not to. Wanting to integrate a pun into the name, the owners settled on "ditch" as a synonym for the literal non-slang meaning of the word "dyke" in some dialects.

In April 2026, the bar's owners asked for financial support from the public via a fundraising campaign. This fundraiser had an initial goal of $4,000 which was later raised to $12,500. As of September 25, 2026 the fundraiser had reached 81% of its target. The money is intended to pay the venue's rent, pay staff, support maintenance and repairs, and purchase an air purifier.

As of September 2026, Matellian was the only founder left operating the venue. The other two founders left the bar, citing health issues and pressures; one of the founders later enrolled in a clown school.

=== Prior venue use ===
In July 2016, Wendell Rheinheimer and Shana Totino first opened a music venue in the space named The Root Cellar. Sarah Lanzillotta and Paul LaBrecque then took on the venue in 2019, renaming it 10 Forward as a tribute to the bar on the USS Enterprise in the science fiction television series Star Trek: The Next Generation. Ang Buxton and Alex Noonan then became the venue's owners in 2022. At this time, the venue was "largely guided by the community" with the support of both paid workers and volunteers.

10 Forward had hosted karaoke nights, film events, queer networking events, raves, and DJ-ing classes. The venue had also positioned itself as an LGBTQ-friendly space. 10 Forward closed in 2024, shortly after Majestic Saloon, an LGBTQ+ bar in Northampton, had shut down.

=== Soft closure ===
On October 26 2026, the bar posted a message on their social media announcing their soft-closure. Although booked events such as concerts and drag performances will continue, the bar is otherwise closed for regular operations.

The bar had previously announced that it would be moving to a cooperative business model. However, a board of directors to manage the cooperative had not been established, without which the transition would not be possible.

The bar is seeking new owners. The sale of the bar, inclusive of furniture, equipment, inventory, and social media accounts, is estimated at a value of $70,000. Responding to the closure, the community and economic development director for Greenfield, Amy Cahillane, said "it is always a shame to lose a small business."

== Police ban ==
In September 2025, narcotics Detective Timothy Cooley noticed two people in a parked car, with one of them making a "swiping" motion indicative of snorting a substance. When Cooley approached the car, the two occupants left the vehicle and walked down different streets; where one of the occupants walked into Last Ditch. Cooley then called for backup and entered the bar, but found that the building was empty apart from a single bartender.

In response to this event, the bar announced on September 27 that "cops are not allowed at Last Ditch." The post, with an illustration of person throwing a Molotov cocktail, states that they "refuse entry and service to the pigs in all their forms" and plan to lock the doors when the police attempt to enter the bar on future attempts. The post also clarified because the bartender could not stop the police from entering the venue, all customers were asked to leave the bar.

… The Greenfield Police Department, when regulating someone’s liquor license, which can be observing to see if they are selling to minors, if they’re overselling, if they’re overserving patrons, if they’re serving within their permitted area [etc.] … has full authority to do that.

— Isaac Mass

The announcement raised legal questions on social media, as the city charter states that the duties for the Greenfield Police Department include enforcing local liquor license regulations. Attorney Isaac Mass, who was a former member of the Board of License Commissioners, states that license enforcement and emergencies are circumstances that require businesses to allow police entry.

Greenfield Police Chief Todd Dodge found that the message was "overtly aggressive" and took offense at the announcement using the word "pigs" to describe police officers.

== Mask policy ==
In September 2026, the bar made national headlines due to controversy concerning changes to its mask policy.

=== History of the bar's mask policy ===
The previous venue management, when the venue had operated as 10 Forward, had been in favor of attendees wearing face masks to reduce the risk of transmitting COVID-19. The venue had also installed a HEPA filter air purifier.

When Last Ditch Bar opened in 2025, the venue's mask policy required patrons to wear a well-fitted KN95 mask or better, unless they were eating, drinking, or performing.

=== Policy change controversy ===
In August 2026, Last Ditch announced that Saturday nights would become mask-optional while retaining its masking requirement on other nights due to a decline in patrons and revenue.

The policy change generated controversy among certain patrons and some members of the local queer community. Critics expressed concerns about its effect on immunocompromised and disabled patrons, while the venue said that the change was motivated by financial difficulties and the need to attract additional customers.

On September 3, the bar shared an apology for how it had announced the changes. The bar said that the policy change had been decided after meeting with members of the community, business advisers, and elders. In this statement, the bar reaffirmed its commitment to accessibility. The apology, which was posted on Instagram, was criticized for the lack of alt text; one comment stated that the post "...indicates the lack of care or interest in Disability intersectionality."

On September 11, the bar held a community meeting to discuss the policy change. One patron, attending by video link, accused the remaining owner, who had grown tearfully emotional, of deploying what the patron referred to as "white they/them tears" as an ostensibly racist and manipulative tactic. The remaining bar owner had become emotional while discussing the financial and personal burdens of running the bar alone, saying that her credit was damaged, she had lived in her truck for six months while putting money into the business, was working four jobs, and was responsible for repaying a $50,000 loan taken out by the three founders.

=== Virality and media attention ===
The controversy received national attention in September 2026, including coverage in The Boston Globe, which originated the story; New York Times; and the National Review. As the controversy gained increasing public attention, owners and workers from other nearby businesses expressed their support for the bar and its decision to alter its masking policy. On September 24, the bar issued a statement on Instagram, telling community members to "expect more details in the future" and decrying purported harassment against the patron who had accused the remaining owner of manipulation. The bar described the piece in The Boston Globe as "abysmal journalism, and a disorganised article".

Chloe Sargeant of Star Observer, analysing internet search trends and engagement, noted that the bar has attracted international attention because of "mass losses of dedicated spaces for lesbians and FLINTA" people being a relatable theme for "people all across the world".

Shane O'Neil, writing in The Washington Post, described the coverage of Last Ditch Bar on the social media platform TikTok as a "full-fledged phenomenon". O'Neil said that TikTok users' engagement with discussions concerning the mask policy controversy were "remarkable in the volume of content and breadth of reactions". Greenfield City Council President Lora Wondolowski expressed concern about how the media attention would affect the bar. She said, "We don't want this to make people rethink making a commitment to this community." The Western Massachusetts Club of the Communist Party USA issued a statement condemning the negative media attention that the bar had received.

As part of increased media attention, the bar had been visited by reporters from The New York Times, New York Post and The Daily Telegraph. A reporter from The Recorder was told by venue security that "members of the press were not welcome". The bar cited "infiltration and coercion by media" alongside "increased safety concerns" as reason to introduce "new security measures".

The Boston Globe article on the bar became one of the most-read stories the paper had ever published, and garnered many thousands of subscriptions according to the paper. The Hollywood Reporter said that discussions had begun in September 2026 regarding potential adaptations of the article, as a documentary or drama.

=== Commentary ===
The mask policy change controversy resulted in a range of think pieces and commentary. Alex Bollinger, writing in LGBTQ Nation, said that "One thing that stood out in the Last Ditch story is how often the bar's critics relied on strained accusations of racism and ableism to both get their way and to silence those who disagreed with them." He also cited the backlash to the policy change as an example of "lateral violence", a term used to describe where members in a community fight other community members instead of their supposed oppressors. Rebecca Spiess of The Boston Globe said that the bar's critics "have mastered an ability to leverage identity politics into cudgels to smash people with."

In Quillette, Julie Bindel argued that the controversy reflected a longstanding pattern in lesbian activism in which what she deemed an "obsessive" and "odd" preoccupation with illness and disability access become sources of ideological conflict, drawing parallels with disputes in the feminist movement of the 1980s. Writing in The Guardian, Arwa Mahdawi reflected on the public attention surrounding the policy change and said that "Stories of progressives leaning into all the most extreme stereotypes are guaranteed to be turned into parables of why leftists are self-absorbed drama queens who can't get anything done."

In The Atlantic, Helen Lewis described the mediation process as involving a “mimophant." Often credited to the author Arthur Koestler, a "mimophant" is a term used for an individual who, in Lewis' description, exhibits “the hide of an elephant when criticizing others, but the delicate skin of a mimosa flower when criticized themselves.” She applied the term to a complaining patron who, she wrote, emphasized his own feelings of “pain” while criticizing the owner for becoming emotional after sustained criticism. An opinion-piece in The Republican said "The drama made for entertaining if cold-hearted reading, allowing the public to gawk at a subculture people don’t often get to see, plus laugh at the missteps of bar owners, who have been punished for poor business sense and extending too much kindness."

Writing for Xtra Magazine, nonbinary journalist Oliver Haug argued that the story "should have never left the group chat" and would likely "lead to internet-bullying campaigns and pit already-marginalized people against one another." Slate's writer said "They deserve better than what they’re getting: an internet-enabled pile-on that has made them a villain to unreasonable purists on the left and culture-war fodder to bigots on the right." Aliyy Azad Malik, writing in QueerAF, reflected a month after the controversy that the viral attention to the bar had been "exploitative". Azad Malik contrasted The Boston Globe having "greatly profited" and experiencing a "surge in subscriptions" with "selling a prejudiced and lazy queer stereotype, of an unstable and hostile community".

== See also ==
- List of lesbian bars
- Lesbian Bar Project
