= Dani's Queer Bar =

Restaurant information
- Established: 2024
- Location: 907 Boylston Street, Boston, Massachusetts, 02115, United States
- Website: danisqueerbar.com

Dani's Queer Bar is a lesbian bar founded in 2024, in Boston, Massachusetts, U.S..

== Background ==
The number of lesbian bars declined across the United States from a high of around 200 in the 1980s to approximately 16 by early 2020, and Boston did not have a lesbian bar. In the first half of the 2020s, more than a dozen new bars geared toward queer women opened across the country. In August 2023 Boston Mayor Michelle Wu created a grants program, Supporting Pandemic Affected Community Enterprises (SPACE), to distribute American Rescue Plan funding.

== History ==
Owner Thais Rocha had been holding popup events for queer women and in March 2022 started fundraising to open a permanent space. In 2023 the business was a recipient of one of the city's first SPACE grants. The bar was originally planned to open in 2023 but was pushed back by permitting and inspections delays. When an Irish bar in the space next door offered to help by hosting a Pride Day party in June 2024, it received online backlash in the form of one-star reviews.

It opened in September 2024 on Boylston Street in Boston’s Back Bay neighborhood; the former tenant, also a bar, had closed in 2020 due to the pandemic.

== See also ==
- Lesbian Bar Project
- List of lesbian bars
