= Gossip Grill =

Culturally significant and historical lesbian bar in San Diego, Ca

Bar
Gossip Grill

Restaurant information
- Established: 2009
- Owner: Moe Girton
- Location: 1220 University Avenue, San Diego, California, 92103
- Website: https://gossipgrill.com/about-us/

Gossip Grill is a lesbian bar located in the Hillcrest neighborhood of San Diego, California. Founded in 2009, amid the decline of lesbian bars across the US, it is now one of just two in Southern California.

Gossip Grill is one of just 21 women-focused bars in the United States. Gossip Grill was voted best LGBTQ+ Bar in San Diego in 2025 and 2026.

Gossip Grill was founded by Moe Girton after she "accidentally turned" the gay bar she worked at into a women's bar. In 2021, Girton was selected as a Community Grand Marshall in the San Diego Pride parade, due in large part to the cultural impact of Gossip Grill.

The bar was included in the Lesbian Bar Project documentary and has been cited in general discourse about the decline and preservation of LGBTQ+ women's spaces in the US.

Gossip Grill drew national attention in October of 2023, when it suffered a suspected arson attack - causing unease in the gay community of Hillcrest and beyond. Following the fire, bars in the Hillcrest area increased security, and even purchased a license-plate reader, to dissuade those who might consider hate crimes on areas businesses. The bar was also featured in Greggor Mattson's Who Needs Gay Bars?, which specifically highlights the rarity of a "woman-forward" bar, particularly in the San Diego area.

Inspired by the historic San Diego Blood Sisters – a group of lesbian activists who organized blood drives to support gay men during the AIDS crisis – Gossip Grill launched the Hillcrest Blood Program, hosting regular blood drives in partnership with the American Red Cross.
