= Summit Station (lesbian bar) =

American lesbian bar in Columbus, Ohio (1971–2008)

- Interactive map of Summit Station

Restaurant information
- Established: 1971
- Closed: 2008
- Previous owner: Petie Brown
- Location: 2210 Summit Street, Columbus, Ohio

Summit Station was the first and one of the longest running lesbian bars in Ohio.

== History ==
In 1971, Summit Station originally opened as Jack's A Go-Go. It was also known as Logan's off Broadway. Summit Station was considered "the largest women's bar in Columbus” by the 1980s. Summit Station was owned the longest by Petie Brown, who took ownership in 1980 from Clida and Don Logan.

Summit Station was the primary bar for one of the earliest drag king troops, HIS Kings, who launched the International Drag King Extravaganza (IDKE).

Summit Station closed in 2008.

== Legacy ==
After Summit Station closed, the building was converted into a concert venue called The Summit Music Hall the next year. On June 10, 2023, the Ohio History Connection dedicated a historical marker at the former site of Summit Station at 2210 Summit Street in the University District. The marker was the first Ohio Historical Marker in Columbus recognizing the LGBTQ+ history and the third recognizing LGBTQ+ history in the state of Ohio.
