= Toasted Walnut =

Philadelphia lesbian bar (2016 – 2021)

Toasted Walnut Bar and Kitchen
- Interactive map of Toasted Walnut Bar and Kitchen
- Address: 1316 Walnut Street; Philadelphia, Pennsylvania; United States
- Coordinates: 39°56′56.6″N 75°9′46.3″W
- Type: Lesbian bar

Construction
- Opened: 2016
- Closed: 2021

Toasted Walnut Bar and Kitchen, better known as Toasted Walnut, was a lesbian bar at 1316 Walnut Street in Philadelphia, Pennsylvania from 2016 until its closure in early 2021.

== History ==
The bar and nightclub was operated by Denise Cohen who had a long career in Philadelphia's lesbian bars, including Hepburn's and Sisters. Chopped winner Diana Sabater was the opening chef and from its inception, Toasted Walnut focused on being open and inviting to all, rather than marketing itself specifically to lesbians, although it simultaneously sought to fill the void left by Sisters' closure two years prior.

As a result of Toasted Walnut's closure, there are only fourteen lesbian bars remaining in the United States as of 2021.

== See also ==
- Lesbian Bar Project
- LGBT culture in Philadelphia
