= Babes of Carytown =

Lesbian bar

Coordinates: 37.55387°N 77.48236°W

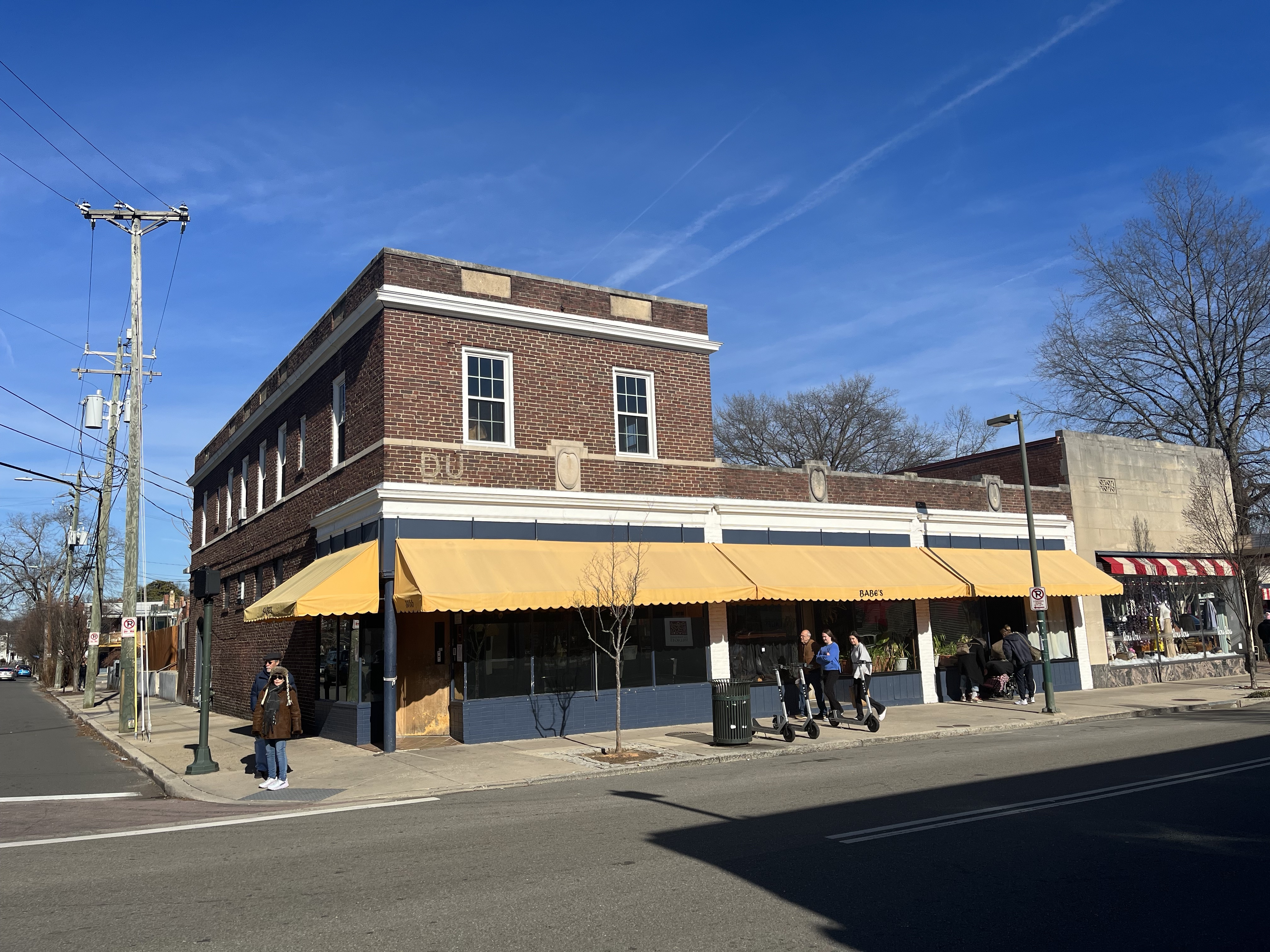
- Interactive map of Babes of Carytown
- Address: Richmond, Virginia; U.S.
- Type: LGBTQ bar

Construction
- Opened: 1979

Babes of Carytown is an LGBTQ-friendly bar, founded in 1979 as a lesbian bar, and located in Richmond, Virginia. It is known for its beach volleyball court, live music, and drag shows. It is Richmond's only lesbian-focused bar, and one of only thirty-three remaining in the country. Additionally, it has now become the oldest lesbian bar on the east coast and the second oldest in the country.

From 2011 through 2016, it was the first place Reader's Pick in Style Weekly for Best Gay Bar. In 2017, Babes was inducted into the Style Weekly Hall of Fame. It then tied for first place as the Style Weekly Reader's Pick in 2018, and then was the first place Reader's pick from 2019 through 2021.

In 2017, it was selected by Thrillist as Virginia's best dive bar and in 2022 was recognized by Tasting Table as among the best LGBTQ bars in the nation.

In a 2017 report prepared for the Virginia Department of Historic Resources LGBTQ Heritage Working Group, Babes is described as "a rare survivor from the pre-1991 period, during which the Virginia Alcoholic Beverage Control Board regularly shut down establishments that served or employed LGBTQ individuals."

== See also ==
- Lesbian Bar Project
