= Moby Dyke =

2023 book by Krista Burton

- Author: Krista Burton
- Genre: Nonfiction
- Publisher: Simon & Schuster
- Publication date: June 6, 2023
- Pages: 320
- ISBN: 978-1-6680-0054-0

Moby Dyke is a 2023 book by Krista Burton that documents America's remaining lesbian bars and tries to identify the sources of the industry's decline amid a growing proportion of the population identifying as LGBTQ+. Burton visited each of the twenty bars profiled in the book at least twice.

Burton's interest in the industry's decline began in 2010 when she and her girlfriend sought out a Chicago lesbian bar shortly after moving to the city. During the COVID-19 pandemic, Burton was asked what she missed the most – dyke bars – and found an agent but then learned the depth of the industry's decline.

== Reception ==
A review for Publishers Weekly described Burton's book as "a witty cross-country tour of lesbian bars", praising the author's humor throughout it, as well as her observations on the decline of lesbian bars in the United States. Kirkus Reviews commented on Burton's writing style, which they called "bloglike" due to its inclusion of stream of consciousness prose, as well as the fact it is written more as a travel diary instead of an academic study. They concluded the review by calling Moby Dyke "a lighthearted, honest narrative about [the author's] messy adventure."
