= Slammers =

Lesbian bar in Columbus, Ohio

Slammers Bar & Pizza Kitchen
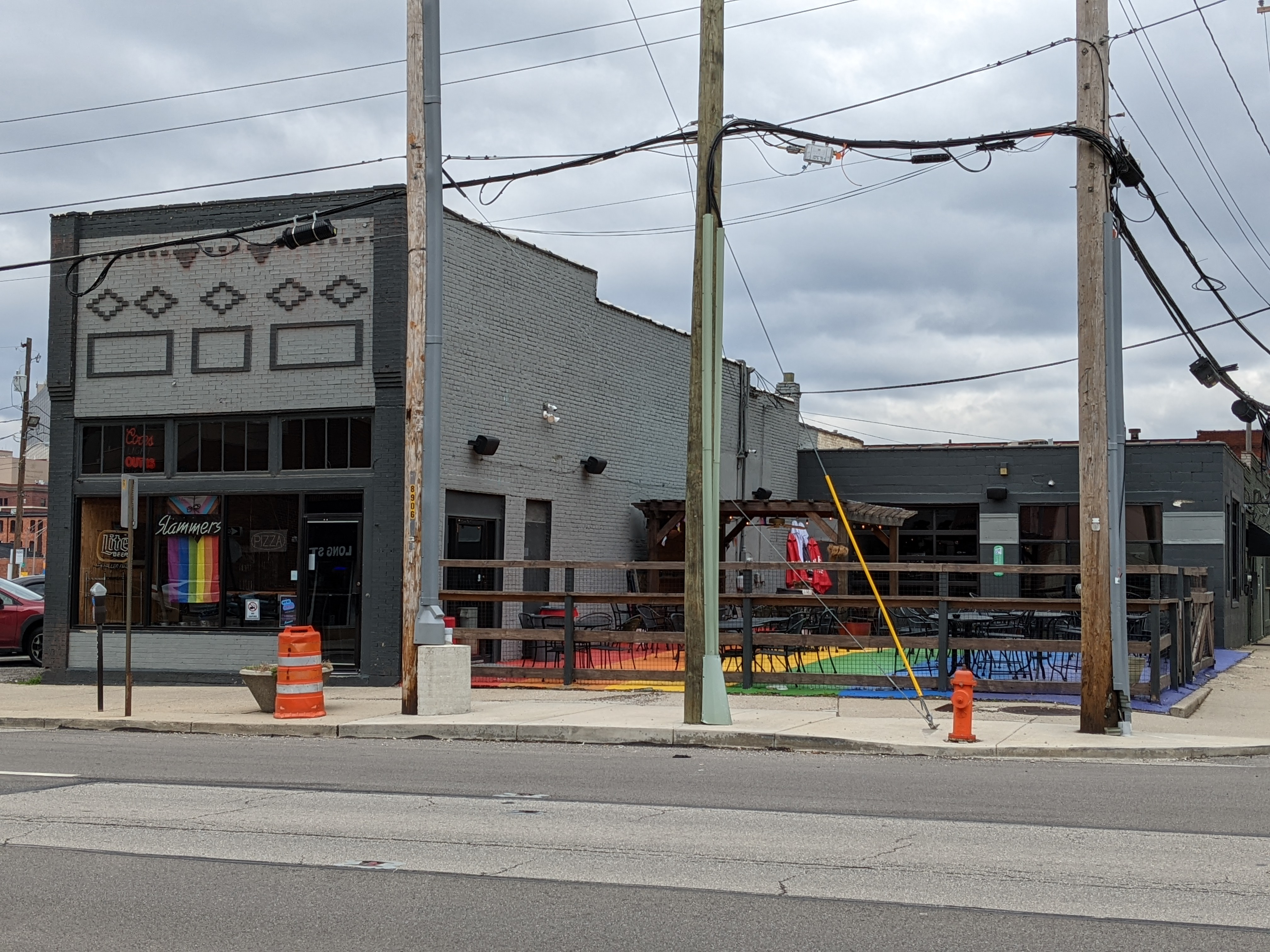
- Slammers Bar exterior in 2022
- Interactive map of Slammers Bar & Pizza Kitchen
- Address: Columbus, Ohio; U.S.
- Coordinates: 39°57′57″N 82°59′44.4″W
- Type: Lesbian bar

Construction
- Opened: 1993

Slammers Bar & Pizza Kitchen is a lesbian bar in Columbus, Ohio. Opened in 1993, it is one of Ohio's oldest gay bars and is still run by its original owner Marcia Riley. As of 2026, it is one of approximately thirty-six lesbian bars remaining in the country and the only one in Ohio. It was supported by the Lesbian Bar Project to help it survive the COVID-19 pandemic.

As has been the case with lesbian bars across the United States, Slammers has needed to evolve to adapt to the changing LGBTQ+ nightlife scene. While it began as a women's bar, early on it drew a business lunch crowd.

== Slammie's on High ==
In 2022, the owners of Slammers opened Slammie's on High, near the Ohio State campus, which is also an LGBTQ+ friendly space but serves different food to the original location. It opened in March 2023 and closed in June 2024.
