= Sue Ellen's =

Lesbian bar in Dallas, Texas, U.S.

- Sue Ellen's in 2026
- Interactive map of Sue Ellen's
- Address: 3014 Throckmorton Street, 75219; Dallas, Texas; United States
- Coordinates: 32°48′38.5″N 96°48′41.5″W

Construction
- Opened: 1989

Website
- Official website

Sue Ellen's is a lesbian bar in Dallas, Texas' gayborhood of Oak Lawn. It first opened in Dallas on January 19, 1989, and moved to its current Throckmorton Street location in 2008. Sue Ellen's, a two-story nightclub, has a long history of being part of Dallas' queer nightlife, and is the state's oldest lesbian bar.

It is named for Sue Ellen Ewing of Dallas fame and is considered the sister bar to nearby JR's.

== See also ==
- Lesbian Bar Project
