= Ginger's =

Bar in Brooklyn, New York

Coordinates: 40°40′16.8″N 73°59′3.3″W

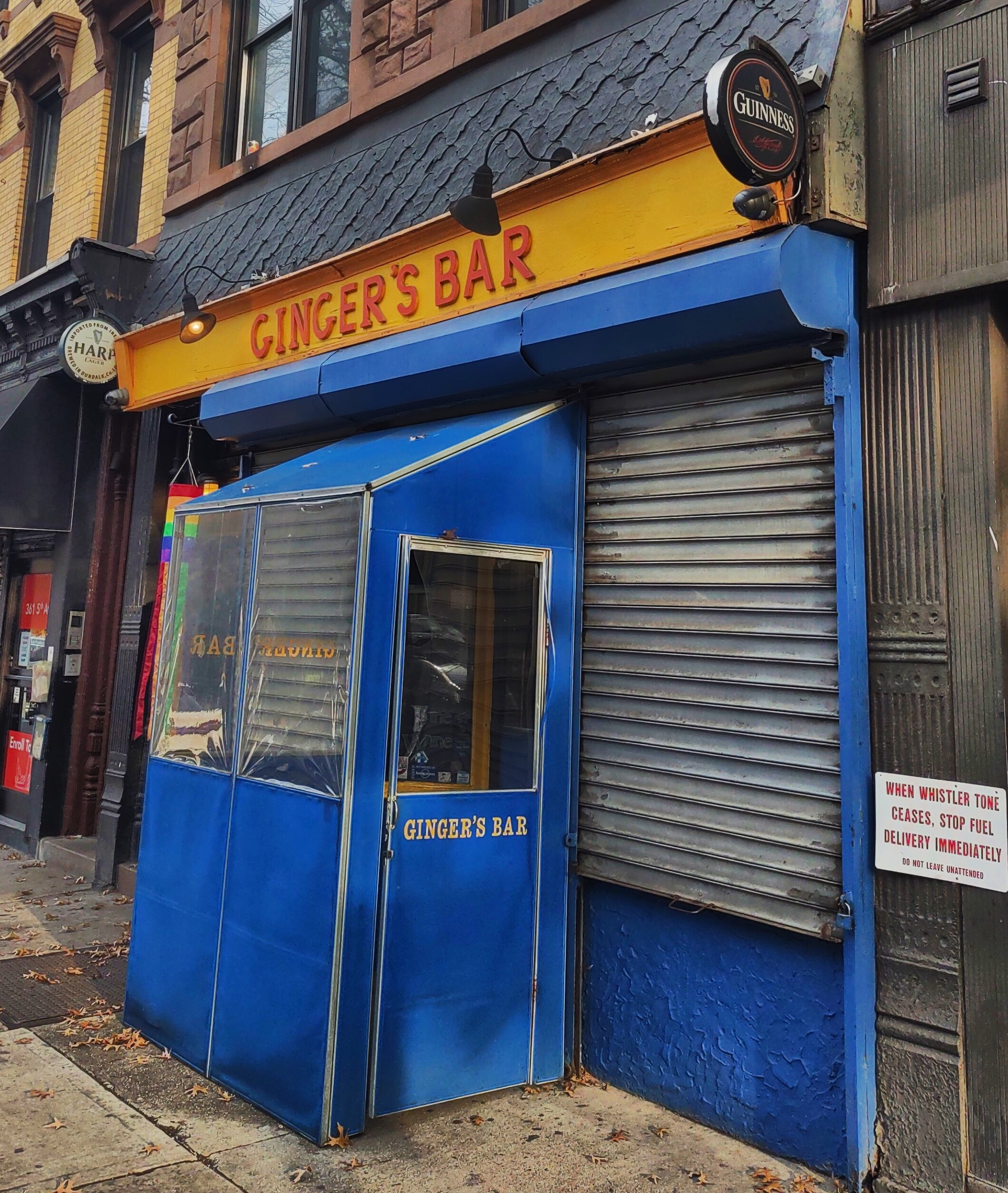
- Interactive map of Ginger's
- Address: 363 5th Ave, Brooklyn, 11215; New York City; U.S.
- Owner: Sheila Frayne, Brendan Donohoe
- Type: Bar
- Public transit: New York City Subway: at Fourth Avenue/Ninth Street station NYCT Bus: B63, B61, B103

Construction
- Opened: March 17, 2000

Ginger's is an Irish dive and lesbian bar in Park Slope, Brooklyn, New York City. It is one of the two queer-oriented bars in Park Slope, with the other being Good Judy. The bar was opened by Sheila Frayne on Saint Patrick's Day in 2000 and is seen as both a lesbian bar and a woman-friendly neighborhood bar.

== History ==
Ginger’s was opened by Sheila Frayne on March 17, 2000. The bar shuttered during the COVID-19 pandemic and reopened on October 28, 2021, after a 19-month closure. In late 2021 Frayne brought on hospitality professional Brendan Donohoe as co-owner to help with the bar’s relaunch; fundraising efforts, landlord forbearance, and pandemic relief also supported the reopening.

Donohue opened Mary's Bar in 2023, a sister bar to Ginger's located in Greenpoint; the bar closed temporarily in November 2024, according to an Instagram post.

In February 2025, Ginger’s marked its 25th anniversary with a three-day festival over St. Patrick’s Day weekend, highlighting the role of lesbian and queer bars amid ongoing anti-LGBTQ+ pressures.

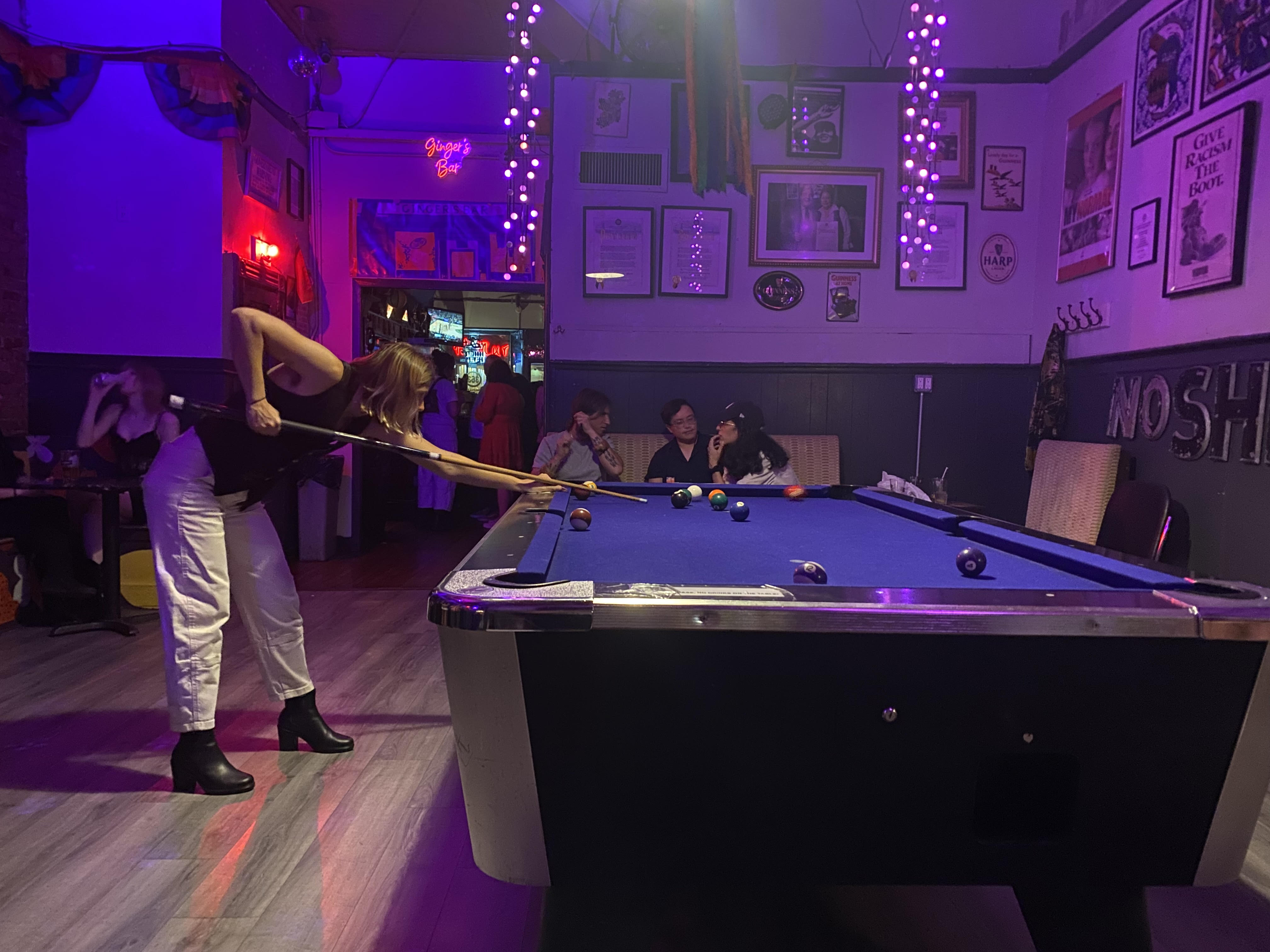
Pool table at Ginger's.

== Description and programming ==
Sources describe Ginger’s as an unpretentious, dive-style neighborhood bar with a front room and a pool table in back; the space also features an enclosed garden/patio. Regular programming has included karaoke, DJ nights, drag king shows, and other events aimed at lesbian and broader queer communities.

== Reception ==
Ginger’s has been included in New York magazine’s "Thousand Best" list and in multiple roundups of notable LGBTQ+ bars in New York City. The bar is frequently cited as a longstanding lesbian-focused space in Brooklyn nightlife coverage.

== See also ==
- Lesbian Bar Project
- List of dive bars
- LGBTQ culture in New York City
