= Arcana Bar and Lounge =

LGBTQ nightclub in Durham, North Carolina

- The bar in 2026
- Interactive map of Arcana Bar and Lounge
- Address: 331 W Main Street; Durham, North Carolina; United States
- Coordinates: 35.9965°N 78.9037°W
- Owner: Erin Karcher
- Type: Lesbian bar

Construction
- Opened: December 2015

Website
- www.arcanadurham.com

Arcana Bar and Lounge is an LGBTQ nightclub and bar in Durham, North Carolina. It is the only official lesbian bar in North Carolina recognized by the Lesbian Bar Project. It is located in the basement of the historic Snow Building.

== History ==
Erin Karcher and Lindsey Andrews opened Arcana as a tarot card cocktail bar in downtown Durham in December 2015. The bar is located in the basement of the historic Snow Building, with the main entrance on the rear of the building. Arcana is known for hosting tarot readings, burlesque shows, comedy shows, queer Dungeons & Dragons playing nights, "Dyke Night", queer craft night, and dance parties. From 2016 to 2021, Arcana hosted Super Secret Dance Party until it moved to The Fruit.

In 2023, Andrews left Arcana to start Night School Bar, leaving Karcher as the sole owner.

It was added to the Lesbian Bar Project's list in 2025, making it the only officially-recognized lesbian bar in North Carolina. It was the 32nd bar in the United States to be recognized by the Lesbian Bar Project.
