= Herz (lesbian bar) =

Defunct lesbian bar (2019–2023)

- Interactive map of Herz
- Address: 4070 Government Boulevard, Mobile, Alabama; U.S
- Coordinates: 30°38′13″N 88°8′33″W

Construction
- Opened: 2019
- Closed: 2023

Herz was a lesbian bar in Mobile, Alabama run by Rachel and Sheila Smallman and owned by Rachel Broughton. It opened on October 4, 2019, and was the only lesbian bar in Alabama and one of only four in the south. The owners had explored different cities and states and been thrown out of at least one gay bar for being women before selecting Mobile as the ideal location for their bar.

The bar was featured as part of the Lesbian Bar Project, an initiative to preserve and highlight the remaining lesbian bars in the United States, and Queer to Stay, an LGBTQ+ business preservation project.

On April 4, 2023, the bar announced its closure via social media.
