= Henrietta Hudson =

Queer restaurant and former lesbian bar in New York City, U.S.

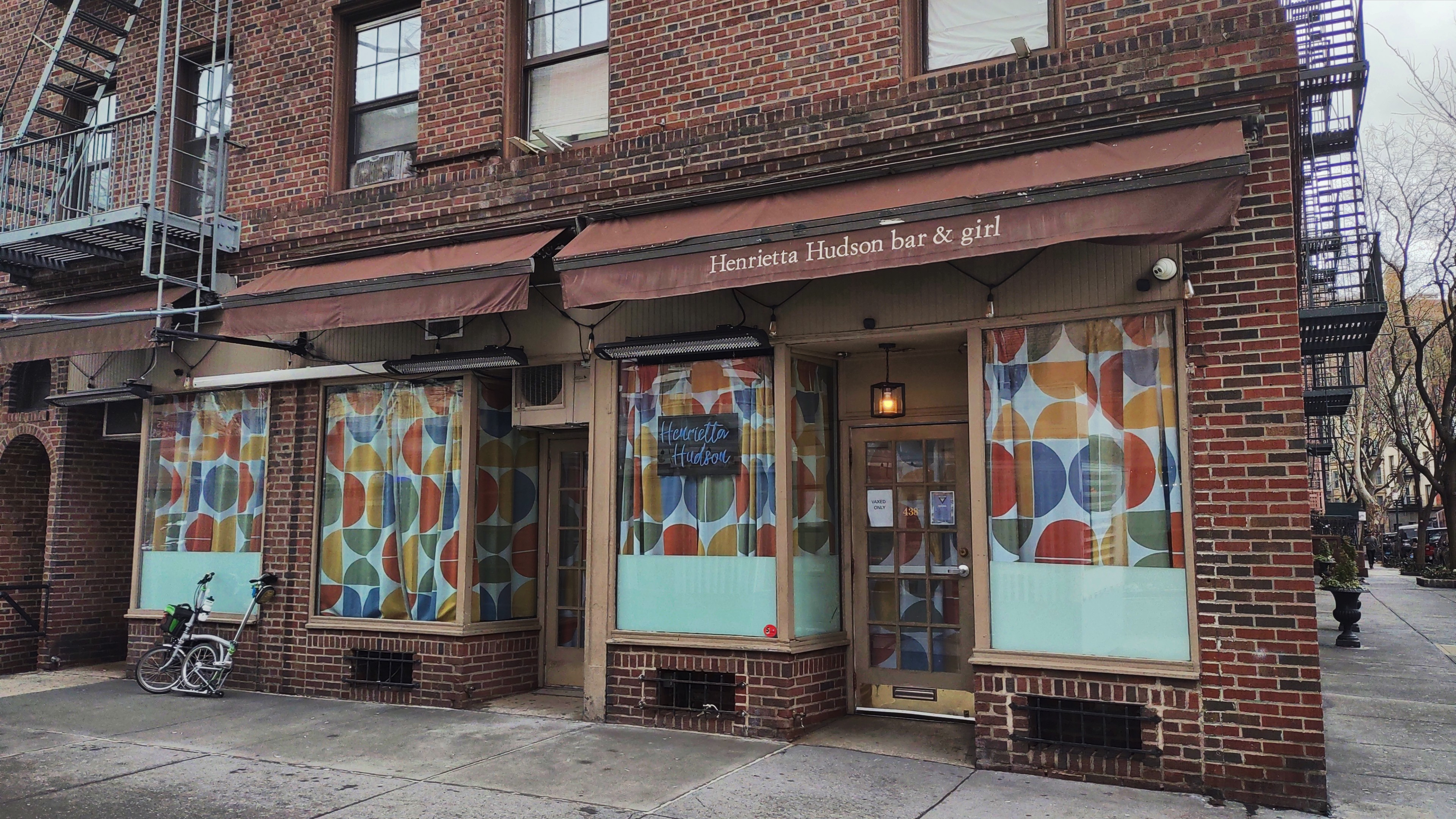
- Henrietta Hudson exterior in 2022
- Interactive map of Henrietta Hudson

Restaurant information
- Established: 1991
- Owner: Lisa Cannistraci
- Location: 438 Hudson Street, New York, New York, 10014, United States of America

Henrietta Hudson, originally named Henrietta Hudson Bar & Girl, is a queer restaurant and lounge in Manhattan's West Village neighborhood. It operated as a lesbian bar from 1991 to 2014. Until it rebranded in 2021, it was one of three remaining lesbian bars in New York City. Henrietta Hudson's location is the original location of the Cubbyhole bar, which had the distinction of being lesbian-owned and managed.

== History ==
Lisa Cannistraci and bar owner Minnie Rivera opened Henrietta Hudson in 1991 as a lesbian-centric bar. The name is a feminization of Henry Hudson, the namesake of the Hudson River. The establishment became New York City's longest-operating lesbian bar after the closure of other similar venues. Gay liberation icon Stormé DeLarverie was a bouncer at Henrietta Hudson well into her 80s.

Part of the bar's ongoing evolution included removal of the "lesbian bar" descriptor in 2014. In a 2019 interview, Lisa Cannistraci said she did not "care whether or not it is known specifically as a lesbian bar...I just want people to come and have a great experience." Following its closure due to the COVID-19 pandemic, Cannistraci announced plans to rebrand and expand Henrietta Hudson into a "café, lounge, bistro, coffee house, [and] cocktail place".

The rebranding, however, resulted in controversy due to Cannistraci soliciting financial contributions from lesbians with a "Save the Bar" crowdfunding for Henrietta Hudson, and also participating in the Lesbian Bar Project fundraising campaign to save lesbian bars, despite using the donations to reopen the venue as a "queer" space no longer catering exclusively to lesbians.

== See also ==
- LGBT culture in New York City
