= Damenklub Violetta =

Lesbian nightclub

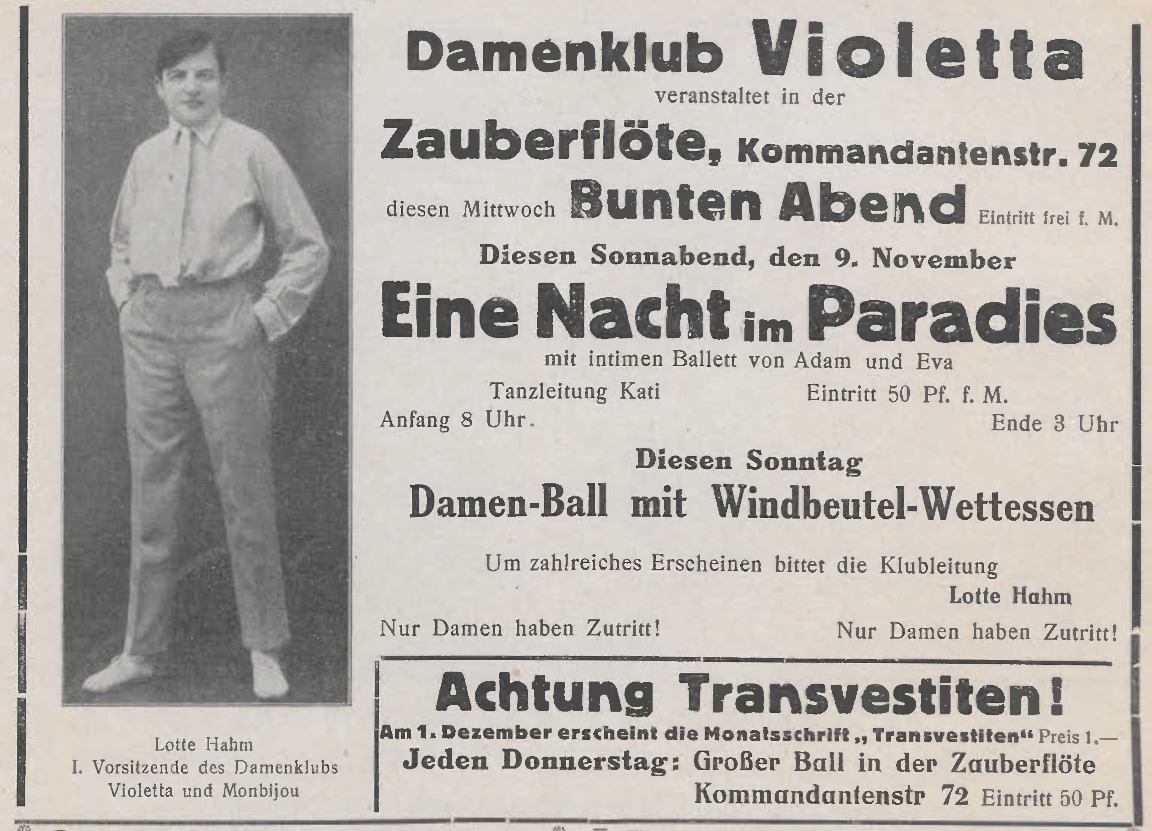
An advertisement for Damenclub Violetta, showing Lotte Hahm

The Damenklub Violetta (Ladies' Club Violetta, founded after 1926–1933) was one of the largest and most popular of numerous lesbian nightclubs and dance halls that existed in Berlin during Germany's Weimar Republic, with 400 regular members. It was owned and managed by Lotte Hahm.

== History ==
Organizer and activist Lotte Hahm founded Damenklub ('ladies club') Violetta in Berlin after her arrival in Berlin in 1926. The word "Violetta" (Violet) was a code word for lesbian. The club featured the "calling card ladies ball", "fashion shows for masculine women and transvestites", and singalongs of German LGBT pride anthem "The Lavender Song".

It was one of an estimated 50 lesbian clubs and bars in the city of Berlin at the time. The Violetta and other lesbian nightclubs "were the sites which brought women together and which facilitated lesbian identification".

Hahm's advertisements for the club and her other events in lesbian magazines featured photos of herself wearing a tuxedo, her hair very short. Famous women like comedian Claire Waldoff (1884–1957) and actress and feminist Senta Söneland (1882–1934) are said to have frequented the club. At the end of 1927, the Violetta was described as a "leading organization" in the magazine Frauenliebe (Women's Love).

In its beginning the Violetta had close ties to the Deutscher Freundschaftsverband (DFV), one of the two mass organizations of the German homosexual emancipation movement of the time. In 1929, Hahm merged 'Violetta' with another club, the same-sized 'Monbijou des Westens', run by Käthe Reinhardt, cutting its ties to the DFV and moving it under the roof of the even bigger Bund für Menschenrecht. The merger of the two big clubs and the change caused a great stir in the lesbian scene of the time; in Frauenliebe and DFV there was talk of betrayal and intrigue. In justification, Hahm wrote that it would have been considered "grotesque" that "a heterosexual man should be the leader of homosexual women, of all things" and, secondly, of financial irregularities by Bergmann. She summed up "that it was finally time for Karl Bergmann, who had founded the ladies' club Monbijou only to exploit it for his own personal purposes, to disappear." Some members splintered off to meet at another club, the 'Dorian Gray'.

As an activist, Hahm's goal for the Violetta was to use it as base for a nationwide lesbian and possibly also trans rights movement, which also included a correspondence network. She stated that the Violetta received "hundreds of letters" from women around Germany. "Not just dances and social events will bring you equality," she said, "you also have to fight if you want respect and dignity. The eagerness to fight must fill your hearts and shine in your eyes".

With the arrival of the Nazis to power, all of Berlin's lesbian clubs were shut down by 1933. Hahm, however, continued to organize lesbian and trans events in Berlin until the post-war period of the 1950s.
