= Candy Bar, Soho =

Former lesbian bar in London, England (1996–2014)

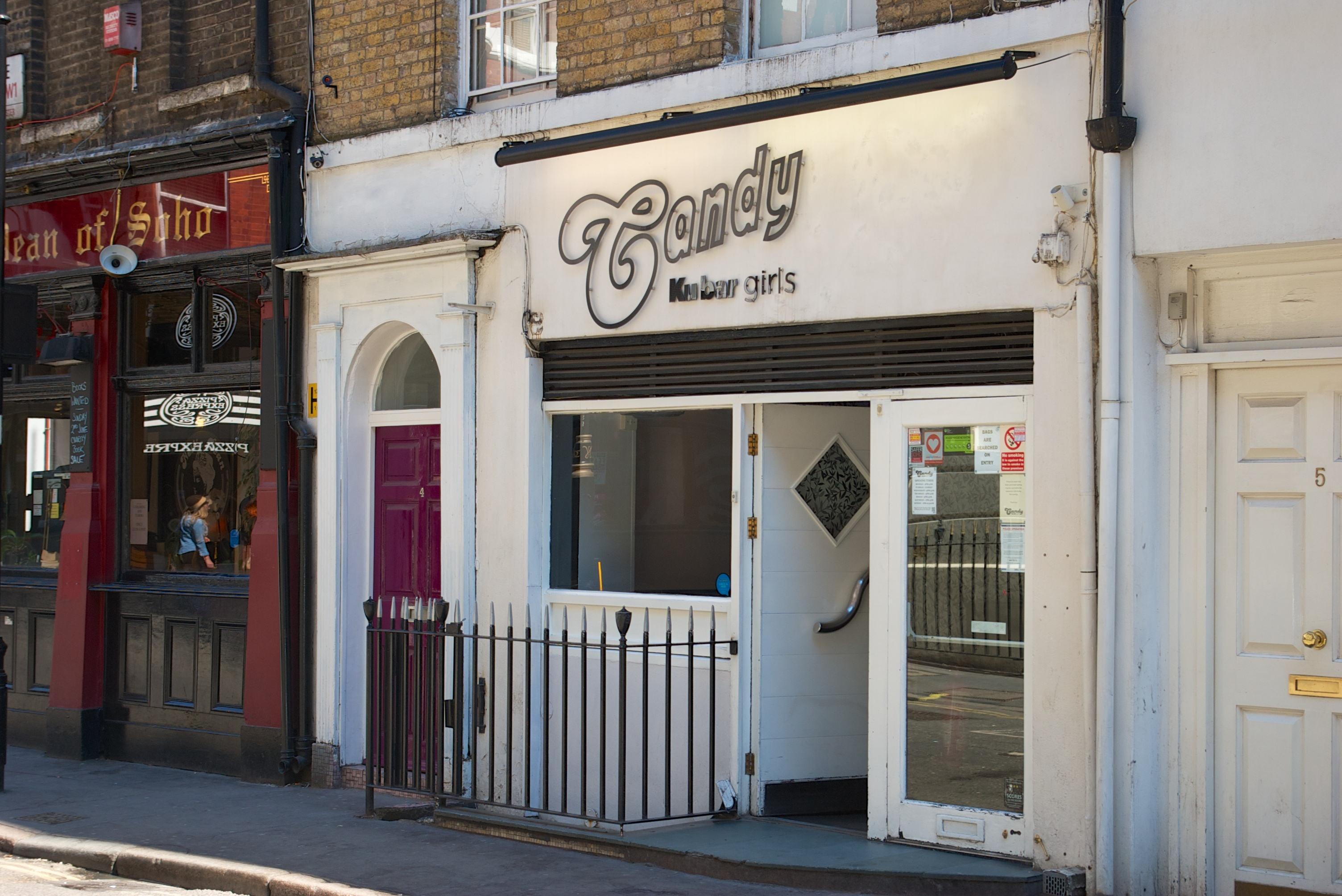
- The exterior of Candy Bar in 2013
- Coordinates: 51°30′53.64″N 0°8′0.96″W
- Founded: 1996
- Owner: Kim Lucas

Listed Building – Grade II
- Official name: 4, CARLISLE STREET W1
- Designated: 23-Nov-1978
- Reference no.: 1066346

Candy Bar was a lesbian bar that was based in Carlisle Street in Soho, London. It was started in 1996 by Kim Lucas who decorated the interior pink and provided lap and pole dancing. Men were allowed into the bar if accompanied by a woman.

In 2011, the bar was sold by Lucas to Gary Henshaw, owner of the Ku chain of London gay bars. New management brought in by Henshaw toned down the bright pink decoration. The bar was featured in a Channel 5 six-part fly-on-the-wall documentary series named Candy Bar Girls.

The bar closed in January 2014 following an increase in rents.
