= Just Marion & Lynn's =

Houston lesbian bar (1973–1987)

Just Marion & Lynn's, stylized "Just" Marion & Lynn's, was a gay bar that was opened in 1973 by Marion Pantzer and Lynn Hornaday in the Montrose neighborhood of Houston, Texas, United States. It was one of the first lesbian-oriented bars to open in Houston. The bar closed in 1987, one year after Pantzer was murdered.

== History ==
=== Opening ===
Marion Pantzer was born in 1919 and was a World War II army veteran. Lynn Hornaday was working at a stock brokerage firm just prior to opening the bar. Pantzer and Hornaday opened Just Marion & Lynn's on September 14, 1973, at 817 Fairview Street in the Montrose neighborhood of Houston. Although it was oriented towards LGBT women, men also attended the bar regularly, and Pantzer entertained customers by dressing up as a clown. In 1977, folk musician Casse Culver played at the bar. Alongside Pat Hall, Pantzer opened a second bar, Marion's Too, in 1978 at 109 Tuam Street in Houston; Marion's Too closed sometime the next year. Just Marion & Lynn's occasionally hosted Houston Gay Pride Week events and Let Us Entertain You weekends, such as Lee McCormick's performance in 1979 and Linda Gerard and Diane Marchal in 1982 and 1983.

Beginning in 1980, advertisements for the bar became less frequent. Pantzer was named a grand marshal for the 1983 Houston Gay Pride Parade on June 26. Then-mayor Kathy Whitmire declared April 28, 1985, to be Marion Pantzer Day, and later the same year, the bar moved to a new location at 903 Richmond Street. During the location change, the bar also went through an official name change to Just Marion's, due to Pantzer's and Hornaday's breakup shortly after the opening of the bar, although patrons and the media continued to use its original title.

=== Murder of Marion Pantzer ===
The area in which the bar was located became a popular crime target during the 1980s. Shortly after closing, at around 1 a.m. on March 11, 1986, two armed, masked men entered the bar with intent to rob it. One man, armed with a sawed-off .410 shotgun, threatened the bartender, Peaches. Pantzer, who always had a .25 automatic derringer pistol for self-defense, drew her gun, and fired. Accounts vary about from where Marion produced the gun; some witnesses say she pulled it out of her sweatshirt, while others say it was pulled out of her purse. The robbers returned fire, hitting Pantzer five times and rupturing Pantzer's aorta, and then fled. Pantzer was 67 years old at the time of her death.

Robert McGowen was later arrested and sent to death row for the murder of Pantzer, but he defended himself by saying his car had been used by his cousin, Charles McGowen, to commit the crime, and that Roger was not present; however, Charles was killed in a gunfight with police while committing another robbery a few months after Pantzer's death.

The Montrose community mourned Pantzer's loss. Her funeral was one of the most well-attended in Houston history. The hundreds of guests included Mayor Kathy Whitmire, drag queens, police officers, business owners, and other community members. The attendance was so large that a walking procession was led to reduce traffic. The Pantzer Reward Fund was established by the Houston Organization of Bar Owners immediately after the murder to help solve the case and other robberies in the area; the fund raised over $5,000. The Marion & Lynn Rebels, an LGBT women's softball team from Houston who named themselves after the bar, played in the 1986 Women's Gay World Series in New Haven, Connecticut.

The bar remained open after Pantzer's death, but it closed one year later in 1987.
