= My Sister's Room =

Lesbian bar in Georgia, United States

Coordinates: 33.784736°N 84.384800°W

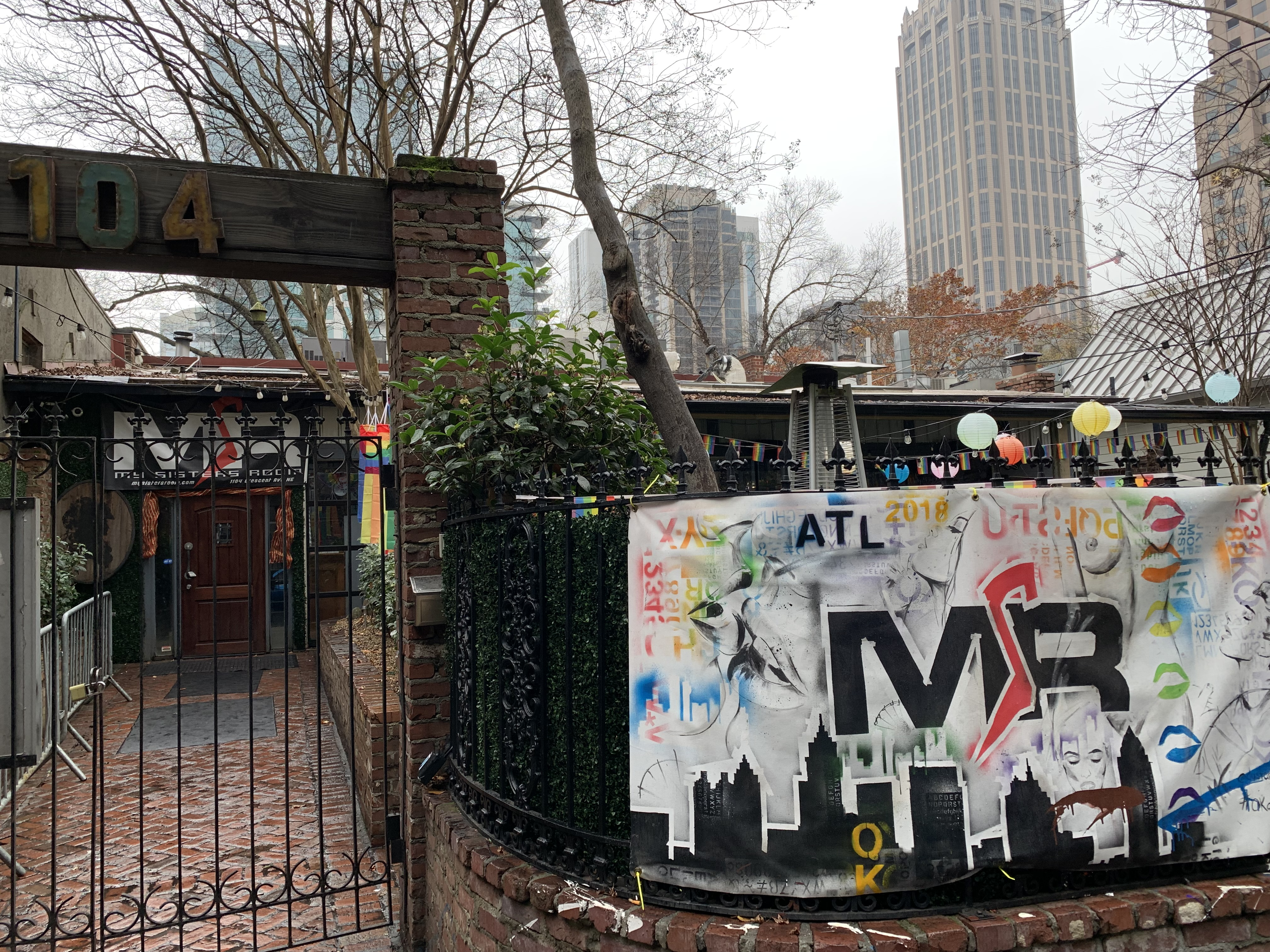
- Interactive map of My Sister's Room

Restaurant information
- Established: 1996
- Owner(s): Jen-Chase Daniels and Jami Siden (since 2011)
- Previous owner: Susan Musselwhite (1996-2011)
- Location: Atlanta, Georgia, United States

My Sister's Room (MSR) is a lesbian bar in Atlanta, Georgia. It is one of the few remaining lesbian bars in the nation and the longest running lesbian bar in Georgia. It was opened in 1996 and remains a lesbian-owned and operated bar but welcomes the entire LGBTQIA community. Pictures of My Sister's Room in the 1990s are in Emory University's permanent photo collection.

The owners credit their longevity to being a safe queer space with good vibes and intoxicating energy.

MSR originally was located in the Midtown area of Atlanta. It then moved to the popular lesbian Atlanta suburb Decatur, Georgia from 1997-2006 until the building was sold to build condos and they moved to the bar district of East Atlanta Village. In 2011 the bar was sold to Jen-Chase Daniels and Jami Maguire.

In the summer of 2015, My Sister's Room moved back to a larger space in the most LGBT-friendly part of Midtown Atlanta, also referred to as the "gayborhood". MSR has been forced to move locations 3 times in Midtown by buildings being torn down by developers. In 2022 They moved to their current 8000 sq ft spot, a two-story dance venue at 1104 Crescent Ave just blocks from Piedmont Park.

Their motto is “A Lesbian Bar Where Everyone is Welcome”

Events range from Drag shows, burlesque, comedy shows, king shows, bands pub crawls, karaoke, birthday parties, bachelorette parties and more. They strive to have “Something for Everyone “

MSR Host Gay Pride’s Official Women’s Events in October, Pride Pub Crawls in June and started the first Atlanta March for LGBTQ rights June 2016. Their deep history of Women/Lesbian trail blazing has made it a staple in the Queer community throughout the US. .

MSR established the Pensacola Memorial Weekend Pride event "Sexacola" that caters to lesbian party goers.
