= Cubbyhole (lesbian bar) =

Lesbian bar in Manhattan, New York, U.S.

Coordinates: 40°44′15.7″N 74°0′13.6″W

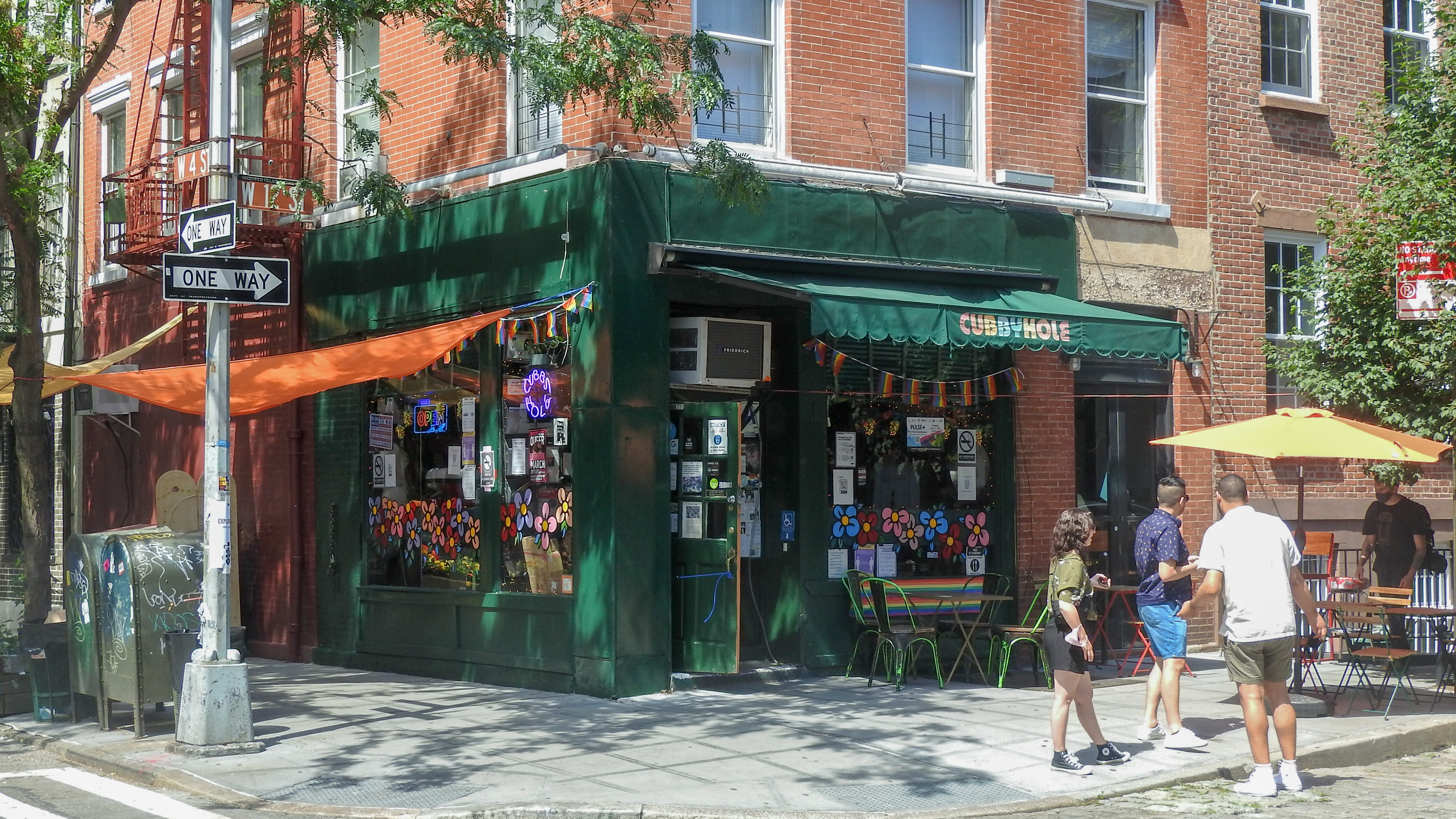
- Interactive map of Cubbyhole
- Address: 281 West 12th Street; New York City, New York; U.S.
- Type: Lesbian bar
- Public transit: New York City Subway: at 14th Street/Sixth Avenue station; at 14th Street/8th Avenue station; NYCT Bus: M14A, M20, M12,M11

Construction
- Opened: 1987

Website
- cubbyholebar.com

Cubbyhole, sometimes written as Cubby Hole or Cubby, in Manhattan's West Village, is one of New York City's three remaining lesbian bars as of 2022.

== History ==
The bar now known as Cubbyhole dates back to 1987 when it was owned and operated by Tanya Saunders and Debbie Fierro as a refuge for all comers under the name DT's Fat Cat. It has remained both a lesbian and queer friendly location throughout its history as bar patronage shifted throughout New York City's LGBTQ+ community. In 1994 Saunders bought the name Cubbyhole from the owner of an already-closed lesbian bar, and the bar has operated under that name since. It is owned and operated by Lisa Menichino who had been a bar-tender under Saunders' ownership.

Cubbyhole is at 281 W. 12th Street, the same location where Saunders operated DT's Fat Cat. The former Cubby Hole was located in what is now Henrietta Hudson.

While there was some concern in early 2022 when the bar closed for renovation, it reopened in spring.

== See also ==
- Lesbian Bar Project
- LGBT culture in New York City
