= Lesbian bar =

Drinking establishment catering to lesbians

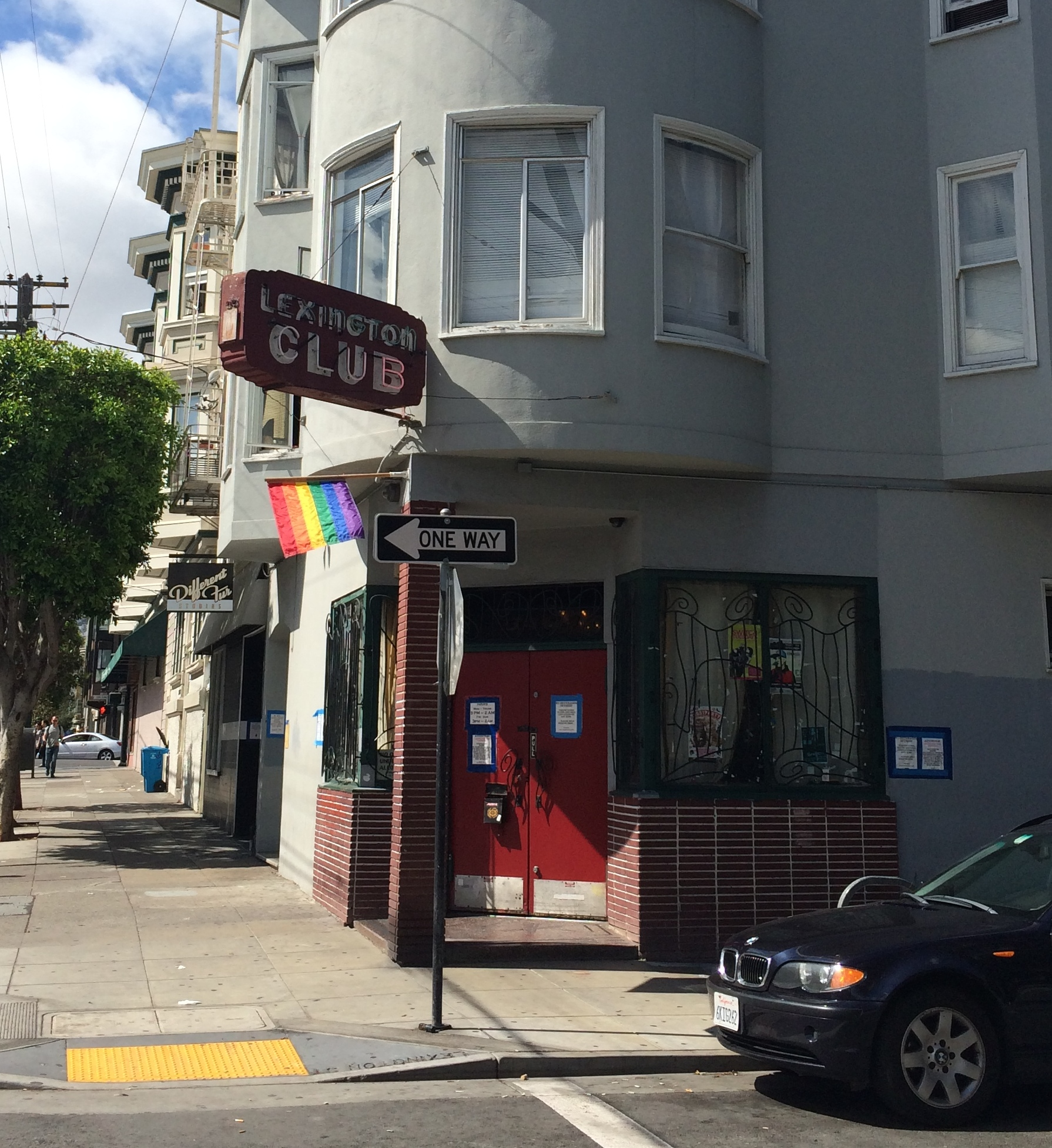
The Lexington Club (1997–2015), a.k.a. "The Lex", was a San Francisco lesbian bar

A lesbian bar (sometimes called a "women's bar") is a drinking establishment that caters exclusively or predominantly to lesbian women. While often conflated, the lesbian bar has a history distinct from that of the gay bar.

== Significance ==
Lesbian bars predate feminist spaces such as bookstores, coffeehouses, and contemporary LGBT services such as community centers and health care centers. While few lesbian-specific bars exist today, lesbian bars have long been sites of refuge, validation, community, and resistance for women whose sexual orientations are considered "deviant" or non-normative. They have been spaces for intergenerational community building, where women had the opportunity to come out without being "outed", which can result in the loss of jobs, family, and social status. They could, however, also be sites of intense isolation.

== History ==
While women in the United States were historically prohibited from frequenting alcohol-oriented public spaces, evidence suggests that lesbians engaged with bars in the 1800s. The Prohibition Era's speakeasies allowed women to drink freely publicly, and were especially beneficial for lesbians given their inconspicuous form. Though, during this era many women of color preferred women's only house parties to mitigate unwanted male attention or racial discrimination. They also turned to heterosexual bars because of racially segregated neighborhoods that barred their access to specifically queer spaces. Lesbian bars were predominantly operated by white owners with a focus on white demographics which doubly restricted Black visibility during a cultural climate which already threatened queer presence. It was not until the 1970s that specifically Black bars sprang up. White bars appropriated Black music for their own spaces, but Black bars reportedly got ahead of appropriative behaviors by leveling with newer music production and dance. By the 1980s there were Black lesbian-owned bar spaces that had emerged on the scene as well, such as Les Pierres in New Orleans. Les Pierres was owned and operated by the lesbian couple Juanita Pierre and Leslie Martinez, and it was the first Black lesbian-owned bar in the city.

Meanwhile, in Weimar Germany, lesbian bars and night clubs were numerous, especially in Berlin. Entrepreneur Elsa Conrad ran several venues which catered to a lesbian intellectual elite. Her bar Mali und Igel hosted guests such as Marlene Dietrich. Lotte Hahm was another lesbian activist of that era who created the popular bar Violetta and other events. In Paris during the 1920s, photographer Brassai brought attention to the underground lesbian bar scene with his photographs of customers at Le Monocle. Parisian bars and brasseries for lesbians were numerous in Montmartre as far back as the late 1800s and early 1900s; among them were Le Rat Mort, La Souris and the Hanneton.

San Francisco's Mona's 440 Club, which opened its doors in 1936, is widely considered to be the first lesbian bar in the United States. In the 1950s, bars began to emerge for working-class lesbians, white and black. Very characteristic of these (often referred to as "Old Gay") bars was binary heterosexist models of coupling and an enforcement of a (white) butch/femme or (black) stud/femme binary. Because of a lack of economic capital and segregation, house parties were popular among black lesbians. Lesbians who changed roles were looked down upon and sometimes referred to as "KiKi" or "AC/DC". Out of this early organizing of lesbians came the homophile movement and the Daughters of Bilitis.

Lesbian and gay identification and bar culture expanded exponentially with the migration and passing through of people in big cities during and after World War II. World War II was the first time in United States military history that women were recruited into the armed forces, with the creation of the Women's Army Corps (WAC). Concurrently, as some women enlisted into the armed forces, others moved into different nontraditional jobs within the civilian workforce. As labor demands shifted during World War II, women began to have more independence. The independence that women found when entering industrial and other nontraditional occupations led to changes in clothing norms as well. The acceptance of women wearing pants to work allowed butch lesbians in particular to dress more freely in public without fear of standing out. Simultaneously, the absence of men due to military service created an environment where lesbians had more opportunities to be with other woman in public spaces.

The visibility of lesbians during World War II allowed them to frequent cafes, restaurants, movie theaters and bars without having a male escort. This led to an increase in lesbian bars and other lesbian social scenes. However, in the 1940s, the State Liquor Authority interpreted the presence of any homosexual as disorderly conduct. Lesbian bars were therefor required to strike a delicate balance between allowing their patrons to express themselves freely, while also restricting any behaviors that would bring in unwanted attention from the police. Very few raids happened in lesbian bars through the mid-1940s for this reason. Service clubs located near military bases also took on characteristics of the lesbian bars. These bars were often inhabited by groups of lesbians who embraced butch/femme identities.

In the 1960s, with the rise of the gay liberation movement and an increasing identification with the term and identity "lesbian," women's bars increased in popularity. The 1970s saw the rise of lesbian feminism, and bars became important community activist spaces. Some lesbian bars in the U.S. also supported women's softball teams.

== Policing and backlash ==
Homosexual acts were illegal in the United States until gradual decriminalization from 1962 to 2003, and police raids were a risk at places where lesbianism was considered criminal indecency, frequently facilitated by undercover and off-duty police officers. Through the 1960s, law enforcement required lesbians to have three pieces of women's clothing, otherwise facing arrests on the basis of presenting as men. Lesbians could be harassed and detained by the police for publicly gathering in a place where alcohol was being served, dancing with someone of the same gender, or failure to present identification. Some San Francisco bar owners banded together in the Tavern Guild to fight back against this, collecting funds to defend patrons who had been arrested in raids.

Additionally, in places like Minneapolis, heteronormative blue laws controlled women's autonomy in bars and required them to be accompanied by a man. Even after inside, women were not permitted to use the bar space like their male counterparts, such as having to refrain from the use of barstools. Under the radar, lesbians and gay men ran small scale operations (often out of residential spaces) to get around blue law legislation which required the closure of bars on Sundays.

Men were often the landlords of lesbian bars, in order to secure liquor licenses and navigate relationships with the police and the Mafia. Lesbian and gay clubs/bars faced weekly raids in New York, and in response constructed plans to warn each other. If women were arrested, they often went to the New York Women's House of Detention. Bar owners often bribed police to warn them just prior to raids, upon which they would turn on the lights in the bar and lesbians would separate.

As a form of protection, some bars covered their windows, did not have identifying signage, or could only be entered through a back door. Some bar owners tried membership-based models, which heightened security but was also exclusionary.

In Britain, club owners were not held to the same licensing standards as general drinking establishments, so unregulated alcohol was commonly distributed. Police raids were often conducted on these clubs in the 1940s, targeting not only the queer customers but the club owners as well.

== Decline ==
In addition to drinking, lesbian bar culture has also revolved around community building, dancing, live entertainment, and pool playing. This targeted but not lucrative patronage was not always profitable and caused many bars to shut their doors. A 1980s informal survey found that two-thirds of patrons at lesbian bars were not there to drink, correlating to an early decline. A slight 80s resurgence would be observed before a subsequent decline in the 1990s, due to increased social mobility of queer identities, and the dwindle of a perceived need for specifically lesbian environments.

These pieces of history are being lost as the "neighborhood lesbian bar" is increasingly unable to make rent payments, and as gentrification contributes to declining patronage. Additionally, the wage gap in the U.S. adds to economic disparity for female patronage, as gay male bars persist with more economic capital, and the rise of internet dating culture is displacing the cultivation of intergenerational lesbian communities historically created in lesbian bars. Because lesbian women are more likely to be primary caretakers of children than gay men, lesbian neighborhoods take on a different shape than gay neighborhoods, and as a result, lesbian night life decreases. Even in queer hubs and centers across the United States, such as San Francisco, the decline of lesbian spaces has been notably felt.

Along with the increased mainstreaming of LGBTQ culture, use of the term "queer" for self-identification, instead of "lesbian", has grown among many younger members of the lesbian community; and with the rise in internet dating culture, lesbian-specific bars became less common. By 2023 there were only around two dozen in the country, according to The New York Times. In the United States' largest city, New York City, only three remained.

Some documentaries about the decline include:

- The Death of Lesbian Bars (focus on Australia).
- Last Call at Maud's (1993) (focus on San Francisco, United States)
- The Last Lesbian Bars (2015) (focus on the United States).
- Lesbian Bar Project (2022) (focus on the United States).

== Evolution ==
Some lesbian bars have evolved into "queer" bars, welcoming not only lesbians but other members of the LGBTQ+ community. In 2021 Henrietta Hudson, which had opened in 1991 as a lesbian bar, evolved into "queer human bar built by lesbians." Mobile, Alabama, bar Herz opened in 2019 as a lesbian bar but by 2022 was welcoming customers with "a range of identities, including lesbian, bisexual, pansexual and more." Herz closed in 2023. In Paris, the lesbian bar Unity rebranded itself as a more inclusive "queer feminist" bar called La Mutinerie.

Some new bars have opened with this business model. In 2023, bars Ruby Fruit and Honey's at Star Love opened in Los Angeles, California; the new bars describe themselves as a "queer bar" that caters to a more diverse group than the typical lesbian bar, and gay bars. As You Are Bar opened with this model in Washington DC in 2022, describing themselves as "a lesbian-slash-queer bar." They said that framing themselves this way (as well as many of their business practices, such as a dedication to anti-racist practices and inclusion of activities and beverages that do not contain alcohol) was the result of long conversations with the Washington D.C. queer community. News outlets like Eater reported on both Ruby Fruit and Honey's as lesbian bars as did the Georgetown Voice for As You Are Bar and that the clientele and ownership of all bars mentioned in these sections appears to not have shifted too far astray from their original attendees or owners.

The repositioning into queer spaces is, according to the Washington Post, sometimes viewed negatively, "particularly [by] older women who identify as lesbian, [who] bristle at that expansion". According to Tagg Magazine, Henrietta Hudson's rebranding "proved to be controversial" on social media as to some it felt the bar was no longer lesbian-centered. However, this controversy did not appear to prevent patrons in 2021 from filling reservations for their new space that served charcuterie and cocktails. Henrietta Hudson's digital manager stated that, "It's not that we aren't lesbian-centric, we are built by lesbians. It's a more truthful renaming. We are a queer-centric bar, we are welcoming to the entire community. We want to acknowledge our history that we are built by lesbians and have been a lesbian bar, so we're centered in that way."

There continues to be an interest in creating unique spaces that center around women loving women. For example, popups in the 2020s like Dave's Lesbian Bar in Queens, New York have fundraised for "a queer-centric mutual aid hub by day, and lesbian bar by night." According to Autostraddle's Queer Girl City Guide, bookstores, cafes, and roving parties are also popular for lesbians and other queer women all around the world.

== List of lesbian bars ==
Lesbian bars have become rare in Western culture nations, and there are signs of decline in parts of Asia as well. However, there are some lesbian-friendly and gay-owned bars today that host "lesbian nights" or "queer women" nights. Some current and past lesbian bars include:

=== Asia ===
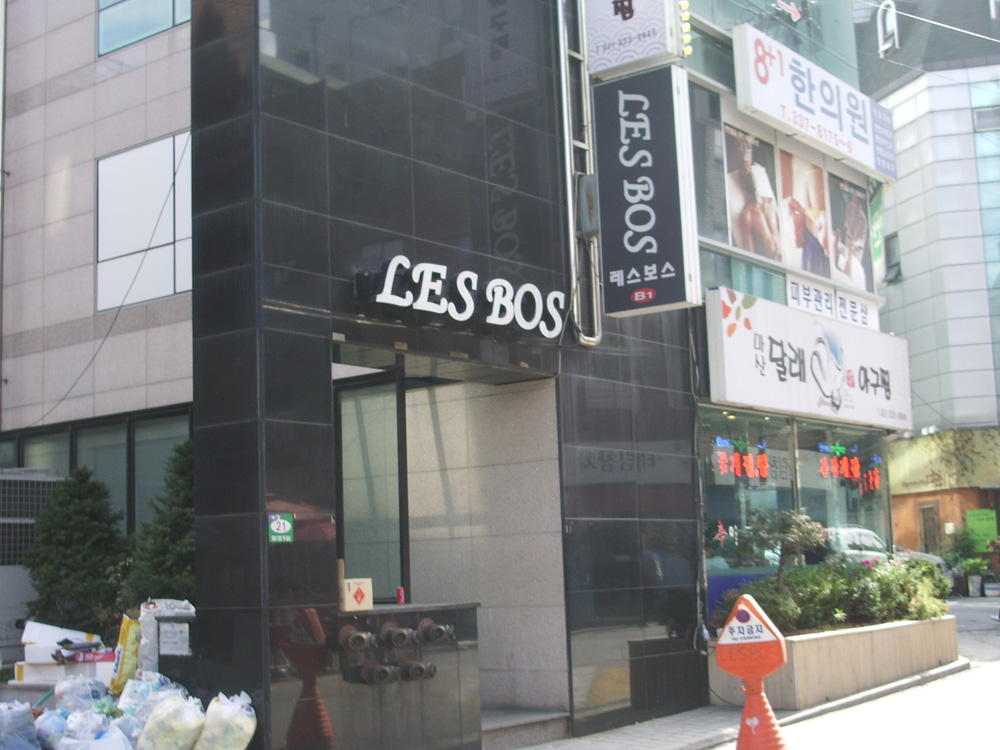
LES BOS (Korean: 레스보스) bar in Seoul.

Hong Kong (China)

- Virus and L'Paradis are two lesbian bars left in Hong Kong, down from nine in previous years.

Seoul (South Korea)

- LES BOS, located in the Sinchon area of Seoul, opened in 1996 and is the first lesbian bar in South Korea.

Shanghai (China)

- Roxie's, the first lesbian bar in Shanghai, opened in 2014.

Tokyo (Japan)

- Goldfinger started as a lesbian bar in the Shinjuku Ni-chōme neighborhood in the early 2000s and is now mixed, but allows only women on Saturdays.

=== Australia and New Zealand ===
Sydney (Australia)

Various nights occur regularly in Sydney catering to LGBTQ women.

- Unicorns, created by Delsi the Cat, is a semi-regular party, generally with a warehouse vibe. It also occurs at other locations, such as Melbourne.
- GiRLTHING, described as a 'femme-queer' party, is run by Snatch&Grab monthly, generally at the Imperial Hotel.
- Birdcage was launched in 2012 and generally occurs weekly. It describes itself as, 'Enmore's Queerest Shin-Dig'.

Melbourne (Australia)

- Sundaylicious, a monthly Sunday session event held at various different venues across Melbourne.
- Friyay, a bi-monthly event held on every second and fourth Friday of the month, at Francseca's Bar in Northcote, Melbourne.
- Mother, a regular club night held at Attik.

=== Canada ===
Montreal (Quebec)

- Baby Face Disco, established in 1968 by Denise Cassidy (aka Babyface), was the first lesbian-only bar in Montreal. It was followed by Chez Madame Arthur and Chez Jilly.
- Labyris, Lilith, and L'Exit were popular in the 1980s "Golden Age" of Montreal lesbian bars when a lesbian neighborhood in the Plateau Mont Royal flourished, with bookstores, community organizations and cafes.
- Tabou, Klytz, G-Spot and Magnolia were among a dozen bars for women that opened in the 1990s, though many of them were short-lived.

By 2019, there were no lesbian bars left in Montreal, though events for queer women continued to be held.

=== Europe ===
Amsterdam (Netherlands)

- Café Saarein, located on the picturesque Elandsgracht in the Jordaan neighborhood, was founded in 1978 after a collective of ten women took over the space, remaining "women-only" until 1999. It was then converted to an all-inclusive space by Dia Roozemond. The bar began to operate under the Saarein Foundation in 2025.

Barcelona (Spain)

- Daniel's, opened in late 1975, was one of the first lesbian bars in Spain and one of the first LGBT bars in Barcelona. Opened by María del Carmen Tobar, it originally was a bar and billiards room but expanded to have a dance hall. In the early years of the Spanish democratic transition, the police would occasionally raid the bar. Tobar played an active role in making Daniel's the center of lesbian life in Barcelona, sponsoring sports teams and a theater group. The bar later closed, but would be remembered in books and exhibits for its importance in the lesbian history of Spain.

Berlin (Germany)

- Violetta, owned by Lotte Hahm, was one of the largest of the many lesbian bars and dance halls that flourished during the Weimar Republic (1918-1930), when a guidebook was published for women that included 14 different lesbian establishments. This bar featured the "calling card ladies ball", "fashion shows for masculine women and transvestites", and lesbian singalongs of "The Lavender Song."

Copenhagen (Denmark)

- Vela Gay Club, all-girls bar in Vesterbro district.

Frankfurt (Germany)

- La Gata, the only lesbian bar in Frankfurt, opened in 1971. According to owner Erika "Ricky" Wild, it "is the world's oldest surviving lesbian bar."

London (England)

- Candy Bar in Soho, opened in 1996 and closed in 2014. Men were allowed if gay and accompanied by women.
- The Gateways Club in Chelsea was one of the longest-surviving lesbian bars in the world. It opened in 1943 and closed in 1985. The bar was the setting for a scene in the 1968 film The Killing of Sister George, with real clientele dancing alongside its lead actresses.

Paris (France)

- Le Monocle (1920s-World War II) was one of Paris' first and most famous lesbian bars; some of its clientele were photographed by George Brassai.
- Chez Moune, a lesbian cabaret opened by Monique Carton in Place Pigalle in 1936, has been described as the first lesbian cabaret with dancing in Europe. It converted to a mixed music club in the 21st century.
- New Moon, also in Place Pigalle, began in the late 1800s and had been a jazz club and Impressionist hangout as well as a lesbian cabaret before it converted to a mixed music club in the 21st century.
- Pulp was a popular Pulp Fiction movie style bar from 1997 to 2007.

Other Parisian lesbian bars include La Mutinerie, Le Bar'Ouf, Le 3W Kafé, Ici Bar de Filles, and So What.

=== Mexico, Central, and South America ===
Mexico City (Mexico)

- Babiana Club Less is a lesbian nightclub that opened in the Zona Rosa neighborhood in 2013.

Buenos Aires (Argentina)

- Bach Bar, the oldest gay bar in Buenos Aires, started as a lesbian bar and still draws a lesbian crowd.

=== Middle East ===
Beirut (Lebanon)

- Coup d'Etat, opened in 2006 during a ceasefire in Lebanon, claimed to be the Middle East's first openly lesbian bar. It did not attract enough business from either local gay women or tourists, and closed in 2007. By 2018, it had opened again.

Istanbul (Turkey)

- Bigudi was the first lesbian bar to open in Istanbul, and now attracts gay men as well.

Tel Aviv (Israel)

- Amazona, located at Lilienblum St 23, was the only lesbian bar operating in Tel Aviv. It closed in 2020.

=== South Africa ===
- Beaulah in Cape Town was originally a lesbian bar until it became mixed.

=== United States ===
As reported by PBS News Hour, there were more than 200 lesbian bars across the United States in the late 1980s. By 2021, the total had dropped to 21 bars due to the COVID-19 pandemic, the availability of dating apps, gentrification, and assimilation of queer people. According to the Lesbian Bar Project, the number of bars had increased to 36 across the United States as of 2025.

==== Northeast ====
Asbury Park, New Jersey

- The Bond Street Bar operated in the 1970s and 1980s.
- Chez-Elle (also known as the Chez-L Lounge) was founded in 1965 at 429 Cookman Avenue by former nun Margaret Hogan. The bar "was part of a landmark court case in the 1960s...."
- The Key West Hotel was a lesbian resort with four bars, a restaurant, and pool. It opened in 1981 and closed in 1990.
- The Owl and Pussycat, established in 1979 at 162 Main Street, was relocated to the Key West Hotel.

In the late 1930s, 208 Bond Street was the location of a women's bar. In the 1970s, the third floor of the M&K nightclub, a gay disco on Cookman Avenue, was for lesbians.

Boston, Massachusetts

- Dani's Queer Bar, established in 2024 on Boylston Street in Boston's Back Bay, serves lesbians, non-binary, and queer-identifying women.

Greenfield, Massachusetts

- Last Ditch Bar opened in 2025. Non-lesbians are welcome but "house rules" require that they "respect that the space was built with lesbian community at the center of its mission." Other rules prohibit various forms of discrimination, and the wearing of filtration face masks is strictly enforced. In August 2026, an Instagram post announcing mask-optional shows on Saturdays sparked online controversy.

New York City, New York

New York city comprises five boroughs: The Bronx, Brooklyn, Manhattan, Queens, and Staten Island.

- Bum Bum Bar in Queens opened in the early 1990s and closed in 2018.
- Cubbyhole in Manhattan opened in 1994 and is a predominantly lesbian bar.
- Eve's Hangout, also known as Eve Adams's Tearoom, was one of the first lesbian restaurant/bars in the United States. It was opened in 1925 by Eva Kotchever and located at 129 MacDougal Street in Greenwich Village. The venue displayed a sign greeting visitors that read: "Men are admitted but not welcome." Eve's Hangout closed in 1926 after Kotchever was arrested and deported for obscenity. Following her deportation she was sent to the concentration camp at Auschwitz where she was killed in 1943.
- Ginger's Bar (aka "The G-Spot") in Brooklyn opened in 2000.
- Henrietta Hudson in Manhattan opened in 1991 and was formerly the longest-running lesbian bar in the New York City area. In 2021 it was rebranded as a "queer human space built by Lesbians [sic]."
- Page 3, at Charles Street and Seventh Avenue in Greenwich Village, was lesbian-run and open from the mid-1950s until mid-1960s.
- Initially opening in 1950 as a restaurant, the Sea Colony became a lesbian bar in the 1960s. It closed sometime thereafter but was a favorite space of writer and activist Joan Nestle.

Philadelphia, Pennsylvania

- Sisters was a lesbian bar that closed after 17 years of operation in 2013.
- Toasted Walnut Bar & Kitchen opened its doors in 2015 and closed in 2021. The bar was opened to cater to those who felt a void after the loss of Sisters bar. Although Toasted Walnut focused primarily on gay women, the establishment was not explicitly a lesbian bar.

Washington, D.C.

- A League of Her Own (ALOHA) is located on the ground floor of Pitcher's, a gay sports bars. ALOHA describes themselves as both a lesbian and queer bar.
- As You Are lesbian cafe and bar, located in the Capitol Hill neighborhood, opened in 2022.
- Phase 1 was the oldest (45 years) continually operating lesbian bar in the United States until its closure in February 2016.
- XX+ opened in 2018, but closed due to the COVID-19 pandemic.

Worcester, Massachusetts

- Femme Bar, at 62 Green Street in the Canal District neighborhood, opened in March 2023. The lesbian-identifying bar and restaurant serves all members of the LGBTQ community.

==== Midwest ====
Chicago, Illinois

- Dorothy, located in the Ukrainian Village neighborhood, opened in February 2020 but was forced to close temporarily for two years due to COVID restrictions, and reopened in July 2022. It describes itself as "a neighborhood lesbian cocktail lounge for every friend of Dorothy".
- Nobody's Darling, located in the Andersonville neighborhood, opened in 2021 in the space previously occupied by lesbian bar Joie De Vine (which closed during the COVID-19 pandemic). It was a 2022 James Beard Foundation Award finalist for Outstanding Bar Program.

Columbus, Ohio

- Blazer's Pub, founded by Karen Blazer in 1994. One of the first lesbian owned establishments in the long part of the Short North. Known for performances by The Dyke Queens (lesbian variety show), H.I.S. Kings (drag king troupe) Ladies of Desire (lesbian strippers) and other local talent. Closed in September 2011.
- Jack's A Go-Go/Logan's Off Broadway/Summit Station, founded in 1971 and known colloquially as Jack's. Jack's was Ohio's longest running lesbian owned and operated bar. Located near the campus of The Ohio State University, the bar morphed from a neighborhood go-go bar into a women's bar in the early 1970's. Initially owned by Don and Cleta Logan, the bar became known as a lesbian bar when Peter Brown as hired to bartend. Peter was a classically trained musician and young lesbian when she started bartending on Sunday nights to support her music career. Word got out that a lesbian was behind the bar and soon flocks of lesbians gravitated to the bar. Peter took ownership in 1980 and operated the bar until its closure in 2008.
- Slammers, founded in 1993, is the only remaining lesbian bar in Ohio.

Milwaukee, Wisconsin

- Walker's Pint, which opened in 2001, is the only surviving lesbian bar in Milwaukee.

==== South ====
Atlanta, Georgia

- My Sister's Room, founded in 1996, is the longest running lesbian-centric establishment in the Southeast.
- Phase One was founded in the 2010s. The now-closed bar catered primarily to African-American lesbians.

Dallas, Texas

- Sue Ellen's, founded in 1989, is the second longest running lesbian bar in the nation.

Durham, North Carolina

- Arcana Bar and Lounge, founded in 2015, is the state's only known lesbian bar.

Houston, Texas

- Chances Bar operated as a predominantly lesbian bar for 16 years until closure in November 2010.
- The Pearl Bar became the city's only lesbian bar in 2013.

Richmond, Virginia

- Babe's of Carytown opened in 1979 and is one of the oldest lesbian bars in the country.

==== West ====
Los Angeles, California

- Honey's at Star Love, a live music venue and bar founded by Mo Faulk, Kate Greenberg, and Charlotte Gordon, opened in East Hollywood in February 2023.
- The Ruby Fruit, a wine bar and restaurant founded by Mara Herbkersman and Emily Bielagus, opened in the Silver Lake neighborhood in February 2023. Its self-description states that it also caters to "non-binary, gender-nonconforming and trans people".

Portland, Oregon

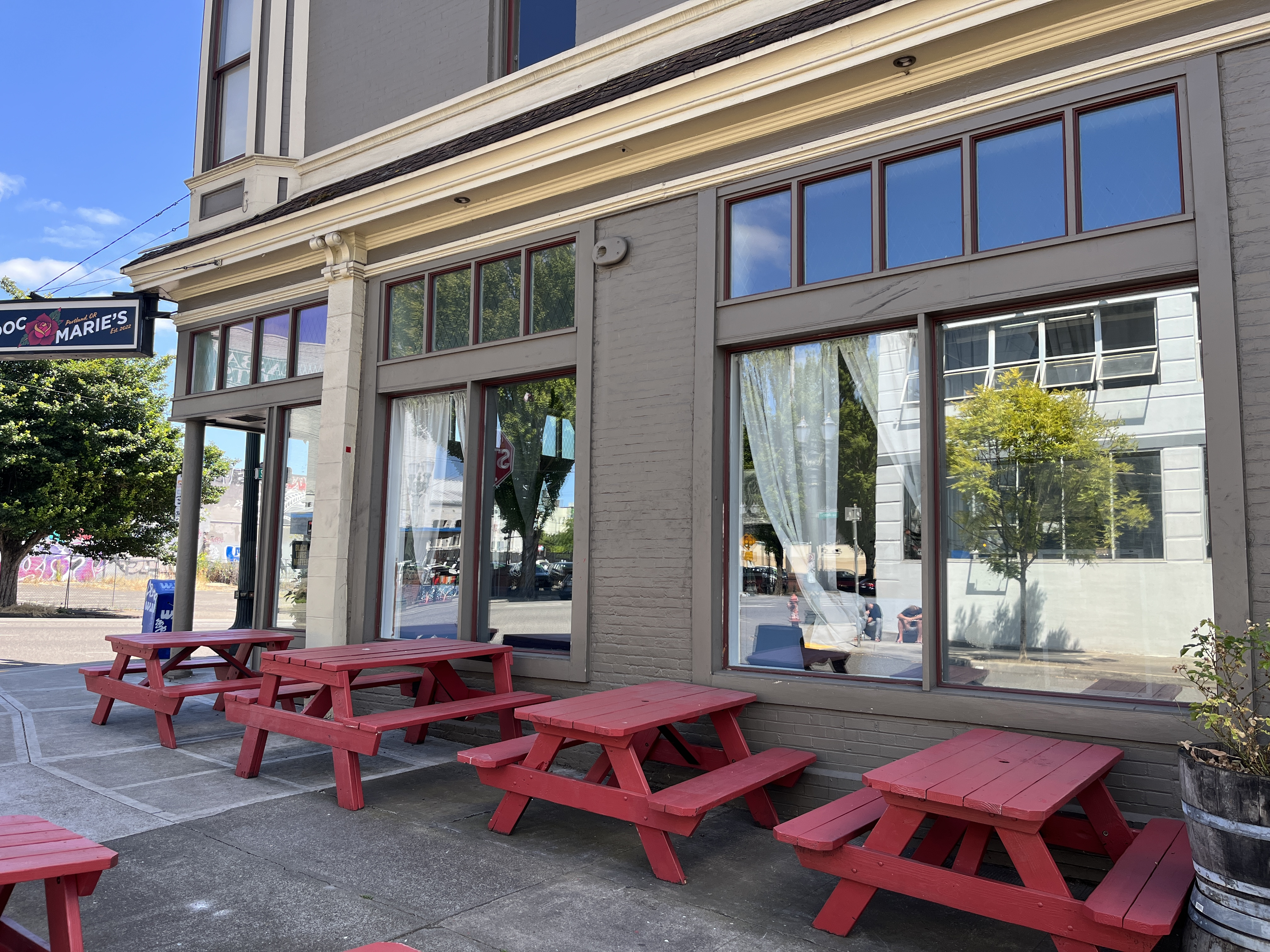
Doc Marie's (2022)

- Doc Marie's, Portland.

San Francisco and the San Francisco Bay Area, California

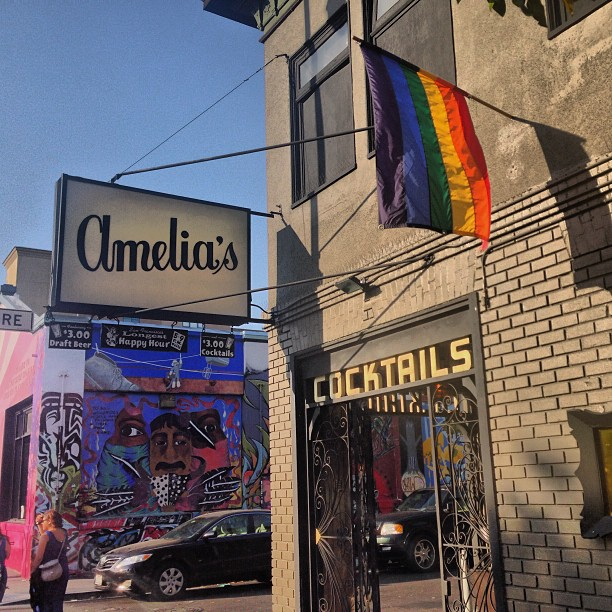
Amelia's (1978–1991), San Francisco

- A Little More was a 1980s lesbian dance club.
- Amelia's, at 647 Valencia Street in the Mission district, was owned by Rikki Streicher. It opened in 1978 and closed in 1991.
- Clementina's Baybrick Inn (a.k.a. "The Brick"), at 1190 Folsom Street in SoMa, was a hostel, dance club, and nightclub for lesbians. It opened in 1982 and closed in 1987.
- Jolene's, located on the corner of 16th and Harrison Street, is lesbian-owned bar founded by Jolene Linsangan and Shannon Amitin, which opened its doors in December 2018.
- The Lexington Club (locally known as "The Lex"), at 3464 19th Street in the Mission district, opened in 1997 and closed in 2015. It was the last lesbian bar in the city at the time of its closing.
- Maud's, at 937 Cole Street in the Haight-Ashbury district, also owned by Rikki Streicher, opened in 1966 and closed in 1989.
- Mona's 440 Club (original name Mona's Club), at 440 Broadway in the North Beach area, was the first lesbian bar in San Francisco. Owned by Mona Sargent, it opened in 1936 and ran for 26 years.
- Peg's Place, at 4737 Geary Boulevard in the Richmond district, opened in the 1950s and closed in 1988. In March 1979, it was the site of a lesbophobic attack by off-duty members of the S.F.P.D.
- Rikki's, located at 2223 Market Street in the Castro District, opened in June 2025. The lesbian-owned establishment is the city's first women's sports bar. Rikki's is named after San Francisco's pioneer lesbian bar owner, and gay and lesbian rights activist, Rikki Streicher.
- Scott's Pit, at 10 Sanchez Street in the Duboce Triangle neighborhood, was owned by Charlene Scott and was the first lesbian biker bar in the city. It was open from 1970 until 1984.
- Wild Side West, at 424 Cortland Avenue in Bernal Heights, defines itself as "a blend of lesbians, locals, eclectic art and neighborhood sports bar." It opened in 1962.

Many lesbian bars in the 1940s and 1950s were in North Beach and included Tommy's Place/12 Adler Place, Anxious Asp, Artist's Club, Beaded Bag, The Beige Room, Blanco's, Chi-Chi Club, Copper Lantern, Front, Miss Smith's Tea Room, Tin Angel, Tommy 299, Our Club, and Paper Doll. The police raid of Kelly's Alamo Club in 1956 and the arrest of 36 women on charges of "frequenting a house of ill repute" led the Daughters of Bilitis to publish a guide, "What To Do In Case of Arrest."

In the East Bay, Mary's First and Last Chance Bar, in Oakland, was closed in 1958 for "catering to lesbians", but the bar challenged the ruling and won. In the 1970s and 1980s, other lesbian bars in the East Bay included Jubilee, Driftwood, Bachanal, and Ollie's.

Seattle, Washington

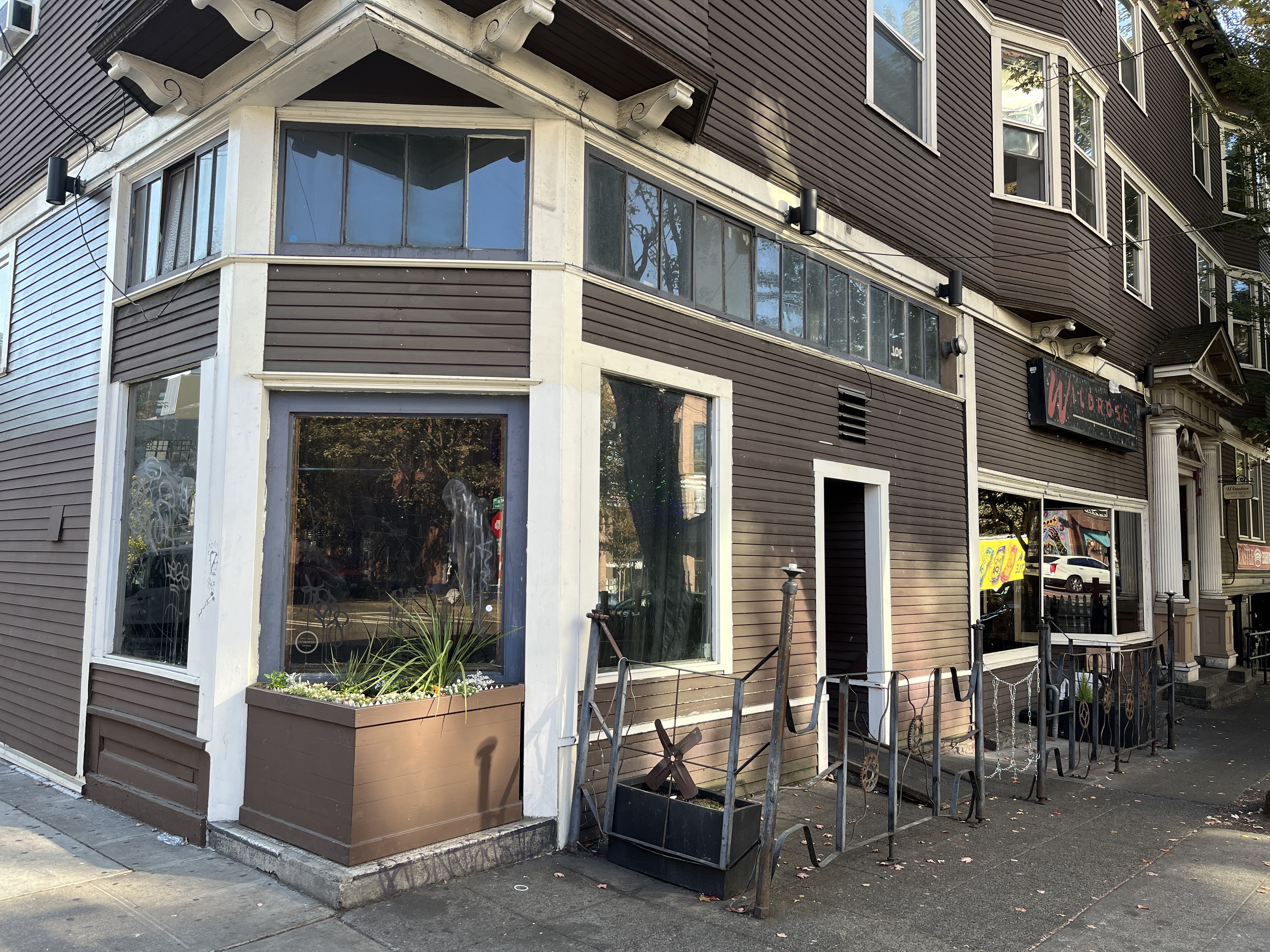
The Wildrose, Seattle

- The Grand Union, entered through an unmarked door under an overpass, and Sappho's Tavern were lesbian bars of the 1950s.
- The Silver Slipper was a popular lesbian bar of the 1970s, when women's spaces proliferated. In an oral history, a former customer spoke of the importance of being personally introduced and wearing the unofficial "jeans and flannel shirt" dress code inside the bar.
- The Wildrose was started in the early 1980s by a lesbian collective, and is the longest running lesbian bar on the West Coast.

West Hollywood, California

- The Palms was founded in the 1960s, when the area now known as the City of West Hollywood was a Los Angeles neighborhood. It closed in 2013.

== See also ==
- Last Call at Maud's (1993 documentary about the last evening at a San Francisco lesbian bar)
- Lesbian Bar Project
