= Legacy of War Foundation =

Legacy of War Foundation (LoWF) is a non-governmental organisation helping communities to rebuild from armed conflict.

It began as a photographic and advocacy project from photographer Giles Duley documenting the impact of war on civilians, and in 2017 registered as a charity in England & Wales in 2017 to provide support to families displaced by the Syrian civil war. The organisation now operates projects and funds local partners in Ukraine, Rwanda, Lebanon and the Democratic Republic of the Congo, and uses art and storytelling as a tool for advocacy. Since 2023, LoWF has offered mentoring and commissions to the winner of the Ian Parry Grant. In 2025, award-winning investigative journalist Iain Overton joined LoWF's board of trustees. LoWF is a member of the WHO's World Rehabilitation Alliance.

== Projects ==
=== Lebanon ===
In 2017, Duley partnered with Random Acts to raise over $200,000 for Syrian families who had fled to Lebanon, including some who had appeared in Duley's 2014 film for Channel 4, Unreported World: Syria's Invisible Refugees. This led to the establishment of Legacy of War Foundation to run the project which provided up to 8 years of support for families with particularly complex needs resulting from disability and trauma allowing their children to complete secondary school. During the Gaza war the Foundation expanded the project to support Palestinian and Lebanese children with life-changing injuries through treatment and rehabilitation in Lebanon. Duley's portrait of one of these children, Ivanna, with her mother Fatima won People's Pick in the 2025 Taylor Wessing Prize.

=== Rwanda ===
In 2018 LoWF CEO Giles Duley met genocide survivor Olive Musetsamfura while documenting the work of Humanity & Inclusion in Rwanda. Her experiences leading a cooperative of former sex workers and survivors of the Rwandan genocide undertaking subsistence farming would inspire the organisation's flagship program Land for Women, which combines land transfer with a business and climate-smart farming education model for women's cooperatives. In 2025 the project was awarded a United Nations Convention to Combat Desertification G20 Global Land Initiative grant for its innovative approach and impact on poverty alleviation. The program now includes five farms in Rwanda, and in 2025 began piloting green power to turn the farms into community hubs. (Reveal - Solar Power.)

=== Ukraine ===
Since the full-scale invasion of Ukraine, LoWF has worked with local partners across a range of activities to support marginalised groups affected by the conflict, including collaborating with activist Olena Shevchenko's organisation Insight to provide run shelters and provide specialist aid for women and LGBTQI+ people; training amputees as prosthetics technicians; and providing equipment to facilitate primary healthcare, telemedicine and diagnostics in areas near the frontlines.

LoWF has drawn attention to limited funding received by Ukrainian civil society organisations since in the early stages of the full-scale invasion, and campaigned for better resourcing for Ukrainian disability-led organisations leading aid efforts. Angelina Jolie has highlighted these efforts, and in 2025 visited Kherson city in Ukraine with Legacy of War Foundation.

In 2022, comedians John Thomson and Justin Moorhouse partnered with Factory Records'Alan Erasmus to announce a fundraising show at the Manchester Apollo, which raised over £20,000 for LoWF's work including providing ambulances, wheelchairs and specialist aid. Later that year, the street artist Banksy launched a limited run of unique screenprints in 2022 to raise funds for their work in Ukraine after visiting the country with LoWF's assistance to install a series of murals. In a statement he explained, "in Ukraine I saw a Legacy of War team sweep in and provide medical aid, attention, heaters, fresh water and a friendly face to some very desperate people in a bombed out building. They also lent me one of their ambulances to work from, which turned out to be extremely useful when an angry babushka found me painting on her building and called the Police".

In 2023, LoWF partnered with President of Ukraine Volodymyr Zelenskyy's fundraising initiative United24 to fund the reconstruction of residential buildings in Kyiv oblast with a single released by Robert Del Naja of the band Massive Attack, and Sviatoslav Vakarchuk of Ocean Elzy.

The organisation has also undertaken advocacy, particularly for the rights of people with disabilities affected by the conflict and in the context of demining, including exhibitions and media campaigning in partnership with the United Nations Development Programme and actor Misha Collins. CEO and founder Giles Duley has also highlighted the anticipated long-term impacts of the war in sessions at UNHQ, the Ukraine Mine Recovery conference, the Ukraine Recovery Conference and online.

As of 2026, LoWF is continuing to deliver grants and equipment to its Ukrainian partners with a fleet of nine vehicles supporting evacuation and medical programming across southern and eastern regions of the country.
