= European Lesbian* Conference =

International lesbian-centric seminar

- Abbreviation: EL*C
- Formation: 2 February 2017; 9 years ago
- Type: NGO
- Purpose: Lesbian rights
- Headquarters: Vienna, Austria
- Location: Vienna
- Region served: Europe
- Official language: English
- Co presidents: Joëlle Sambi Nzeba and Eva Perez Nanclares
- Website: European Lesbian* Conference

The European Lesbian* Conference (EL*C) is an international lesbian-focused seminar and one of the largest to take place. The first event was held in October 2017 at the Brotfabrik in Vienna, Austria.

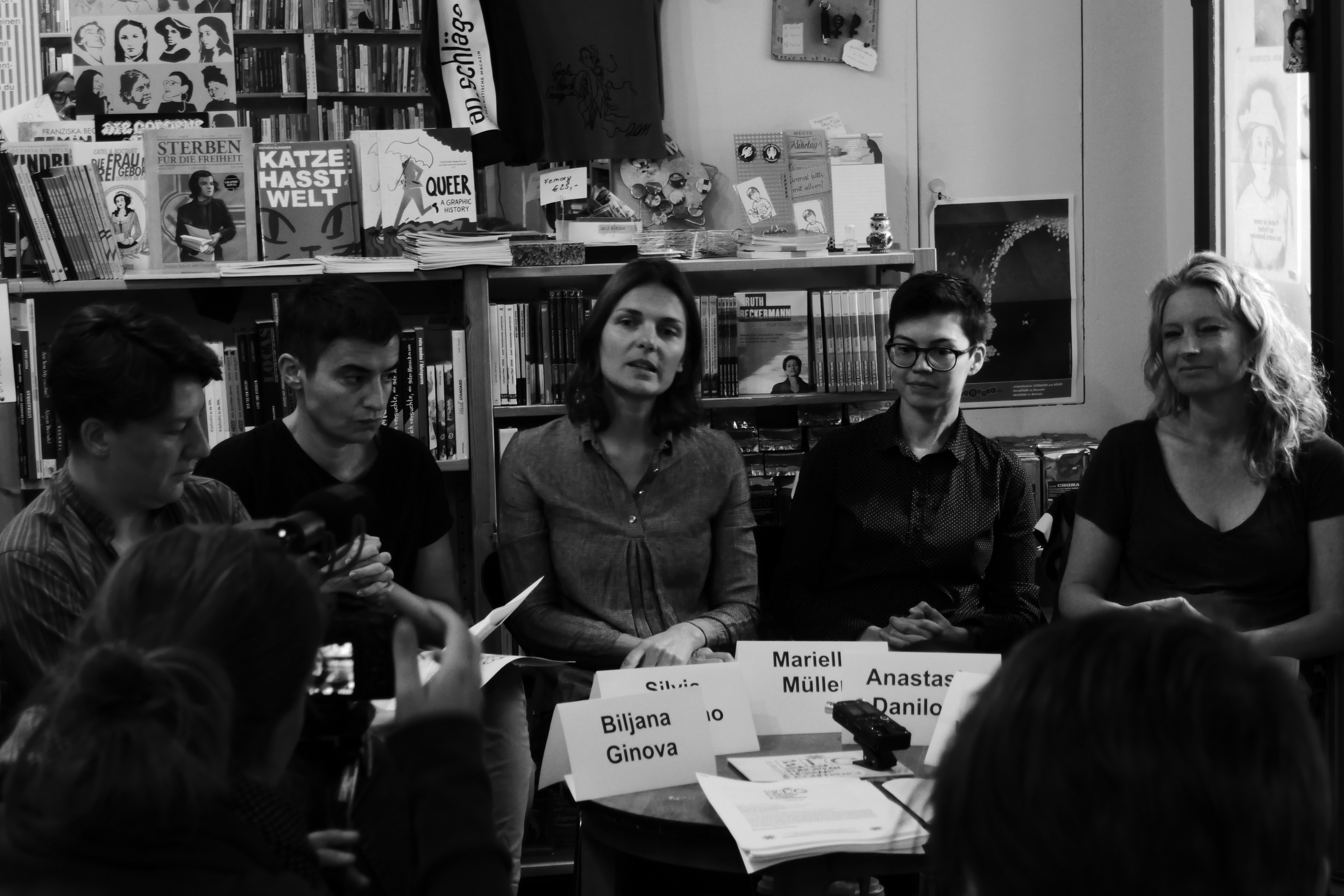
EL*C Press Conference in chicklit, feminist bookstore

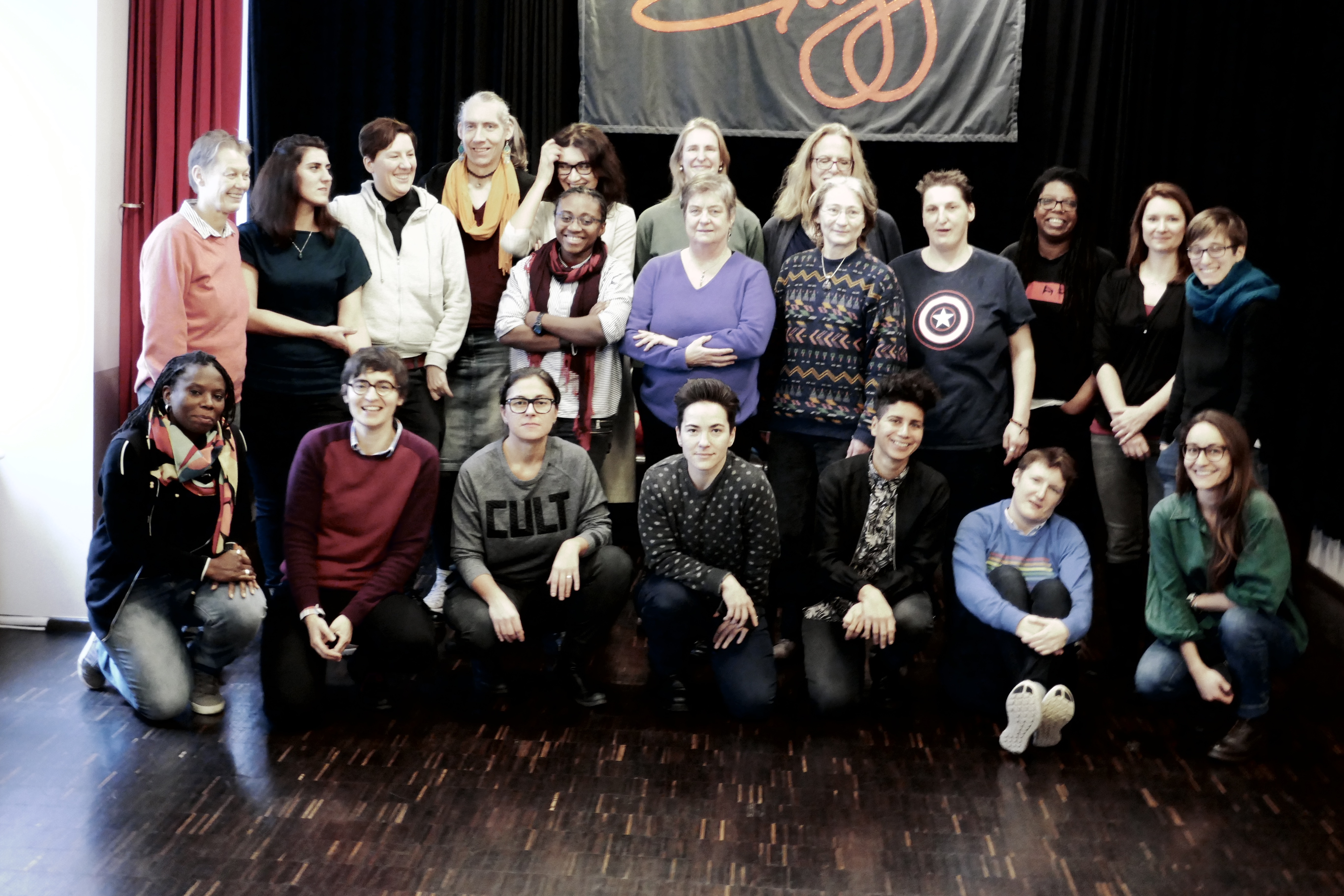
Some board members of the European Lesbian Conference (EL*C) during a meeting in Vienna in January 2018

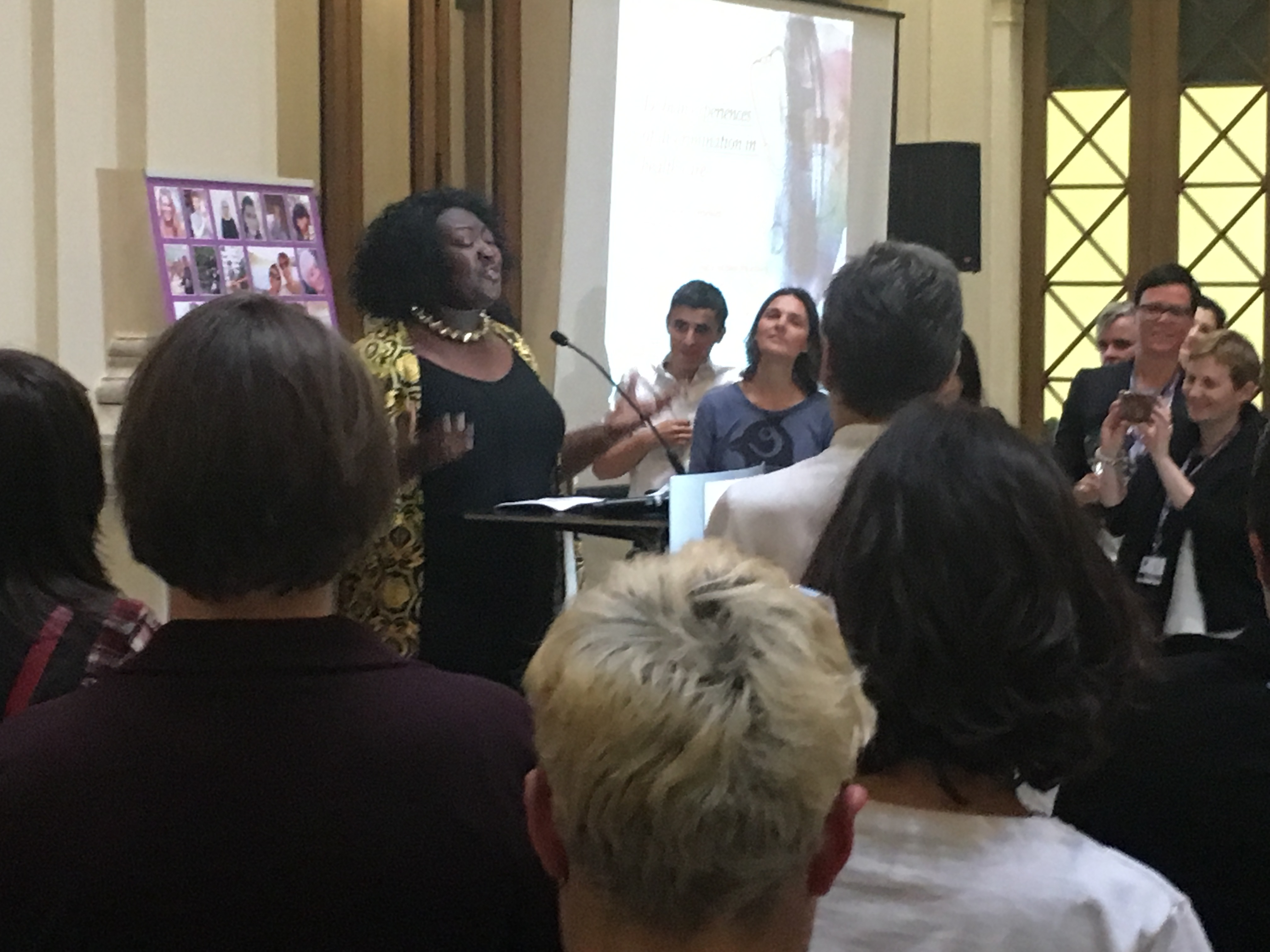
Phyll Opoku-Gyimah at the first European lesbian conference in Vienna October 2017

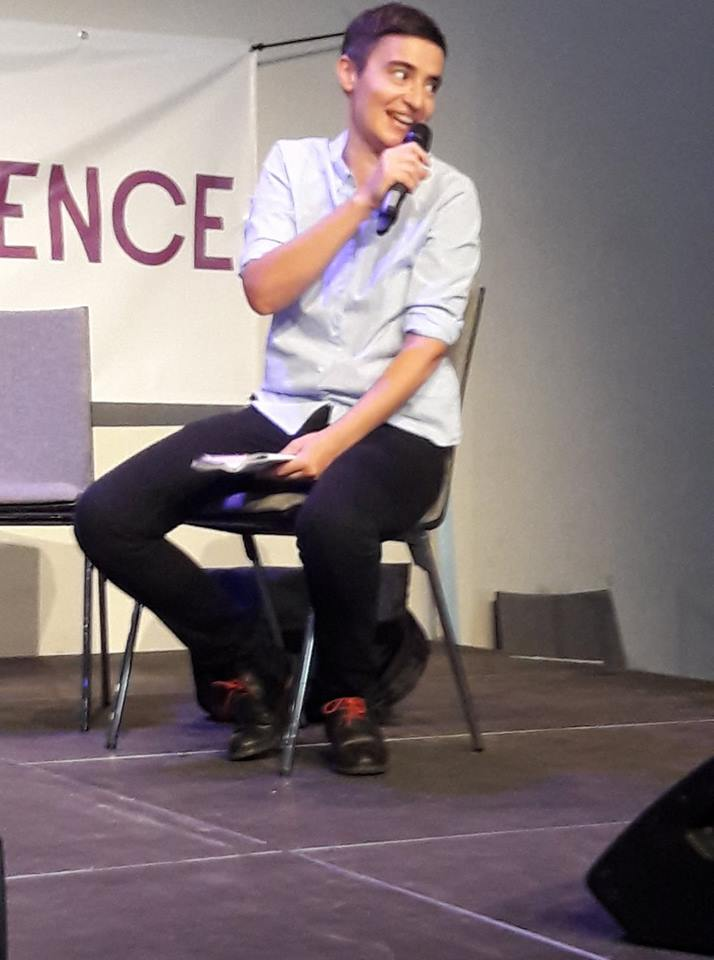
Silvia Casalino at the European Lesbian* Conference

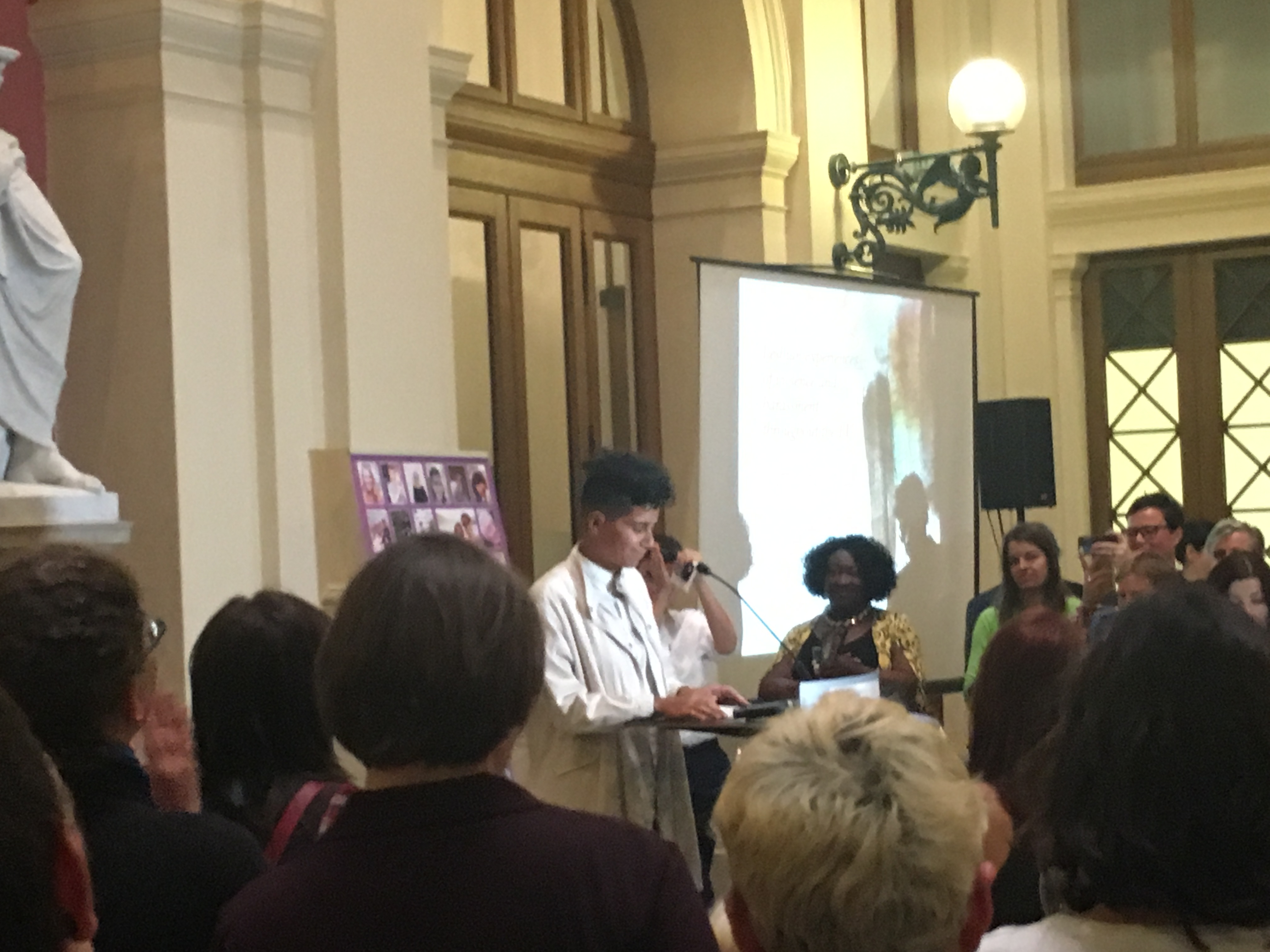
Faika El-Nagashi at the European Lesbian Confenrence in Vienne October 2017

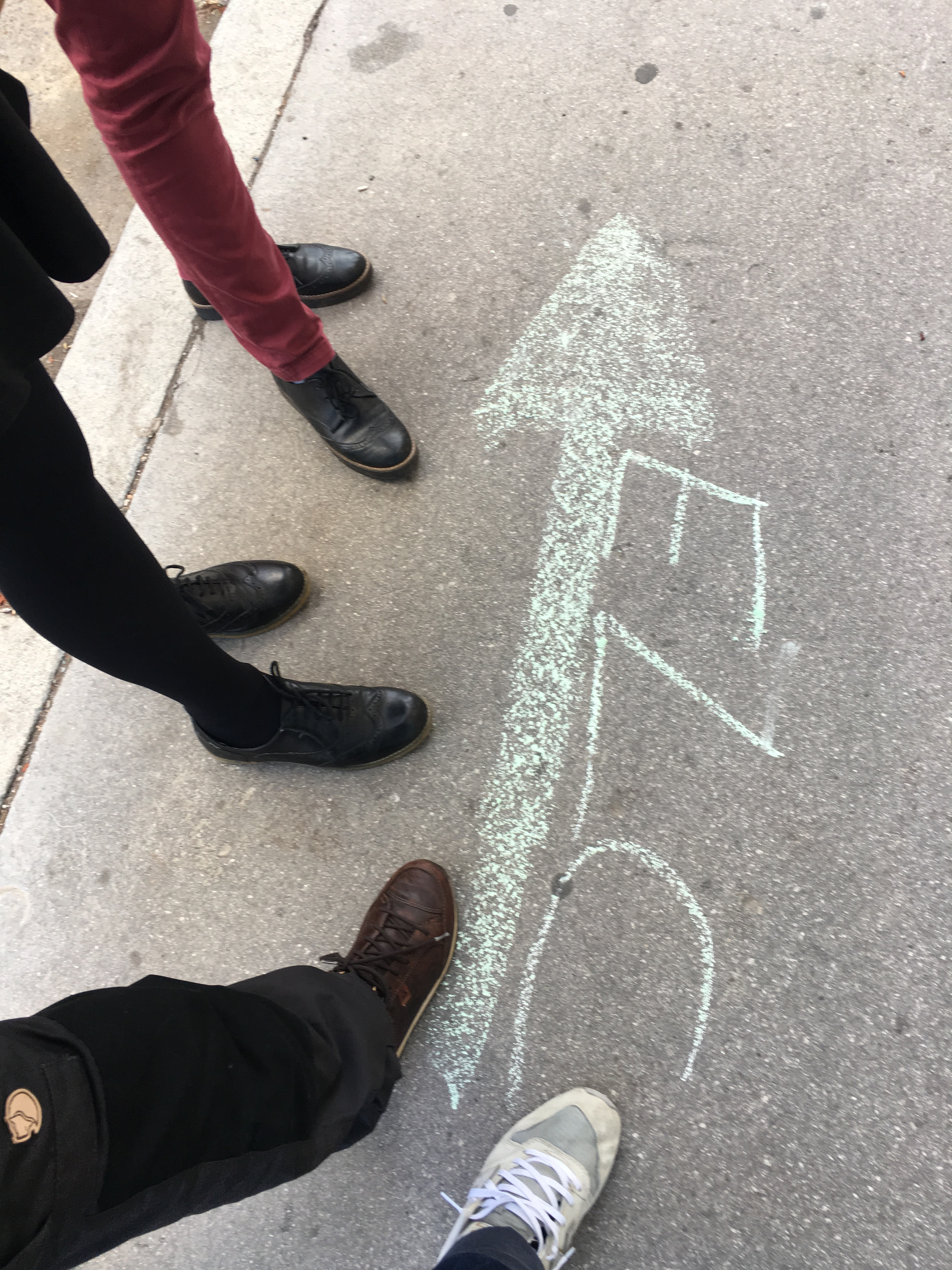
European Lesbian Conference Vienna 5–8 October 2017 01

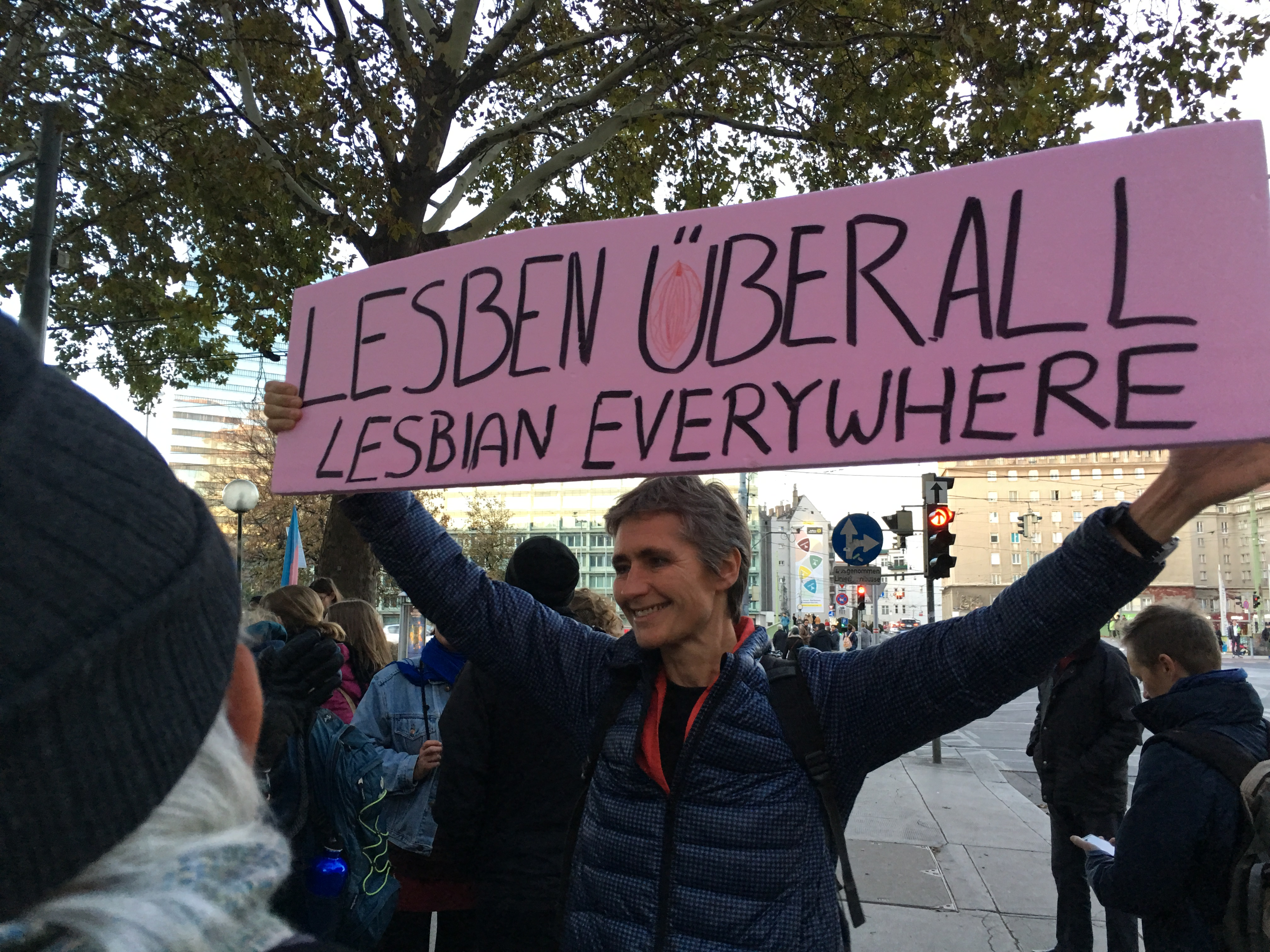
European lesbian conference in Vienna October 2017 15

== History ==
The first international lesbian conference was organized by the International Lesbian Information Service (ILIS) within ILGA in 1980 in Barcelona. In 1998 ILIS stopped its activity altogether, issuing a final newsletter. Shelley Anderson wrote a 58-page report named "Lesbian rights are human rights" to stress one of the main focuses of ILIS.

In 2016 during the annual ILGA European Conference in Cyprus, 70 European lesbians activists organized and participated in a workshop. The workshop participants concluded there was an urgent need to empower and increase the visibility of lesbian issues, to develop networks and to work on lesbian needs and oppressions.

Consequently, in 2017 the first European lesbian conference was organized independently from ILGA. Silvia Casalino, Anastasia Danilova, Mariella Müller, Alice Coffin, Olena Shevchenko and Maria von Känel were among the co-founders. On 2 February 2017, Ewa Dziedzic, Mariella Muller and Michaela Tulipan officially registered the NGO located in Vienna and chaired by Silvia Casalino and Mariella Müller.

Karima Zahi represented the EL*C during the Lesbian Visibility Day at the European Parliament on 26 April 2018. On this occasion they spoke about lesbophobia in the European countries, lesbian activism in the Balkans and Turkey, visibility of lesbians in education and the problems encountered by lesbian asylum seekers. Kika Fumero and Martha Fernándes Herráiz from Spain were also representatives from the NGO Lesworking.

=== 2017 conference in Vienna ===
Over 400 women from 44 European, Latin America and central Asian countries were invited to the conference according to Maria von Känel. Although Belgrade was considered as a possible location of the conference at first, Vienna was chosen for logistic reasons and the fact that there is an active and visible lesbian community in Vienna.

The main goal of the conference was to make lesbians visible, combat lesbophobia and to promote solidarity networks. Alice Coffin stressed the fact that when a cause is not visible, it does not exist. For lesbians, this is demonstrated by an analysis of the budget allotted to lesbian issues. According to Coffin, out of 424 million dollars allocated to LGBT projects, only 2% are distributed for lesbians. Furthermore, participating in ILGA conferences remains expensive. The EL*C has enabled 100 persons to participate free of cost and has kept a very low registration fee, to ensure the diversity among the participants and to respond to this criticism addressed to ILGA since the 1980s.

The first opening statement was made by Ulrike Lunacek, then a candidate of the Austrian Green Party in the legislative elections in Vienna. In her opening speech, the Austrian Green politician, who is also an outed lesbian, stressed that if the work on visibility was crucial, some progress also had to be made legally to ensure equal rights for lesbians. Other following opening statements were made by Faika El-Nagashi, Ewa Dziedzic and Phyll Opoku-Gyimah and Linda Riley, the publisher of Diva magazine, who gave a keynote introduction to the conference.

Two African women, among whom Chukwuike Obioma was not able to make it to the conference because they were denied a visa for Austria.

The European Lesbian* Conference was held from 5 October to 8 October 2017. A demonstration was held in the streets of Vienna on 7 October, the day before the closing of the conference. The general motto of the first EL*C gathering was "CONNECT, REFLECT, ACT, TRANSFORM".

==== Main themes of the conference ====
Main themes were announced by Alice Coffin among others in September 2017:

- Lesbian activism
- Lesbian research
- Lesbian politics
- Lesbian networking and organization

Elizabeth Holzleithner, professor of legal philosophy and gender studies, gave an opening conference on legal aspects entitled "Legally lesbian". She talked about the legal history of the criminalisation of same sex sexual acts between women.

A special place was given to talks concerning the history of the lesbian movement in Europe. Evien Tjabbes evoked the emergence of ILIS in the 1980s, as a wish to start evoking lesbian issues separately from ILGA, because it was felt that problems lesbians faced were different, although there are overlaps with LGBTIQ issues.

Alice Coffin, Hengameh Yaghoobifarah, and Linda Riley talked about the place that lesbians are given in the media.

=== 2019 conference ===
In 2018, a press release announced that the 2019 EL*C conference would take place in Kyiv, Ukraine, from 12 to 14 April.

== Organisation ==
Mariella Müller and Silvia Casalino were elected chairs at the founding of the EL*C in 2017. Other 2017 board members included Biljana Ginova (secretary), Maria von Känel (secretary), Luise Luksch (treasurer) and Leila Lohman, Michaela Tulipan, Ewa Dziedzic, Olena Shevchenko, Aurora Baba, Alice Coffin, Ilaria Todde, Anastasia Danilova, and Pia Stevenson. Dragana Todoriv joined the board after the conference in Vienna.

== See also ==
- LGBT rights in Europe
