= Giles Duley =

Documentary photographer

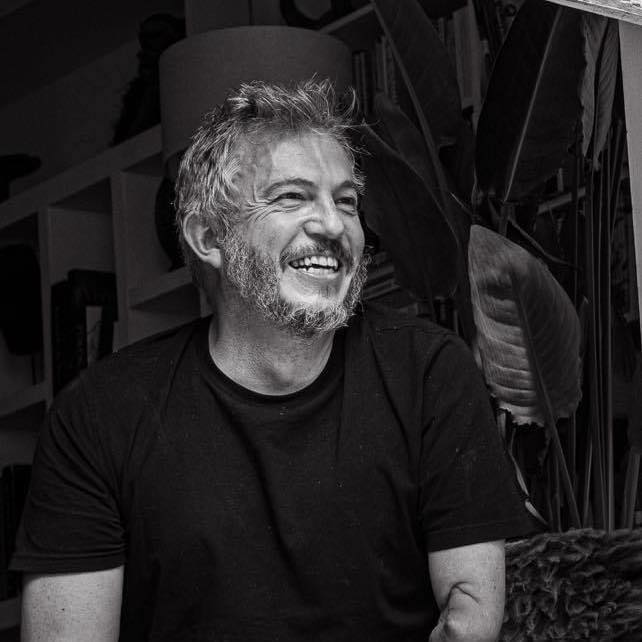
Duley at home, 2020

Giles Duley MBE (born 15 September 1971 in Wimbledon, London) is an English portrait and documentary photographer, chef, writer, CEO and presenter. Duley also cooks, and writes about food and food politics, under the moniker The One Armed Chef. He is best known for his work documenting the long term impact of war. He is the founder and CEO of the NGO Legacy of War Foundation.

== Biography ==
=== The rock & roll years ===
Duley started his career as a music photographer after studying at Arts University Bournemouth (though he only completed the first year). During the 1990s he worked for publications such as Select, Q, Esquire, GQ and Arena, particularly photographing the Britpop movement. He worked with Oasis, the Prodigy, the Charlatans, Underworld and Pulp. He also photographed numerous international artists including Mariah Carey, Lenny Kravitz and the Black Crowes.

In 2000 Q Magazine voted his work amongst the greatest rock photos of all time.

=== Documentary photography and photojournalism ===
In 2000 Duley gave up music photography to pursue his passion for documentary photography on a full-time basis. Concentrating on lesser known humanitarian issues and the consequences of conflict on civilians, he worked with many respected organizations including MAG, UNHCR, Emergency and Médecins Sans Frontières in countries including South Sudan, Nigeria, Congo, Kenya, Angola, Bangladesh and Ukraine. A selection of this work was published in his first book One Second of Light in 2016.

In 2007 Duley completed the Marathon des Sables.

In 2012 the TED team selected his talk as one of their favourites.

In 2015 he was commissioned by UNHCR to document the refugee crisis across the middle east and Europe. This year-long project produced the exhibition and book I Can Only Tell You What My Eyes See, and was incorporated into Massive Attack’s 2016 tour.

In 2019 he photographed the photographer Don McCullin for The Observer.

During the COVID-19 pandemic, Duley documented the work of three Imperial College Healthcare NHS Trust hospitals in London. Images from his final trip to Afghanistan shortly before the fall of Kabul were published by GQ in 2021.

Since 2015 Duley has been documenting the ongoing war in Ukraine. This work, including an ongoing photo diary project and a 2023 collaboration with the United Nations Development program, has been exhibited internationally. The Things They Carried, a collection of still life images of unexploded bombs (including from Ukraine), was shown at Atelier Jolie in New York in 2024. In the same year HUNGER Magazine published a series of Duley’s images from a 2023 visit to meet Sudanese refugees in Chad with Humanity & Inclusion. In 2025, his portrait of an injured Lebanese girl with her mother was exhibited at the National Portrait Gallery for the Taylor Wessing Photographic Portrait Prize. In early 2026 it was announced that the portrait had won the People's Pick vote.

Duley has collaborated on visual and mixed-media projects with artists and musicians including Massive Attack, Lisa Hannigan and PJ Harvey.

=== Afghanistan and injury ===
In 2011, whilst on foot patrol with the US 75th Cavalry Regiment in Afghanistan, Duley stepped on an improvised explosive device (IED). He was severely injured, losing both legs and his left arm. It was only the quick response by the medic on patrol and the medevac crew that saved his life. He was treated in Queen Elizabeth Hospital Birmingham where he spent 45 days in the intensive care unit nearly succumbing to his injuries on more than one occasion. After several months and multiple operations Duley began his rehabilitation at DMRC Headley Court. In 2012 Duley returned to work.

=== TV & Media Appearances ===
Following his rehabilitation, Duley returned to Afghanhistan to document the surgical hospital run by EMERGENCY in Kabul, which was covered by the Channel 4 programme Walking Wounded: Return to the Frontline.

He has also presented documentaries for Channel 4's Unreported World. In 2022, he presented and produced six episodes of The One Armed Chef for VICE TV, a food and travel series described by the Guardian as “unmissable, warm-hearted films that don’t flinch from the realities of living in the shadow or aftermath of war”

Duley has been interviewed for BBC Radio 4’s The Food Programme and contributed to Last Word’s obituary of EMERGENCY founder Gino Strada following his passing in 2021. He has appeared on a number of podcasts including Catherine Fairweather’s Voices from the Frontline in collaboration with Frontline Club.

=== Humanitarian and charity work ===
In 2017 Duley founded Legacy of War Foundation, a charity working to support communities affected by conflict. He is currently CEO of the organisation which operates in countries including Rwanda, Lebanon and Ukraine, and seeks to challenge neocolonial paradigms in the development sector with projects including Land for Women which buys and transfers land to women’s cooperatives. In 2022 street artist Banksy launched a limited run of unique screenprints in 2022 to raise funds for their work in Ukraine explaining, "in Ukraine I saw a Legacy of War team sweep in and provide medical aid, attention, heaters, fresh water and a friendly face to some very desperate people in a bombed out building. They also lent me one of their ambulances to work from, which turned out to be extremely useful when an angry babushka found me painting on her building and called the Police”. In 2023, the organisation partnered with President of Ukraine Volodymyr Zelenskyy's fundraising initiative United24 to fund the reconstruction of residential buildings in Kyiv oblast with a single released by Robert Del Naja of the band Massive Attack, and Sviatoslav Vakarchuk of Ocean Elzy.

In 2023 Duley was announced as Angelia Jolie’s Corporate Impact Advisor for her New York-based Atelier Jolie. The pair were photographed by Annie Leibowitz for Vogue.

From 2022-2025 Duley was the first United Nations Global Advocate for Persons with Disabilities in Conflict and Peacebuilding Settings. Following the completion of his three year term, he criticised the failure of the UN system as well as the performative inclusion of people with disabilities in advocacy. He is a campaigner for inclusivity in the creative industry, most especially within TV and photography.

=== Honours and awards ===
Duley is a recipient of both the May Chidiac Award for Bravery in Journalism and the AIB Founders Award for Outstanding Achievement, and was awarded an Honorary master's degree in Photography from the University of Arts, Bournemouth. The film Walking Wounded: Return to the Frontline, won the Association for International Broadcasting (AIB) Award for Best International Current Affairs Documentary (2013) and the Foreign Press Association Award for TV Documentary Story of the Year (2013).

In 2010 his work was nominated for an Amnesty International Media Award and he was a winner at the PX3 - Prix de Paris.

In 2013 Duley received an Honorary Fellowship from the Royal Photographic Society which is given ′to distinguished persons having, from their position or attainments, an intimate connection with the science or fine art of photography or the application thereof′. In 2015 he was awarded the Women on the Move media award for his work highlighting the plight of Syrian refugees in Lebanon. In 2017 he was made an honorary citizen of Palermo by mayor Leoluca Orlando and included in the Sunday Times’ Alternative Rich List. Duley was also awarded the first IC2A Inspirational Medal after giving the inaugural IC2A Inspirational Lecture during the opening ceremony of the 16th World Congress of the International Society for Prosthetics and Orthotics. In 2019 he won an Amnesty International UK Media Award for his project "We are Only Here Because We Are Strong".

Duley was appointed Member of the Order of the British Empire (MBE) in the 2024 New Year Honours for services to survivors of conflicts. In 2026 he was announced as the winner of the Tipperary International Peace Award, and was honoured with the Hausman Humanitarian Award recognising “his work globally to improve the lives of people with disabilities”. He was named as one of the 2026 The Explorers Club 50 Extraordinary People, and is Explorer-in-Residence for Range Foundation.

== Quotes ==
- "And my realisation was this: food is the antithesis of war. Where war is about breaking apart communities and families, food is about bringing them together." Giles Duley, The Observer
- "I thought, 'Right hand? Eyes?'"—he realized that all of these were intact—"and I thought, 'I can work.'" Giles Duley, NYT
- It (loss of three limbs) is going to give me greater insight and empathy into people's suffering and hopefully put me in a better position to tell their stories. Because that's all I am, a storyteller." - Giles Duley, Becoming the Story.
- "These photographs remind us of our humanity and of the need for understanding and compassion if we want a peaceful world and a just one. The great English poet John Donne once wrote "No man is an island..... any man's death diminishes me, because I am involved in mankind, and therefore never send to know for whom the bell tolls; it tolls for thee." What he said in words Duley's compelling photographs tell us in pictures. They are a must for anyone who values the unity, tragedy and potential of the human condition." - Lord Ashdown
- "Different photographers can use the same camera or light, or all shoot the same frame. But what is different is the soul of the person behind the lens, and the moments they recognize and are drawn to—the emotional connection they make. That is what I love about Giles’s photography. Looking at his images, we can feel what he feels. It’s clear that he connects deeply to the human condition of people from all over the world. He himself has been through an ordeal. They say that adversity helps grow compassion, and Giles’s art certainly seems to bear that out." - Angelina Jolie
