= Alice Coffin =

French journalist (born 1978)

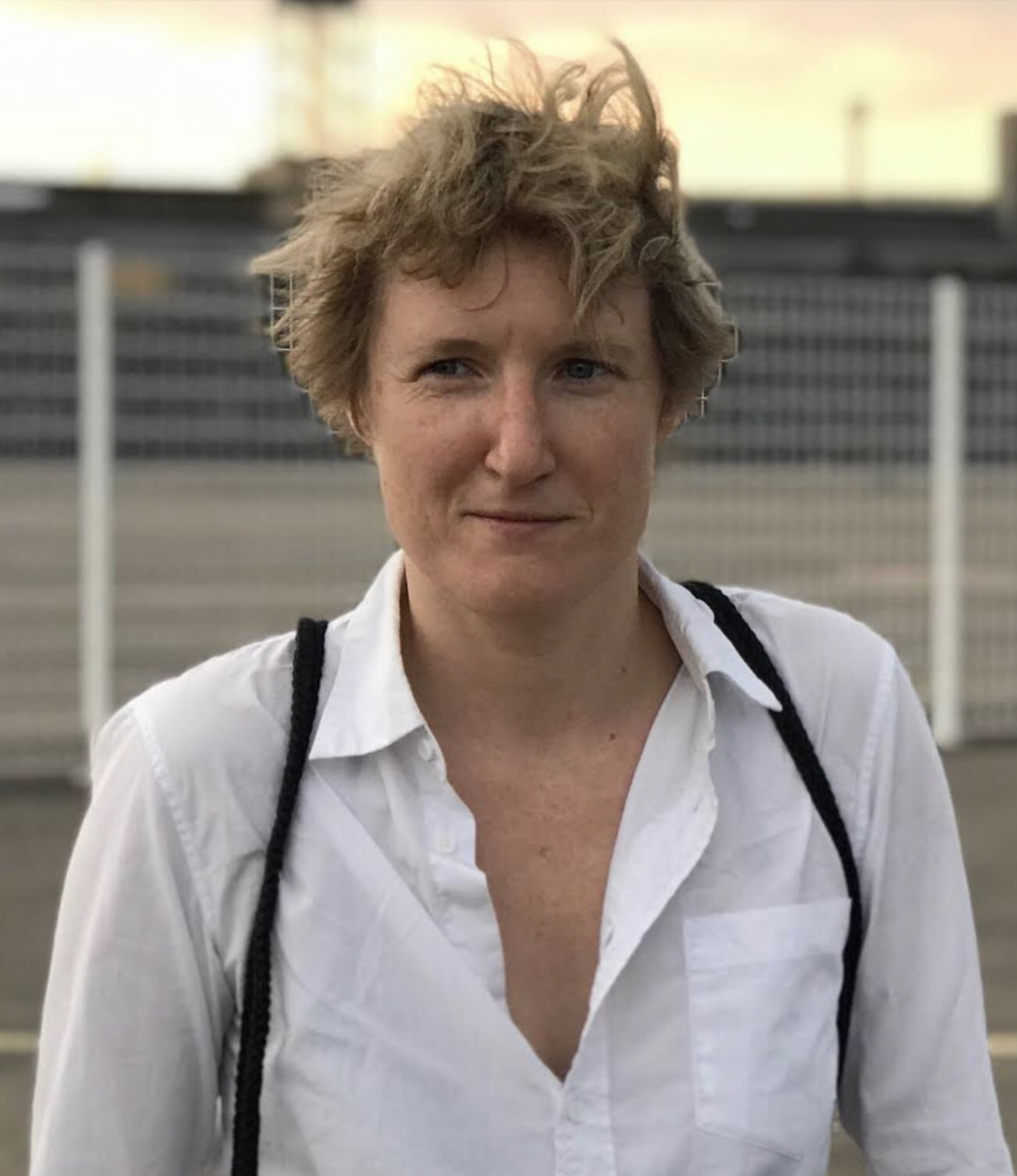
- Alice Coffin in 2019

Councillor of Paris
- Incumbent
- Assumed office 28 June 2020
- Mayor: Anne Hidalgo

Personal details
- Born: 29 April 1978 (age 48) Toulouse, France
- Party: Europe Ecology – The Greens
- Occupation: Activist

Alice Coffin (French pronunciation: [alis kɔfɛ̃]; born April 29, 1978) is a French journalist, feminist, lesbian activist and politician. She was elected to the Council of Paris in 2020. She is affiliated to the political party Europe Ecology – The Greens, without being a member of this party.

In 2020, she published Le Génie lesbien (The Lesbian Genius). In the book, she makes a case for women to banish men and masculine culture from their lives.

== Biography ==
She joined the feminist group La Barbe in 2010 and created the Association de journalistes LGBT along with other colleagues in 2013.

In June 2020, she was elected to the Council of Paris for the centre-left-to-left green political party Europe Ecology – The Greens.

== Controversy ==
In her 2020 essay Le Génie lesbien (The Lesbian Genius) Coffin urges women to eradicate men from their lives. She says she considered titling the essay ‘misandre’ (man-hater) and claims misandry to be an integral part of her feminism.

After the first round of the 2022 French Presidential Election, Alice Coffin denounced "political mediocrity" within the Green Party, and voiced the opinion that their candidate Yannick Jadot "had screwed up".

== Publications ==
- (fr) Le Génie lesbien (The Lesbian Genius), Grasset, 2020
