= Select (magazine) =

UK music magazine

- July 2000 issue
- Editor: Alexis Petridis
- Categories: Music tabloid
- Frequency: Monthly
- First issue: July 1990; 36 years ago
- Final issue: January 2001; 25 years ago
- Company: EMAP Metro
- Country: United Kingdom
- Based in: London
- Language: English
- ISSN: 0959-8367

Select was a United Kingdom music magazine of the 1990s. It was known for covering the indie rock and Britpop genres, but featured a wide array of music. In 2003, The Guardian called Select "the magazine that not only coined the word Britpop, but soon came to define it."

== History ==
The magazine was launched under United Consumer Magazines in July 1990, intending to be a rival to Q magazine. Its first cover star was Prince. Its first issue sold 100,000 copies. Between July and December 1990, its circulation hovered around 75,000. In April 1991, Spotlight sold Select to EMAP Metro. Under the editorship of Mark Ellen, the magazine began focusing on the baggy and Madchester scenes. The magazine soon became known for its coverage of Britpop, a term already in use in the music press by writer like John Robb but with an added new context in the magazine front cover by Stuart Maconie in its April 1993 "Yanks Go Home" edition, featuring The Auteurs, Denim, Saint Etienne, Pulp and Suede's Brett Anderson on the cover in front of a Union Flag. Several publications have called the April 1993 cover an important impetus in defining the movement's tone and opposition to American genres such as grunge.

Later, John Harris stepped down as editor, and was replaced by former Mixmag editor Alexis Petridis. Under Petridis, the magazine's image moved back towards its coverage of an eclectic array of music, aiming to reach what Petridis described as "a wide range of music fans". The magazine folded in late 2000, amid competition on the internet. Petridis later stated of its closure: "No matter how many features we did on Destiny's Child, people still thought we were a magazine about Oasis. We were forever associated with a music [genre] in decline."

== Tagline ==
- Pop Babylon! (circa 1994)
- You Love it (circa 1995/6)
- Music and Beyond (circa 1998)
- Music for Tomorrow (circa 2000)
- Total Stereo

== Contributors ==
- Andrew Perry, deputy editor
- Harry Borden, visual contributor
- Giles Duley
- John Harris
- Andrew Harrison
- Graham Linehan
- Steve Lowe, contributing editor
- Dorian Lynskey
- Stuart Maconie
- Sarra Manning
- Caitlin Moran
- John Mullen, contributing editor
- Sian Pattenden
- David Quantick
- Miranda Sawyer
- Cass Spencer, art editor
- Roy Wilkinson, reviews editor
