= Joëlle Sambi =

Activist and author (born 1979)

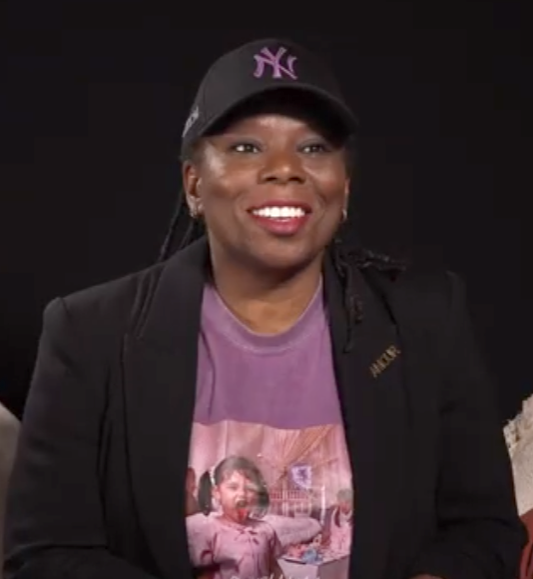
- Born: 1979 (age 46–47); Brussels
- Other name: Joëlle Sambi Nzeba

Joëlle Sambi or Joëlle Sambi Nzeba (born 1979) is an activist, author, poet and director.

== Early life and education ==
Sambi was born in Brussels in 1979, but at the age of five, moved with her family to Kinshasa in the Democratic Republic of the Congo. where she spent much of her childhood. She later returned to Belgium in 2001 to pursue information and communication, with a focus on journalism, at the Free University of Brussels.

== Career ==
Sambi is the author of several short stories and a novel. Her first literary success came in 2003 with the publication of Je ne Sais pas Rêver (meaning 'I do not know how to dream'), followed in 2005 by Religion Ya Kitendi (meaning 'religion of the fabric') published by Gallimard (Mercure de France), which placed in second at the Prix du Jeune Écrivain de Langue Française, a literary prize awarded to young francophone writers. Sambi also received the "Gros Sel" jury prize in 2008 for her novel Le Monde est Gueule de Chèvre (meaning 'the world is a goat's muzzle'), published by Biliki (Belgium 2007).

In addition to her literary works, Sambi is also a dynamic artist, producing slam poetry shows, films and workshops, including the documentary film P!nkshasa Diaspora.

Her artistic work frequently explores questions of identity, belonging, power and social inequality. As both an author and LGBT feminist activist, Joëlle Sambi writes and raises questions about identity, norms, belonging, she is caught between several languages and her writings bear the traces of this.

The Congo, its history and its relationship to contemporary Belgium are implicit in her stories as well as in her projects. Her relationship to language leads her writing to poetry and slam, which she regularly publishes on her blog: Solola Bien.

== Works ==
=== Books ===
- Je ne sais pas rêver (2003)
- Religion ya Kitendi (2005)
- Le Monde est Gueule de Chèvre (2007)
- Nouvelles du Congo - Récits de voyage (2016)
- Caillasses (2021)
- Et vos corps seront caillasses (2024)

=== Performances ===
- Congo Eza (2018): a slam poetry performance that brought together the slammers Joëlle Sambi, Lisette Lombé, and the hip-hop artist Badibanga Ndeka (BADI), directed by Rosa Gasquet. The project explored the intersection of Belgian and Congolese identity.
- Fusion (2021): a concert mixing slam poetry and krump, featuring Hendrickx Ntela, exploring police discrimination and violence.
- Angles morts (2021): a performance integrating slam poetry, dance and music, exploring micro-aggressions, violence and prejudice, while focusing on social class and the intersectionality of Sambi's identities as a Belgian-Congolese, black, lesbian, female author.
- Maison chaos (2024): a performance incorporating various artistic forms such as slam poetry, lyrical singing, electronic music, video and sound. The show concerns the paths chosen to escape violence.

=== Films ===
- P!nkshasa Diaspora: a documentary film following the queer Congolese diaspora.

== Activism ==
Sambi Nzeba is involved in feminist and LGBTQ+ activism. Her activism has focused particularly on the experiences of Black women and LGBTQ+ people, including people within the Congolese and African diaspora. She has participated in activist initiatives and cultural events such as Merhaba and the Massimadi Festival in Brussels. She has also served as the co-president of the The European Lesbian* Conference (EL*C). Her work connects artistic expression with questions about social power, discrimination, identity and belonging. She has described her feminism as being connected to her experiences of inequality and to the realization that gender can affect people's rights and freedoms. She has also discussed how different forms of discrimination, including gender, race and class, can intersect.
