= Insight (public organization) =

Ukrainian LGBTQI+ support organization

Insight public organization
- Formation: 2008
- Type: Non-governmental organization
- Location: Ukraine, Kyiv
- Leader: Olena Shevchenko
- Website: http://insight-ukraine.org/

Insight is a Ukrainian LGBTQI organization. Unlike most Ukrainian LGBT organizations focused on work with gay men and MSM, Insight’s priority is to help lesbians, bisexual women, transgender, queer and intersex people. Insight is one of the few public organizations in working with transgender people.

== History and activities ==
In 2007, Insight was founded by Olena Shevchenko, Anna Dovgopol and another activist. It was registered as an official organization in 2008.

In 2010, Insight with the financial support of ILGA Europe and ASTRAEA conducted the first in sociological study of the situation of transgender people «Situation of transgender persons in Ukraine».

In 2011, with the financial support of the Heinrich Böll Foundation (Warsaw) the first in Ukraine study of the situation of LGBT families «LGBT families in Ukraine: social practices and legal regulation» was conducted.

In 2012, with the financial support of amFAR the study «Civil rights of transgender people» was conducted.

In 2013, Insight presented the shadow report «Human Rights Violations of Lesbian, Gay, Bisexual, and Transgender (LGBT) People in Ukraine» at the 108th Session of the UN Human Rights Committee in Geneva, resulting in receiving 6 recommendations for SOGI by Ukraine after the Universal Periodic Review, 2 of which concerned the sex change procedure in Ukraine.

In 2014, with the support of the Norwegian Helsinki Committee for Human Rights Insight developed and published an illustrated textbook ABC of LGBT rights focused on a wide range of readers, and the brochure «Sexual orientation and gender identity: questions and answers».

On March 31, 2016, the International Transgender Day of Visibility, Insight published a brochure «Transgender people in Ukraine: social barriers and discrimination» which contains the most typical examples of violations of the rights of transgender people and legal comments to them.

In 2017, Anastasiia Yeva Domani began working with the organization, and later went on to co-found a Ukrainian transgender rights organisation called Cohort.

In 2020, Insight sued Patriarch Filaret for comments linking the COVID-19 pandemic to same-sex marriage.

In May 2021, events organised by Insight in Kyiv and Odesa were attacked by the far-right. In response to the attacks, the police claimed that no criminal action had occurred.

During the 2022 Russian invasion of Ukraine, Insight has been raising money to help provide LGBT people with temporary housing, food, medicines and relocation to safer areas.

In June 2023, the Insight office in Lutsk was attacked and vandalised.

== Cooperation ==
Insight is a part of the Coalition for Combating Discrimination in Ukraine, ILGA and Transgender Europe. Also, the organization is working with other Ukrainian human rights NGOs, in particular with the project No Borders of the Social Action Centre.
