= Anastasiia Yeva Domani =

Ukrainian activist

- Анастасія-Єва Доман
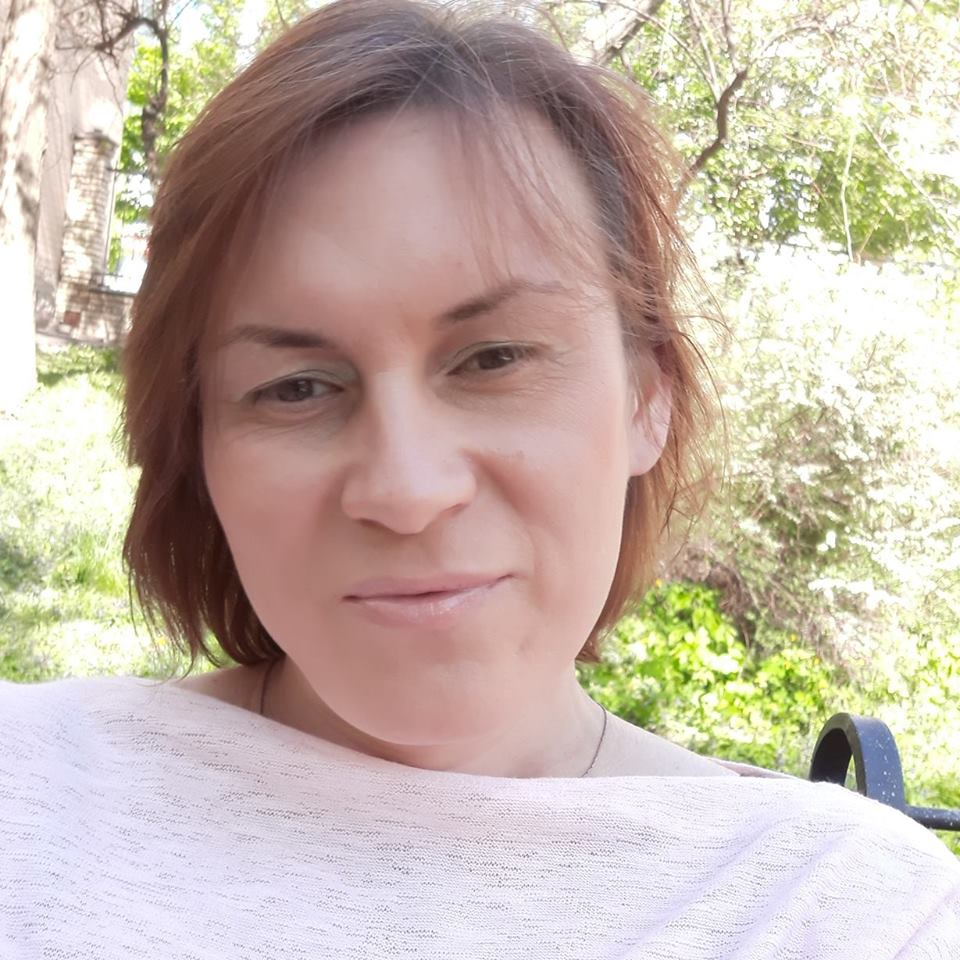
- An image of Yeva Domani
- Born: 1 February 1979 (age 47); Kyiv, Ukrainian SSR, Soviet Union
- Occupation: LGBT+ activist

Anastasiia Yeva Domani (Ukrainian: Анастасія-Єва Домані; born 1 February 1979) is a Ukrainian LGBT+ activist and co-founder of Cohort, a Ukrainian transgender rights organisation.

== Early life ==
She was born on 1 February 1979 in Kyiv, which was then part of the Ukrainian SSR in the Soviet Union, to a family with one other brother. She began presenting actively as a woman in 2000 when she went on work trips outside of Ukraine, prior to this she had only presented in private.

Before transitioning, Domani worked as a sports journalist and was a noted supporter of football club Dynamo Kyiv. She also worked in Poland for three years, developing a personal clothing brand for tights, and upon returning to Ukraine ran an online store.

== Activism ==
After realising that she was trans, she began organising local gatherings of other trans people. In 2017, she began working for LGBT+ rights organisation Insight. In 2020, she co-founded Cohort. Since the start of the Russian invasion of Ukraine, Cohort has provided humanitarian, financial, and medical assistance to transgender people during the war across major cities like Dnipro and Odesa, among others. The organisation has received funding from the Swedish Federation for Lesbian, Gay, Bisexual and Transgender Rights (RSFL) and GATE, but also more recently since the war they organisation has received donations from Outright International and ILGA-Europe.

She is also a representative of the transgender community to the Ukrainian National Council on HIV/AIDS and Tuberculosis.

== Personal life ==
When she was 27, she married her wife, after having dated for two and a half years prior. They have one daughter. In interviews, she stated she and her wife had serious conflicts following her transition and had discussed separating, but they remained married despite living apart. She currently lives in Kyiv.
