= Olena Shevchenko =

Ukrainian human rights activist (born 1982)

- Олена Шевченко
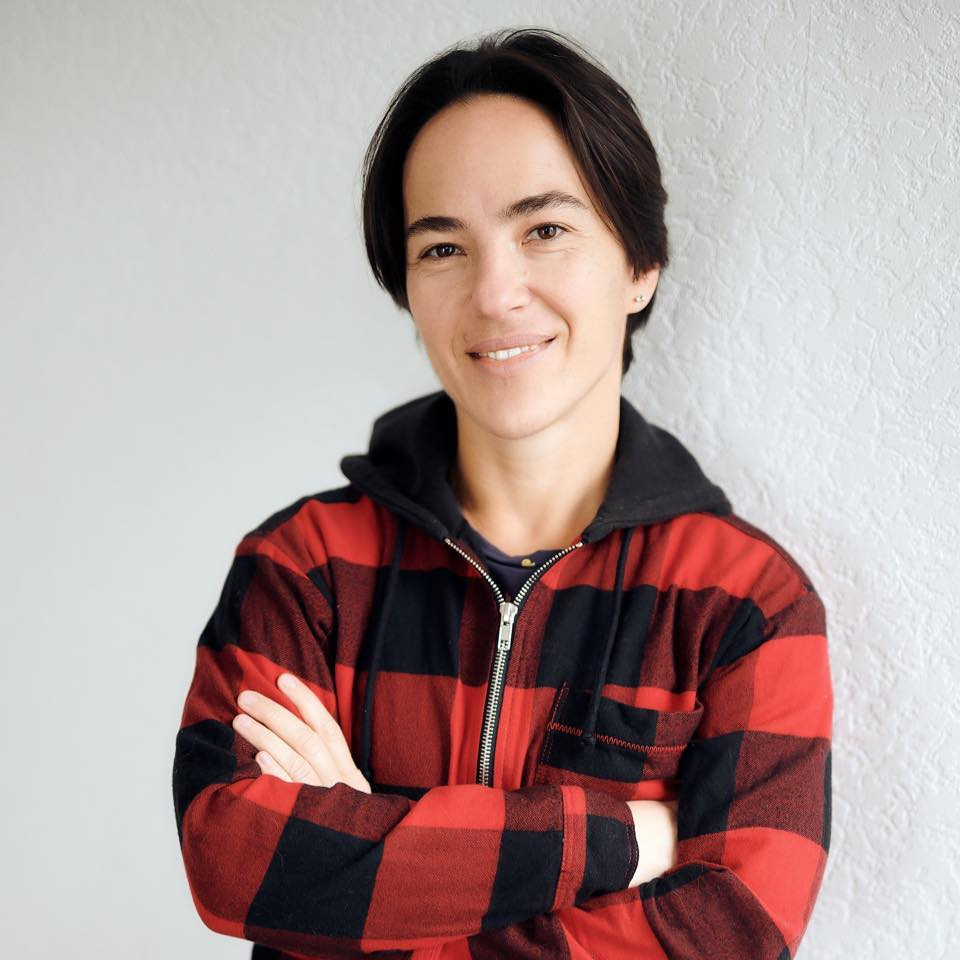
- Shevchenko in 2021
- Born: Olena Olehivna Shevchenko; 1982 (age 43–44); Kyiv, Ukraine
- Other name: Lena Shevchenko
- Occupations: Teacher, Women's and LGBT rights activist
- Years active: 2004

Olena Olehivna Shevchenko (Ukrainian: Олена Олегівна Шевченко; born 1982) is a Ukrainian women's and LGBT rights activist. After working as a teacher, she co-founded the NGO Insight in 2007 to advocate for LGBT inclusiveness on feminist platforms. She started annual events including Women's Day March, Transgender Day of Remembrance and the Festival of Equality, to protest against discrimination against women and the LGBT community in Ukraine and in other former Soviet countries. Her opponents have repeatedly attacked her and her events.

Shevchenko has also served as the co-chair of the LGBT Council of Ukraine, and was elected to the board of the International Lesbian, Gay, Bisexual, Transgender, Queer & Intersex Youth and Student Organisation (IGLYO). She is on the boards of the International Lesbian, Gay, Bisexual, Trans and Intersex Association's European branch, and the EuroCentralAsian Lesbian* Community (EL*C). She is one of the most visible LGBT activists in Ukraine and, in 2021, her human rights work was recognized with the Human Rights Tulip from the Dutch Ministry of Foreign Affairs. In 2022, she was awarded the Prix international de la ville de Paris pour les droits des personnes LGBTI+ (International Prize of the City of Paris for the Rights of LGBTI+ people) in recognition of Insight's work.

== Early life and education ==
Olena Olehivna Shevchenko, sometimes called Lena, was born in 1982, in the Darnytskyi District of Kyiv, while it was part of the Ukrainian Soviet Socialist Republic. Her father, who was Jewish, started work as a shoemaker, but later worked in construction. The family moved often and by the time she was in the first grade, they were living in one room of a guest house. From the age of nine, she began studying judo and also had an interest in freestyle wrestling, though it was a male-dominated sport. Shevchenko made the national wrestling team in high school and continued to participate in university. She is a pescatarian and avoids dairy products. From the time she was fourteen, Shevchenko knew she was a lesbian but did not know much about homosexuality until she turned twenty.

Shevchenko earned a gold medal when she graduated from high school and was honored in 2001 with the Student of Kyiv medal for Physical Culture and Sports. She went on to study in the life sciences faculty at the National Pedagogical Drahomanov University, receiving her teaching credentials with honors, and later earned a master's degree in sociology from the National University of Kyiv-Mohyla Academy. During university studies, she served as a freestyle wrestling coach for the Olympus Sports Club at Drahomanov University. In 2004, she took part in an unadvertised Pride run with ten other activists. The participants in the "Run for Life" wore rainbow bandanas and carried a handmade flag.

== Career ==
=== Teaching ===
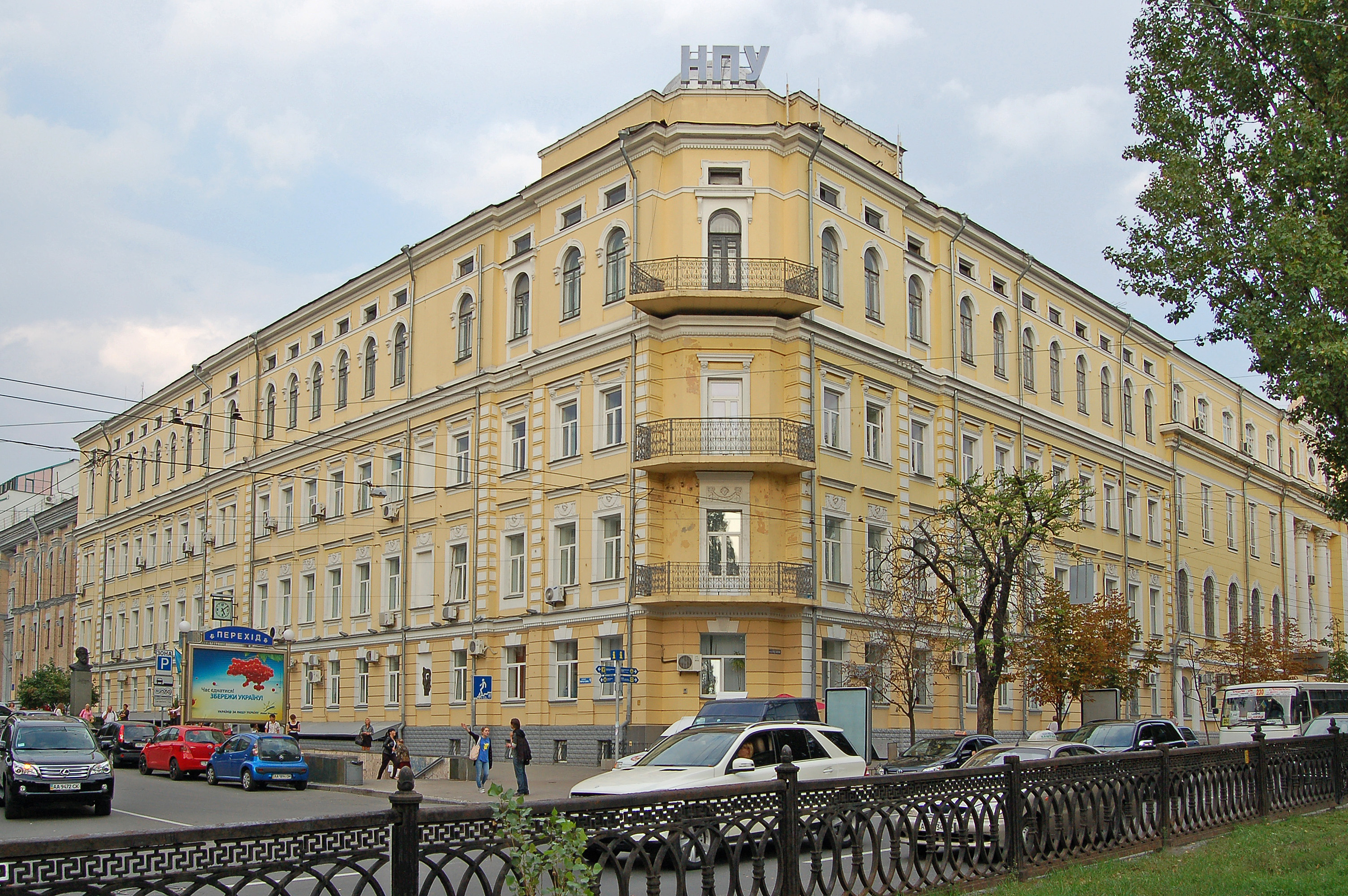
National Pedagogical Drahomanov University, Kyiv

After graduating, Shevchenko began teaching biology and physical education classes at Drahomanov University in 2004. She joined the Women's Network as a volunteer and began advocating for women's and LGBT rights. Teachers at her school were not happy that Shevchenko was open about her sexuality in television appearances and talked among themselves about whether she should be fired. A national initiative was sponsored during her teaching period to ban LGBT teachers from universities and she began speaking against the legislation. In 2007 she came out to her parents. Her mother was not accepting but her father was tolerant.

Also in 2007, she left the Women's Network and co-founded an NGO named Insight with Anna Dovgopol and another activist. The goals of the organization were to advocate for LGBT inclusiveness on a feminist platform. Insight was officially registered in 2008 and in 2009, Shevchenko resigned from teaching to work at the NGO full time.

=== Initiating activism ===
In 2010, Shevchenko became chair of Insight. Because of threats to herself and the staff, she and the organization move every year or two and do not publicize a location. In 2011, Shevchenko and other activists from groups including Insight, the Feminist Offensive, and the Center for Visual Culture planned a Women's Day March in Kyiv, with both men and women participating. The March has become an annual tradition, but since 2012 marchers have risked being attacked by far-right opponents. As there had been no openness in society, the push for human rights resulted in a backlash from more traditional elements in Ukraine, who preferred gays and lesbians to remain hidden and women to serve only in customary roles. In 2012, Shevchenko was elected as co-chair of an umbrella organization, the LGBT Council of Ukraine. She has become one of the most visible activists in Ukraine, participating in many events that raise the visibility of the LGBT community and promote awareness of the intersectionality of women's rights with other marginalized groups in the country. Journalist Teresa Lashchuk reported that Shevchenko "is probably the most famous lesbian in Ukraine".

Shevchenko has taught self-defense courses to women activists, who are often threatened with violence for speaking out as feminists. She orchestrates lobbying efforts to change legislation aimed at sterilization of transgender people or which permit discrimination against marginalized groups. She advocates for changes in the educational system so that, for example, textbooks do not limit male and female roles to stereotypical spheres. She also documents threats and attacks against them and conducts training for physicians, psychologists and the police to ensure that human rights are protected. To spread acceptance, she also organizes educational conferences and exhibitions, cultural festivals, and film screenings.

In 2012, Shevchenko was detained for demonstrating on International Human Rights Day in protest of legislation limiting the right of assembly using bans labeled as promotion of homosexuality. Though activists initially had a permit, the venue was later barred, after a judge ruled that the protest might provoke conservative opposition and the police indicated reluctance to offer protection. Knowing that the permit was tied to the venue, Shevchenko requested a new location, but according to police the assembly was illegal and she was arrested along with seven other protestors and five counter-demonstrators. She was convicted of having violated the regulations of assembly and fined. She lost her appeal of the verdict in 2013.

=== Euromaidan and its aftermath ===
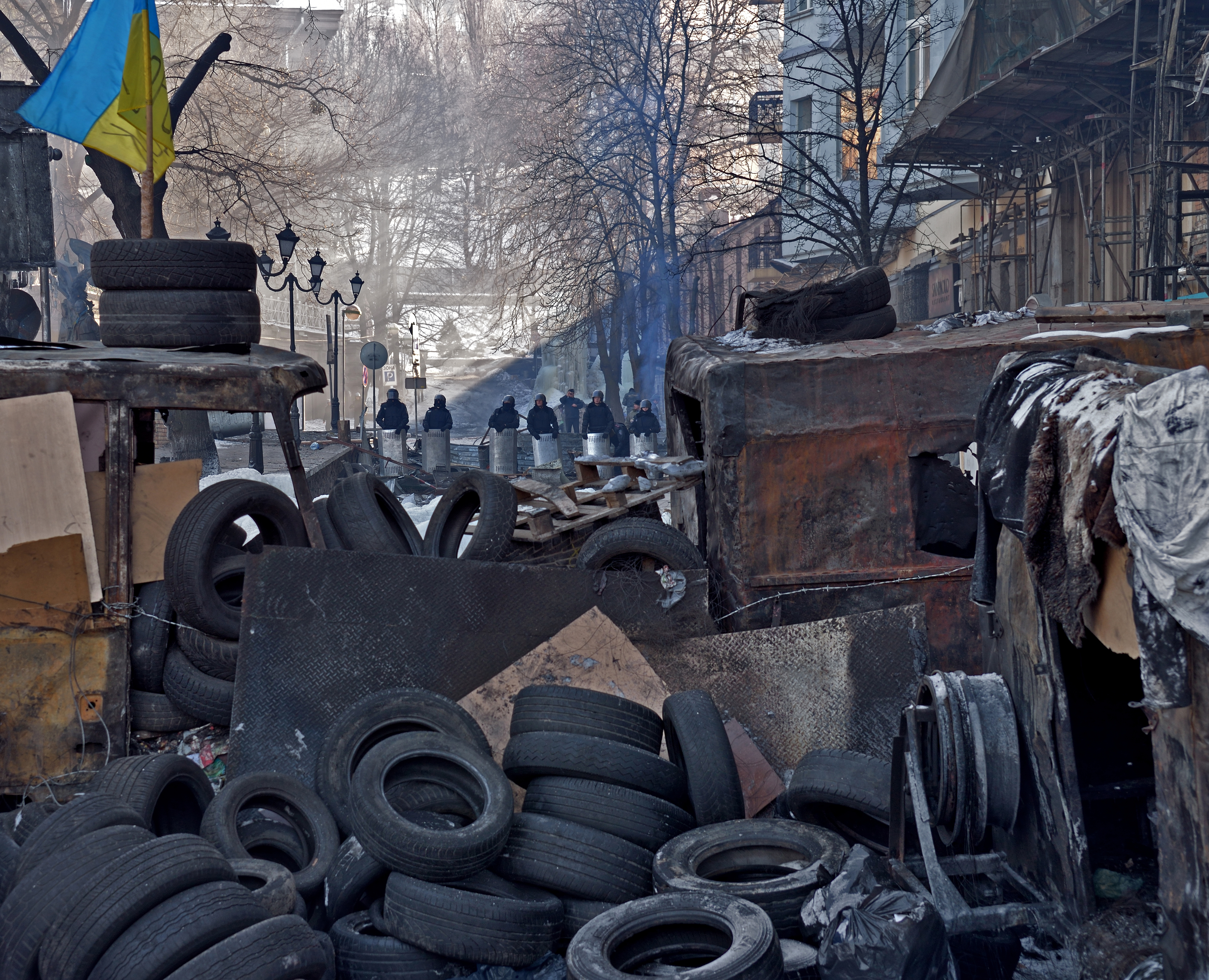
Barricades erected during Euromaidan in 2014 in Kyiv

In 2013, civil unrest interests in the country launched Euromaidan, a protest against the government decision to form closer ties with Russia and move away from Europe. Shevchenko joined with other activists in Maidan Nezalezhnosti (Independence Square), but because of her background in sport, refused to be relegated to providing food in the camp kitchen. Instead, she joined the camp security patrols, organizing and training women to keep the barricades secure. That year, the Women's March focus was on opposing pending legislation to ban abortions and criminalize homosexuality. When the government of Viktor Yanukovych finally fell in February 2014, Shevchenko expressed hope that a new era of respect for human rights would prevail.

When the annexation of the Crimean Peninsula by Russian forces caused refugees to flee the area, Shevchenko tried to convince landlords to house displaced members of the LGBT community. Prejudices against gays and lesbians made choices limited, but in the summer of 2014, the first shelter for queer people opened in Kyiv. The venue provided short-term housing, counseling and medical services, tips for finding employment, and passes for the transportation system. After two years, foreign funding dried up and Insight redirected funds raised from other projects to keep the shelter going.

=== Human rights activism ===
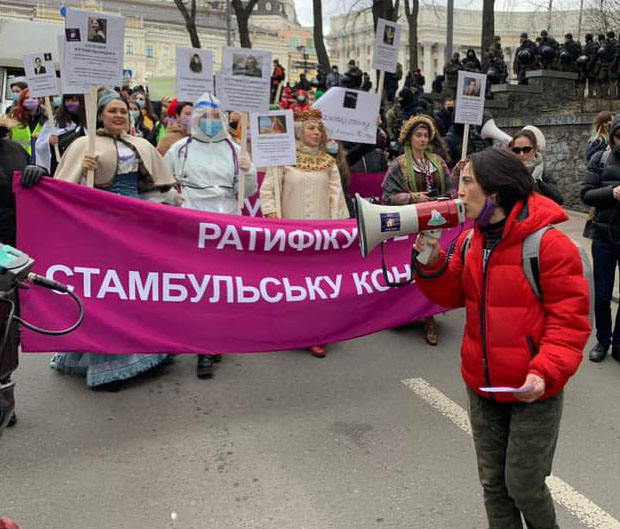
Shevchenko leading the 2021 Women's March in Kyiv

Though Shevchenko chaired the committee that planned the 2014 Equality March for Kyiv, the event had to be canceled when police notified her that they would be unable to provide security. Similarly, that year the Women's March was canceled. From 2014, Shevchenko worked with other organizations like the Coalition against Discrimination, Commissioner for Human Rights, the International Renaissance Foundation's Human Rights and Justice Program, and Without Borders, to create the Festival of Equality. Encouraging participants to fight against discrimination, the annual event includes lectures, workshops on developing protest movements, film screenings, and photographic exhibitions. From 2015, the Women's March began to focus on the broader topic of inequality, rather than on protests against specific legislation. The shift did not eliminate attacks on activists but was able to protect and expand the methods used to fight for human rights, socio-economic parity, and de-escalation of violence in an increasingly militarized society. Shevchenko was one of the participants in the PinchukArtCentre's 2015 exhibit, Patriots, Citizens, Lovers…, which featured the art of Carlos Motta and included interviews with eleven activists highlighting queer culture and discussing the history and issues faced in their community.

In 2016, during the Festival of Equality in Lviv, Shevchenko reported that sixty of the two hundred activists registered were able to make it to the conference hall, which was surrounded by opponents of the event. A bomb threat was received and attendees were evacuated after about four hours. When they prepared to leave after the festival, opponents began pelting them with rocks and pepper spray. Firecrackers were thrown at the bus in which Shevchenko was riding. Festival participants were not provided with police protection and Shevchenko received reports that the protesters were looking for her. Volunteers and their relatives rescued her, took her to their own home and fed her, and after darkness fell arranged a taxi to take her to the train station so that she could return to Kyiv. Because of repeated threats to her security, in 2017 Shevchenko was enrolled in the Civil Rights Defenders's Natalia Project. The service sets off an alarm via a GPS transmitter to alert colleagues when she is in imminent danger.

Both the 2017 and 2018 Women's Marches focused on anti-violence. Protesters were attacked during the 2017 event by opponents who threw vegetables at them, but in 2018, opponents on the right staged a counter-protest instead of attacking demonstrators. After the event Shevchenko was sued by right-wing radicals who claimed that the use of a Ukrainian trident on a poster at the Women's March was disrespectful of a national symbol of the National Squad, a paramilitary group associated with the Azov Regiment. She was accused of violating the Administrative Code, which requires organizers of events to ensure that state symbols are not violated or presented to the public in an offensive manner. The inspector of the Shevchenkivsky District Police Department stated during the hearing that she should have foreseen that the poster would cause alarm and prevented its use. Shevchenko testified she had no prior knowledge of the poster, nor had she seen it. The judge ruled that there were no such legal regulations that had been passed outlining procedures for enforcing the Administrative Code, thus under the covenants of the European Convention on Human Rights, Shevchenko could not be charged or held responsible for the poster or its content.

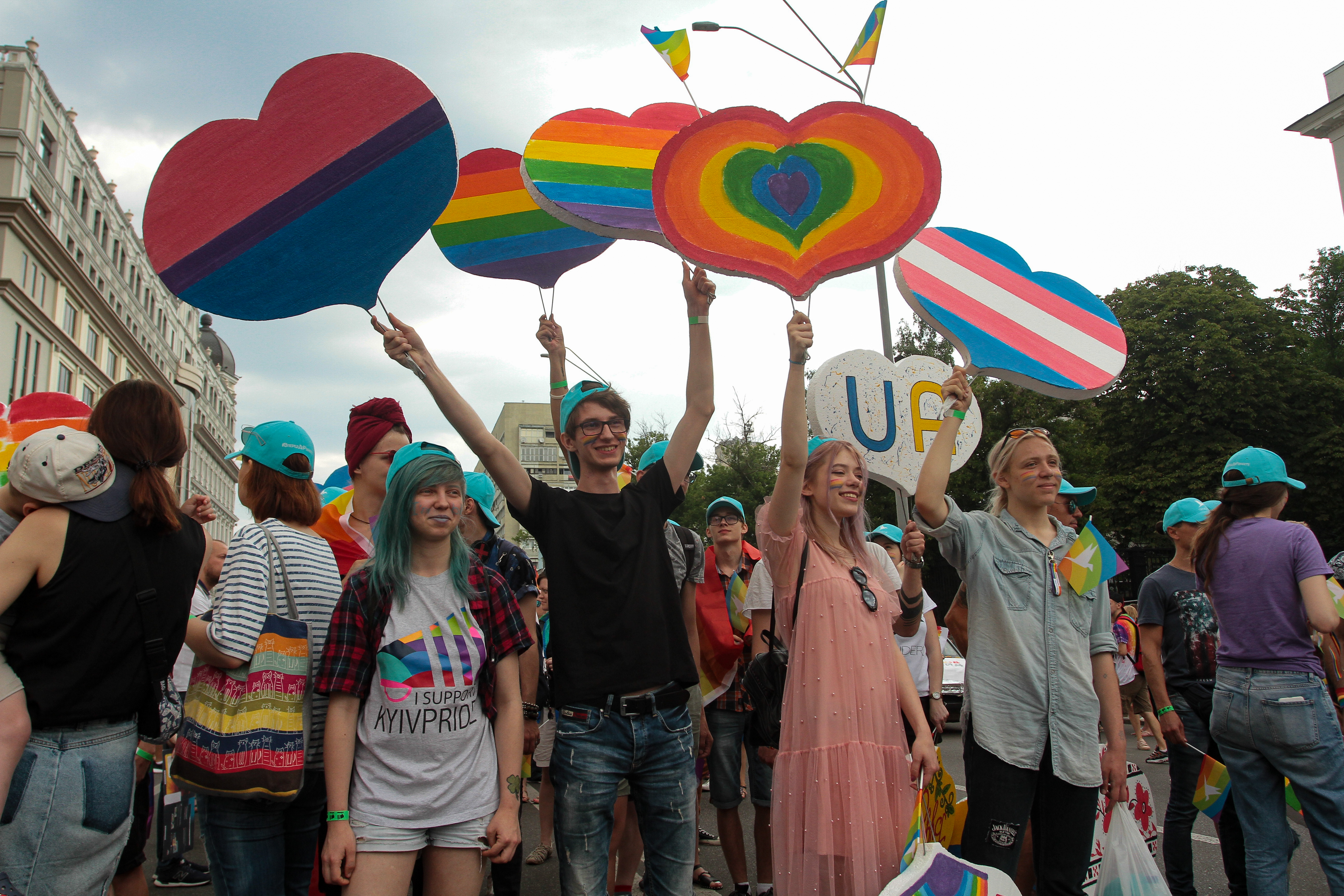
2019 Equality Parade, Kyiv

At the Festival of Equality held in Chernivtsi in 2018, right-wing radicals, accompanied by priests, attempted to prevent attendees from accessing the venue. After several hours, thirty participants managed to enter the venue, but they were gassed and hammers were thrown at them. Shevchenko and a government official urged the radicals to find a different means to show their opposition. That year during the Transgender Day of Remembrance march, Shevchenko and other activists were targeted by opponents who threw smoke bombs at the crowd. Two people were injured after they were gassed. In response, the police, who were unable to restrain the opponents, stopped the demonstration, dividing the activists and forcing them onto the subway trains. During Pride festivities in 2018, opponents posted threats of a safari hunt for LGBT activists in Ukraine, posting proposed "points" that would be given to hunters for attacking leading activists like Shevchenko. In 2019 Shevchenko was personally attacked in Kyiv, when two assailants beat her while yelling homophobic slurs.

At the outbreak of the COVID-19 pandemic in March 2020, former patriarch Filaret of the Ukrainian Orthodox Church – Kyiv Patriarchate blamed the global spread of the disease on sin, and specifically on same-sex marriage. In response, Shevchenko and Insight launched a lawsuit in April at the Shevchenkivskyi District Court against him for spreading disinformation which could provoke violence against the LGBT community. Their demands were that the television channel which carried the interview with Filaret withdraw his claims and that the church publish a statement disavowing his statement. In response, the church stated that as an honorary patriarch, as a clergyman, and as an individual, Filaret had the freedom to express his views on morality. Because of movement restrictions due to the pandemic and previous positions of the court in such matters, Diana Krechetova, a journalist for the Associated Press, reported that the lawsuit was likely to be dismissed. No action had yet been taken in September, when it was reported that Filaret had contracted COVID.

On 10 May 2026, Shevchenko was attacked by six unidentified men, alongside Anastasiia Gerasymenko, while taking part in a protest against proposed changes to the Ukrainian civil code in Ivano-Frankivsk. It was reported that the local police were initially reluctant to accept her report of the assault.

=== International work ===
In 2010, Shevchenko was elected to serve a two-year term on the board of directors of the International Lesbian, Gay, Bisexual, Transgender, Queer & Intersex Youth and Student Organisation (IGLYO). She was elected to serve on the board of the European branch of the International Lesbian, Gay, Bisexual, Trans and Intersex Association (ILGA) in 2016, and was reelected for further terms in 2018 and in 2020. She has served on the board of the EuroCentralAsian Lesbian* Community (EL*C) since its founding in 2016. EL*C plans the European Lesbian* Conferences, which aim to inform and create lesbian networks to support community members.

In 2019, Shevchenko lobbied successfully for the European Lesbian* Conference to be held in Kyiv to bring visibility to the lesbian community. That conference was attacked by opponents who launched tear gas and broke windows with baseball bats, despite protection of local police and private security. Shevchenko asked the conference audience, "Are you scared?", as they applied milk to their tear-gassed eyes. The 350 people in attendance from forty-two countries chorused, "No!", in reply.

In addition to planning and coordinating international events, Shevchenko has been a featured speaker at numerous conferences and events, such as EuroPride in Riga, Latvia in 2015, the 2017 El*C Conference in Vienna, Austria, and the Norwegian Helsinki Committee's annual conference in Oslo in 2019. In 2022, she participated in an internet conference, "Global Conversations Towards Queer Social Justice: Queer Dis/Placements", sponsored by Cambridge University's Centre for Research in the Arts, Social Sciences and Humanities. Shevchenko was honored with the Human Rights Tulip from the Dutch Ministry of Foreign Affairs for her pioneering work in human rights in 2021. The following year, she was honored along with Insight with the fourth Prix international de la ville de Paris pour les droits des personnes LGBTI+ (International Prize of the City of Paris for the Rights of LGBTI+ People) for her continuing support of the LGBT community, despite the Russian invasion of Ukraine.

=== War work ===
In 2022, when Russia invaded Ukraine, Shevchenko initially planned to remain in Kyiv. When bombings reached her neighborhood, she evacuated to Lviv on 10 March. From there, she reorganized Insight's functions to provide relief efforts for women and children. With the help of El*C, she worked to set up a shelter for displaced people. Activists established two safe houses on the Polish border and began creating networks with teams in Bulgaria, Moldova, and Romania to strengthen their regional outreach and ability to assist Shevchenko inside Ukraine. Lesbian and queer refugees and their children who need to leave Ukraine are given a phone number to establish contact with El*C activists on the other side of the border, who take them to the shelters and provide basic support, until a more permanent placement abroad can be made. After establishing shelters across the border, Shevchenko began to organize safe havens in western Ukraine. While unloading donations of goods from a delivery vehicle in April, Shevchenko was attacked and sprayed with mace by an unknown assailant. Despite the attack, she continues to organize relief efforts shipping goods throughout the country to ensure that women, typically ignored during war efforts in favor of combatants, had adequate food and supplies.

The Times named Olena Shevchenko as Women Of The Year in 2023. In an interview she spoke about her involvement during the war and emphasized the precarious situation for women and LGBTQI people: ″Why are you talking just about women? Why not men? Why not everybody?” she says, outlining the arguments she regularly encounters. The reality, she says, is that these communities are especially vulnerable during the war: LGBTQI people face fierce discrimination from fellow Ukrainians; most humanitarian aid doesn’t account for those with disabilities; and “the level of sexual violence during the war — you can’t imagine.″

== Selected works ==
Shevchenko has written numerous reports and co-authored several human rights studies. Among them is a dictionary of LGBT terms in Ukrainian. Others include:

- Лисенко, Т.; Шевченко, О.; Покальчук, О., eds. (2012). Дотримання громадянських прав трансгендерних людей [Respect for the Civil Rights of Transgender People] (Report) (in Ukrainian). Kyiv, Ukraine: Insight. Archived from the original on 16 May 2021.
- Шевченко, Олена; Франк, Юрій, eds. (2014). Абетка з прав ЛГБТ [The LGBT Rights ABC] (PDF) (Report) (in Ukrainian). Kyiv, Ukraine: Insight. Archived (PDF) from the original on 24 October 2018.
- Shevchenko, Olena; Huz, Oksana; Semenova, Olha; Movcha, Uliana, eds. (2019). Human Rights of LBTIQ Women in Ukraine (PDF) (Report). Kyiv, Ukraine: UN Women, Global Affairs Canada. OCLC 1310273210. Archived (PDF) from the original on 19 June 2022.
- Shevchenko, Olena (2019). "Women Living with HIV / Women with Diverse Sexual Orientations and Gender Identities". In Porokhnyak-Hanovska, Lyudmyla; Rudenko, Maryna; Kebalo, Martha Kichorowska; Skoryk, Marfa; Davlikanova, Olena (eds.). Beijing +25 Years on: Parallel Report Ukraine 2014–2019. Translated by Dmytriyeva, Maria. Kyiv, Ukraine: Friedrich-Ebert-Stiftung. ISBN 978-617-7574-05-6.
