= Random Acts =

Global non-profit organization

- Formation: 2010
- Founder: Misha Collins, Philip Schneider
- Legal status: 501(c)3
- Purpose: Funding acts of kindness across the world
- Region served: North America, South America, Europe, Asia, Africa, Australia
- Website: https://randomacts.org/

Random Acts is a global nonprofit 501(c)3 organization that funds and facilitates acts of kindness across the globe. Founded in 2010, the organization is managed by a 100% volunteer staff, with regional branches established in North America, South America, Europe, Africa, Asia, and Australia. Random Acts funds hundreds of acts of kindness across the world each year, ranging from large scale projects and partnerships to individual and community-driven acts of kindness in local communities.

== History ==
Random Acts was founded in January 2010 by actor Misha Collins in response to the 2010 Haiti Earthquake. Shortly after the crisis, Collins encouraged his Twitter followers to band together in support of the Haitian community.

His social media posts received a positive response and generated over $30,000 in donations to relief charities. Inspired by the power of his followers’ collective desire to collaborate on acts of social good, Collins and his associate and friend, social venture entrepreneur Philip Schneider, co-founded Random Acts with a goal of fostering grassroots social action.

Since its inception, Random Acts has launched initiatives in countries all around the world, including large-scale projects in Haiti and Nicaragua. The organization has also launched programs in response to humanitarian causes in countries such as Syria, South Africa, Rwanda, Ukraine, and Laos, including child hunger, food equity, and hurricane aid.

== Overview ==
Random Acts is managed by over 100 volunteers from six continents and is led by a board of directors (including Collins, who serves as Board President). Board members also include Schneider and actress, producer, and philanthropist Danneel Ackles. Rachel Miner, who served as the organization’s Executive Director from 2017 to 2025, also sits on the board.

=== Charity Work in Haiti ===
Between 2011 and 2013, Random Acts staff and volunteers assisted in building a community center for children in need within the Haitian community.

=== Charity Work in Nicaragua ===
In 2012, the organization donated a school bus to a rural Nicaraguan community to make it easier for students to attend school.

Between 2015 and 2018, Random Acts assisted with building a Center of Human Development campus in this same community, which houses the pre-existing Free High School of San Juan del Sur.

=== Early Kindness Initiatives ===
Annual Melee of Kindness (AMOK)/SPARK was an annual event that promoted acts of kindness in local communities.

Endure for Kindness (E4K) was an annual pledge-style fundraising event where participants would do the act of their choice for as long as possible to raise money for Random Acts.

Class Act was a school-based initiative that encouraged classes to promote kindness and positivity within their communities.

=== Change a Life Initiatives ===
The Change a Life initiative is an ongoing program that provides funding and support to global communities in need. In 2017, Random Acts helped provide funding for the Dancescape South Africa dance school.

In 2018, Random Acts partnered with the Legacy of War Foundation to empower women who survived the 1994 Rwandan genocide by providing land and funding educational initiatives. Giles Duley, founder and CEO of Legacy of War Foundation, has collaborated with Random Acts on multiple Change a Life initiatives.

=== Crisis Support Network Collaboration ===
In 2016, Random Acts partnered with organizations Crisis Support Network, IMAlive, and To Write Love on Her Arms to help train crisis responders and to provide a supportive space for individuals coping with individuals in need.

=== Hurricane Relief Initiatives ===
In 2018, Random Acts worked with The Family Business Beer Co to help communities in Texas, Puerto Rico, and the US Virgin Islands that were affected by the 2017 hurricanes.

=== Childhood Hunger Campaign ===
Random Acts, along with Creation Entertainment and several Supernatural cast members, supported the nonprofit organization Move for Hunger, which helps distribute surplus food to communities that need it. Events like the Bad Idea Tour (hosted by Supernatural cast members) and the Amica Seattle Marathon (which was participated in by multiple Supernatural cast members) helped fund this cause.

In 2021, Collins kick-started the #RAServingHope campaign, encouraging supporters to prepare meals on the MLK Day of Service.

=== Food Equity Campaign ===
In 2021, Random Acts launched a food equity campaign that provided funding to various urban farming communities.

=== Ongoing Acts Program ===
Random Acts currently funds acts of kindness in communities all over the world. Applicants can submit itemized budgets for their kindness ideas, which can receive up to $499 of funding from the organization.

== Awards ==
Random Acts won the Best Charity award at the 4th Shorty Awards and 5th Shorty Awards ceremonies, an award show that recognizes figures, organizations, and influencers doing notable work in digital spaces. The organization was a finalist in the 6th and 7th award seasons until the award category was removed the following year.

== Charity Rating ==
For the 2023 fiscal year, charity rating platform Charity Navigator gave Random Acts a 4/4-star, 99% rating upon reviewing its key accountability metrics, tax form disclosures and policies, website disclosures, and financial data.
