= Faika El-Nagashi =

Austrian politician (born 1976)

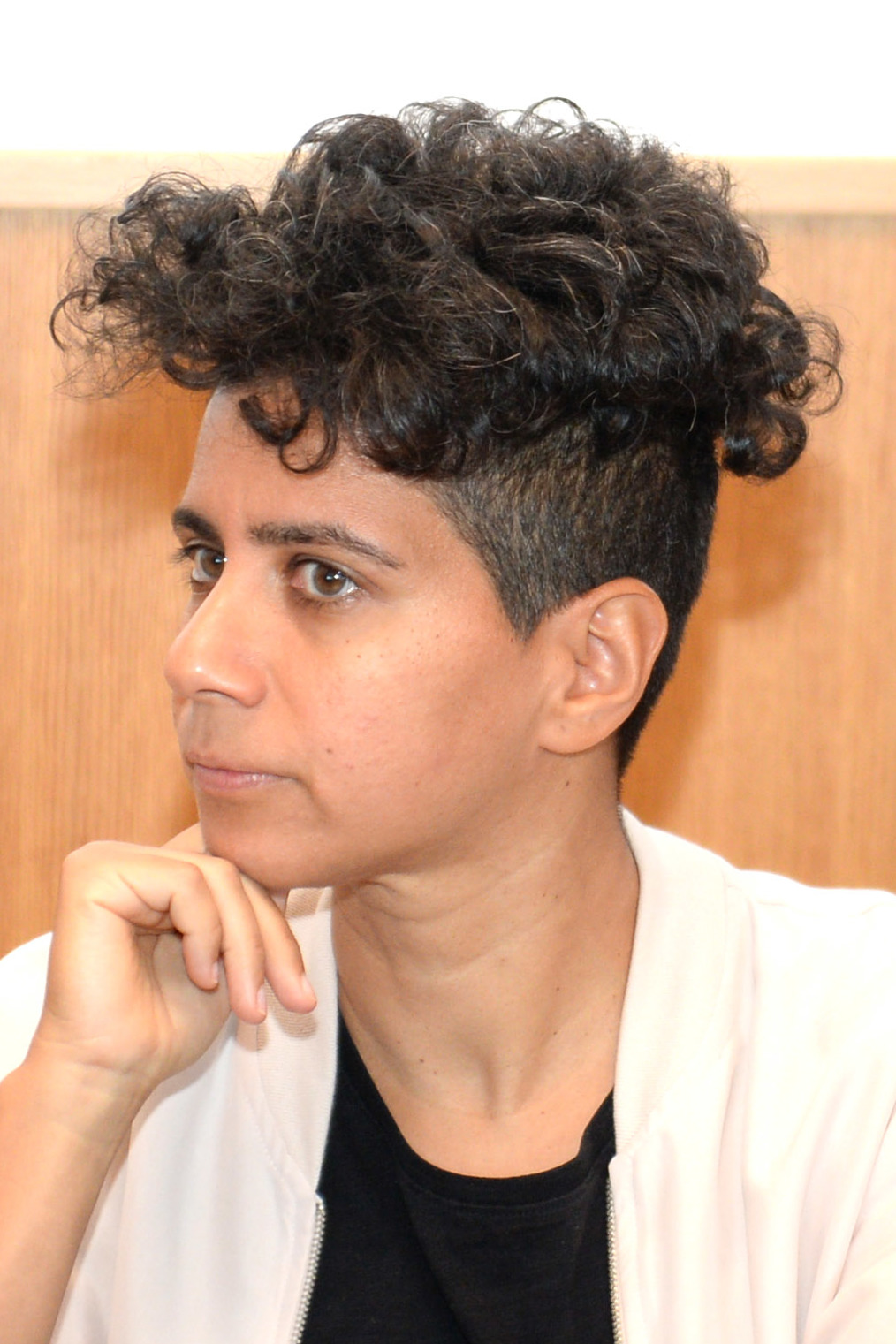
- El-Nagashi in 2017
- Born: 3 September 1976 (age 49); Budapest, Hungary
- Education: University of Vienna
- Occupation: Politician
- Political party: Green Party of Austria (until 2025)

Faika El-Nagashi or Faika Anna El-Nagashi (born 3 September 1976) is an Austrian politician. She resigned from the Austrian Green Party in 2025, after repeated calls for her expulsion from the party over her anti-trans views.

== Early life ==
El-Nagashi was born in 1976 in Budapest. She has Hungarian and Egyptian heritage. She spent her childhood in the Simmering district of Vienna before attending the University of Vienna in 2003 to study Political Science. She completed her course in 2009 having written about migrant sex workers. In 2004, she became active in general in human rights relating to Eastern Europe and the European Community. She has represented the rights of sex workers.

== Political career ==
On 24 November 2015, she became a Green Party councillor in Vienna and a member of the Vienna Provincial Parliament. On the 12th of June 2025, she left the Green Party, citing disagreements about transgender people. There had been calls for her expulsion from the party for several years.

== Personal life ==
El-Nagashi is openly lesbian. In October 2017, she spoke alongside Ulrike Lunacek and Phyll Opoku-Gyimah and the opening speech of the first European Lesbian* Conference in Vienna.
