= Catherine Fairweather =

British journalist and magazine editor

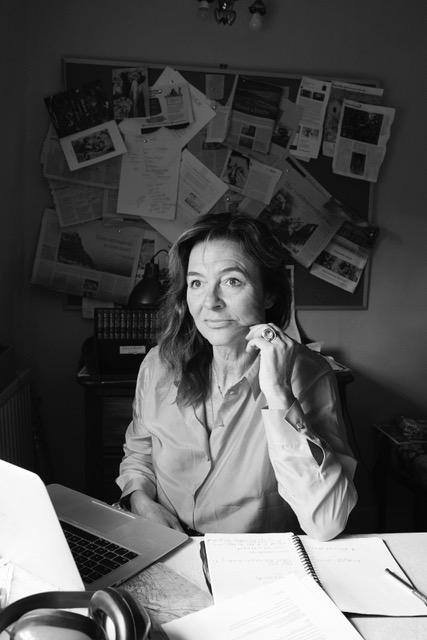
- Occupations: Journalist; editor; podcaster
- Employer: Harper's Bazaar (formerly)
- Spouse: Sir Don McCullin (m. 2002)

Catherine Fairweather, Lady McCullin is a British journalist, editor, and podcaster. Fairweather contributes to Financial Times, Air Mail, Condé Nast Traveller, where she is a contributing editor, The Daily Telegraph, and Harper's Bazaar.

== Career ==
Fairweather was previously a travel editor at Harper's Bazaar. A bi-annual supplement, Harper's and Queen Abroad, was edited by Fairweather upon its launch in 1997. She jointly edited a Kuoni Travel-sponsored supplement, The World's 100 Best Spas, launched in 2001.

An Evening Standard reviewer said the "homes of the rich and famous, such as the McAlpines, the Spenders, the Guinnesses and Gore Vidal, and some not so famous..." are highlighted in Fairweather's book La Dolce Vita: Living in Italy, which was published by Pavilion Books in 2001 with photographs from Mark Luscombe-Whyte. Gourmet Traveller magazine called it a "visual treat". It was also reviewed in Travel + Leisure and Southern Accents magazines.

In a 2001 column in The Independent on how "intelligence is all the rage", Terence Blacker wrote of Fairweather's work at Harper's & Queen magazine: "...her magazine would not, five years ago, have dreamt of covering, for example, the literary festival at Hay-on-Wye. Now, presumably if the Tatler or Country Life are not there first, they do."

Fairweather co-produces and presents The Third Act, a podcast on later life. It was recommended in the Daily Mail. Fairweather also hosts the podcast Voices from The Frontline, focused on lives shaped by conflict in collaboration with the Frontline Club.

== Personal life ==
Fairweather is married to the photojournalist Don McCullin. They married in 2002 after being introduced by travel writer Mark Shand. By 2018, they lived in a Somerset village with their son.
