= La Barbe =

French feminist group

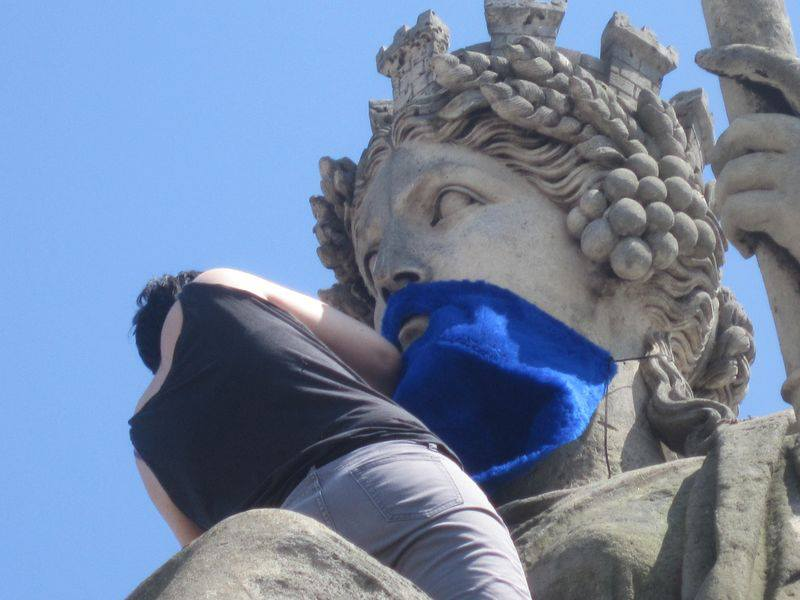
- La Barbe, national day, Paris, place de la Nation, July 2013
- Abbreviation: La Barbe
- Formation: 2008; 18 years ago
- Type: NGO
- Purpose: Women rights
- Headquarters: Paris, France
- Location: Paris
- Official language: French

La Barbe (The Beard) is a French feminist group. It was founded in 2008. It aims at denouncing the absence or under-representation of women in contemporary culture. This includes influence and power dynamics in politics, economics and media.

== History ==
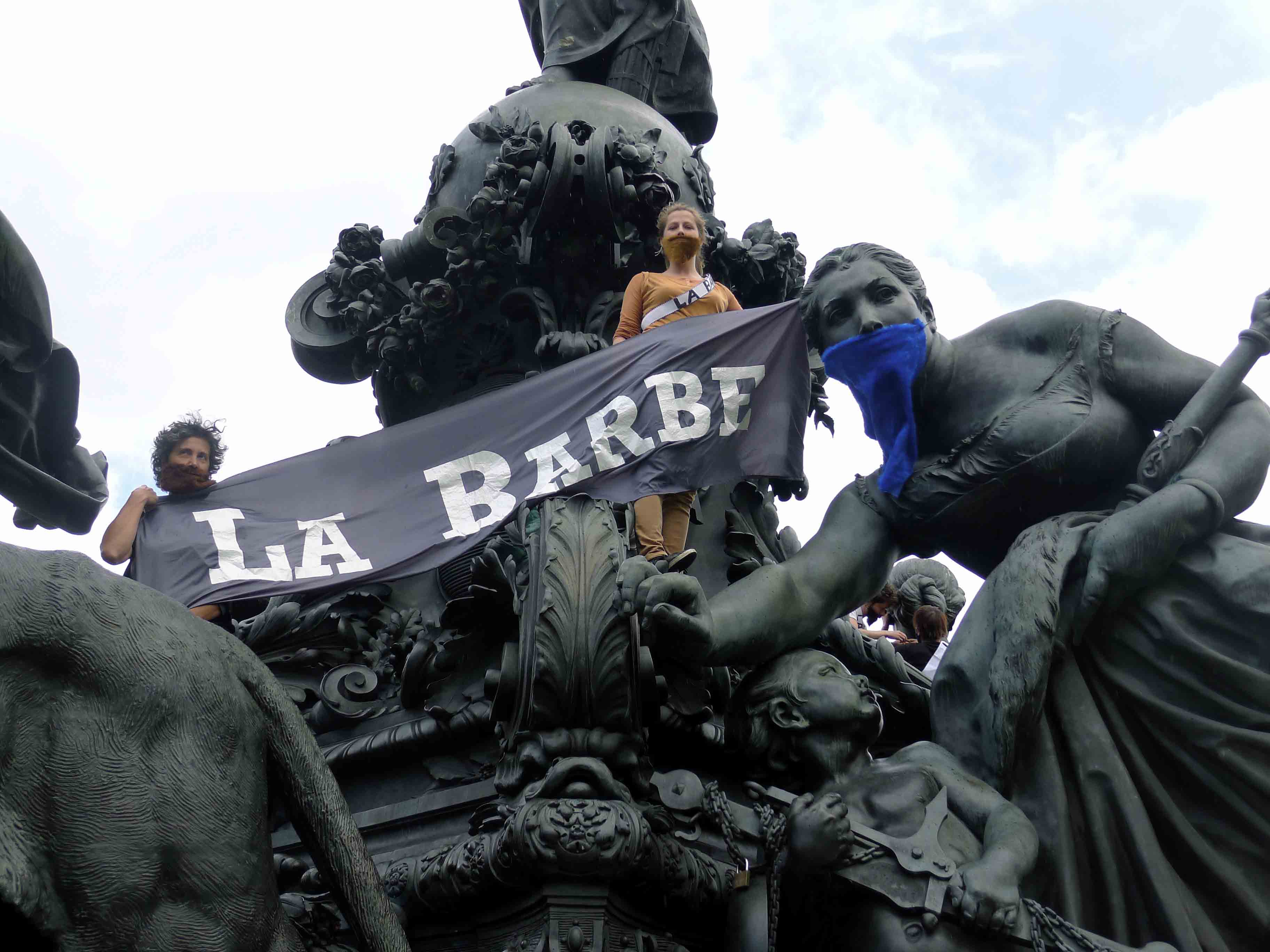
Action of the feminist group La Barbe in Paris

The group emerged during the 2007 French presidential elections. Some advocates of Ségolène Royal were shocked by sexist allusions directed towards her. The group gathered around Marie de Cenival, a former Act UP-Paris activist, gathering women who were not deeply involved in an association or a feminist movement before. In October 2008, "twenty active members, thirty sympathizers" according to Liberation, were members of the group. In March 2010 fifty members were enlisted. The name of the group was a reference to the beard, as symbol of the masculinity, and to the familiar French interjection "La barbe!" meaning "Enough!"

Their first public demonstration took place on February 28, 2008, during a signing session of the Éric Zemmour at Drugstore Publicis in Paris. According to the Le Nouvel Observateur, La Barbe is legally founded as non-profit association on March 8, 2008, for international women's day. The group demonstrated in Paris with Act Up-Paris and the Panthères roses, attaching a beard to one of the statues on the Place de la République.

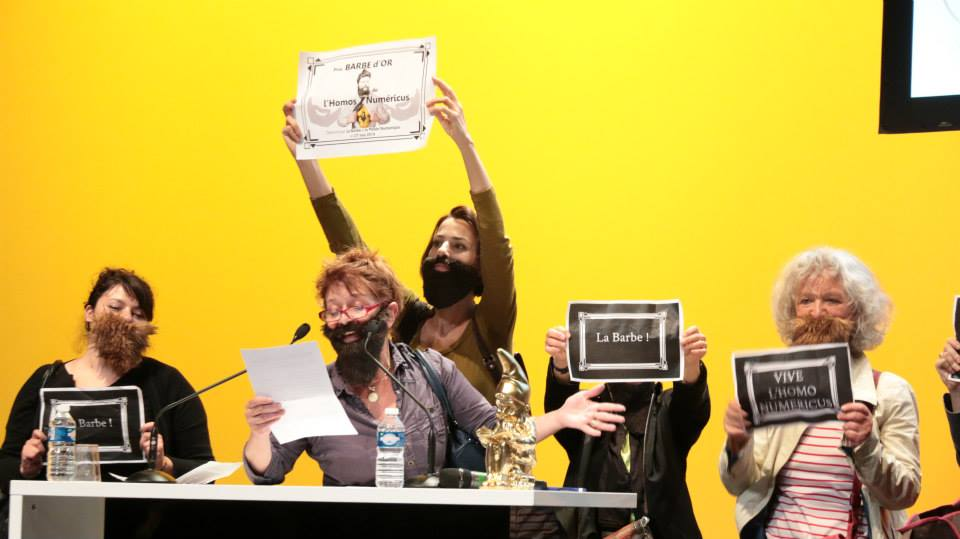
Barbe d'or diploma - La Barbe Toulouse

The group appeared during the 2000s, marked by a new generation of feminists with the creation of the associations Ni putes ni soumises in 2003 and Osez le féminisme in 2009 or Les TumulTueuses in 2010.

In the media, the creation of the magazine Causette in 2009 is a testimony of the renewal of feminism in France. Joy Sorman stated, “these collectives are living proof of the renewal of political activism among the younger generations". With its sense of derision, La Barbe participated in a more general movement of "activist irony" next to other collectives such as L'appel et la pioche, Génération précaire, Jeudi noir, Sauvons les riches et les Clowns à responsabilités sociales.
