= Don McCullin =

British photojournalist (born 1935)

Sir Don McCullin CH CBE
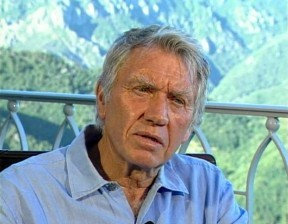
- McCullin on TV Brasil, 2011
- Born: Donald McCullin; 9 October 1935 (age 90); St Pancras, London, England
- Occupation: Photojournalist
- Years active: 1959–present
- Spouses: Christine Dent (m. 1959; div. 1982); Marilyn Bridges (m. 1995; div. 2000); Catherine Fairweather (m. 2002)
- Children: 5

Sir Donald McCullin CH CBE (born 9 October 1935) is a British photojournalist, particularly recognised for his war photography and images of urban strife. His career, which began in 1959, has specialised in examining the underside of society, and his photographs have depicted the unemployed, downtrodden and impoverished.

== Early life ==
McCullin was born in St Pancras, London, and grew up in Finsbury Park, but he was evacuated to a farm in Somerset during the Blitz. He has mild dyslexia but displayed a talent for drawing at the secondary modern school he attended. He won a scholarship to Hammersmith School of Arts and Crafts but, following the death of his father, he left school at the age of 15, without qualifications, for a catering job on the railways. He was then called up for National Service with the Royal Air Force (RAF) in 1953.

== Photojournalism ==
During his National Service, McCullin was posted to the Suez Canal during the 1956 Suez Crisis, and served as a photographer's assistant. He failed the written theory paper to become a photographer in the RAF and spent his service in the darkroom. During this period, McCullin bought his first camera, a Rolleicord, for £30 when stationed in Nairobi. On return to Britain, shortage of funds led to his pawning the camera and his mother used her money to redeem the pledge.

In 1958, he took a photograph of a local London gang posing in a bombed-out building. He was persuaded by his colleagues to take his photograph of The Guvnors, as the gang was known, to The Observer, which published it, setting him on his path as a photographer. Between 1966 and 1984, he worked as an overseas correspondent for the Sunday Times Magazine, recording ecological and man-made catastrophes such as wars, among them Biafra in 1968, and victims of the African AIDS epidemic. His hard-hitting coverage of the Vietnam War and the Northern Ireland conflict is held in particularly high regard.

He also took the photographs of Maryon Park in London used in Michelangelo Antonioni's 1966 film Blowup, In 1968, his Nikon F camera stopped a bullet intended for him. Also in 1968, on 28 July, he was invited to photograph the Beatles, then at the height of their fame and in the midst of recording The White Album. These sessions, made at several London locations, have become known as The Mad Day Out. They contain many well-known images of the band, including the gatefold sleeve picture from the Red and Blue compilations where the Beatles mingled with the crowd seen through railings of a cemetery. The photographs from this day were published in the 2010 book A Day in the Life of the Beatles.

A documentary about McCullin entitled Just One More War, directed by Jana Boková, with ATV as the production company, aired on the ITV network in 1977.

In 1982, the British government refused to grant McCullin a press pass to cover the Falklands War, claiming the boat was full. At the time, he believed it was because the Thatcher government felt his images might be too disturbing politically.

He is the author of a number of books, including The Palestinians (with Jonathan Dimbleby, 1980), Beirut: A City in Crisis (1983) and Don McCullin in Africa (2005). His book Shaped by War (2010) was published to accompany a retrospective exhibition at the Imperial War Museum North, Salford, England, in 2010 and then at the Victoria Art Gallery, Bath, and the Imperial War Museum, London. His most recent publication is Southern Frontiers: A Journey Across the Roman Empire, a poetic and contemplative study of selected Roman and pre-Roman ruins in North Africa and the Middle East.

In 2012, a documentary film of his life, McCullin, directed by David Morris and Jacqui Morris, was released. It was nominated for two BAFTA awards. In later years, McCullin has turned to landscape, still-life works and commissioned portraits. In November 2015, he was named Photo London Master of Photography for 2016.

The BBC Four documentary The Road To Palmyra, filmed in February 2018 and broadcast in May, saw McCullin visit Syria with historian Dan Cruickshank to see the devastation left by the conflict on the UNESCO-listed site of Palmyra. Discussing his trip with the Radio Times, McCullin spoke of his approach to entering war zones: "I have risked my life endless times, and ended up in hospital with all kinds of burns and shell wounds. I have those reptile eyes that see behind and in front of me. I'm constantly trying to stay alive. I'm aware of warfare, of hidden mines."

Despite his reputation as a war photographer, McCullin has said that Alfred Stieglitz was a key influence on his work.

== Personal life ==
Living in Somerset, McCullin is married to travel writer Catherine Fairweather and has five children from his marriages.

== Biopic ==
In November 2020, it was announced Angelina Jolie would be directing a biopic about McCullin, with Tom Hardy in the starring role. The film is being adapted from McCullin's biography Unreasonable Behaviour by Gregory Burke.

== Publications ==
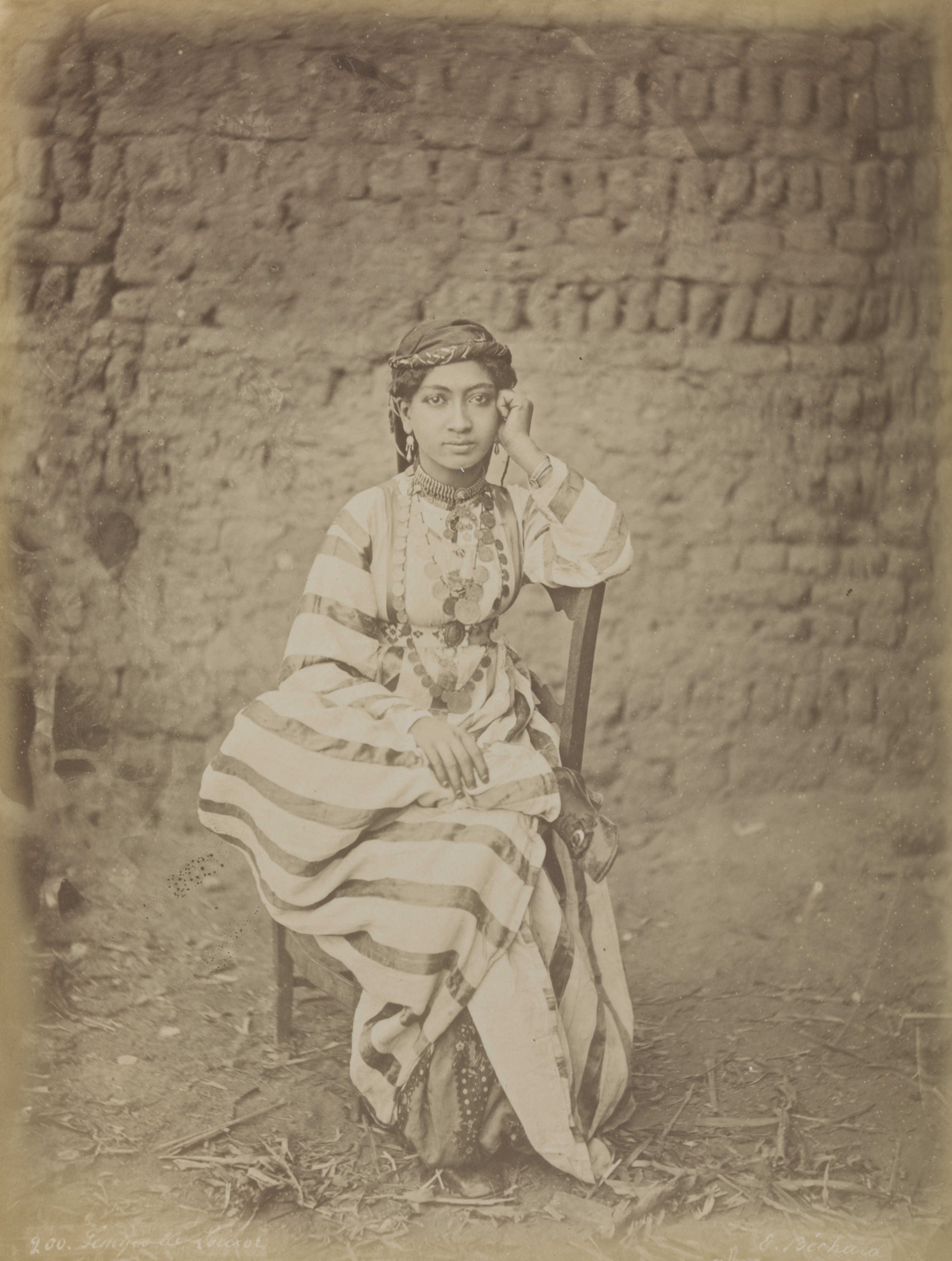
Émile Béchard, Femme du Luxor from McCullin's personal selection of photographs from the National Media Museum's collection, 2009.

- The Destruction Business. Open Gate Books. 1971. ISBN 0-333-13022-7.
- Is Anyone Taking Any Notice?. MIT Press. 1973.
- Anton Wallich-Clifford & Don McCullin (1974). No Fixed Abode. Macmillan Publishers.
- Homecoming. Macmillan. 1979.
- Jonathan Dimbleby & Don McCullin (1980). The Palestinians. Quartet Books. ISBN 0-7043-3322-8.
- Hearts of Darkness: Photographs by Don McCullin. Secker and Warburg. 1980.
- Don McCullin (1983). Beirut: A City in Crisis. New English Library. ISBN 0-450-06037-3.
- Don McCullin (1987). Perspectives. Harrap. ISBN 0-245-54368-6.
- Don McCullin (1989). Open Skies. Introduction by John Fowles. Jonathan Cape. ISBN 0-224-02539-2.
- Norman Lewis & Don McCullin (1993). An Empire of the East: Travels in Indonesia. London: Jonathan Cape. ISBN 0-224-03230-5.
- Don McCullin (1994). Sleeping with Ghosts: A Life's Work in Photography. London: Jonathan Cape. ISBN 0-224-03241-0.
- Don McCullin (1999). India. London: Jonathan Cape. ISBN 0-224-05089-3.
- Cold Heaven. Christian Aid. 2001. ISBN 0-904379-47-7.
- Don McCullin; Lewis Chester (2002). Unreasonable Behaviour: An Autobiography. Vintage Books. ISBN 0-09-943776-7.
- Don McCullin (2003). Don McCullin. London: Jonathan Cape. ISBN 0-224-07118-1.
- Life Interrupted. Christian Aid. 2004. ISBN 0-904379-64-7.
- Don McCullin (2005). Don McCullin in Africa. London: Jonathan Cape. ISBN 0-224-07514-4.
- Don McCullin (2007). Don McCullin in England. London: Jonathan Cape. ISBN 978-0-224-07870-2.
- Don McCullin (2010). Shaped by War. Vintage. ISBN 978-0-224-09026-1.
- Don McCullin (2010) A Day in the Life of the Beatles. London: Jonathan Cape. ISBN 9780224091244. New York: Rizzoli. ISBN 9780847836116.
  - A day in the life of the Beatles: un giorno speciale con John, Paul, George e Ringo. Milan: Rizzoli. ISBN 9788817043793.
  - A day in the life of the Beatles: söndagen den 28 juli 1968. Stockholm: Max Ström. ISBN 9789171262042.
- Don McCullin (2010). Southern Frontiers: A Journey Across the Roman Empire. London: Jonathan Cape. ISBN 978-0-224-08708-7.
- The Landscape. London: Jonathan Cape, 2018. ISBN 978-1787330429.

== Awards ==
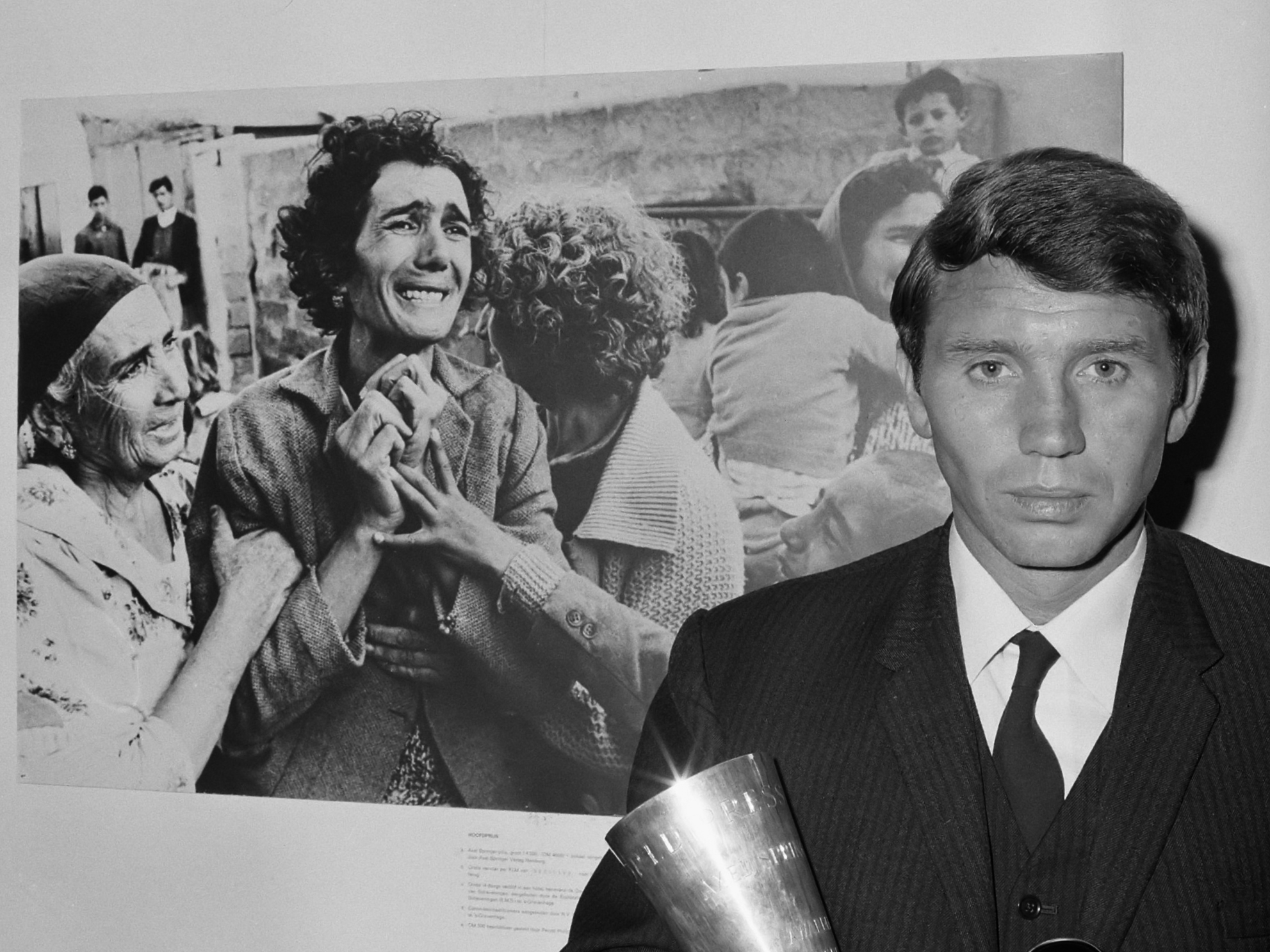
McCullin receiving the World Press Photo Award in 1964

- 1964: World Press Photo of the Year, Amsterdam, for his coverage of the war in Cyprus.
- 1964: Photo Stories, third prize stories, World Press Photo award, Amsterdam.
- 1964: Warsaw Gold Medal.
- 1974: News Picture, first prize stories, World Press Photo award 1973, Amsterdam.
- 1977: Honorary Fellowship of the Royal Photographic Society (HonFRPS).
- 1978: Photo Stories, first prize stories, World Press Photo award 1977, Amsterdam.
- 1984: Spot News, second prize stories, World Press Photo award 1983, Amsterdam.
- 1993: Honorary doctorate from the University of Bradford.
- 1993: Appointed Commander of the Order of the British Empire in the 1993 New Year Honours, the first photojournalist to receive the honour.
- 1994: Honorary degree from the Open University.
- 2003: Royal Photographic Society's Special 150th Anniversary Medal and Honorary Fellowship (HonFRPS) in recognition of a sustained, significant contribution to the art of photography.
- 2006: Cornell Capa Award.
- 2007: Royal Photographic Society's Centenary Medal.
- 2008: Honorary Doctorate of Letters by the University of Gloucestershire in recognition of his lifetime's achievement in photojournalism.
- 2009: Honorary Fellowship of Hereford College of Arts.
- 2011: Honorary Degree (Doctor of Arts) from the University of Bath.
- 2016: Lucie Award in Achievement in Photojournalism category.
- 2017: Appointed Knight Bachelor in the 2017 New Year Honours for services to photography.
- 2017: Honorary Degree (Doctor of Letters) from the University of Exeter.

== Exhibitions ==
- 2010–2012: Shaped by War: Photographs by Don McCullin, Imperial War Museum North, Salford, UK, 2010; Victoria Art Gallery, Bath, UK, 2010; Imperial War Museum, London, 2011–2012 in an updated form. A retrospective with photographs, contact sheets, objects, magazines and personal memorabilia.
- 2013: Retrospective, National Gallery of Canada, Ottawa, Canada.
- 2019: Retrospective, Tate Britain, London, UK.
- 2020–2021: Retrospective, Tate Liverpool (exhibition extended to September 2021 as a result of COVID-19 related closures earlier in the year), Liverpool, UK.
- 2026: Don McCullin: Broken Beauty, the Holburne Museum, Bath, UK, 30 Jan. - 4 May including his 1963 Crowther's Reclamation Yard, Isleworth.

== Collections ==
McCullin's work is held in the following permanent collection:

- Tate, UK: 85 prints as of May 2018
- Victoria and Albert Museum, London: 11 prints
- National Portrait Gallery, London: 18 prints

== Quotes ==
- "I grew up in total ignorance, poverty and bigotry, and this has been a burden for me throughout my life. There is still some poison that won't go away, as much as I try to drive it out."
- "I am a professed atheist, until I find myself in serious circumstances. Then I quickly fall on my knees, in my mind if not literally, and I say : 'Please God, save me from this.'"
- "I have been manipulated, and I have in turn manipulated others, by recording their response to suffering and misery. So there is guilt in every direction: guilt because I don't practise religion, guilt because I was able to walk away, while this man was dying of starvation or being murdered by another man with a gun. And I am tired of guilt, tired of saying to myself: "I didn't kill that man on that photograph, I didn't starve that child." That's why I want to photograph landscapes and flowers. I am sentencing myself to peace."
- "Photography for me is not looking, it's feeling. If you can't feel what you're looking at, then you're never going to get others to feel anything when they look at your pictures."
