= Anna Dovgopol =

Ukrainian LGBT rights activist

Anna Dovgopol (born 1981 or 1982) is a Ukrainian LGBT rights activist and gender studies academic.

== Early life and education ==
Dovgopol became aware of gender roles and expectations from a young age, and argued with her parents so she could wear pants to school rather than dresses or skirts.

Dovgopol studied communications at the University of Southern Maine before earning a bachelor's degree in American Studies and Translation at the American University of Central Asia. She holds a master's degree in gender studies from Central European University.

== Activism ==
In 2005, while attending the American University of Central Asia, Dovgopol helped found an LGBT organization in Bishkek called Labrys. After returning to Ukraine in 2006, she worked for Women's Network, a feminist lesbian NGO, for a year. In summer 2007, she co-founded Insight, an NGO focused on LGBT issues; she worked there for the next two years.

In 2009, Dovgopol worked with the Gay Forum of Ukraine to create the Coalition to Fight Discrimination in Ukraine. The following year, she worked for Amnesty International's Ukraine office. Dovgopol worked with KyivPride in the mid-2010s.

She is currently a co-editor at Gender in Detail, a Ukrainian pop science website. She has worked at the Heinrich Boell Foundation since 2012, where she is their Gender Program Coordinator as of 2024. She also is the Women Lead in Emergencies Coordinator at CARE Ukraine. Following the Russian invasion of Ukraine, Dovgopol has focused some of her research on how the war has impacted gender roles (and vice versa), and the actions Ukrainian women have taken in response to the war.

== Personal life ==
Dovgopol considers herself a feminist and a lesbian. She first realized she was not straight at age 21. After Russia invaded Ukraine in 2022, Dovgopol left the country for one of the Baltic states.
