= The Anxious Asp =

San Francisco lesbian bar (1958–1967)

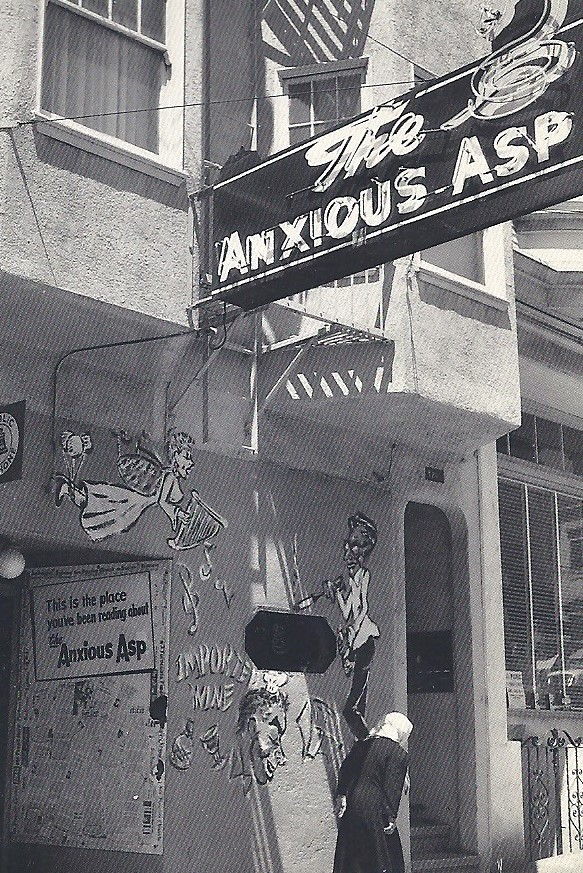
- Entrance to the Anxious Asp (ca. 1965)
- Interactive map of The Anxious Asp

Restaurant information
- Previous owner: Arlene Arbuckle
- Location: 528 Green Street, San Francisco, California, United States
- Coordinates: 37.799812°N 122.407947°W

The Anxious Asp was a lesbian and bohemian bar in operation from 1958 to 1967 at 528 Green Street in the North Beach neighborhood of San Francisco, California, U.S.

== History ==
It began in 1955 as a cabaret with the same name, and was purchased in 1958 by Arlene Arbuckle. Arbuckle also owned the Paper Doll Club, and The Capri. Arbuckle had pivoted The Anxious Asp to a more mixed queer and bohemian crowd (many of which were related to the Beat movement), and they shared staff and clientele with "The Place" and Vesuvio Cafe. The restrooms were wallpapered with pages from the Kinsey Reports, two controversial human sexual behavior books. Notable clients to the former bar included Janis Joplin, and Lew Ellingham.

In total, a collection of San Francisco LGBT venues opened and flourished in the late-1950s, including Tommy's Place/12 Adler Place, Ann's 440, Miss Smith's Tea Room, the Tin Angel, the Copper Lantern, the Front, and Our Club.

Joseph "Bunny" Simon, a Louisiana Creole, was not welcome at the original bar in the 1960s due to race; however, in 1976 Simon opened a new club with the same name, the Anxious Asp on Haight Street.

== See also ==
- List of lesbian bars
