= Jewel Box Lounge =

Historic nightclub in Kansas City, Missouri

- Interactive map of Jewel Box Lounge
- Address: 3223 Troost Avenue; Kansas City, Missouri
- Coordinates: 39.0678°N 94.5713°W
- Owner: John N. Tuccillo
- Type: Nightclub
- Event: Female impersonation

Construction
- Opened: 1948
- Closed: 1982

The Jewel Box Lounge, also known as the Jewel Box, was a nightclub & lounge opened by John Tuccillo in 1948. Located on the historic Troost Avenue in Kansas City, Missouri it was one of the earliest establishments in the area to feature drag queens and impersonators as entertainers. At its peak, the Jewel Box Lounge was one of the largest and best-known drag nightclubs in the United States.

== History ==
The Jewel Box Lounge started as an ordinary nightclub without female impersonation. Then in the late 1950s, several men dressed in drag gave an impromptu singing performance, and their popularity caused the owner of the club to make female impersonation performances the main focus of the club.

The Jewel Box Lounge employed several female impersonators who were nationally renowned entertainers. Skip Arnold was one such female impersonator who performed at the Jewel Box Lounge. He started performing at the Colony Bar nearby, and was then hired in 1959 as the first female impersonator for the Jewel Box Lounge. Another famous performer at the Jewel Box Lounge was Ray Bourbon, who had originally started his drag career at Finocchio's Club in the 1930s. At the Jewel Box Lounge, Bourbon sometimes played the role of Mavis, an elderly cleaning woman, who offered double entendres, and criticisms of the previous performers. In 1964, at the Jewel Box Lounge, Bourbon recorded the drag comedy live album entitled, A Trick Ain't Always a Treat.

In 1966, in the same building, the owner opened a burlesque club called Cat Baleu, and a strip club called Yum-Yum, neither of which employed female impersonators.

From 1965 to 1967, cultural anthropologist Esther Newton did field work observing and studying female impersonation in the United States. She attended over one hundred performances at the Jewel Box Lounge, and interacted extensively with the female impersonators there. Her doctoral dissertation was published and later collected into the 1972 book, Mother Camp: Female Impersonators in America. Mother Camp was the first book-length ethnography focusing on a gay community.

In 1972, the clubs Cat Baleu and Yum-Yum were closed, and the Jewel Box Lounge was moved to 3110 Main Street, but it never regained its former popularity. In 1982, the Jewel Box Lounge was shut down following a large final performance with a packed crowd.

== Demographics ==
Esther Newton listed the Jewel Box Lounge as being in the top four largest and best-known tourist clubs in the United States for female impersonation. The list included Club 82, Club My-O-My, Finocchio's Club, and the Jewel Box Lounge. Newton described a tourist club as one specializing exclusively in female impersonation performances, rather than acting primarily as a gay bar with only occasional performances. Another source describes the clientele as "diverse and accepting", and as, "mostly tourists and local fans".

== Relationship to the Colony Bar ==
The Jewel Box Lounge had a close relationship to the Colony Bar. The two venues were owned by the same people, and were located in the same area, and both featured female impersonators, including some of the same entertainers. The Jewel Box Lounge appealed to straight tourists attending performances, while the Colony Bar primarily appealed to the gay community as a meeting place. Newton described the Colony Bar as being less spacious and less well-equipped than the Jewel Box Lounge.

Esther Newton described the Colony Bar as a "low hustling bar, where street fairies, other gay people, dating couples, and working-class men" rubbed elbows. The Colony Bar was inclusive of gender-variant people who would now be considered transgender, non-binary, or gender non-conforming. The bar held an annual Halloween drag contest each year. A contemporaneous gay travel guide, Bob Damron's Address Book, listed the Colony Bar as being frequented by "raunchy types", often sex workers.

Common locations in Kansas City, Missouri, where cross-dressing occurred included the Colony Bar, the Forest Ballroom, and the Jewel Box Lounge. The Gay and Lesbian Archive of Mid-America (GLAMA), run by the University of Missouri–Kansas City (UMKC), maintains collections of photos from the cross-dressing subculture in Kansas City, Missouri.

== See also ==
- Club 82 (New York City)
- Club My-O-My (New Orleans)
- Finocchio's Club (San Francisco)
- The Beige Room (San Francisco)
