= Tin Angel =

Tin Angel may refer to:

- Tin Angel (San Francisco, California) lesbian jazz nightclub in San Francisco, California
- The Tin Angel, an album by Odetta & Larry
- "Tin Angel", a song by Bob Dylan from the album Tempest
- "Tin Angel", a song by Joni Mitchell from the album Clouds
- Tin Angel Records, a British record label
