= Carole Doyle Peel =

Carole Doyle Peel (1934 in Los Angeles, CA – 2016 in Berkeley, CA) was an American visual artist, best known for her portraits and still life drawings in graphite, gouache, and watercolor. The work combines appreciation for classical and Old Master painting and drawing with contemporary subjects. Peel was Professor Emerita at California College of the Arts where she taught for forty six years.

== Early life and education ==
Peel (née Carole Lee Doyle) was born in 1934 in Los Angeles, California. She grew up in south central Los Angeles during the Depression, where she had broad access to educational enrichment. Peel cites her deepest influences as being “...from my mother and Rembrandt and, at fourteen, Käthe Kollwitz. I fell in love with Rembrandt in the Los Angeles County Museum and at seven or eight wanted to be just like him.” She attended Dorsey High School in Los Angeles, where she was inspired with a passion for draftsmanship and a desire to teach by an art teacher, who recognized her talent and encouraged her to study. Beginning at age 16, Peel attended summer sessions at Chouinard Art Institute, University of California Los Angeles, Manual Arts, and Los Angeles County Museum of Art. She received her B.S. Degree from University of Utah in 1958, and went on to study at École supérieure des Beaux-Arts and University of Geneva, Switzerland. She received her M.A. in Art from the University of California Berkeley in 1964 and was particularly influenced by Professors Erle Loran (1905–1999) and Robert Hartman (1926–2015).

== Teaching career ==
From 1964 to 1966 Peel taught at the Department of Art at the University of California, Berkeley, where she was recipient of the Anne Bremer Award. In 1968 she was appointed Associate Professor, California College of the Arts (CCA), where she taught until 2014. According to her colleague and former Painting Department Chair Kim Anno: “Carole Peel brought serious dedication to teaching the practice of portraiture at California College of the Arts. Her approach was through refined hands-on skills and the telling of travel stories. Peel travelled to Europe extensively and gathered stories of the European masters, sharing these vividly with students. Up until her retirement at 80, her classes were filled to capacity with young fascinated minds.”

== Work ==
During Peel's career she has created work in diverse media including drawings in graphite and colored pencil, watercolor and gouache, as well as mixed media collages and paintings. Peel's mastery of portraiture and still life has led her to sometimes blur boundaries between the two. In some cases, such as Portrait of Bellini, 1989, Morandi and Chardin, 1990, and Group Portrait (Portrait of Goblets), 1993, she names still life drawings as portraits. Many of her still life drawings are tributes to Old Master painters, such as Giovanni Bellini, Duccio, Pisanello, Jean Clouet, Diego Velázquez, and Pierre-Paul Prud'hon, among others. Since 1980, Peel made annual trips to London and Paris, where she drew in museums, most often at the British Museum. Her oeuvre also includes numerous commissioned and self-portraits. “Her delicate work is personal, becoming postmodern in the later years. She takes apart her favorite masterworks and intervenes with small hermetic gestures of still life, integrating social commentary with everyday life. For decades, Peel drew portraits of the intellectuals and their families around her, creating a visual archive of the history of the Bay Area,” said Kim Anno.

Peel's work has been featured in numerous group exhibitions at colleges including Lone Mountain College, Scripps College, St. Mary's College, and San Jose State University, as well as at Los Angeles Institute of Contemporary Art (LAICA), San Francisco Center for the Book, California Crafts Museum, and Berkeley Art Center. A comprehensive monograph, by Helen Frierson, Carole Doyle Peel: The Delight of Drawing, was published in 2016. Peel's archive is in the Smithsonian American Art Museum/ National Portrait Gallery Library
