= The Tin Angel =

Studio album by Odetta & Larry
- Released: September 1954
- Recorded: 1953–54, Tin Angel bar, San Francisco
- Genre: Blues, country blues, folk
- Label: LP: Fantasy 3252/3345; Vocalion LAE 541 (UK); CD: Original Blues Classics, OBCCD-565-2

Odetta chronology
The Tin Angel (1954)	Odetta Sings Ballads and Blues (1956)

Alternative cover
- "Odetta And Larry", different edition (Fantasy 8345)

The Tin Angel is Odetta & Larry's only album, and the first recording by Odetta, originally released in September 1954 on Fantasy Records.

== Background ==
- The album is a collection of recordings of Odetta and Larry Mohr from 1953–54; it was partially recorded live at San Francisco's Tin Angel nightclub. The 1993 CD re-release contained six extra tracks, recorded in March 1954.
- Like much of Odetta's early work, The Tin Angel combines traditional songs (e.g. spirituals) with blues covers. It is often only credited as an Odetta solo album, perhaps because she went on to have the more successful career.

== Track listing ==
- Marked [*] are 1993 CD bonus tracks.
  All songs traditional unless stated.
1. "John Henry" – 3:09
2. "Old Cotton Fields at Home" (Ledbetter) – 3:59
3. "The Frozen Logger" (Haglund, Stevens) – 2:53
4. "Run, Come See Jerusalem" (Blind Blake) – 2:06
5. "Old Blue" – 2:36
6. "Water Boy" – 3:40
7. "Santy Anno" – 2:18
8. "I Was Born About 10,000 Years Ago"/"The Biggest Thing" (Woody Guthrie) – 2:47
9. "Riding in My Car (Car Song)" (Woody Guthrie) – 1:27
10. "No More Cane on the Brazos" – 2:19
11. "Payday at Coal Creek" – 3:02
12. "'Buked and Scorned" – 2:46
13. "Rock Island Line" (Leadbetter) – 1:47
14. "Another Man Done Gone" [*] (Hall, Lomax, Lomax, Tartt) – 3:05
15. "Children Go Where I Send Thee" [*] – 2:35
16. "I Know Where I'm Going" [*] – 2:10
17. "He's Got the Whole World in His Hands" [*] – 1:55
18. "Timber" [*] – 3:49
19. "Wade in the Water" [*] – 1:57

== Album ==
- The original vinyl LP was transparent red in color.
