= Columbus Avenue (San Francisco) =

Street in San Francisco, California

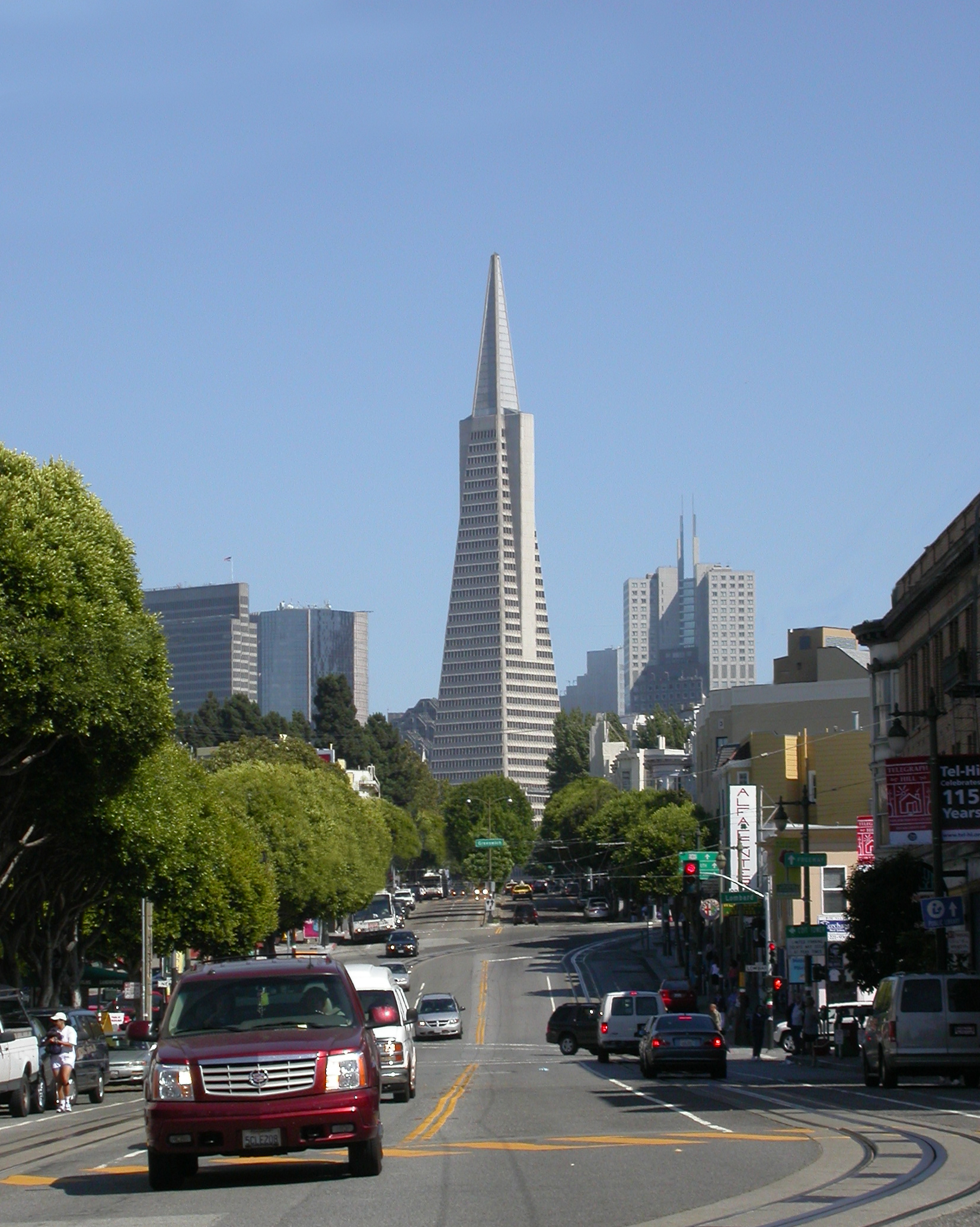
- The Transamerica Pyramid rising from the foot of Columbus Avenue
- Maintained by: San Francisco DPW
- Location: San Francisco
- Coordinates: 37.80107°N 122.41137°W
- Southeast end: Washington and Montgomery Streets
- Northwest end: Beach Street

Columbus Avenue is one of the major streets of San Francisco that runs diagonally through the North Beach and Chinatown areas of San Francisco, California, from Washington and Montgomery Streets by the Transamerica Pyramid to Beach Street near Fisherman's Wharf. This street is home to several notable venues, such as Jack Kerouac Alley, named for poet Jack Kerouac, City Lights Bookstore, Vesuvio Cafe, Specs' Twelve Adler Museum Cafe (in an alley off Columbus), and Bimbo's 365 Club.

The street's original name was Montgomery Avenue, and was built in the 1870s. It was renamed Columbus Avenue in 1909.
