= Rock Island Line (song) =

Traditional song

"The Rock Island Line"

Song by Cummins State Farm inmates
- Released: 1930s
- Recorded: October 1934
- Venue: Cummins State Farm, Lincoln County, Arkansas
- Genre: American folk music
- Length: 1:48
- Label: Archive of Folk Culture (no. AFS 248)
- Songwriter: see text
- Producer: John A. Lomax

"Rock Island Line" (Roud 15211) is an American folk song about the railroad of the same name. The song was originally sung as a spiritual by slaves on the plantations of the Mississippi River Valley, and was first transcribed as a folk song in 1929.

The first recording was made by John Lomax, who was traveling among the prisons of the American South to record the spirituals dating from the antebellum South before they were lost forever. Lomax met a remarkable tenor named Huddie Ledbetter (who later performed under the name Lead Belly) at a prison in Louisiana in 1933 and helped secure Ledbetter’s release from prison. Lomax then traveled with Ledbetter to other prisons, recording the inmates of the Arkansas Cummins State Farm prison in 1934. This recording is sometimes identified as "Kelly Pace and Prisoners". Lead Belly first recorded his own, narrative version of the song in 1937, and numerous top musicians covered that version of the song, which was ostensibly about a train to New Orleans.

The beginning of the most popular (Lead Belly) version of the song tells the story of a train operator who smuggles pig iron through a toll gate by claiming all he had on board was livestock. Neither the 1929 transcription nor the 1934 Kelly Pace recording contained that narrative. The song's chorus includes:

The Rock Island Line is a mighty good road
The Rock Island Line is the road to ride
The Rock Island Line is a mighty good road
If you want to ride you gotta ride it like you find it
Get your ticket at the station for the Rock Island Line

Many artists subsequently recorded it, often changing the verses and adjusting the lyrics.

== History ==
Clarence Wilson, a member of the Rock Island Colored Booster Quartet made the earliest known written transcription of "Rock Island Line" in 1929. The singing group was made up of employees of the Chicago, Rock Island and Pacific Railroad at the Biddle Shops freight yard in Little Rock, Arkansas. The lyrics to this version are largely different from the version that later became famous, as explained below.

The first audio recording of the song was made by folklorist and musicologist John A. Lomax at the Tucker, Arkansas prison farm on September 29, 1934 (sometimes identified as "Kelly Pace and Prisoners"). Lead Belly accompanied Lomax to the prison. Lomax had discovered Lead Belly in a prison in Louisiana and helped win his release, but the relationship between them was trying. John Lomax's son, Alan Lomax, helped Lead Belly become established as a musician after Lead Belly made his recording of a longer, narrative version of the song in 1937, which is the version that was most often covered by other musicians. Lead Belly's version retains some lyrical features of the 1929 version, but also features the narrative. Lomax recorded a version similar to the 1929 version in October 1934 at Cummins State Farm prison in Lincoln County, Arkansas, performed by a group of singers led by Kelly Pace, who recorded the inmates of the Arkansas Cummins State Farm prison in 1934.

The Penguin Book Of American Folk Songs, compiled and with notes by Alan Lomax, published in 1964, includes "Rock Island Line" with the following footnote, however, the "facts" conflict with those from other sources, and are believed to be inaccurate- For example, Kelly Pace could not have composed the song: 1)The 1934 recording was made to preserve the spirituals of the antebellum South before they were lost, and which Clarence Wilson had already transcribed, and which the Colored Booster Club had been singing five years earlier in 1929. Further, 2) Lead Belly had also been a convict in a southern prison in Louisiana which is believed to have been closer to where the song has been sung as a spiritual prior to the Civil War, and thus Lead Belly is likely to have heard the song first in that or other contexts in Louisiana. 3) Donegan credited the Kelly Pace recording, however, he sang the Lead Belly version, which is what he made popular in England.

John A. Lomax recorded this song at the Cummins State Prison farm, Gould, Arkansas, in 1934 from its convict composer, Kelly Pace. The Negro singer, Lead Belly, heard it, rearranged it in his own style, and made commercial phonograph recordings of it in the 1940s. One of these recordings was studied and imitated phrase by phrase, by a young English singer of American folk songs [referring to Lonnie Donegan], who subsequently recorded it for an English company. The record sold in the hundreds of thousands in the U.S. and England, and this Arkansas Negro convict song, as adapted by Lead Belly, was published as a personal copyright, words and music, by someone whose contact with the Rock Island Line was entirely through the grooves of a phonograph record.

According to Harry Lewman Music,

Lead Belly and John and Alan Lomax supposedly first heard it from [a] prison work gang during their travels in 1934/35. It was sung a cappella. Huddie [Lead Belly] sang and performed this song, finally settling on a format where he portrayed, in song, a train engineer asking the depot agent to let his train start out on the main line.

Lonnie Donegan's recording, released as a single in late 1955, signaled the start of the UK skiffle craze. This recording featured Donegan, Chris Barber on double bass and Beryl Bryden on washboard. The Acoustic Music organization makes this comment about Donegan's version. "It flew up the English charts. Donegan had synthesized American Southern Blues with simple acoustic instruments: acoustic guitar, washtub bass and washboard rhythm. The new style was called 'Skiffle' .... and referred to music from people with little money for instruments. The new style captivated an entire generation of post-war youth in England."

Pete Seeger recorded a version a cappella while he was chopping wood, to demonstrate its origins.

== Cover versions ==
"Rock Island Line" has been recorded by:

=== 1930s–1940s ===
- Prison inmates in Arkansas – Recorded by John Lomax in Arkansas twice in 1934. The October 1934 recording, by Kelly Pace and a group of convicts, was released on the compilation album A Treasury of Library of Congress Field Recordings (released 1997)
- Lead Belly – Recorded in Washington, D.C., on June 22, 1937, the first of many recordings he made during his career, the last being live at the University of Texas at Austin on June 15, 1949.
  "Rock Island Line" appears on the Lead Belly compilation Rock Island Line: Original 1935-1943 Recordings (released 2003), among many others.
- Arkansas prisoners – Also recorded by John Lomax in 1939. This performance is included with his 1939 Southern States Recording Trip.

=== 1950s ===
- George Melly (single 1951) – Recorded for the small British jazz label Tempo (which was subsequently acquired by Decca) under the name "The George Melly Trio", and featuring Johnny Parker on piano and Norman Dodsworth on drums (both members of Mick Mulligan's Magnolia Jazz Band with whom Melly was the singer).
- Odetta as part of the duo Odetta and Larry The Tin Angel 1954
- Lonnie Donegan (single 1955) – In July 1954 Donegan recorded this fast-tempo version of "Rock Island Line", with Chris Barber's Jazz Band. It was the first debut record to be certified gold in the UK, where it helped trigger the skiffle craze. The single reached the top ten in the US, peaking at number eight. This record is quoted by various later famous musicians as a catalyst for their musical development. Donegan embellished Lead Belly's earlier lyrics with an account of how the locomotive engineer fooled a toll-collector by misrepresenting his load of pig-iron as livestock, which was not chargeable, but this is based on his misunderstanding of the railroad phrase “in the hole” (meaning in the siding); the original meaning was merely that the engineer avoided a wait in the siding because trains carrying livestock were given priority.
- Woody Guthrie and Sonny Terry (1955)
- Bobby Darin (single 1956) – Bobby Darin's debut single was a 1956 recording of "Rock Island Line", with "rhythm accompaniment directed by Jack Pleis" for Decca Records.
- Don Cornell (single 1956) – Recorded for Coral Records, an early American cover version following the success of Lonnie Donegan's record in the US charts.
- Stan Freberg (single 1956) – In his typical manner, Freberg parodied Lonnie Donegan's "Rock Island Line", following the latter's American chart success. Issued on Capitol, it was the B-side to Freberg's parody of Elvis Presley's "Heartbreak Hotel".
- Merrill Moore with Cliffie Stone's Orchestra – single (April 1956)
- The Weavers – The Weavers' Greatest Hits (1957)
- Johnny Cash – Johnny Cash with His Hot and Blue Guitar (1957) and also issued as Sun Records EP112 as a single - Cash adds two verses to the song, one about a train coming down the track and the second about an engineer indicating two beverages he wants to try before he dies: "a hot cup of coffee and a cold glass of tea."
- Milt Okun – America's Best Loved Folk Songs, Baton BL1203 (1957)
- Johnny Horton – 1956–1960, recorded in 1957, released posthumously
- Snooks Eaglin – New Orleans Street Singer, SFW CD 40165 (1959)
- The Tarriers – The Tarriers (1957)
- Gateway Singers (1957)

=== 1960s ===
- The Brothers Four – The Brothers Four Song Book, CS8497 (1961)
- Ramblin' Jack Elliot – Young Brigham (1968)
- Engelbert Humperdinck - performed on S07E03 of The Hollywood Palace (1969)

=== 1970s ===
- Harry Belafonte – On Belafonte, later released on the CDs All Time Greatest Hits Vol. 3 and 36 All-Time Greatest Hits.
- Sonny Terry and Brownie McGhee – Blues Masters (1991)
- Whiskey Howl – A cappella version by the Toronto blues band on their 1972 eponymous album
- John Lennon – Acoustic and unreleased version found on the bootleg, The Lost Lennon Tapes
- George Harrison and Paul Simon – Acoustic version performed during rehearsal for November 20, 1976 episode of Saturday Night Live
- Graham Bonnet – On the album Graham Bonnet (1977)

=== 1980s ===
- The Knitters – Poor Little Critter on the Road (1985)
- The Washington Squares – The Washington Squares (1987)
- Mano Negra – Patchanka (1988)
- Little Richard & Fishbone – Folkways: A Vision Shared—A Tribute to Woody Guthrie and Leadbelly (1988)
- Boxcar Willie (1983)

=== 1990s ===
- Devil in a Woodpile (with Jane Baxter Miller) (single 1999) – On the album Poor Little Knitter on the Road - A Tribute to the Knitters

=== 2000s ===
- Odetta – Looking for a Home (2001)
- Dan Zanes and Friends – Family Dance (2001)
- Long John Baldry – Remembering Leadbelly (2001)
- Chris Thomas King – Johnny's Blues: A Tribute to Johnny Cash (2003)
- Eleven Hundred Springs – Bandwagon (2004)
- The Reverend Peyton's Big Damn Band – The Gospel Album (2007)

=== 2010s ===
- Ringo Starr – Ringo 2012 (2012)
- Billy Bragg and Joe Henry - Shine a Light: Field Recordings from the Great American Railroad (2016)
- Eric Church (2017) 61 Days in Church (2017)
