= The Frozen Logger =

Song
- Written: 1928
- Published: 1949
- Genre: American folk
- Songwriter(s): James Stevens

"The Frozen Logger" (Roud 5470) is an American folk song, written by James Stevens. It is a tall tale song which makes reference to a logger being identifiable by the habit of stirring coffee with his thumb.

== Renditions ==
The song has been recorded and/or performed by several musicians:

- The Weavers 1951
- Odetta & Larry The Tin Angel 1954
- Cisco Houston Hard Travellin 1954
- Homer and Jethro "Barefoot Ballads" 1957
- Jimmie Rodgers 1960
- Odetta At the Town Hall 1963
- Rolf Harris Man With The Microphone 1966
- Alex Campbell Way Out west 1967
- Johnny Cash "Country & Western Classics" 1982
- The Wakami Wailers River Through the Pines 1999
- Oscar Brand

The first verse or the first two verses were sometimes played as a snippet during instrument tuning breaks by the Grateful Dead in concert, mainly in 1970. It was usually sung by Bob Weir and Phil Lesh.

== Cinema ==
An animated version is available as The Frozen Logger 1963 directed by Gene Deitch

== Published ==
- Bunk Shanty Ballads and Tales, James Stevens, Oregon Historical Quarterly, volume 50, number 4. December 1949.
- Rise Up Singing 1988 page 137
- Lyrics at Folk Song Collector

== Parody ==
The Frozen Jogger.
