= Specs' Twelve Adler Museum Cafe =

Historic bar in San Francisco

Coordinates: 37.79766°N 122.40599°W

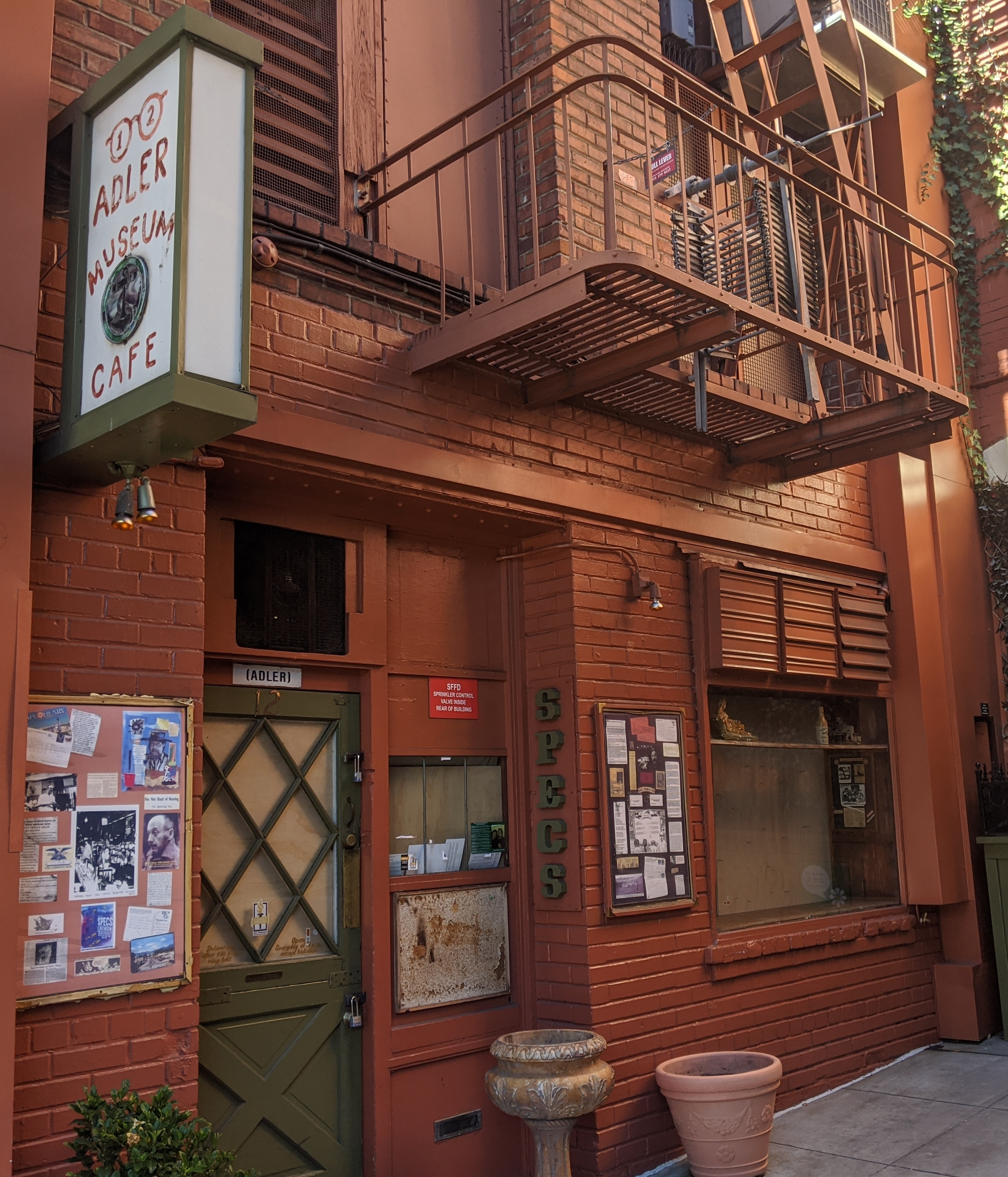
The outside of the bar in 2020

Specs' Twelve Adler Museum Cafe (also known as "Specs") is a historic bar, located in the North Beach district of San Francisco. The bar is known to be "home to a menagerie of misfits, from strippers and poets to longshoremen and merchant marines." Notable patrons have included Thelonious Monk, Jack Hirschman, Warren Hinckle, and Herb Caen.

== Richard "Specs" Simmons ==
The bar founder, Richard "Specs" Simmons, was born in 1928 in the Roxbury neighborhood of Boston, Massachusetts. He was raised by a working-class Jewish family. His father and uncle worked as sheet metal workers, and they occasionally worked as bookies. As a youth, Simmons worked in the family business.

In 1948, he decided to leave Boston due to his left-wing politics. He became a merchant marine and spent time in Europe. He first arrived in San Francisco as a merchant marine. However, he relocated to Los Angeles, California for one year, where he did metalwork. In 1951, he returned to San Francisco. Initially, he lived in the Western Addition neighborhood, and then moved to North Beach in a flat above City Lights Bookstore. He worked as a bartender at Vesuvio Cafe for one year, where he met his wife, Sonia Marantz. Like Simmons, she was a working-class Jew, originally from the East Coast. Simmons proceeded to work in metalwork for 15 years. Simmons was nicknamed "Specs" when he worked in construction, due to the eyeglasses that he wore.

== Bar history ==
In 1968, Simmons and his wife, Sonia, opened the bar at 12 Adler Place (now called William Saroyan Place), an alley off Columbus Avenue, in North Beach. It is believed that Simmons opened the bar with royalties from the "MTA" song, performed by The Kingston Trio. This occurred because, in 1955, Simmons had met Will Holt while working as a waiter at the Purple Onion nightclub in New York City. Simmons introduced Holt to the "MTA" song, which he had learned as a low-level volunteer for the Walter A. O'Brien mayoral candidacy in Boston. The song had been a core part of the O'Brien campaign. Holt went on to perform and record the song in 1957, and the Kingston Trio then released a chart-topping version of the song in 1959.

When Simmons took over the 12 Adler location, it already had a storied past. The space, originally built in 1850, had served as a Chinese Joss House before being destroyed in the 1906 earthquake and fires. It was then rebuilt in 1911, and it served as a speakeasy (1919–33) during prohibition. In 1937, the space became a social/political club for Alaska fishermen, followed by a serviceman's bar (1941–45). After the war, it became bohemian hangout (1945–48). In the early 1950s, the space was a lesbian bar called Tommy's Place/12 Adler Place, where an infamous 1954 police raid took place. Afterward, the location became the nightclub "Frank's," owned by Frank Guidera, which featured Middle Eastern music, jazz music, and bellydancers. However, in 1965, North Beach nightlife changed when San Francisco legalized topless dancing and figures such as Carol Doda danced at the Condor Club. Simmons explained, "By that time North Beach turned into this big topless thing. There were only a few spots for locals to hang out. I was sick of swinging a hammer and I figured, maybe I’d find a joint."

Specs' was opened as a working-class union bar, and Simmons cited the William Saroyan play The Time of Your Life as an inspiration for the bar. Simmons was a vocal defender of labor unions. For this reason, the bartenders at Specs' were unionized, as they remain today. They also receive benefits and retirement. The bartenders can refuse to make any drink that they don't want to make, and they can refuse service to anyone for any reason. The bartenders are currently members of Local 2, a union for hospitality workers in San Francisco.

Specs' served as the meeting grounds for various people, including sailors, poets, artists, musicians, strippers, union organizers, activists, and neighborhood locals. The bar was located near the Port of San Francisco, thereby attracting dock workers and sailors, until dock work largely moved to the East Bay. A strip club was located above the bar, and strippers used the bar bathrooms through a staircase that connected the two businesses. The staff of Processed World, an anarchist magazine, regularly met at the bar between 1982 and 1984.

On Wednesday nights, the bar was often a meeting place for socialist writers and poets. The Revolutionary Poets Brigade, a local group of radical and socialist poets, conducted meetings at the bar on Wednesday nights. The Brigade includes Jack Hirschman, who has been a longtime, regular patron of the bar. The editor of Left Curve, Csaba Polony, also patronized the bar on Wednesday nights. Many customers have had FBI files on them, including Simmons, who was involved in left-wing politics in the 1940s and 1950s.

Over the years, Specs' became well known for its decor, clientele, and unique characteristics. It is decorated with idiosyncratic items, some of which came from sailors and dockworkers. Items include taxidermy, Inuit carvings, propaganda posters, letters and postcards sent from around the world, a petrified walrus penis bone, and an old piano in the back. Customers can order one food item: edam cheese, which is cut from a huge wheel, with saltine crackers. As described in Hoodline:

"Specs' refusal to run his business according to anyone else's playbook was palpable in almost every decision he made. The bar itself almost defies description: a low-ceilinged, dark, and narrow room lined with curio cabinets, inside each of which are trophies, trinkets, artwork, idiosyncratic miscellany, totems, and plenty of socialist and union propaganda."

For decades, Specs' hosted bi-annual "Ancient Rome" parties, which occurred during April and August. At these events, people were invited to a free feast, which included shucked oysters and clams. The feast was paid for by Simmons and also included community contributions. The parties could sometimes extend for 12 hours. As one longtime regular recounted,

"The line before the door opened for the party could be dozens deep. And everyone’s welcome. Even the people who’ve been 86ed. It was like Specs’ holy days of forgiveness, renewal, and plenty.”

In 2016, Specs' was one of nine businesses to be named a "legacy" business in San Francisco. This enabled the bar to begin having ten-year leases, rather than the 5-year lease that they had continually renewed since the bar's opening.

Simmons continued to occupy his North Beach flat into his old age. In October 2016, Simmons died at 84 years old, after battling Parkinson's disease. The bar remains open. Simmons' daughter, Elly Simmons, is co-owner of the bar.

During the COVID-19 pandemic, the bar closed, like many other bars in the area. It launched a GoFundMe campaign to help pay rent, utilities, taxes, insurance, and union dues, and it received a PPP loan.
