= James Stevens (writer) =

- Born: 1892; Albia, Iowa
- Died: 1971 (aged 78–79)
- Known for: Paul Bunyan, The Frozen Logger,

James Stevens (1892 – December 31, 1971) was an American writer and composer. Born in Albia, Iowa, he lived in Idaho from a young age, and based much of his later novel Big Jim Turner (1948) on his childhood spent in Pacific Northwest logging camps. After fighting in World War I, he came back to work in the woods and sawmills of Oregon.

Stevens "...characterized himself as 'a hobo laborer with wishful literary yearning,' and became self-educated at public libraries, which he called 'the poor man's universities.'"

He later traveled through the West and Midwest, and lived in Detroit, Portland, and Seattle. He researched logging history and wrote about the logging industry and about conservation. In the 1940s, as the public relations director for the Western Lumberman's Association, he promoted the "Keep Washington Green" campaign against forest fires.

Among his literary works were Paul Bunyan (1925), Brawny Man (1926), Mattock (1927), Homer in the Sagebrush (1928), The Saginaw Paul Bunyan (1932), Paul Bunyan Bears (1947), and Tree Treasure (1950). He collaborated with H. L. Davis.

His song "The Frozen Logger" was recorded by The Weavers on Goodnight Irene (1951), Odetta/Odetta & Larry on The Tin Angel (1954), Cisco Houston on Hard Travelin' (1954), Walt Robertson on American Northwest Ballads (1955), Jimmie Rodgers on At Home with Jimmie Rodgers: An Evening of Folk Songs (1960), and by many others, including Oscar Brand and Johnny Cash. The song was sung (although never recorded) by Bob Weir of The Grateful Dead during some of their concerts.

== Archives ==
- James Stevens papers. 1883–1966. 18.06 cubic feet. At the University of Washington Libraries Special Collections.
