= Paper Doll Club =

Queer bar in San Francisco, California (1949–1961)

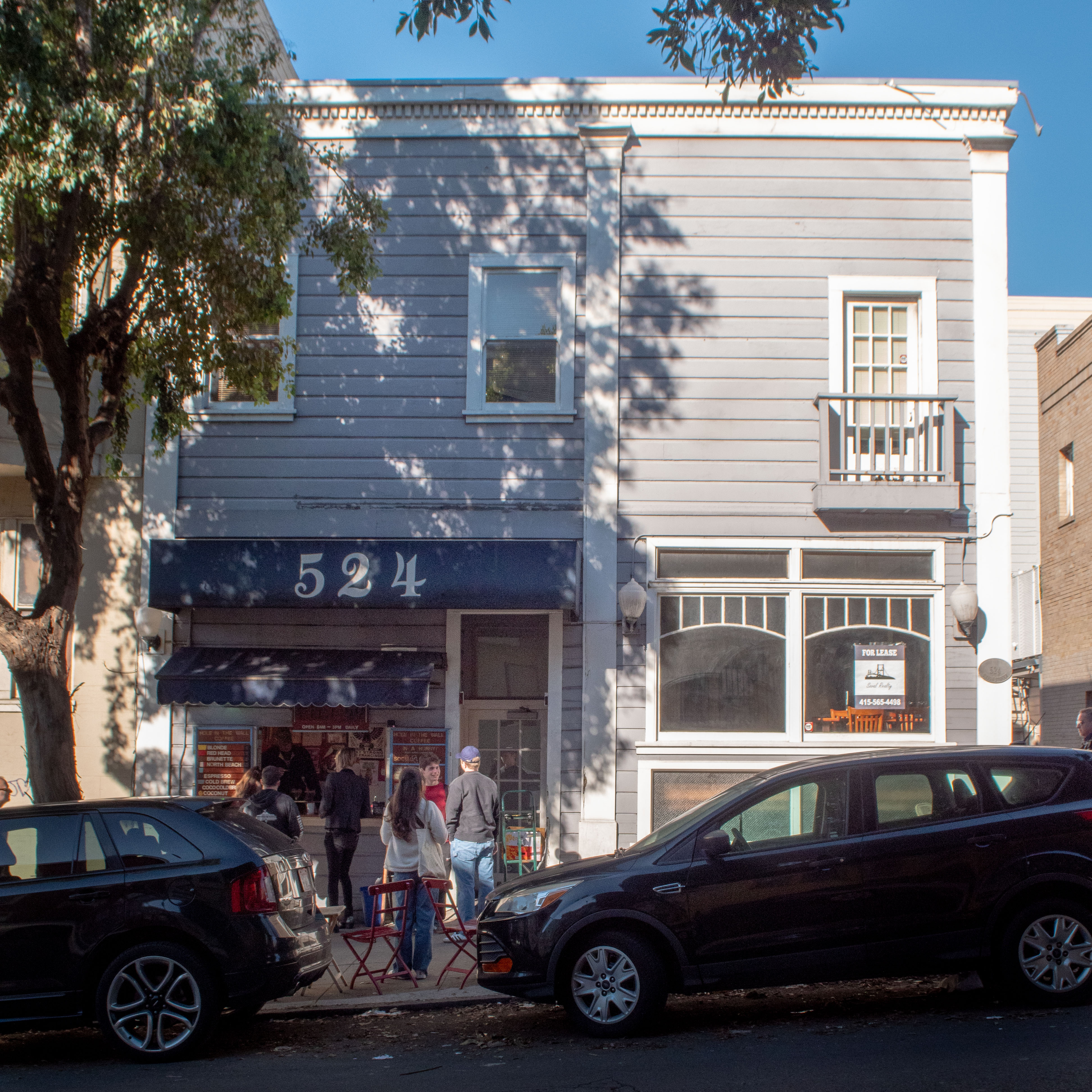
- Paper Doll Club location in 2025
- Location: 524 Union Street, San Francisco, California, U.S.
- Coordinates: 37.800753°N 122.408143°W
- Founded: 1949–1961
- Owner: Tom Arbulich (1949–1954), Dante Benedetti (1954–1961)

San Francisco Designated Landmark
- Designated: June 25, 2019
- Reference no.: 287

The Paper Doll Club, also known as Paper Doll, was an LGBTQ bar and supper club in operation from 1949 to 1961, and located at the corner of Cadell Place and Union Street (now 524 Union Street) in the North Beach neighborhood in San Francisco, California. It is believed to be one of the earliest lesbian bars in the city.

The former building has been a designated San Francisco landmark since 2019.

== History ==
Tom Arbulich owned the bar from 1949 to 1956; Arbulich had helped open the business with Mona Sargent, the owner of Mona's 440 Club. It was found as an upscale gathering spot, serving the neighborhood queer community. It started as a bar, and later turned into a bar and supper club. Prior to 1955, serving alcohol to 'known homosexuals' was illegal, and homosexual acts were banned.

The film noir, The Sniper (1952) was partially filmed inside the Paper Doll Club, though moviegoers who were not familiar with the club did not learn from the dialogue that regular customers were queer. From 1956 to 1961, the club was owned by Dante Benedetti, a North Beach restaurateur and baseball coach. Patrons and performers of the bar included Carmen McRae, Ann Weldon, and Lillian Faderman.

In total, a collection of San Francisco LGBT venues opened and flourished in the early 1950s, including the Paper Doll, The Beige Room, Tommy's Place/12 Adler Place, Miss Smith’s Tea Room, Tin Angel, Dolan's, and Gordon's. In 1961, Benedetti sold the business to Don Farber, a professional baseball player who renamed it Cadell Place. Later the space became the "Manhattan Towers", a lesbian bar owned by Katherine James.

It was featured in the Kim Anno art exhibition "Lost and Found: A Museum of Lesbian Memory, Part 1" (2000) shown at "The Gay, Lesbian, Bisexual and Transgender Historical Society of Northern California," and at the San Francisco Public Library.

== See also ==
- List of lesbian bars
- List of San Francisco Designated Landmarks
