= Club My-O-My =

Historic nightclub in New Orleans, Louisiana, US

Wonder Bar
- Interactive map of Wonder Bar
- Address: 125 Decatur Street; New Orleans, Louisiana
- Coordinates: 29.9526°N 90.0668°W
- Owner: Emile Morlet
- Type: Nightclub
- Event: Female impersonation

Construction
- Opened: 1933
- Closed: 1936

Club My-O-My
- Interactive map of Club My-O-My
- Former names: Wonder Club
- Address: 1744 Lake Avenue; Metairie, Louisiana
- Coordinates: 30.0195°N 90.1233°W
- Owner: Pat Waters
- Type: Nightclub
- Event: Female impersonation

Construction
- Opened: 1936
- Closed: January 17, 1972
- Rebuilt: 1948

Club My-O-My was a former nightclub in the New Orleans area that employed female impersonators (now known as drag artists) as entertainers. Its predecessors were the Wonder Bar, and the Wonder Club.

== History ==
=== The Wonder Bar/The Powder Puff ===
In 1933, Emma and Emile Morlet opened a female impersonation venue at 125 Decatur Street, on the edge of the French Quarter. Contemporary sources refer to this early operation as the Powder Puff or the Wonder Bar. The club featured underground drag shows with live performances by female impersonators, influenced by European cabaret traditions, and is widely regarded as the first venue in New Orleans to present what are now recognised as drag shows.Quarter.

Between 1933 and 1936, the venue gained popularity while also attracting sustained attention from city authorities. Police raids were frequent, and municipal officials characterised the establishment as a threat to public morality. In 1936, following a police raid, owner Emile Morlet sought an injunction to prevent further interference, but the court denied the request on the grounds that the club constituted a menace to morality.

=== Wonder Club ===
Later in 1936, after continued police pressure, the Morlets closed the French Quarter venue and relocated outside Orleans Parish. The club reopened near Lake Pontchartrain, straddling the boundary between Orleans Parish and Jefferson Parish, and was renamed the Wonder Club. This location reduced exposure to local law enforcement and placed the club within the West End, an area then known for nightlife, casinos, and other vice-related businesses.

By the mid 1940s, female impersonation venues were sufficiently numerous in New Orleans to warrant a dedicated section in the city telephone directory. During this period, the Wonder Club became one of the most prominent such establishments in the region, attracting both local patrons and visitors.

=== Club My-O-My ===
In 1946 or 1947, the Wonder Club was renamed Club My-O-My. The name Club My-O-My appeared in print by October 25, 1947, when it was listed in Billboard magazine, indicating that the club had achieved national visibility within the entertainment industry.

On May 4, 1948, Club My-O-My was badly damaged by a fire, but was rebuilt shortly thereafter and resumed operations at its lakefront location.

From the late 1940s through the 1960s, Club My-O-My became one of the most well-known female impersonation clubs in the United States. Greyline Tours regularly transported tourists to the venue, and performances typically featured six female impersonators accompanied by a live band. For a period, Al Hirt was associated with the house band. The club operated under close scrutiny, with a sheriff stationed at the entrance, and performers routinely denied allegations of impropriety when challenged by authorities. For much of its existence, the club largely restricted its clientele and performers to white patrons and entertainers.

On January 17, 1972, Club My-O-My was destroyed by a second fire at its lakefront site. This incident effectively ended its long-standing presence in the West End. In the early 1970s, the club briefly relocated back to the French Quarter but did not survive for long. Broader changes in social norms, nightlife culture, and entertainment practices contributed to its final closure.

Club My-O-My formed part of a wider network of mid twentieth century female impersonation venues in New Orleans, alongside establishments such as the Caldonia Inn and the Dew Drop Inn, which also closed in the early 1970s. Together, these venues provided important platforms for early drag performers and helped shape the development of drag performance in the city. Although later periods saw drag become more commercialised and mainstream, Club My-O-My remains one of the most frequently cited examples of early drag club culture in New Orleans, notable for its longevity and its appeal to both heterosexual and homosexual audiences.

== Demographics ==
In 1972, Esther Newton listed Club My-O-My as being in the top four largest tourist clubs for female impersonation. The list included Club 82, Club My-O-My, Finocchio's Club, and the Jewel Box Lounge. She described a tourist club as one specializing exclusively in female impersonation performances, rather than acting primarily as a gay bar with only occasional performances.

One source says that Club My-O-My catered to a white audience, both heterosexuals and homosexuals, and was popular with tourists. Another source characterizes club-goers as mainly middle-class white heterosexuals and tourists.

== Culture ==
Kate Marlowe worked as a female impersonator at Club My-O-My in the 1960s, and describes the close bond of the entertainers there:

All the cast was really a club. We got thicker than thieves. We had potlucks together. We had orgies together. We went to the beach together. All of us were always together. I found that when you worked at the My-O-My you were part of the clique.

== Sex work ==
Marlowe describes Club My-O-My's culture of entertainers mixing with guests and hustling tables:

We hustled drinks again here. I wasn't new at this game. I thought I wrote most of the rules, but here it was a bit different. For one thing we worked together, sometimes in larger groups, but most of the time in pairs. If you were at a table you called to another "entertainer" to join the "party". It took only a couple of nights to learn they did all the tricks of Calumet City and a few new ones.

Customers purchased overpriced drinks, photos of female impersonators in drag, or other small items. In some cases they paid to see or touch entertainers. If customers paid enough, they could arrange for sex with an entertainer. Sex between customers and female impersonators occurred primarily in the apartments of the female impersonators, who lived near one another in the French Quarter. Away from work, entertainers from Club My-O-My also cruised the French Quarter for tourists, to turn tricks.

== See also ==
- Club 82 (New York City)
- Jewel Box Lounge (Kansas City, Missouri)
- Finocchio's Club (San Francisco)
- The Beige Room (San Francisco)
