= Miss Smith's Tea Room =

Lesbian bar in San Francisco, California (1954–1960)

Restaurant information
- Established: 1954
- Closed: 1960
- Location: 1353 Grant Avenue, San Francisco, California, U.S.
- Coordinates: 37.799471°N 122.407496°W

Miss Smith's Tea Room was a gay and lesbian bar in operation from 1954 to 1960 in the North Beach neighborhood at 1353 Grant Avenue in San Francisco, California, U.S.. It was a lesbian pickup spot, known for its Wednesday poetry nights and was a hangout for Beat poets. It is considered a pioneering gay bar, and had historically faced legal issues in order to maintain operations.

== History ==
It was owned and managed by LaVeta "Connie" Smith (1928–1995). Smith had previously waitressed at the Artist's Club, a 1940s lesbian dive bar in the city, and had also operated a jazz record shop on Grant Avenue.

Miss Smith's Tea Room served wine and beer, but no tea. Patrons would carved their names into the tables, and sawdust covered the floors.

Smith had legal issues around 1958 and was unsuccessfully charged under the statutes, and the bar had its beer and wine license revoked by the State Department of Alcoholic Beverage Control in an attempt to disrupt it from operating. In total, a collection of San Francisco LGBT venues opened and flourished in the early 1950s, including Miss Smith's Tea Room, the Paper Doll Club, The Beige Room, Tommy's Place/12 Adler Place, Tin Angel, Dolan's, and Gordon's.

== Closure and legacy ==
After the Miss Smith's Tea Room closed it became the Coffee Gallery (1954–1980), and later it became the Lost and Found Saloon (1980–2000). The former building is now Maggie McGarry's bar.

It was featured in the Kim Anno art exhibition "Lost and Found: A Museum of Lesbian Memory, Part 1" (2000) shown at "The Gay, Lesbian, Bisexual and Transgender Historical Society of Northern California," and at the San Francisco Public Library.

== See also ==
- List of lesbian bars
