= Angie Stardust =

American singer and drag artist (1939–2007)

- Born: Mel Michaels; 1939; Norfolk, Virginia, U.S
- Died: October 21, 2007 (aged 67–68); Hamburg, Germany
- Occupations: Singer, actress, and drag artist

Mel "Angie Stardust" Michaels (1939 – October 21, 2007) was an American singer, actress, and drag artist of the 1950s and 1960s and the first black star of New York's Club 82. She was also the manager of Hamburg, Germany's first all-male strip club, Crazy Boys, and was the founder and proprietor of Angie's Nightclub in Schmidts Tivoli Theatre.

Stardust died on October 21, 2007, at the age of 67–68.

== Early life ==
Stardust was born in Norfolk, Virginia and raised in Harlem, New York. She began performing at age 14 and was a transgender woman.

== Career ==
Stardust performed at the Jewel Box Revue and Club 82, both in New York City. She was one of the first drag stars to take female hormones, an act she was scorned for at the time, and either quit over or was fired for.

In 1974, Stardust moved to Europe, settling in Hamburg, Germany. There, she became manager of the city's first all-male strip club, Crazy Boys.

In 1983, Stardust performed in Rosa von Praunheim's City of Lost Souls, a film that helped influence Hedwig and the Angry Itch, in which she played the proprietor of a restaurant called the Hamburger Queen and a boarding house called Pension Stardust. Two of her co-stars were Jayne County and Tara O'Hara. The film was first screened as part of a punk rock roadshow. Shortly after the film was finished, Stardust completed her gender affirmation with surgery to complement the hormones she had been taking for years.

Stardust founded her own club, Angie's Nightclub, in Schmidts Tivoli Theatre in Hamburg, Germany in 1990. By 1994, the venue was regarded as "one of the best places to hear free-form jazz." Stardust performed nightly until 1999 and came to be known as the Big Mama of Soul, as she was known for singing soul, jazz, pop, and musical theater standards. In 1997 she recorded a version of Stephen Stills' "Love the One You're With" backed by Hamburg blues band Shanghai'd Gutz, at M.O.B. Tonstudio in Hamburg, with engineer Horst "Hobi" Siewert and American producer Daniel Liston Keller. Only a few hundred copies were released on Keller and Siewert's AlgoRhythm Recordings. Annually since 2008, Angie's Nightclub has been one of the participating venues for Hamburg's Reeperbahn Festival. Acts have included Skinny Lister, Mo Kenney, Ezra Furman, Kristoffer Ragnstam, Andreas Moe, Leyya, Louis Berry, George Cosby, Vita Bergen, Joel Culpepper, Conner Youngblood, Inna Modja, Bess Atwell, and others.

In 2017, Angie's Nightclub was still "one of the most popular clubs of Sankt Pauli’s night scene," according to the travel blog At 30,000 Feet. As of 2020, Stardust's club is still extant and operates under the same name.

== Discography ==
Year	Album type	Title
1994	CD	Inside Me
1993	Single/EP	Do It Yourself
1992	Backing vocals for Joy Peters	Joy Peters's Different Colours
1990	Single	Lady Madame

== Filmography ==
Date	Film
2016	Welcome All Sexes: 30 Jahre Teddy Awards
1987	Crazy Boys: A Handful of Fun
1983	City of Lost Souls
1981	Die Alptraumfrau
1970	Perrak
