= Club 82 =

Historic nightclub in New York City, US (1953–1973)

- Interactive map of Club 82
- Former names: 82 Club
- Address: 82 East 4th Street; New York, New York
- Coordinates: 40.7262°N 73.9899°W
- Owner: Anna Genovese
- Type: Nightclub
- Event: Female impersonation

Construction
- Built: 1926
- Opened: 1953
- Closed: 1973
- Architect: Charles B. Meyers

Club 82, also known as the 82 Club, was a nightclub in Manhattan, New York City that employed drag queens as entertainers. The nightclub had a second life as a music venue, but was eventually closed.

== History ==
=== Predecessors ===
The 181 Club was a predecessor to Club 82, and was named for its address at 181 Second Avenue. The club operated from 1945 to 1953, featuring male impersonators as waitstaff, and female impersonators as entertainers. The 181 Club lost its liquor license after being labelled a "hangout for perverts of both sexes".

=== Founding ===
Club 82 was connected to the Genovese crime family and the Costello crime syndicate. While mobster Vito Genovese was in hiding abroad, his wife Anna Genovese became hostess of Club 82. The club's tagline was "Who's No Lady," and its drag revues featured both male and female impersonators.

Kitt Russell, dubbed "America's top femme mimic" by Walter Winchell, hosted many of the shows, and countless acts performed in them, such as female impersonators Sonne Teal, Kim Christy, and Mel Michaels. Revues were long and elaborate, replete with sets and costumes, and with titles like Sincapades of 1954, A Vacation in Color, Fun-Fair for '57, and Time Out for Fun.

=== Investigation ===
In 1953, Club 82 came under police investigation with a potential loss of its liquor license, allegedly orchestrated by vindictive Vito to spite Anna. In testifying against her own clubs, Anna stated that the Club 82 was gang-owned. Her testimony ostensibly served to shift the blame from solely herself to her husband Vito's associates who had presided over, and allegedly monitored her activities running the club, while Vito was in exile in Italy.

The State Liquor Authority had previously revoked Club 82's liquor license on account of "disorderly conduct," which was code at the time for infractions involving things like serving alcohol to gay people, or people suspected of being gay.

== Culture ==
Although the entertainers were mostly gay, Club 82 catered primarily to heterosexuals.

Entertainers were reportedly overworked, and the club was frequented by wealthy celebrities:

Management had inhuman expectations of the cast, which performed three Broadway-level productions every night, in glamorous gowns from designer John Wong. Orchestra leader Johnny Wilson and Carnegie-trained show director Kit Russel didn't allow anyone to miss even one beat. Liberace, Burt Lancaster, Judy Garland, Frank Sinatra, Elizabeth Taylor, Tennessee Williams and other celebrities behaved badly. It was the type of place where a drunken Errol Flynn might play the piano—with his male member—onstage at two o'clock in the morning.

== Performers ==
One prominent performer at Club 82 was Angie Stardust. However, in the 1960s, after she began transgender hormone replacement therapy to medically transition, she was fired from Club 82 by the owners.

== See also ==
- Club My-O-My (New Orleans)
- Jewel Box Lounge (Kansas City, Missouri)
- Finocchio's Club (San Francisco)
- The Beige Room (San Francisco)
