= Kate Marlowe =

American transgender author and LGBTQ+ rights pioneer

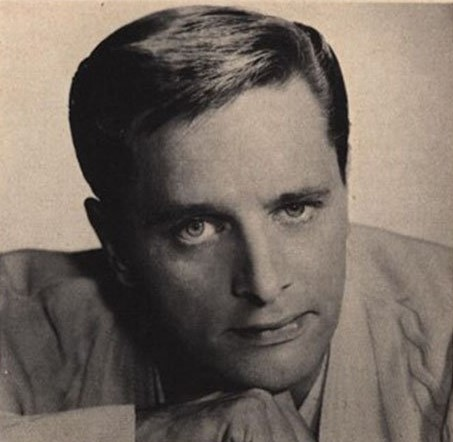
- Born: Kenneth Bies; November 26, 1926; Des Moines, Iowa, U.S.
- Died: April 30, 1990 (aged 63)
- Other name: Kenneth Marlowe
- Occupations: Author, entertainer, hairdresser
- Known for: Mr. Madam: Confessions of a Male Madam (1964)
- Spouse: Robert "Lonnie" Barnes

Katherine Marlowe Bies (born Kenneth Bies; November 26, 1926 – April 30, 1990), formerly known as Kenneth Marlowe, was an American author, entertainer, and hairdresser. She gained recognition for her memoir Mr. Madam: Confessions of a Male Madam (1964), and was considered a trailblazer in LGBTQ+ history.

== Career ==
=== Early years and entertainment ===
In 1948, Marlowe worked as an exotic dancer at Club My-O-My in New Orleans, a well-known venue for drag and cabaret performances.

During the late 1950s and early 1960s, she became a prominent hairdresser to celebrities such as Gypsy Rose Lee, Phyllis Diller, and Imogene Coca.

In 1971, Marlowe hosted a vaudeville-style event titled The Tricia Nixon Wedding/Vaudeville Returns at the Nob Hill Theatre in San Francisco.

=== Transition and advocacy ===
In 1975, Marlowe transitioned and began living as Katherine "Kate" Marlowe Bies. That year, she organized a fundraiser called The Ball to End All Balls at California Hall in San Francisco, which was attended by prominent figures such as journalist Armistead Maupin and burlesque performer Sally Rand.

=== Marriage ===
On June 29, 1977, she married Robert "Lonnie" Barnes, an inmate at San Quentin Prison. This marked one of the earliest known marriages involving a transgender person within the California prison system.

== Literary and theatrical work ==
=== Mr. Madam ===
In 1964, Marlowe published Mr. Madam: Confessions of a Male Madam, an autobiographical account of her life in the drag and sex work scenes. The book achieved cult status and contributed to her public persona.

=== Make Me Gorgeous! ===
In 2022, a stage play based on Marlowe's life, originally titled Mr. Madam, premiered in Portland. It was later adapted as Make Me Gorgeous! and opened Off-Broadway at Playhouse 46 in New York City in November 2023, receiving favorable reviews.

== Legacy ==
Marlowe's life as a gender-nonconforming entertainer, author, and activist positioned her as a pioneer in LGBTQ+ history. Her story continues to be revisited and honored through books, theatre, and academic work.
