= Tommy's Place/12 Adler Place =

Lesbian bars in San Francisco, California

- Address: San Francisco; United States
- Location: North Beach
- Type: Lesbian bar

Tommy's Place (formerly Tommy's Joint) and 12 Adler Place were two interconnected lesbian bars in the North Beach district of San Francisco. Together, they created the first business in San Francisco that was owned and managed by out lesbians, beginning in the late 1940s. Tommy's Place/12 Adler Place was the site of an infamous 1954 police raid, during the era of the Lavender Scare. The raid was heavily covered by local media and ultimately contributed to the bar's 1955 closure.

== History ==
In the late 1940s, Eleanor "Tommy" F. Vasu moved to San Francisco. There is little known of her life before moving to California, but some information is provided by census records. She was born on May 29, 1917, in Ohio to John and Mary Vasu, both Romanian immigrants. Tommy spent her early life in Cuyahoga, Ohio (1920 census address) and Brownhelm, Lorain (1930 census address). She completed up to the first year of high school. She lived on a farm in Vermilion, Ohio, in 1935. By 1940, Tommy lived in Pontiac, Michigan, with her younger brother, Romy, along with a lodger named Walter M Wedersky. In the census records, Tommy was listed as head of the household. Her profession was listed as "sales clerk" and her income was $230.

By the time she came to San Francisco, she quickly became a local figure. Tommy socialized with gangsters, enjoyed gambling, used the men's bathroom, and frequently played liar's dice with Walter Keane. Tommy was also known for her style. She had a short hairstyle, drove a Cadillac convertible, and wore expensive double-breasted suits with a fedora. As described by Pat Bond, a lesbian activist and community historian:

"[S]he made a lot of money and she would go with hookers a lot. And she would buy them fur coats and John Fredericks [sic] hats. [A]nything you wanted, Tommy could get it for you. You wanted a watch, she'd bring out forty watches. She liked being a gangster, like Frank Sinatra, that kind of [thing]. She was in drag from the time she was twelve. All her life."

In 1948, Vasu opened Tommy's Joint with Jeanne Sullivan, her girlfriend, Grace Miller, and Joyce van der Veer. The bar was located at 299 Broadway Street in a four-story brick building. The bar was located in the bottom two levels of the building, and the floors were covered in sawdust, reminiscent of another local lesbian bar, Mona's 440 Club. The two upper levels of the building were occupied by The Firenze Hotel, which was known as a location to meet with sex workers. Some local historians claimed that Tommy worked as a pimp. According to FoundSF:

"The 299 Broadway site was where businessmen from the nearby financial district could find a willing hooker out of sight of prying eyes at places like Paoli's. Stevedores from the docks close by also partook of the hookers on paydays. The hookers were the girlfriends of the butches who hung out there."

In 1952, the bar moved to 529 Broadway Street, where it was renamed Tommy's Place. When this happened, Tommy's Place became connected with another lesbian bar, 12 Adler Place. For all intents and purposes, the two bars were one bar. They shared a staircase and a liquor license. The bars were connected with a split-level mezzanine, the bottom two floors operated as a bar, while the top two floors acted as a hotel, for prostitution. At Tommy's Place, the liquor license was under Sullivan's name, who owned a 94% stake of the liquor license in total. At 12 Adler Place, the remaining 6% of liquor license was in Miller's and van der Veer's names. Vasu could not have the liquor license in her name due to previous convictions.

This created a dynamic in which Tommy's Place was the upstairs location, where customers came to see entertainment. There was a corner bar that could accommodate about 15 people, tables for two along both walls, and framed photos of women on the walls. Meanwhile, 12 Adler was the downstairs lesbian pick-up bar, patronized by butch and femme lesbians. The 12 Adler location was smaller and darker. Customers could enter the bar at either address, and choose which bar space to socialize in. Most female customers chose to socialize in 12 Adler.

In 1953, Vasu charged Rudy Eichenbaum, a former bar manager and friend, for physically assaulting her in 1949, when she refused to pay him protection money for the 299 Broadway location.

The period between 1951-1954 saw a blossoming of LGBT nightlife in San Francisco, especially in North Beach and the Tenderloin. This was due to a few factors. First, a 1951 case against the 585 Club, a gay bar on Post Street, found that police could not arrest patrons unless they had clearly committed a crime. Because the patrons were merely at a bar, the police could not arrest them. This ruling helped encourage locals to open and maintain LGBT nightlife spots. Second, the influence of the beat generation helped bring a more open, transgressive sexuality into local culture. Writers such as Allen Ginsberg and Jack Kerouac, both of whom lived in North Beach, wrote about intimate male friendship and homosexual experiences. The famous Ginsberg poem Howl, which openly discussed homosexuality, was first performed at Six Gallery and later published by City Lights Publishers (across from 12 Adler Place) in 1955. In total, a collection of San Francisco LGBT venues opened and flourished in the early 1950s, including Tommy's Bar/12 Adler Place, Miss Smith's Tea Room (new bar), Tin Angel (new bar), The Beige Room (relocated bar), the Paper Doll (new supper club), Dolan's (new supper club), and Gordon's (new supper club).

== Police investigations ==
Beginning in the late 1940s, a homophobic moral panic and wave of repression swept across the United States, including in San Francisco. This was known as the Lavender Scare. In 1951, the San Francisco Police Department defined a new category of crime: "sex offenses." This category was designated for nonviolent sexual crimes outside of prostitution, such as obscene literature, public exposure, and contributing to juvenile delinquency. Meanwhile, in June 1954, the San Francisco Examiner published an article, which claimed "a marked influx recently of homosexuals" and that homosexuals "preyed on" teenagers and people's weaknesses. The newspaper then published an editorial demanding that police take action.

In 1953, Tommy's Place was placed on an "off-limits" list created by the US military, after it was cited for "undesirable conditions which adversely affect the health and welfare of service personnel." Later, in early 1954, parents of two San Francisco teenagers lodged a police complaint, stating that their daughters were frequenting the bar and becoming intoxicated from drugs provided by adult women. Thus, the police opened an investigation into the bar, where they interviewed dozens of local teenagers, ranging from 14 to 18 years old.

The investigations produced a series of findings. The teenagers spoke of a butch-femme social dynamic that was centered around Tommy's Place/12 Adler Place. Police reports detailed that teens had recruited other youth to wear "mannish clothes," call themselves "butch" and "femme," and visit the bars. The teens claimed that they were able to purchase various drugs, such as marijuana and benzedrines, at the bars. They also stated that they were "accosted" by older women and, in some cases, by men. Furthermore, some teens spoke of a 51-year old African-American male carpenter, named Jessie Joseph Winston. They claimed that Winston was a regular patron of Tommy's Place/12 Adler Place, and that he had often invited them back to his apartment for parties.

In June 1954, Police Chief Michael Gaffey launched a campaign against homosexuality. He stated his plans to "clean the homosexuals from the streets, the public rooms and the parks where their actions have become intolerably offensive." In June 1954, the police began to arrest men in bars and parks with accusations of homosexual activity, and they launched investigations into five Tenderloin bars. In August 1954, Gaffey issued complaints to the liquor board, stating that they were too lenient on bars that catered to homosexuals. He protested against the liquor licenses of specific bars, which included Mona's 440 Club.

== 1954 police raids ==
On September 1, 1954, the SFPD raided the Telegraph Hill apartment of Winston. In the apartment, police found firearms and three marijuana joints. Two of the joints were marked with lipstick. Police claimed that Winston had plied the teens with marijuana and alcohol and introduced them to a "philosophy of rebellion." That night, Winston was charged with contributing to juvenile delinquency.

On September 8, 1954, at 9:00 pm, the SFPD raided Tommy's Place and 12 Adler Place, after a "seven-months investigation." The policemen carried warrants for the arrest of the two women on the liquor license: Grace Miller (35 years old; owner/bartender) and Joyce van der Veer (27 years old; owner/bartender). They also brought along two teenage girls, so they could identify Miller and van der Veer. In the raid, police cleared the bar of about 30 patrons. They found underage girls at the bar. A heroin kit was also allegedly found, taped to the washbasin in the bathroom, which many believe to have been planted by the police. That night, Miller and van der Veer were arrested. The two individuals were issued multiple charges: giving narcotics to minors, possessing narcotics, and contributing to the delinquency of minors. The bars were padlocked by the police that night.

The case became a sensationalized media story, frequently covered by the San Francisco Examiner and San Francisco Chronicle. The new headlines were often titillating, such as "S. F. Teen-Age Girls Tell of 'Vice Academy,'" as written in a September 10 Chronicle headline. The articles were full of salacious language, such as "sex thrill bar" and a "hangout for sexual deviates." Some articles also fell upon racist tropes and hysteria, such as claiming that Winston had recruited young girls into "white slavery." The Examiner reported that drugs were supplied through an African-American "drug ring," located on Fillmore Street. Furthermore, the privacy of the defendants was violated. Photographs, names, ages, and personal addresses of the arrested women were printed in newspapers.

In response, the Mattachine Society newsletter published a defense of the bar owners. The defense stated: "The owners deny these charges." Furthermore, "They have forced strict identification rules and have not tolerated the presence of any suspected or known drug addicts."

In March 1955, a hearing took place to determine if the liquor license of the bar should be revoked. A San Francisco Chronicle journalist reported that some women seemed reluctant to testify, including an 18-year old brunette. However, the women felt forced to testify so that they would not receive charges themselves. A woman named Marie Serrano, a 20 year old resident of Sunnydale Avenue, testified at the hearing. She stated that she had been served alcohol as a teenage customer at Tommy's Place on multiple occasions, and she had never been asked for identification. She also stated that she drank at many other bars as a teenager, such as the Casbah on Mission Street, Zanzibar on Ocean Avenue, and the Emerald Isle. During the hearing, Sullivan testified and stated that she always asked young customers for their age. She also stated that a policeman named "Jim" often conducted checks at the bar, but he never arrested anyone. Miller was found guilty on two counts of contributing to the delinquency of minors. Van der Deer was allowed to go free by the jury. Sullivan was never arrested.

Ultimately, the three individuals received different sentences. On December 2, 1955, van der Veer was acquitted on the charge of contributing to the delinquency of a minor. This ruling enraged PTA groups across the region, and it emboldened them to rally for Tommy's Place to lose its liquor license. Meanwhile, Miller was convicted of serving beer to minors. She was sentenced to six months in county jail. The worst sentencing, however, went to Winston, who was the only African-American and only male among the three. Winston received convictions on three counts of supplying marijuana to a minor and one count for possession of marijuana. Winston was sentenced to five years in San Quentin State Prison.

== Aftermath ==
In December 1954, over 40 PTA group members joined a meeting for the State Board of Equalization, demanding that they revoke the liquor license for Tommy's Place/12 Adler Place. One seventeen year old girl gave testimony of drinking at the bars since she was 13 years old, although she also admitted to drinking at other establishments.

In 1955, Tommy's Place/12 Adler Place officially closed. The owners transferred the license to Frank Guidera. The 12 Adler Place location was renamed Frank's, before becoming Specs' Twelve Adler Museum Cafe in 1968. The Tommy's Place location became the Garden of Eden strip club. Overall, the closure of Tommy's Place/12 Adler Place was due to many factors, including the police raids, sensationalized media coverage, the Lavender Scare, and the PTA crusade against the bar. In the 1950s, mainstream American culture placed high value on heterosexual marriage, the nuclear family, defined gender roles, and repressed female sexuality. Lesbian bars, by contrast, were seen as transgressive and a direct threat to such values. Furthermore, the fact that lesbians often congregated in bars lent to the association of lesbianism with drugs and alcohol consumption. For this reason, as written in Wide Open Town: A History of Queer San Francisco from 1965, "The 1954 raid on Tommy's Place... illustrates the dynamic and highlights the vulnerabilities of San Francisco lesbian communities in the postwar era." In total, the pressures of such times contributed to the bar's closure.

After the bar's closure, Tommy continued to live and work in the North Beach neighborhood into the 1960s, where she ran the Broadway Parking concession. Her girlfriend, "a beautiful blonde," allegedly became a heroin addict, and Tommy became a heroin dealer to help support her girlfriend's habit and financial needs.

In March 1968, it was reported that Vasu, 51 years old at the time, was arrested with nine other men in a "dope raid." Vasu was called the leader of the gang, which was suspected of selling $36,000 worth of amphetamine per week, along with selling heroin and marijuana. The gang was caught when an undercover cop, "posing as a bearded, leather-jacket motorcyclist," made a few small purchases of heroin and speed. Some purchases were made at the 219 Club, on Jones Street. Another was made at the parking lot that Vasu managed. One final purchase was made in Oakland, and the dealer tried to flee in an automobile owned by Vasu. The Examiner article listed the personal address of Vasu on Fresno Street.

In August 1969, Tommy Vasu was officially convicted of selling heroin. She served a five year sentence at Tehachapi State Prison. She was reportedly murdered shortly after her release, on September 21, 1978. She was 61 years old, and her last recorded address was in Glendale, California.
