= Lawrence B. Mohr =

American political scientist (1931–2025)

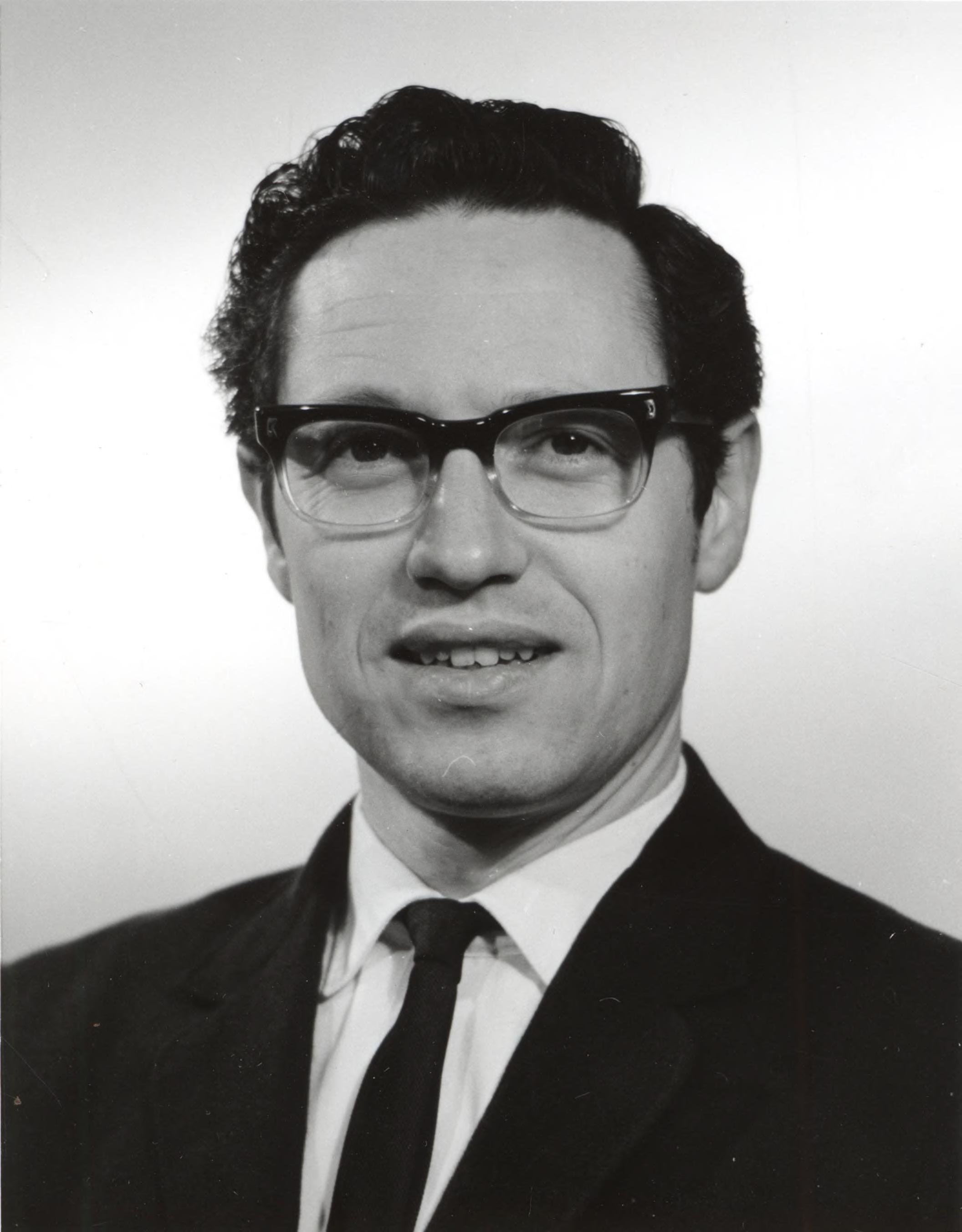
- Mohr in 1968
- Born: May 5, 1931; Los Angeles, California, United States
- Died: March 9, 2025 (aged 93); Chicago, Illinois, United States
- Education: University of Chicago; University of Michigan
- Awards: Donald T. Campbell Award from the Policy Studies Organization (1992)
- Scientific career
- Fields: Political science Policy studies
- Institutions: University of Michigan
- Thesis: Determinants of Innovation in Organizations (1966)

Lawrence B. "Larry" Mohr (May 5, 1931 – March 9, 2025) was an American political scientist and Professor Emeritus of Political Science and Public Policy in the Gerald R. Ford School of Public Policy at the University of Michigan. He served on the University of Michigan's faculty from 1966 until retiring on May 31, 1999. Previously, he was half of the folk-blues musical duo Odetta and Larry, along with Odetta, whom he first met in 1953.

== Bibliography ==
- Mohr, Lawrence B. (1982). Explaining Organizational Behavior. Jossey-Bass. ISBN 978-0-87589-514-7.
- Mohr, Lawrence B. (1990). Understanding Significance Testing. Quantitative applications in the social sciences. SAGE Publications, Inc. doi:10.4135/9781412986434. ISBN 978-0-8039-3568-6.
- Mohr, Lawrence B. (1995). Impact Analysis for Program Evaluation. SAGE. ISBN 978-0-8039-5936-1.
- Mohr, Lawrence B. (1996). The Causes of Human Behavior: Implications for Theory and Method in the Social Sciences. University of Michigan Press. doi:10.3998/mpub.14489. ISBN 978-0-472-10665-3.
