= Finocchio's Club =

Historic nightclub in San Francisco featuring entertainment by female impersonators

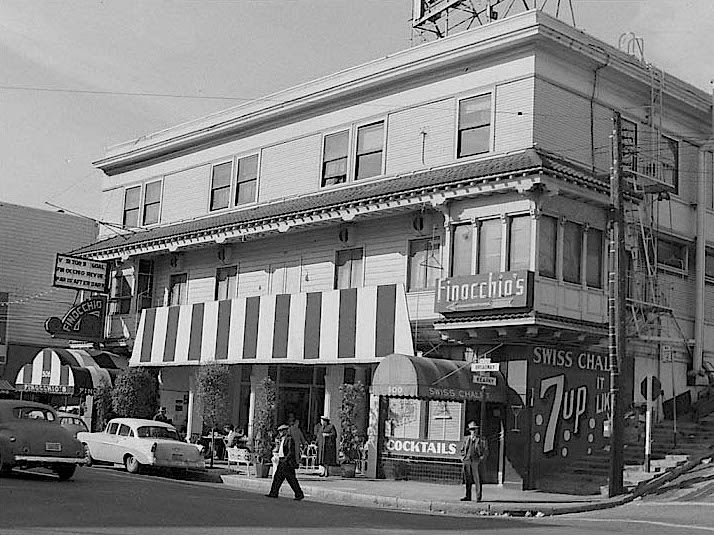
- Finocchio's Club (1958) in San Francisco, California
- Interactive map of Finocchio's Club

Restaurant information
- Established: June 15, 1936
- Closed: November 27, 1999
- Previous owners: Joseph "Joe" Finocchio, Eve Finocchio
- Location: 506 Broadway Street, San Francisco, California
- Coordinates: 37.798419°N 122.405827°W

Finocchio's' Club was a former nightclub and bar in operation from 1936 to 1999 in North Beach, San Francisco, California. The club started as a speakeasy, "the 201 Club", in 1929, owned by Joe and Eve Finicchio. It was located at 406 Stockton Street, in San Francisco. In 1933, with the repeal of prohibition, the club moved upstairs and started to offer female impersonation acts. Following a series of police raids in 1936, Finnochio's Club relocated. The new, expanded location of Finocchio's opened on June 15, 1936; it was located at 506 Broadway Street, (above Enrico's Cafe) in the North Beach area of San Francisco, California.

Finocchio's shut down on November 27, 1999.

== Name ==
The term finocchio is Italian for fennel, but is also a negative slang term for homosexual. Finocchio are described as young male prostitutes, often underage, working at brothels. In New York City, the Italian word finocchio was common derogatory slang for homosexual men, equivalent to fairy or faggot.

== History ==
Joseph "Joe" Finocchio, the creator of the club, had the idea of a nightclub with female impersonators in costumes when a patron jokingly went on the stage of his club and did a routine that the crowd enjoyed. The club was not advertised as a gay club; it was advertised as a place for entertainment and fun. Both gay and straight performers worked there. The acts included varying ethnic-inspired performances such as geisha-style performances, which may have helped encourage tourists and contributed to the diverse, often racially diverse crowds, which was unusual during this time of segregation. In the days before gay liberation, female impersonator clubs provided semi-public social spaces for sexual minorities to congregate.

Finocchio's often featured traditional drag, with performers in gowns singing or lip-synching to top 40 ballads.

Finocchio's was "off limits" during World War II, not due to the entertainment, but rather for selling liquor to the military outside the authorized hours of sales. On December 31, 1943 the ban was lifted after Joe Finocchio and other bar owners signed an agreement to limit liquor sales to military personnel between 5 pm and midnight.

Finocchio's was a huge favorite with tourists from the 1930s to the early 1990s. Joe Finocchio died in January 1986. Eve Finocchio, Joe's widow, decided to close the club on November 27, 1999 because of a significant increase in the monthly rent and dwindling audience attendance.

Some other notable female impersonators acts and nightclubs of the era include The Beige Room in San Francisco; Club My-O-My in New Orleans; Club 82 in New York City; and the traveling Jewel Box Revue.

== Prostitution ==
Finocchio's nightclub combined entertainment with sex trade and prostitution. With the criminalization of prostitution, there was a general trend away from commercial brothels and towards nightclubs. While some nightclubs had rooms rented by the hour, Finocchio's did not have these.

In 1936, Finocchio's nightclub was subjected to a police raid. Five female impersonators were arrested, along with the owners of the club. The owners were arrested for employing entertainers on a percentage basis. This was reputed to lead to entertainers mingling with male customers, trading attention and sexual favors for drinks at an inflated price. Following the police raid, the owners moved Finocchio's to a different location, hired more entertainers, and stopped employing the entertainers on a percentage basis. Following the police raid on Finocchio's, the 201 Club had its dance permit revoked for employing female impersonators on a percentage basis. The entertainers were known to mingle with guests, soliciting drinks.

In the 1950's, Harry Benjamin began administering estrogen-based hormone replacement therapy to prospective transsexuals in San Francisco. He relayed information about the prostitution infrastructure for female impersonators at Finocchio's nightclub in the 1950's:

As to Prostitution, she says: "they [female impersonators] are all available or at least 95 percent." Since here at Finnochio's [sic] the performers are not allowed to mingle with guests, the dates are made thru the waiters. If a customer gives the waiter less than two dollars for delivering the note, this note is never delivered or remains unanswered. A 5 dollar tip to the waiter means the customer is willing to pay $50 or more for the date including sex of course.

Friedman writes that this method of arranging "dates" had precedent in the "messenger boy" culture of New York City and Chicago in the 1950's. Rates of $20–50 were at least twice as expensive as rates by cross-dressing street prostitutes during that same era. In 1972, an article in Lee Brewster's Drag magazine mentions the practical aspects of prostitution found there, and $50 for sex with an attractive female impersonator:

The 'stars' of the show are paid about $60 per week, half of which is in cash. If the performer misses one night during the week she doesn't get the cash half of her salary. Can you imagine such an unfair arrangement? As a result, most of the performers are forced to hustle their male customers to earn a living—not that most of them don't enjoy what they're doing (on stage and off). Some of the better-looking 'queens' won't even talk to a male customer unless he guarantees a $50. And so the performer soon learns how to make a living, and the act on stage becomes little more than a showcase, a parade of what's available.

== Influence ==
A 14-page program, "Finocchio's: America's Most Unusual Nightclub", was published by Zevin-Present, circa 1947. The Finocchio shows published playbills. After Finocchio's closed, they donated the costumes, photos and programs to the GLBT Historical Society.

It is thought that Finocchio's was the catalyst for the art of drag. Celebrities who attended shows at Finocchio's throughout their many years of operation included Frank Sinatra, Howard Hughes, Ava Gardner, Tallulah Bankhead, David Niven, Errol Flynn, Judy Garland, Marilyn Monroe, Bette Davis, Marlene Dietrich, Lena Horne, Joan Crawford, Barbra Streisand, Mae West, Carol Channing, William Haines, Elizabeth Taylor, Montgomery Clift, Roddy McDowall, Liza Minnelli, Cher and Bette Midler among others.

After the closure, another San Francisco establishment called Harry Denton's Starlight Room started a drag show in 2006 called "Sunday's a Drag," a female impersonation show modeled after Finocchio's. These shows are hosted by Donna Sachet.

== Notable acts ==
Artists who performed at Finocchio's included (in alphabetical order):

- David de Alba, often dressed as Judy Garland or Liza Minnelli.
- Angel Amor
- Vaughn Auldon
- Jim Bailey, performed at Finocchio's in the 1970s.
- Kenny Bee (also known as Kenneth Bachelor)
- Bobby Belle
- Francis Blair
- Ray Bourbon
- Aleshia Brevard, her Marilyn Monroe impression became so well known that Marilyn Monroe came to see her perform.
- Lenny Bruce, comedian
- LaVern Cummings
- Francis David
- Val DeVere
- Frank Doran
- Ray Francis
- Nicki Gallucci
- Candi Guerrero
- William Hart
- Tex Hendrix
- Sir Lady Java
- Bobby Johnson
- Pussy Katt
- Brian Keith
- Bambi Lake
- Milton LaMaire
- Lestra La Mont
- Jeri-Lane
- Paul La Ray
- Harvey Lee (also known as Harvey Wilson Goodwin)
- Del LeRoy
- Li-Kar, performed a "Geisha dance" and was also a designer and artist, contributing visuals to the Finocchio's playbill.
- John Lonas
- Johnny Mangum
- Katherine Marlowe
- Niles Marsh
- Jackie Maye
- Kelly Michaels, as Madonna in the late 1980s.
- Mike Michelle
- Karyl Norman, worked at Finocchino's circa the 1930s, a former well-known vaudeville performer.
- Lucian Phelps ("a Sophie Tucker expert", or "Male Sophie Tucker") would wear Sophie Tucker's actual gowns and early in their career performed vaudeville.
- Jackie Philips
- Charles Pierce
- Russell Reed
- Freddie Renault
- Libby Reynolds
- Craig Russell
- Lori Shannon
- Nikki Starr
- Francis Stillman
- William Stoffler
- Holotta Tymes
- Carroll Wallace
- Holly White

== See also ==
- Pansy Craze, prohibition-era popularization of drag queens within the LGBTQ community
- Club 82 – New York City nightclub (1926–1973) featuring female impersonators
- Club My-O-My – New Orleans nightclub (1933–1972) featuring female impersonators.
- Black Cat Bar – San Francisco queer bar (open 1906–1921; re-opened 1933–1964).
- The Beige Room – San Francisco gay nightclub featuring female impersonators (1949–1958)
