= The Beige Room =

Gay nightclub in San Francisco, California (1949–1958)

Restaurant information
- Established: 1949
- Closed: 1958
- Previous owner(s): Al Burgess, Chinkie Naditz
- Location: 831 Broadway, San Francisco, California
- Coordinates: 37.797184°N 122.410795°W

The Beige Room, also known simply as Beige Room, was an American nightclub known for gay female impersonators, in operation from 1949 to 1958 and located at 831 Broadway in the North Beach neighborhood of San Francisco, California.

== History ==
The club was owned by Al Burgess and Chinkie Naditz; and was founded in 1949 at 2215 Powell Street, and it moved in 1951 to the Broadway address. On Sundays The Beige Room would host dance parties.

The performers were openly gay, unlike at other female impersonator clubs at the time. The Beige Room performers included owner Al Burgess, T.C. Jones, Lynne Carter, Leslie Marlowe, Ray Saunders, and Kenneth Marlowe. José Sarria performed at The Beige Room before moving to the Black Cat Bar. Lynne Carter was a club headliner, she was famous for doing impersonations of Pearl Bailey and Josephine Baker and would often socialize with the patrons after the performances.

In total, a collection of San Francisco LGBT venues opened and flourished in the early 1950s, including The Beige Room, Tommy's Place/12 Adler Place, Miss Smith’s Tea Room, Tin Angel, the Paper Doll, Dolan's (new supper club), and Gordon's (new supper club).

== See also ==
- Club 82
- Club My-O-My
- Finocchio's Club
