= Tin Angel (San Francisco) =

Nightclub in California from 1953 to 1961

Tin Angel On-The-Levee
- Interactive map of Tin Angel; On-The-Levee

Restaurant information
- Previous owner(s): Peggy Tolk–Watkins (1953 to 1958), Kid Ory (1958 to 1961)
- Location: 981 Embarcadero, San Francisco, California, U.S.
- Coordinates: 37.803175°N 122.401589°W
- Active dates: 1953–July 1961

The Tin Angel was a lesbian nightclub, live music venue, and restaurant in operation from 1953 to 1961, on the Embarcadero at 981 Embarcadero (near Pier 23) in San Francisco, California The venue and its founder were credited as "spearheading the 'Jazz on the Waterfront' movement" in the 1950s. In 1958, the club ownership changed and it was renamed On-The-Levee, before its closure in July 1961.

== Sausalito ==
In 1950, self-taught painter Peggy Tolk–Watkins moved to the Bay Area, and opened the first Tin Angel on Sausalito's waterfront, at 588 Bridgeway Boulevard from 1948 to July 1951. She got the building, a crab restaurant, from Matt Lange, who had housed his launch business there for twenty-nine years. In 1952, she sold the business and spent a year traveling in Europe with her son, Ragland. Since 1969, the property has been a Scoma's Restaurant.

== The Embarcadero ==
The Embarcadero venue was managed by Tolk–Watkins, who worked in co-ownership with bordello owner and later-Sausalito-mayor, Sally Stanford.

In 1958, Kid Ory purchased the nightclub from Peggy Tolk–Watkins, and renamed it On-The-Levee. The venue closed in July 1961, and in 1962 the building was demolished due to the creation of the Embarcadero Freeway.

Folk singer Odetta got her start performing at the Tin Angel in San Francisco. A short while later Odetta joined the duo of Odetta and Larry and they performed at the Tin Angel for about 8 months. The Odetta and Larry duo released a self-titled album on Fantasy Records, recorded in 1953 and 1954 at the Tin Angel. Other performers at Tin Angel included Bob Scobey, Turk Murphy, Kid Ory, Muggsy Spanier, George Lewis, Bob Mielke, Claire Austin, and Lizzie Miles with Wally Rose.

== Fallen Angel ==
In 1954 Tolk–Watkins partnered with Sally Stanford to open the Fallen Angel at 1144 Pine Street in San Francisco, a former brothel site of Sally's.

== Legacy ==
Tolk–Watkins was referred to as "queen of the dykes", and Tin Angel was considered a lesbian nightclub.

The album cover for Turk Murphy's When The Saints Go Marching In (1954) features an image of the interior of the club.

In total, a collection of San Francisco LGBT venues opened and flourished in the early 1950s, including the Tin Angel, Paper Doll Club, The Beige Room, Tommy's Place/12 Adler Place, Miss Smith’s Tea Room, Dolan's, and Gordon's. In 1954, Tolk–Watkins opened another venue in San Francisco named, The Fallen Angel at 1144 Pine Street, the building was formerly the Sally Stanford bordello. In June 1958, Tolk–Watkins sold the Tin Angel club to Kid Ory, and it was renamed On-The-Levee. The bar closed in July 1961, and was demolished in 1962 because of the creation of the Embarcadero Freeway.

It was featured in the Kim Anno art exhibition "Lost and Found: A Museum of Lesbian Memory, Part 1" (2000) shown at "The Gay, Lesbian, Bisexual and Transgender Historical Society of Northern California," and at the San Francisco Public Library.

== See also ==
- List of lesbian bars
- West Coast jazz
