= Vesuvio Cafe =

Bar in San Francisco

Coordinates: 37.797535°N 122.406407°W

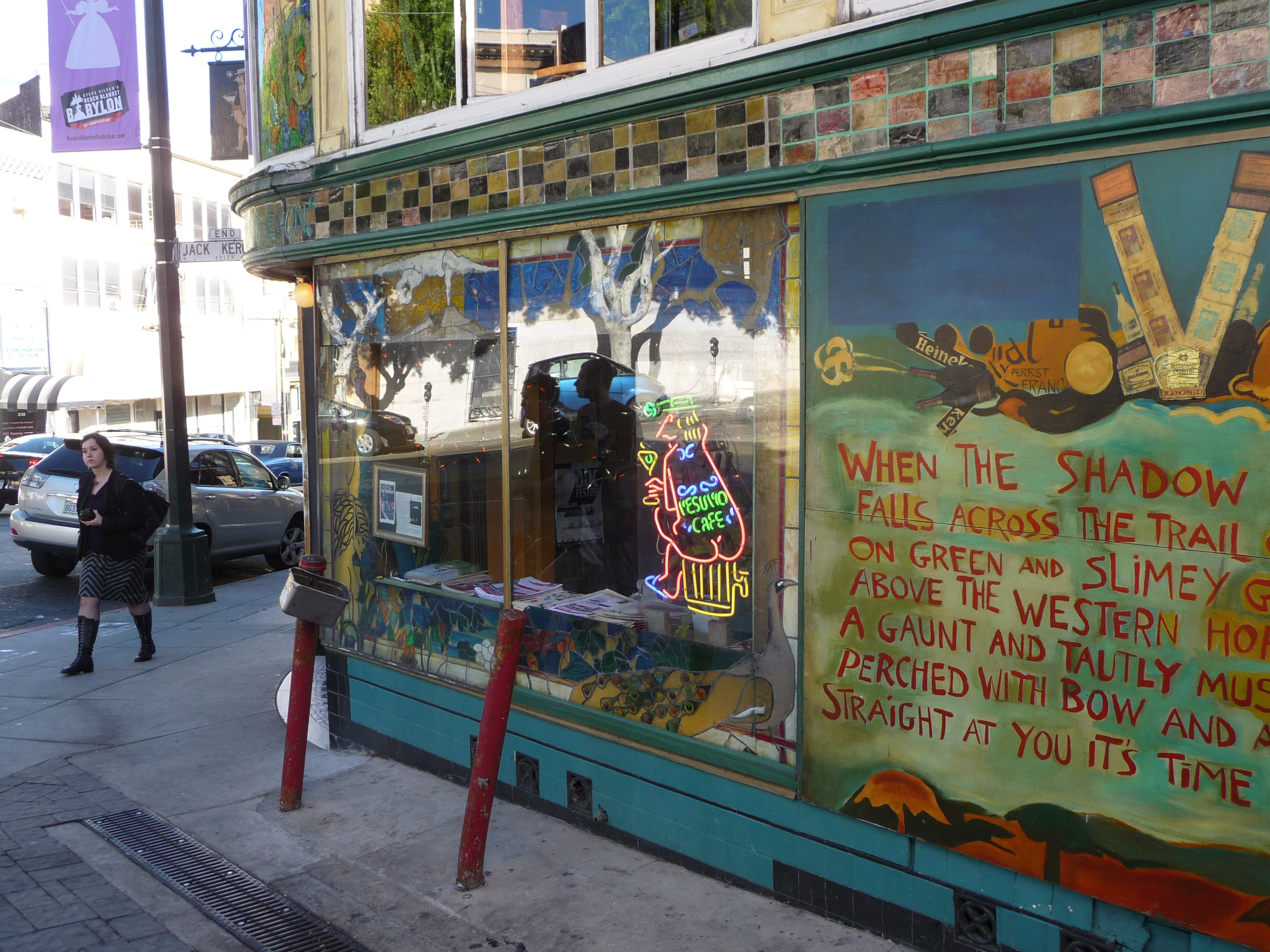
- Mural outside Vesuvio Cafe
- Interactive map of Vesuvio Cafe
- Location: North Beach, San Francisco, United States
- Type: Bar

Construction
- Opened: 1948

Website
- vesuvio.com

Vesuvio Cafe is a historic bar in San Francisco, California, United States. Located at 255 Columbus Avenue, across an alley from City Lights Bookstore, the building was designed and built in 1913 by Italian architect Italo Zanolini, and remodeled in 1918.

== History ==
The bar was founded in 1948 by Henri Lenoir, and was frequented by a number of Beat Generation celebrities including Jack Kerouac, Allen Ginsberg, Lawrence Ferlinghetti, and Neal Cassady.

Former part-owner and manager emeritus Leo Riegler died in 2017.

The common alley shared with City Lights was originally called "Adler" but was renamed "Jack Kerouac Alley" in 1988. The alley was refurbished and converted to pedestrian only in 2007.
