= Odetta & Larry =

Blues-folk duo active in the 1950s

- Odetta & Larry: Volume 1 album cover, 1954

Background information
- Origin: San Francisco, California, U.S.
- Genres: Folk, blues
- Years active: 1953–1954
- Label: Fantasy

Odetta & Larry was a short-lived blues-folk duo in the mid-1950s. It consisted of Odetta and Lawrence B. Mohr, the former of whom became the better known in ensuing decades.

== Background ==
Odetta Holmes and Lawrence B. Mohr met at a bar called "The Lamp" on Kearney Street in North Beach, San Francisco, in 1953, the area that the Beatniks were soon to inspire. Odetta was in San Francisco because she was travelling with the chorus of the musical Finian's Rainbow. Lawrence (Larry) had just finished college at the University of Chicago, and travelled to San Francisco with his best friend, who was shipping overseas into the Navy.

"The Lamp" was famous for its musical environment. People would spend evenings there jamming with guitars, banjos, and other musical instruments. On one fateful evening in the summer of 1953, Larry began playing a Lead Belly song and Odetta joined in harmony. They jammed together, and that was the beginning.

== Tin Angel ==
Odetta was becoming known around North Beach, San Francisco, and stayed in town after Finian’s Rainbow left. She was hired to sing at a club called The Purple Onion, which made her well known in the club-arena.

Shortly thereafter, Odetta was hired by Peggy Tolk–Watkins, owner of the Tin Angel, to sing most evenings at the club. When she saw how well Odetta grooved with Larry, Peggy hired Larry too. Most evenings, the pair would each do a solo set and then a set together. On a typical evening, the audience numbered 30–40 persons.

Max and Sol Weiss, the owners of Fantasy Records, asked Odetta and Larry to make an album, which they titled Odetta & Larry (originally a 10-inch LP and then expanded to a 12-inch LP, and eventually expanded into a CD). They recorded over several evenings in 1953 and 1954. The songs that appeared on the album were chosen based on how well Odetta, Larry, the Weisses, and the audience liked each song. Altogether, Odetta and Larry performed at the Tin Angel for about eight months.

== After the Tin Angel ==
The duo ceased playing together because Larry was drafted into the army, and was soon shipped to Bordeaux, France. By the time he returned to San Francisco from the army in 1956, the Tin Angel had folded. The duo reconnected and played several concerts in Berkeley, San Francisco and Los Angeles. The pair began growing in different directions as Odetta went on to an illustrious professional singing career and Larry went on to an accomplished academic career. He worked for the United States Public Health Service in Washington, D.C., for many years, went to graduate school, and eventually became a professor of Political Science at the University of Michigan. "We remained friends and saw each other from time to time — not often," Larry said in a 2012 interview.

== Track listing ==
1. "John Henry"
2. "Old Cotton Fields at Home"
3. "The Frozen Logger"
4. "Run, Come See Jerusalem"
5. "Old Blue"
6. "Water Boy"
7. "Santa Ana"
8. "I was Born About 10,000 Years Ago"/"The Biggest Thing Man Has Ever Done"
9. "The Car-Car Song"
10. "No More Cane on the Brazos"
11. "Pay Day At Coal Creek"
12. "I've Been Buked and I've Been Scorned"
13. "Rock Island Line"
14. "Another Man Don' Gone"
15. "Children, Go Where I Send Thee"
16. "I Know Where I'm Going"
17. "He's Got the Whole World in His Hands"
18. "Timber"
19. "Wade in the Water"

== Discography ==
- The Tin Angel presents Odetta & Larry Vol. 1 (Fantasy EP-4017 1954)
- The Tin Angel presents Odetta & Larry Vol. 2 (Fantasy EP-4018 1954)
- The Tin Angel presents Odetta & Larry (Fantasy LP 3-15 1954)
- Odetta & Larry (1954), also known as The Tin Angel, the name of the 1993 re-release
