= Kim Anno =

Japanese-American abstract painter

- Born: December 19, 1958 (age 67); Los Angeles, California, United States
- Education: San Francisco State University; San Francisco Art Institute
- Occupations: Visual artist, educator
- Known for: Abstract painting, photography, filmmaking
- Website: kimanno.com

Kim Anno (born December 19, 1958) is a Japanese-American artist and educator. She is known for her work as an abstract painter, photographer, and filmmaker. Anno has served as a professor, and as the chair of the painting department at the California College of the Arts in San Francisco.

== Early life and education ==
Kim Anno was born in Los Angeles, California to Japanese-Polish and Native American-Irish parents. She was raised next to the ocean on the west side of Los Angeles and came of age in the political flux of the 1970s. Anno’s father was a beatnik physicist and her mother a nurse and civil rights activist brought her to speeches by Martin Luther King and Bobby Kennedy where she was embedded in the "social upheaval and personal liberation" of the time. Anno was inspired by these activist mass gatherings, "whether cultural, like folk or rock-n-roll festivals, or political, such as the Chicano moratorium, Cambodian bombing protests, or the UFW’s Gallo boycott." Near by Dogtown Z boys were "inventing skateboarding" with Jeff Ho’s surf shop gang and Peggy Oki, LA’s feminist and conceptual art movement was in full swing, as was the beginning of the punk scene by the 80s, "the electricity of the time ignited [Anno's] creativity, it’s the current running through [her] work all the way to the present."

Anno studied at San Francisco State University, earning a Bachelor of Fine Arts in 1982. She was awarded a Master of Fine Arts degree in 1985 from the San Francisco Art Institute.

Anno began working at the California College of the Arts in 1996 as an associate professor, and was chair of the painting department as of 2012.

== Influences ==
Anno works with a philosophy centered on expanding the function of art in society. Perhaps this credo began in her studies while attending the radical, non-accredited, women's art school, the Feminist Studio Workshop, in downtown Los Angeles. There she was influenced by the work of the graphic designer Sheila Levrant de Bretteville, and interdisciplinary artist Suzanne Lacy, both part of the Feminist art movement in the United States.

Some of Anno's prominent artistic themes include ecology and climate change, the "joy and consequences of technology", and "the language of abstraction as it appears in religious and ritual art". Working on wood, aluminum and canvass surfaces, Anno has pushed her painting practice to explore the limits of abstraction. Through abstraction, she invites viewers to become participants in her work by allowing their own experiences and ideas to inform their interpretation of her work. Her work shifted in 2008 when she allowed narrative into her process, revealing her interest in film and leading to her current interdisciplinary practice. Since then she has applied her painterly mark to working in short film and video installations, and has made several series of large-format photographs. Filmmaking and photography opened an entirely new horizon to reach a different, younger audience.

== Career ==
In her early career, Anno painted public murals. Anno has participated in numerous exhibitions, including Don’t Panic at the 2011 United Nations Climate Change Convention, Men and Women in Water Cities at the 2012 Convention, exhibitions at the Berkeley Art Museum and Pacific Film Archive, and Museum of Modern Art, Rio de Janeiro, and Women On the Silk Road, which travelled along the Silk Road network featuring artists influenced by Asian art and culture.

She has been awarded the Wallace Alexander Gerbode Foundation Purchase Award, the Fleishhaker Fellowship, and further fellowships from the Open Circle Foundation and the Berkeley Film Foundation.

=== Commissions ===
Anno has received commissions by UC Davis (1991), the San Francisco Arts Commission, and the City of Oakland Public Arts Commission. From 2010 to 2012 the Zellerbach Foundation and the SFMOMA Phillis Moldaw, commissioned Anno for new work. From 2007 to 2014 poet Anne Carson and Anno collaborated on a series of three limited edition artist’s books commissioned by Benedict’s/ St. John’s University One Crow Press: Sleep (2007); The Mirror of Simple Souls (2003); and The Albertine Workout (2014).

=== Teaching ===
- 1996-Current California College of Arts and Crafts, Associate Professor, Painting
- 1995-96 University of California, Berkeley, Painting, Drawing
- 1994-95 Stanford University, Visiting Lecturer, Painting/Drawing
- 1993-96 San Francisco Art Institute, Visiting Artist, Painting
- 1994 California State University, Hayward, Lecturer, Painting
- 1992–1994, University of California, Berkeley, visiting lecturer in painting, drawing, and design
- 1991 Louisiana State University, Assistant Professor, Painting and Drawing
- 1990-91 California College of Arts and Crafts, Lecturer, Design
- 1989-90 Ohio State University, Lecturer, Painting and Drawing
- 1987-89 Instructor, Cabrillo College, Aptos, CA Color and Design
- 1986-85 Instructor, Napa Valley College, Napa, CA Painting and Drawing

== Bibliography ==
=== Non-fiction books and catalogues ===
- 2012 “Don’t Panic” catalogue, Durban Municipal Gallery
- Hallmark, Kara Kelley (2007). Encyclopedia of Asian American Artists. Greenwood Publishing Group. ISBN 978-0313334511.
- 2007-08 "Sleep", Limited edition Artist’s Book, One Crow Press St. John’s University by Anne Carson and Kim Anno
- 2010 “Intimate Nature” Berkeley Art Center
- 2009 “Liquescent” solo exhibition, Patricia Sweetow Gallery
- 2005 Paint On Metal, Tucson Art Museum
- 2005 Fleishhaker Foundation, Eureka Fellowship Award, Berkeley Art Museum
- 2004 U.S. Art in Embassies, Vientienne Embassy in Laos
- 1999 Orange County Museum of Art Biennial
- 1999 Crossings: 14 Bay Area Asian Artists by Jeff Kelley, curator, Asian Art Museum
- 1999 Practice and Process: Painterly Abstraction in California
- 1996 Parallaxis Western States Arts Federation Awards in Visual Arts
- 1996 The Exchange Show: Twelve Painters From San Francisco and Rio de Janeiro
- 1996 "Content: Contemporary Issues" Palo Alto Cultural Center
- 1986 Druckgrafik, An Exhibition of American and German Printmakers

=== Articles ===
- “Que(e)rying Contemporary Asian American Art” book chapter interview, photograph by Laura Kina, and Jan Christian Bernabe (2015)
- Beltrans, JD. “Painting Expelled” Huffington Post review and photograph of painting (2015)
- Photographs, The Albertine Work Out, article, Atlanta Celebrates Photography Blog (2014)
- Interview, Photograph, Sierra Magazine Sept-Oct issue (2014)
- “Signs” Cover Photograph, University of Rutgers, Journal of Women, Culture and Society (2014)
- Review, “Water City Berkeley”, by John Zarobell, Art Practical (2014)
- Искусство (The Art Magazine) in Moscow, Russia, Anno interview, photographs (2013)
- Interview, with John Zarobell, podcast, Vimeo, University of San Francisco (2013)
- 7×7 Magazine, photograph, Ouroboros exhibition, San Francisco (2013)
- Albertine’s Work Out, artists’s book by Anne Carson, Kim Anno published by St. Benedict’s Literary Institute, Minnesota (2013)
- VIZ, Journal of Arts and Critical Studies, University of California, Santa Cruz color photographs (2011)
- Podcast Interview, “Bad At Sports” with Bruno Fazzolari, Art Practical (2012)
- Anno, Kim. Motherhood & Philosophy, “Lesbians mothering an Intensely Masculine Son”, edited by Sheila Lintott, Wiley-Blackwell Publishers (2010)
- Hanford Sentinel, photo, interview, article King’s Art Center Anno Retrospective (2009)
- Eco-Artspace Journal, “Rising Tide: the Arts and Ecological Ethics Conference Kelley, Kara (ed). Twentieth Century Asian American Artists’ Encyclopedia, Greenwood Press (2007)
- Art in America, citation (2006) Artweek, August, “Perimeters of Narrative” (2006)
- Swanhuyser, Hiya. “Perimeters of Narrative” San Francisco Weekly, (June 15, 2006)
- Helfand, Glen. “Perimeters of Narrative” Art Forum, Critics Picks (2006)
- Baker, Kenneth. review, photograph, San Francisco Chronicle, (November 12, 2005)
- Baker, Kenneth. SF Gate. Com, photograph, review, (2005)
- “Paint On Metal” interview, photograph, published by the Tucson Museum of Art (2005)
- Baker, Kenneth. “photograph review,” San Francisco Chronicle, (June 12, 2004)
- Ann Arbor News, Michigan (April 2004) Art Week, review, photography, Sweetow Gallery, (September 2004)
- Baker, Kenneth. “review” San Francisco Chronicle, (April 5, 2004)
- Ford, Dave. “Art and History..” San Francisco Chronicle, (November 1, 2004)
