= History of HIV/AIDS =

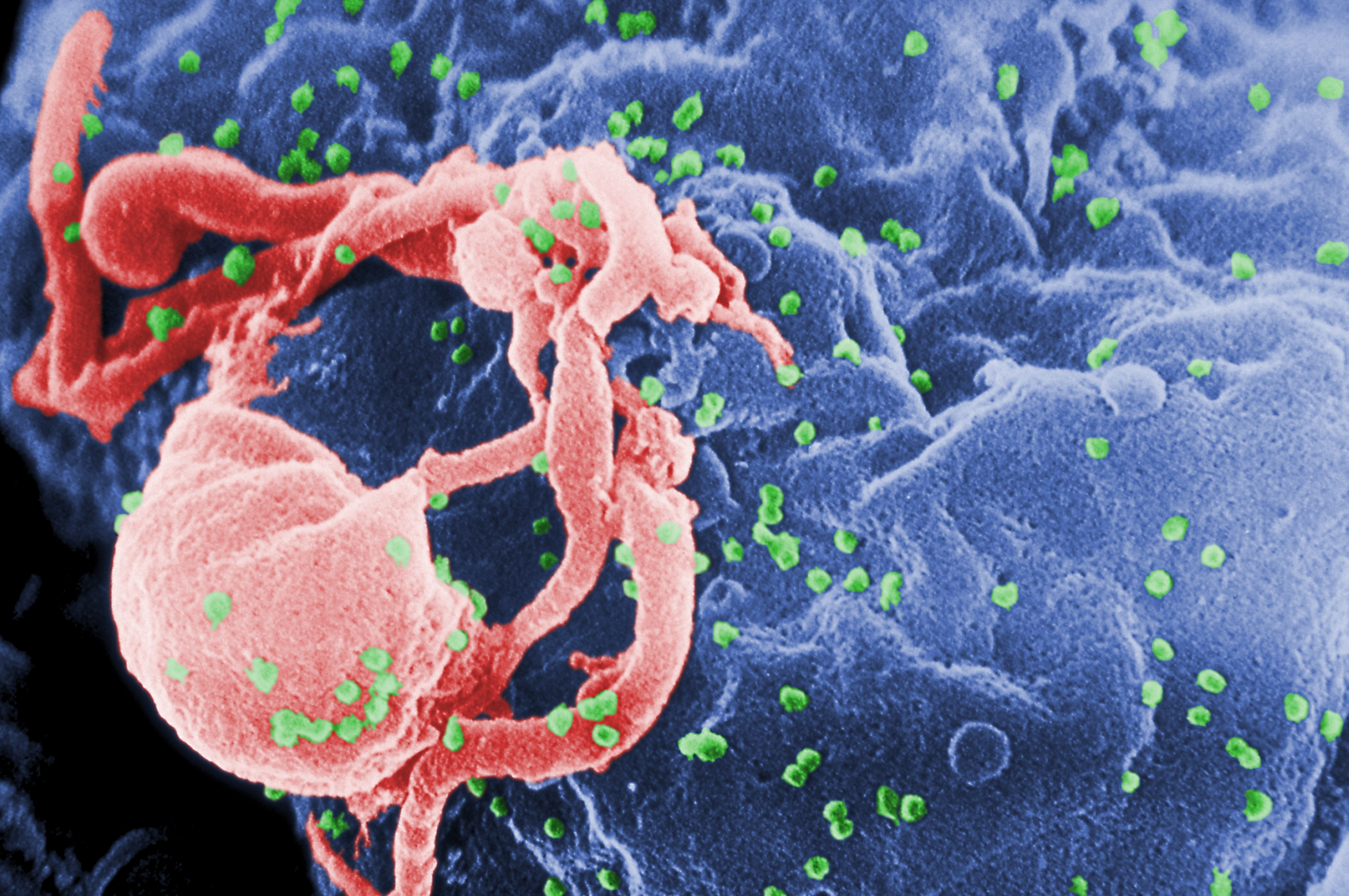
False-color scanning electron micrograph of HIV-1, in green, budding from cultured lymphocyte

AIDS is caused by a human immunodeficiency virus (HIV), which originated in non-human primates in Central and West Africa. While various sub-groups of the virus acquired human infectivity at different times, the present pandemic had its origins in the emergence of one specific strain – HIV-1 subgroup M – in Léopoldville in the Belgian Congo (now Kinshasa in the Democratic Republic of the Congo) in the 1920s.

There are two types of HIV: HIV-1 and HIV-2. HIV-1 is more virulent, more easily transmitted, and the cause of the vast majority of HIV infections globally. The pandemic strain of HIV-1 is closely related to a virus found in chimpanzees of the subspecies Pan troglodytes troglodytes, which live in the forests of the Central African nations of Cameroon, Equatorial Guinea, Gabon, the Republic of the Congo, and the Central African Republic. HIV-2 is less transmissible and is largely confined to West Africa, along with its closest relative, a virus of the sooty mangabey (Cercocebus atys atys), an Old World monkey inhabiting southern Senegal, Guinea-Bissau, Guinea, Sierra Leone, Liberia, and western Ivory Coast.

== Cross-species transmission to humans ==
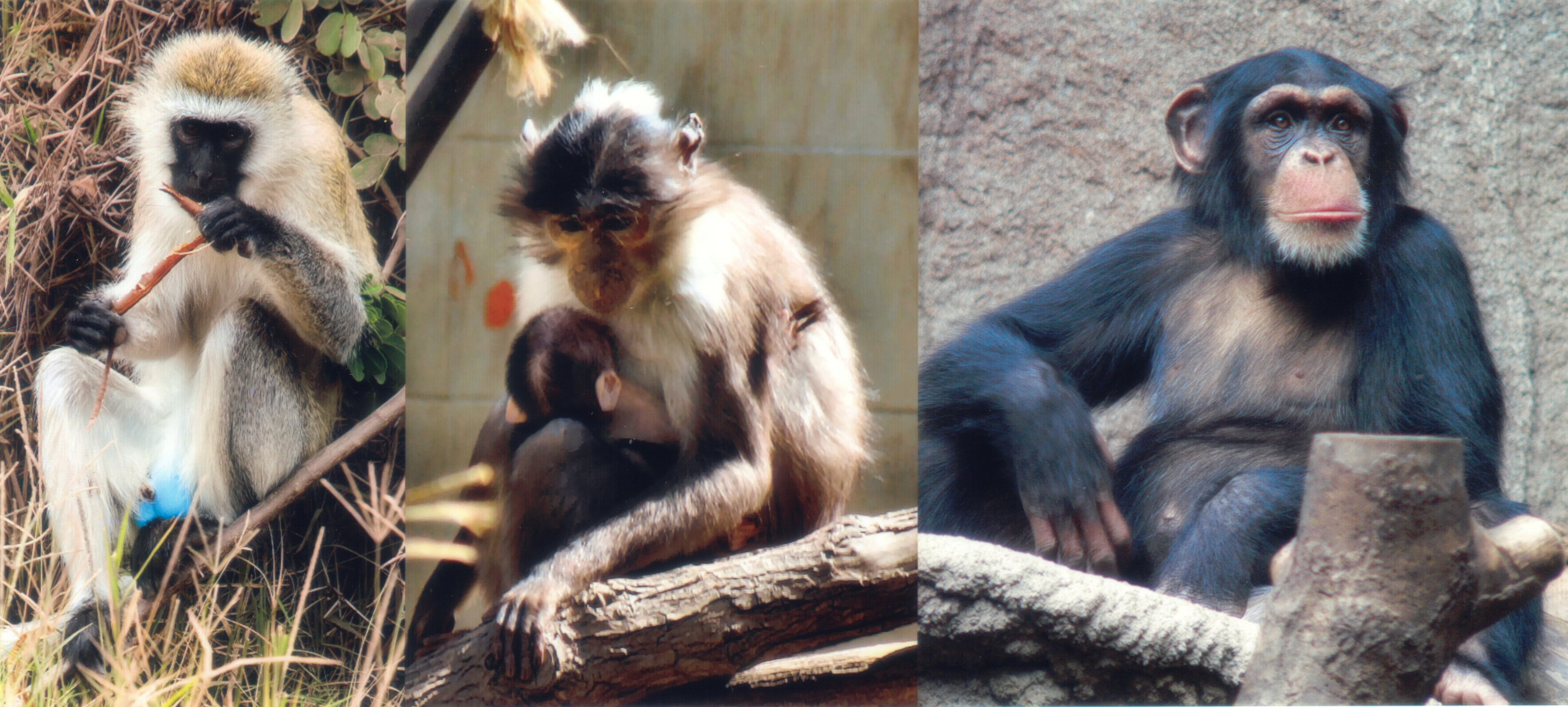
Left to right: the African green monkey, source of SIV; the sooty mangabey, source of HIV-2; and the chimpanzee, source of HIV-1

Research in this area is conducted using molecular phylogenetics, comparing viral genomic sequences to determine relatedness.

=== HIV-1 origins: from chimpanzees and gorillas ===
Scientists found that the closest relatives of HIV-1 are simian immunodeficiency viruses (SIVs) infecting wild-living chimpanzees and gorillas in West Central Africa. In particular, each of the known HIV-1 strains is either closely related to the SIV that infects the chimpanzee subspecies Pan troglodytes troglodytes (SIVcpz) or closely related to the SIV that infects western lowland gorillas, called SIVgor. The pandemic HIV-1 strain (group M or Main) and a rare strain found only in a few Cameroonian people (group N) are clearly derived from SIVcpz strains endemic in Pan troglodytes troglodytes chimpanzee populations living in Cameroon. Another very rare HIV-1 strain (group P) is clearly derived from SIVgor strains of Cameroon. Finally, the primate ancestor of HIV-1 group O, a strain infecting 100,000 people mostly from Cameroon but also from neighbouring countries, was confirmed in 2006 to be SIVgor. Based on this, scientists believe that Cameroon might be the initial location where HIV-1 transmitted from simians to humans. Later, through retrospective analysis of the co-prevalence of HIV-1 and genital ulcer disease in Africa, researchers speculated that the epicenter of the early HIV-1 epidemic could have been Kinshasa in the Democratic Republic of the Congo, further south than Cameroon, which was known as Léopoldville, Belgian Congo.

Using molecular clock and phylogenetic analysis methods, scientists have revealed the origins of HIV-1 group M and group O. The most recent common ancestor (MRCA) (that is, started to spread in the human population) of HIV-1 group M is around 1931 (1915 - 1941), while the MRCA of group O is estimated to be around 1920 (1890 - 1940). Another study amplified and analyzed HIV-1 sequences from a 1960 lymph node biopsy in Kinshasa, positioning it close to the ancestral node of subtype A and, through relaxed molecular clock analysis with another early sequence, dated the MRCA of HIV-1 group M to the early 20th century. Genetic recombination had earlier been thought to affect the accuracy of phylogenetic analysis, but subsequent studies have confirmed the reliability of this approach. However, due to the critically endangered status of primates, the sample sizes in existing studies are generally very small, making it nearly impossible to further utilize them for research on the origins of HIV.

=== HIV-2 origins: from sooty mangabeys ===
SIV of sooty mangabeys (SIVsmm) is believed to be the progenitor of HIV-2 and has been transmitted to humans on multiple occasions. A molecular epidemiological survey of SIVsmm in a community of approximately 120 free-ranging sooty mangabeys in the Taï Forest of Ivory Coast revealed that the two strains of HIV-2 (groups A and B) that spread widely in humans likely originated from this region.

There are six additional known HIV-2 groups, each having been found in just one person. They all seem to derive from independent transmissions from sooty mangabeys to humans. Groups C and D have been found in two people from Liberia, groups E and F have been discovered in two people from Sierra Leone, and groups G and H have been detected in two people from the Ivory Coast. These HIV-2 strains are probably infections of dead-end hosts, and each of them is most closely related to SIVsmm strains from sooty mangabeys living in the same country where the human infection was found.

HIV-2 groups A and B originated in the first half of the 20th century, with their MRCAs estimated at 1940 ± 16 and 1945 ± 14, respectively, stemming from zoonotic transmission of SIVsmm. The rapid epidemic expansion of HIV-2 subtype A in Guinea-Bissau began around 1955–1970, coinciding with sociocultural changes during the independence war (1963–1974), while the SIV common ancestor in sooty mangabeys (around 1809) suggests a cross-species transmission to humans occurred only a few hundred years before the HIV-2 outbreak.

=== Bushmeat practice ===
According to the natural transfer theory (also called "hunter theory" or "bushmeat theory"), the virus was transmitted from an ape or monkey to a human when a hunter was cut or otherwise injured while hunting or butchering an infected animal. The resulting exposure to blood or other bodily fluids of the animal can result in SIV infection. In rural Africa, due to food shortages, it is common to rely on bushmeat as a primary source of meat. Scientists believed that this situation may increase the probability of cross-species virus transmission. A study revealed that the more people come into contact with bushmeat, the higher their risk of SIV infection: the percentage of people showing seroreactivity to antigens—evidence of current or past SIV infection—was 2.3% among the general population of Cameroon, 7.8% in villages where bushmeat is hunted or used, and 17.1% in the most exposed people of these villages. However, the mechanism by which SIV evolved into HIV after crossing species to humans remains unclear.

== Emergence ==
=== Unresolved questions about HIV origins and emergence ===
The discovery of the main HIV/SIV phylogenetic relationships permits explaining broad HIV biogeography: the early centres of the HIV-1 groups were in Central Africa, where the primate reservoirs of the related SIVcpz and SIVgor viruses (chimpanzees and gorillas) exist; similarly, the HIV-2 groups had their centres in West Africa, where sooty mangabeys, which harbour the related SIVsmm virus, exist. However, these relationships do not explain more detailed patterns of biogeography, such as why epidemic HIV-2 groups (A and B) only evolved in the Ivory Coast, which is one of only six countries harbouring the sooty mangabey. It is also unclear why the SIVcpz endemic in the chimpanzee subspecies Pan troglodytes schweinfurthii (inhabiting the Democratic Republic of Congo, Central African Republic, Rwanda, Burundi, Uganda, and Tanzania) did not spawn an epidemic HIV-1 strain to humans, while the Democratic Republic of Congo was the main centre of HIV-1 group M, a virus descended from SIVcpz strains of a subspecies (Pan troglodytes troglodytes) that does not exist in this country. It is clear that the several HIV-1 and HIV-2 strains descend from SIVcpz, SIVgor, and SIVsmm viruses, and that bushmeat practice provides the most plausible cause of cross-species transfer to humans. However, some unanswered questions remain.

It is not yet explained why only four HIV groups (HIV-1 groups M and O, and HIV-2 groups A and B) spread considerably in human populations, despite bushmeat practices being widespread in Central and West Africa, and the resulting human SIV infections being common.

It also remains unexplained why all epidemic HIV groups emerged in humans nearly simultaneously, and only in the 20th century, despite very old human exposure to SIV (a 2010 phylogenetic study demonstrated that SIV is at least tens of thousands of years old).

=== Origin and epidemic emergence ===
Several of the theories of HIV origin accept the established knowledge of the HIV/SIV phylogenetic relationships, and also accept that bushmeat practice was the most likely cause of the initial transfer to humans. All of them propose that the simultaneous epidemic emergences of four HIV groups in the late 19th-early 20th century, and the lack of previous known emergences, are explained by new factor(s) that appeared in the relevant African regions in that timeframe. These new factor(s) would have acted either to increase human exposures to SIV, to help it to adapt to the human organism by mutation (thus enhancing its between-humans transmissibility), or to cause an initial burst of transmissions crossing an epidemiological threshold, and therefore increasing the probability of continued spread.

Genetic studies of the virus suggested in 2008 that the most recent common ancestor of the HIV-1 M group dates back to the Belgian Congo city of Léopoldville (modern Kinshasa), circa 1910. Proponents of this dating link the HIV epidemic with the emergence of colonialism and growth of large colonial African cities, leading to social changes, including a higher degree of non-monogamous sexual activity, the spread of prostitution, and the concomitant high frequency of genital ulcer diseases (such as syphilis) in nascent colonial cities.

In 2014, a study conducted by scientists from the University of Oxford and the University of Leuven, in Belgium, revealed that because approximately one million people every year would flow through the prominent city of Kinshasa, it might have served as the origin of the first suspected HIV cases in the 1920s. Kinshasa also experienced the earliest retroactive diagnosis of HIV, in the LEO70 sample, which was isolated from a preserved plasma sample of "an adult Bantu male" who also had a Sickle cell trait and G6PDD taken in 1959. It is also believed that passengers riding on the region's Belgian railway trains were able to spread the virus to larger areas, combining with the active sex trade, rapid population growth and unsterilized needles used in health clinics to create what became the African AIDS crisis.

==== Social changes and urbanization ====
Beatrice Hahn, Paul M. Sharp, and their colleagues proposed that "[the epidemic emergence of HIV] most likely reflects changes in population structure and behaviour in Africa during the 20th century and perhaps medical interventions that provided the opportunity for rapid human-to-human spread of the virus". After the Scramble for Africa started in the 1880s, European colonial powers established cities, towns, and other colonial stations. A largely masculine labor force was hastily recruited to work in fluvial and sea ports, railways, other infrastructures, and in plantations. This disrupted traditional tribal values and favored casual sexual activity with an increased number of partners. In the nascent cities women felt relatively liberated from rural tribal rules and many remained unmarried, this being rare in African traditional societies. This was accompanied by unprecedented increase in people's movements.

Michael Worobey and colleagues observed that the growth of cities probably played a role in the epidemic emergence of HIV, since the phylogenetic dating of the two older strains of HIV-1 (groups M and O), suggest that these viruses started to spread soon after the main Central African colonial cities were founded.

==== Colonialism in Africa ====
Amit Chitnis, Diana Rawls, and Jim Moore proposed that HIV may have emerged epidemically as a result of harsh conditions, forced labor, displacement, and unsafe injection and vaccination practices associated with colonialism, particularly in French Equatorial Africa. The workers in plantations, construction projects, and other colonial enterprises were supplied with bushmeat, which would have contributed to an increase in hunting and, it follows, a higher incidence of human exposure to SIV. Several historical sources support the view that bushmeat hunting indeed increased, both because of the necessity to supply workers and because firearms became more widely available.

The colonial authorities also gave many vaccinations against smallpox, and injections, of which many would be made without sterilising the equipment between uses. Chitnis et al. proposed that both these parenteral risks and the prostitution associated with forced labor camps could have caused serial transmission (or serial passage) of SIV between humans (see discussion of this in the next section). In addition, they proposed that the conditions of extreme stress associated with forced labor could depress the immune system of workers, therefore prolonging the primary acute infection period of someone newly infected by SIV, thus increasing the odds of both adaptation of the virus to humans, and of further transmissions.

The authors proposed that HIV-1 originated in the area of French Equatorial Africa in the early 20th century (when the colonial abuses and forced labor were at their peak). Later research established that these theories were mostly correct: HIV-1 groups M and O started to spread in humans in late 19th–early 20th century. In addition, all groups of HIV-1 descend from either SIVcpz or SIVgor from apes living to the west of the Ubangi River, either in countries that belonged to the French Equatorial Africa federation of colonies, in Equatorial Guinea (then a Spanish colony), or in Cameroon (which was a German colony between 1884 and 1916, and then fell to Allied forces in World War I, and had most of its area administered by France, in close association with French Equatorial Africa).

This theory was later dubbed "Heart of Darkness" by Jim Moore, alluding to the book of the same title written by Joseph Conrad, the main focus of which is colonial abuses in equatorial Africa.

==== Unsterile injections ====
In several articles published since 2001, Preston Marx, Philip Alcabes, and Ernest Drucker proposed that HIV emerged because of rapid serial human-to-human transmission of SIV (after a bushmeat hunter or handler became SIV-infected) through unsafe or unsterile injections. Although both Chitnis et al. and Sharp et al. also suggested that this may have been one of the major risk factors at play in HIV emergence (see above), Marx et al. enunciated the underlying mechanisms in greater detail, and wrote the first review of the injection campaigns made in colonial Africa.

Central to the Marx et al. argument is the concept of adaptation by serial passage (or serial transmission): an adventitious virus (or other pathogen) can increase its biological adaptation to a new host species if it is rapidly transmitted between hosts, while each host is still in the acute infection period. This process favors the accumulation of adaptive mutations more rapidly, therefore increasing the odds that a better adapted viral variant will appear in the host before the immune system suppresses the virus. Such better adapted variants could then survive in the human host for longer than the short acute infection period, in high numbers (high viral load), which would grant it more possibilities of epidemic spread.

Marx et al. reported experiments of cross-species transfer of SIV in captive monkeys (some of which made by themselves), in which the use of serial passage helped to adapt SIV to the new monkey species after passage by three or four animals.

In agreement with this model is also the fact that, while both HIV-1 and HIV-2 attain substantial viral loads in the human organism, adventitious SIV infecting humans seldom does so: people with SIV antibodies often have very low or even undetectable SIV viral load. This suggests that both HIV-1 and HIV-2 are adapted to humans, and serial passage could have been the process responsible for it.

Marx et al. proposed that unsterile injections (that is, injections where the needle or syringe is reused without sterilization or cleaning between uses), which were likely very prevalent in Africa, during both the colonial period and afterwards, provided the mechanism of serial passage that permitted HIV to adapt to humans, therefore explaining why it emerged epidemically only in the 20th century.

==== Massive injections of the antibiotic era ====
Marx et al. emphasize the massive number of injections administered in Africa after antibiotics were introduced (around 1950) as being the most likely implicated in the origin of HIV because, by these times (roughly in the period 1950 to 1970), injection intensity in Africa was maximal. They argued that a serial passage chain of three or four transmissions between humans is an unlikely event (the probability of transmission after a needle reuse is something between 0.3% and 2%, and only a few people have an acute SIV infection at any time), and so HIV emergence may have required the very high frequency of injections of the antibiotic era.

The molecular dating studies place the initial spread of the epidemic HIV groups before that time (see above). According to Marx et al., these studies could have overestimated the age of the HIV groups, because they depend on a molecular clock assumption, may not have accounted for the effects of natural selection in the viruses, and the serial passage process alone would be associated with strong natural selection.

==== Injection campaigns against sleeping sickness ====
David Gisselquist proposed that the mass injection campaigns to treat trypanosomiasis (sleeping sickness) in Central Africa were responsible for the emergence of HIV-1. Unlike Marx et al., Gisselquist argued that the millions of unsafe injections administered during these campaigns were sufficient to spread rare HIV infections into an epidemic, and that evolution of HIV through serial passage was not essential to the emergence of the HIV epidemic in the 20th century.

This theory focuses on injection campaigns that peaked in the period 1910–40, that is, around the time the HIV-1 groups started to spread. It also focuses on the fact that many of the injections in these campaigns were intravenous (which are more likely to transmit SIV/HIV than subcutaneous or intramuscular injections), and many of the patients received many (often more than 10) injections per year, therefore increasing the odds of SIV serial passage.

==== Other early injection campaigns ====
Jacques Pépin and Annie-Claude Labbé reviewed the colonial health reports of Cameroon and French Equatorial Africa for the period 1921–59, calculating the incidences of the diseases requiring intravenous injections. They concluded that trypanosomiasis, leprosy, yaws, and syphilis were responsible for most intravenous injections. Schistosomiasis, tuberculosis, and vaccinations against smallpox represented lower parenteral risks: schistosomiasis cases were relatively few; tuberculosis patients only became numerous after mid-century; and there were few smallpox vaccinations in the lifetime of each person.

The authors suggested that the very high prevalence of the Hepatitis C virus in southern Cameroon and forested areas of French Equatorial Africa (around 40–50%) can be better explained by the unsterile injections used to treat yaws, because this disease was much more prevalent than syphilis, trypanosomiasis, and leprosy in these areas. They suggested that all these parenteral risks caused not only the massive spread of Hepatitis C but also the spread of other pathogens, and the emergence of HIV-1: "the same procedures could have exponentially amplified HIV-1, from a single hunter/cook occupationally infected with SIVcpz to several thousand patients treated with arsenicals or other drugs, a threshold beyond which sexual transmission could prosper." They do not suggest specifically serial passage as the mechanism of adaptation.

According to Pépin's 2011 book, The Origins of AIDS, the virus can be traced to a central African bush hunter in 1921, with colonial medical campaigns using improperly sterilized syringe and needles playing a key role in enabling a future epidemic. Pépin concludes that AIDS spread silently in Africa for decades, fueled by urbanization and prostitution since the initial cross-species infection. Pépin also claims that the virus was brought to the Americas by a Haitian teacher returning home from Zaire in the 1960s. Sex tourism and contaminated blood transfusion centers ultimately propelled AIDS to public consciousness in the 1980s and a worldwide pandemic.

==== Genital ulcer diseases and evolution of sexual activity ====
João Dinis de Sousa, Viktor Müller, Philippe Lemey, and Anne-Mieke Vandamme proposed that HIV became epidemic through sexual serial transmission, in nascent colonial cities, helped by a high frequency of genital ulcers, caused by genital ulcer diseases (GUD). GUD are simply sexually transmitted diseases that cause genital ulcers; examples are syphilis, chancroid, lymphogranuloma venereum, and genital herpes. These diseases increase the probability of HIV transmission dramatically, from around 0.01–0.1% to 4–43% per heterosexual act, because the genital ulcers provide a portal of viral entry, and contain many activated T cells expressing the CCR5 co-receptor, the main cell targets of HIV.

==== Probable time interval of cross-species transfer ====
Sousa et al. use molecular dating techniques to estimate the time when each HIV group split from its closest SIV lineage. Each HIV group necessarily crossed to humans between this time and the time when it started to spread (the time of the MRCA), because after the MRCA certainly all lineages were already in humans, and before the split with the closest simian strain, the lineage was in a simian. HIV-1 groups M and O split from their closest SIVs around 1931 and 1915, respectively. This information, together with the datations of the HIV groups' MRCAs, mean that all HIV groups likely crossed to humans in the early 20th century.

==== Strong genital ulcer disease incidence in nascent colonial cities ====
The authors reviewed colonial medical articles and archived medical reports of the countries at or near the ranges of chimpanzees, gorillas and sooty mangabeys, and found that genital ulcer diseases (GUDs) peaked in the colonial cities during their early growth period (up to 1935). The colonial authorities recruited men to work in railways, fluvial and sea ports, and other infrastructure projects, and most of these men did not bring their wives with them. Then, the highly male-biased sex ratio favoured prostitution, which in its turn caused an explosion of GUD (especially syphilis and chancroid). After the mid-1930s, people's movements were more tightly controlled, and mass surveys and treatments (of arsenicals and other drugs) were organized, and so the GUD incidences started to decline. They declined even further after World War II, because of the heavy use of antibiotics, so that, by the late 1950s, Léopoldville (which is the probable center of HIV-1 group M) had a very low GUD incidence. Similar processes happened in the cities of Cameroon and Ivory Coast, where HIV-1 group O and HIV-2 respectively evolved.

Therefore, the peak GUD incidences in cities have a good temporal coincidence with the period when all main HIV groups crossed to humans and started to spread. In addition, the authors gathered evidence that syphilis and the other GUDs were, like injections, absent from the densely forested areas of Central and West Africa before organized colonialism socially disrupted these areas (starting in the 1880s). Thus, this theory also potentially explains why HIV emerged only after the late 19th century.

==== Female genital mutilation ====
Uli Linke has argued that the practice of female genital mutilation (either or both of clitoridectomy and infibulation) is responsible for the high incidence of AIDS in Africa, since intercourse with a female who has undergone clitoridectomy is conducive to exchange of blood.

==== Male circumcision distribution and HIV origins ====
Male circumcision reduces the risk of HIV transmission (see Circumcision and HIV). Leaving aside blood transfusions, the highest HIV-1 transmissibility ever measured was from female prostitutes with 85% prevalence of HIV to uncircumcised men with GUD; 43% contracted HIV-1 after a single sexual exposure. There was no seroconversion in the absence of male GUD. Sousa et al. reasoned that the adaptation and epidemic emergence of each HIV group may have required such extreme conditions, and thus reviewed the existing ethnographic literature for patterns of male circumcision and hunting of apes and monkeys for bushmeat, focusing on the period 1880–1960, and on most of the 318 ethnic groups living in Central and West Africa. They also collected censuses and other literature showing the ethnic composition of colonial cities in this period. Then, they estimated the circumcision frequencies of the Central African cities over time.

Sousa et al. charts reveal that male circumcision frequencies were much lower in several cities of western and central Africa in the early 20th century than they are currently. The reason is that many ethnic groups not performing circumcision by that time gradually adopted it, to imitate other ethnic groups and enhance the social acceptance of their boys (colonialism produced massive intermixing between African ethnic groups). About 15–30% of men in Léopoldville and Douala in the early 20th century should be uncircumcised, and these cities were the probable centers of HIV-1 groups M and O, respectively.

The authors studied early circumcision frequencies in 12 cities of Central and West Africa, to test if this variable correlated with HIV emergence. This correlation was strong for HIV-2: among 6 West African cities that could have received immigrants infected with SIVsmm, the two cities from the Ivory Coast studied (Abidjan and Bouaké) had much higher frequency of uncircumcised men (60–85%) than the others, and epidemic HIV-2 groups emerged initially in this country only. This correlation was less clear for HIV-1 in Central Africa.

HIV and other infections can spread from person to person via the use of improper and unsanitary tools during circumcision and female genital mutilation. Some Bukusu communities in Kenya have ceased circumcision because of a belief that the traditional form of the ritual can spread HIV.

==== Computer simulations of HIV emergence ====
Sousa et al. then built computer simulations to test if an 'ill-adapted SIV' (meaning a simian immunodeficiency virus already infecting a human but incapable of transmission beyond the short acute infection period) could spread in colonial cities. The simulations used parameters of sexual transmission obtained from the current HIV literature. They modelled people's 'sexual links', with different levels of sexual partner change among different categories of people (prostitutes, single women with several partners a year, married women, and men), according to data obtained from modern studies of sexual activity in African cities. The simulations let the parameters (city size, proportion of people married, GUD frequency, male circumcision frequency, and transmission parameters) vary, and explored several scenarios. Each scenario was run 1,000 times, to test the probability of SIV generating long chains of sexual transmission. The authors postulated that such long chains of sexual transmission were necessary for the SIV strain to adapt better to humans, becoming an HIV capable of further epidemic emergence.

The main result was that genital ulcer frequency was by far the most decisive factor. For the GUD levels prevailing in Léopoldville in the early 20th century, long chains of SIV transmission had a high probability. For the lower GUD levels existing in the same city in the late 1950s (see above), they were much less likely. And without GUD (a situation typical of villages in forested equatorial Africa before colonialism) SIV could not spread at all. City size was not an important factor. The authors propose that these findings explain the temporal patterns of HIV emergence: no HIV emerging in tens of thousands of years of human slaughtering of apes and monkeys, several HIV groups emerging in the nascent, GUD-riddled, colonial cities, and no epidemically successful HIV group emerging in mid-20th century, when GUD was more controlled, and cities were much bigger.

Male circumcision had little to moderate effect in their simulations, but, given the geographical correlation found, the authors propose that it could have had an indirect role, either by increasing genital ulcer disease itself (it is known that syphilis, chancroid, and several other GUDs have higher incidences in uncircumcised men), or by permitting further spread of the HIV strain, after the first chains of sexual transmission permitted adaptation to the human organism.

One of the main advantages of this theory is stressed by the authors: "It [the theory] also offers a conceptual simplicity because it proposes as causal factors for SIV adaptation to humans and initial spread the very same factors that most promote the continued spread of HIV nowadays: promiscuous [sic] sex, particularly involving sex workers, GUD, and possibly lack of circumcision."

==== Iatrogenic and other theories ====
Iatrogenic theories propose that medical interventions were responsible for HIV origins. By proposing factors that only appeared in Central and West Africa after the late 19th century, they seek to explain why all HIV groups also started after that.

The theories centred on the role of parenteral risks, such as unsterile injections, transfusions, or smallpox vaccinations are accepted as plausible by most scientists of the field.

Discredited HIV/AIDS origins theories include several iatrogenic theories, such as the polio vaccine hypothesis which argues that the early oral polio vaccines were contaminated with a chimpanzee virus, leading to the Central African outbreak.

== Pathogenicity of SIV in non-human primates ==
In most non-human primate species, natural SIV infection does not cause a fatal disease (but see below). Comparison of the gene sequence of SIV with HIV should, therefore, provide information about the factors necessary to cause disease in humans. The factors that determine the virulence of HIV as compared to most SIVs are only now being elucidated. Non-human SIVs contain a nef gene that down-regulates CD3, CD4, and MHC class I expression; most non-human SIVs, therefore, do not induce immunodeficiency; the HIV-1 nef gene, however, has lost its ability to down-regulate CD3, which results in the immune activation and apoptosis that is characteristic of chronic HIV infection.

In addition, a long-term survey of chimpanzees naturally infected with SIVcpz in Gombe National Park, Tanzania found that, contrary to the previous paradigm, chimpanzees with SIVcpz infection do experience an increased mortality, and also suffer from a human AIDS-like illness. SIV pathogenicity in wild animals could exist in other chimpanzee subspecies and other primate species as well, and stay unrecognized by lack of relevant long term studies.

== History of spread ==
=== 1959: David Carr (disputed) ===
David Carr was an apprentice printer (mistakenly referred to as the "Manchester sailor" when anonymized; Carr had served in the Navy between 1955 and 1957) from Manchester, England who died on August 31, 1959. Following the failure of his immune system, he succumbed to pneumonia. Doctors, baffled by what he had died from, preserved 50 of his tissue samples for inspection. In 1990, the tissues were found to be HIV-positive. However, in 1992, a second test by AIDS researcher David Ho found that the strain of HIV present in the tissues was similar to those found in 1990 rather than an earlier strain (which would have mutated considerably over the course of 30 years). He concluded that the DNA samples provided actually came from another patient with AIDS. Upon retesting David Carr's tissues, he found no sign of the virus.

=== 1959: Congolese man ===
One of the earliest documented HIV-1 infections was discovered in a preserved blood sample taken in 1959 from a man from Léopoldville in the Belgian Congo. However, it is unknown whether this anonymous person ever developed AIDS and died of its complications.

=== 1960: Congolese woman ===
A second early documented HIV-1 infection was discovered in a preserved lymph node biopsy sample taken in 1960 from a woman from Léopoldville, Belgian Congo.

=== 1966: Congolese man ===
A strain with a large amount of the genetic material present was dated to 1966 from a sample from a 38-year-old man.

=== 1969: Robert Rayford ===
In May 1969, 16-year-old African-American Robert Rayford died at the St. Louis City Hospital from Kaposi's sarcoma. In 1987 researchers at Tulane University School of Medicine detected a virus closely related or identical to HIV-1 in his preserved blood and tissues. The doctors who worked on his case at the time suspected he had engaged in sex work or was the victim of sexual abuse, though the patient did not discuss his sexual history with them in detail.

=== 1973: Ugandan children ===
From 1972 to 1973, researchers drew blood from 75 children in Uganda to serve as controls for a study of Burkitt's lymphoma. In 1985, retroactive testing of the frozen blood serum indicated that antibodies to a virus related to HIV were present in 50 (67%) of the children.

=== 1976: Arvid Noe ===
In 1975 and 1976, a Norwegian sailor, with the alias name Arvid Noe, his wife, and his seven-year-old daughter died of AIDS. The sailor had first presented symptoms in 1969, eight years after he first spent time in ports along the West African coastline. A gonorrhea infection during his first African voyage shows he was sexually active at this time. Tissue samples from the sailor and his wife were tested in 1988 and found to contain HIV-1 (Group O).

=== 1977: Grethe Rask ===
Grethe Rask was a Danish surgeon who traveled to Zaire in 1964 then again in 1972 to aid the sick. She was likely directly exposed to blood from many Congolese patients, one of whom infected her. She became unwell in 1974, then returned to Denmark in 1977, with her colleagues baffled by her symptoms. She died of pneumocystis pneumonia in December 1977. Her tissues were examined and tested by her colleagues and found positive in 1987.

=== Spread to the Western Hemisphere ===
HIV-1 strains were once thought to have arrived in New York City from Haiti around 1971. It spread from New York City to San Francisco around 1976.

HIV-1 is believed to have arrived in Haiti from central Africa, possibly from the Democratic Republic of the Congo around 1967. The current consensus is that HIV was introduced to Haiti by an unknown individual or individuals who contracted it while working in the Democratic Republic of the Congo circa 1966. A mini-epidemic followed, and circa 1969, yet another unknown individual took HIV from Haiti to the United States. The vast majority of cases of AIDS outside sub-Saharan Africa can be traced back to that single patient. In 1971, Miami based Joseph B. Gorinstein’s Hemo-Caribbean began exporting plasma from Port-au-Prince to USA and Europe. This was done in part with Luckner Cambronne, a high-ranking political figure in the islands’ regime and by exploiting an already vulnerable population. At its peak, Hemo Caribbean (later Life Services of Haiti) was exporting up to 6,000 litres of plasma to the United States a month. While the donors and plasma were reportedly tested for hepatitis, venereal disease and malaria, in 1972 HIV had neither been identified nor tested for in donated plasma or blood. Jacques Pépin in The Origins of Aids states that pre-donation checks were often missed, self-reported or incorrectly reported and theorises that re-using tubing for plasmapheresis in such centres caused an exponential transmission of infection between donors. However, there has been no way of testing an association between infections in donors and recipients with the window to test both having long closed. Later, numerous unrelated incidents of AIDS among Haitian immigrants to the U.S. were recorded in the early 1980s. Also, as evidenced by the case of Robert Rayford, isolated occurrences of this infection may have been emerging as early as 1966. The virus eventually entered gay male communities in large United States cities, where a combination of casual, multi-partner sexual activity (with individuals reportedly averaging over 11 unprotected sexual partners per year) and relatively high transmission rates associated with anal intercourse allowed it to spread explosively enough to finally be noticed.

Because of the long incubation period of HIV (up to a decade or longer) before symptoms of AIDS appear, and because of the initially low incidence, HIV was not noticed at first. By the time the first reported cases of AIDS were found in large United States cities, the prevalence of HIV infection in some communities had passed 5%. Worldwide, HIV infection has spread from urban to rural areas, and has appeared in regions such as China and India.

=== Canadian flight attendant theory ===
A Canadian airline steward named Gaëtan Dugas was referred to as "Case 057" and later "Patient O" with the alphabet letter "O" standing for "outside Southern California", in an early AIDS study by Dr. William Darrow of the Centers for Disease Control. Because of this, many people had considered Dugas to be responsible for taking HIV to North America. However, HIV reached New York City around 1971 while Dugas did not start work at Air Canada until 1974. In Randy Shilts' 1987 book And the Band Played On (and the 1993 film based on it), Dugas is referred to as AIDS's Patient Zero instead of "Patient O", but neither the book nor the movie states that he had been the first to bring the virus to North America. He was incorrectly called "Patient Zero" because at least 40 of the 248 people known to be infected by HIV in 1983 had had sex with him, or with a person who had sexual intercourse with Dugas.

=== Homeless people and intravenous drug users in New York ===
A volunteer social worker called Betty Williams, a Quaker who worked with the homeless in New York from the seventies and early eighties onwards, has talked about people at that time whose death would be labelled as "junkie flu" or "the dwindles". In an interview for the Act Up Oral History Project in 2008, she said: "Of course, the horror stories came, mainly concerning women who were injection-drug users ... who had PCP pneumonia (Pneumocystis pneumonia), and were told that they just had bronchitis." She continues: "I actually believe that AIDS kind of existed among this group of people first, because if you look back, there was something called junkie pneumonia, there was something called the dwindles that addicts got, and I think this was another early AIDS population way too helpless to ever do anything for themselves on their own behalf."

Julia Epstein writes in her book Altered Conditions: Disease, Medicine and Storytelling that: "As we uncover more of the early history of HIV infection, it becomes clear that by at least the 1970s the virus was already making major inroads into the immune systems of a number of diverse populations in the United States (the retrospectively diagnosed epidemic of 'junkie pneumonia' in New York City in the late 1970s for example) and had for some time been causing devastation in several countries in Africa."

Anecdotal evidence suggests that so-called junkie pneumonia first began to afflict heroin addicts in New York in 1977. In her book EnGendering AIDS: Deconstructing Sex, Text, and Epidemic, Tamsin Wilton writes: "People had been sickening and dying of mysterious conditions since the early 1970s, conditions that we can retrospectively diagnose as AIDS related. There was, for example, a phenomenon known as 'junkie pneumonia' which spread among some populations of injecting street drug users in the 1970s, and which is now believed to have been caused by HIV infection."

Melinda Cooper writes in her book Family Values: Between Neoliberalism and the New Social Conservatism: "It is plausible that these cases [of AIDS] did not come to light in the 1970s for the same reason that 'junkie pneumonia' was not recognized as the sign of an emerging infectious disease: The people in question had such precarious access to health care that news of their death was never communicated to public health authorities."

An article by Pattrice Maurer in the newspaper Agenda from April 1992 explores some of the issues surrounding junkie pneumonia. It starts: "In the late 1970s while the epidemic known as 'disco fever' swept through the U.S., an epidemic known as 'junkie pneumonia' raged among injection drug users in New York City." It continues: "Few people were aware that large numbers of [intravenous] drug users were inexplicably dying of pneumonia. Those few who did notice these deaths did not feel compelled to investigate the public health puzzle they posed." The author's opinion is that if anyone had bothered to investigate these deaths, they would have found an immune system disorder that is now called AIDS.

Steven Thrasher writes in The Guardian: "Indeed, those of us who study AIDS have long known that long before common symptoms such as Kaposi sarcoma and pneumonia were showing up among hemophiliacs and gay men, they were likely affecting homeless people who lived off society's radar, people who used IV (intravenous) drugs and those who avoided medical treatment out of fear."

A chapter in The Proceedings of the World Conference of Therapeutic Communities (9th, San Francisco, California, September 1–6, 1985) gives details about serum samples that were tested for signs of HIV (then called HTLV-III/LAV) antibodies. Quoting: "We have also conducted historical studies of the epidemic in New York City, using serum samples that were originally collected for other purposes. We have sera from IV drug users that go back to the middle 1960s. The first indication of HTLV-III/LAV antibody presence is in one of eleven samples from 1978 ... 29% of 40 samples in 1979 ... 44% of samples from 1980 and 52% of samples from 1982. The HTLV-III/LAV virus appears to have been introduced among IV drug users in the late 1970s in New York City."

In an article published in AIDS: Cultural Analysis/Cultural Activism, author Douglas Crimp draws attention to anecdotal evidence about junkie pneumonia. Quoting: "Even these statistics are based on CDC epidemiology that continues to see the beginning of the epidemic as 1981 ... in spite of widespread anecdotal reporting of a high rate of deaths throughout the 1970s from what was known as 'junkie pneumonia' and was likely Pneumocystis pneumonia." The statistics Crimp writes about were taken from a New York Times article from October 1987 about a NYC Department of Health study that showed that 53% of AIDS sufferers were people who injected drugs – more than 150 percent higher than previously reported. Quoting: "City health officials estimated that half of the city's 200,000 intravenous drug users were infected with the virus that causes AIDS".

The study "HIV-1 Infection Among Intravenous Drug Users in Manhattan, New York City, from 1977 through 1987", published in February 1989, seeks to understand long term trends in the spread of HIV among intravenous drug users (IDUs). AIDS surveillance data and studies which detail the number of persons who tested HIV positive in Manhattan are used to compile information deemed critical to realising the extent of the AIDS epidemic. It starts by stating that up to September 1988, IDU was the risk behaviour in 19,139 (or 26%) of the first 72,223 cases of AIDS in the US. Cases among IDUs in New York City in the same period numbered 6,182 (approximately a third of national IDU cases). The study continues to outline the methodology used in the compilation of data. It says that while truly representative samples of IDUs within a community are probably impossible to obtain, samples of IDUs entering treatment provide a good source for monitoring trends. In the results section it states (quoting): "The first evidence for HIV-1 infection among IV drug users in New York is from three cases of AIDS in children born in 1977. These cases were later reported to the New York City Department of Health AIDS Surveillance Unit. These children did not receive any known transfusions prior to developing AIDS and were born to mothers known to be IV drug users."

It continues to outline that the earliest known case of AIDS in an adult IDU occurred in 1979 (mixed risk) and that known cases among IDUs increased rapidly from the 8 cases in 1980 (3 mixed risk), to 31 cases in 1981, to 160 cases in 1982, and to 340 cases in 1983. Statistics on the incidence of positive tests for HIV, mainly using archived samples, are: 1 out of 11 in 1978; 13 out of 50 in 1979; 8 out of 21 in 1980; 14 out of 28 between 1981 and 1983; 75 out of 137 and 38 out of 63 in 1984; 36 out of 55 in 1986 and 169 out of 294 in 1987. In the comments section, it states: "The three cases in 1977 of apparent perinatal transmission (mother-to-child) from IV drug-using women strongly suggest that the introduction of HIV-1 into the IV drug-use group occurred around 1975 or 1976, or perhaps even earlier." It says that without extensive samples from this period, it is not possible to be certain about the spread of HIV among IDUs, but the samples from IDUs with chronic liver disease suggest that the rates of infection were below 20% for the first 3 or 4 years after its introduction.

HIV is thought to have entered the population of people using intravenous drugs in New York City in approximately 1975. In Spring 1975, the government of New York City underwent a fiscal crisis which led to the closing of many social services, with people who used intravenous drugs living in a hostile sociopolitical and legal environment. This fiscal crisis led to many agencies with health responsibilities being particularly hard hit, which in turn might have led to an increase in HIV/AIDS and Tuberculosis (TB). Quoting from a 2006 American Journal of Public Health study: "Between 1974 and 1977, the Department of Health (DOH) budget (in NY) was cut by 20%, and by 1977 the department had lost 1700 staff members – 28% of its 1974 workforce. To achieve these reductions, the department closed 7 of 20 district health centers, cut $1 million from its methadone program, terminated the employment of 14 of 19 health educators, and closed 20 of 75 child health stations and 6 of 14 chest clinics (the units responsible for TB screening and diagnosis)."

A study published in the Journal of the American Medical Association in 1986 linked TB and HIV/AIDS: "Severe and unusual presentation of overwhelming tuberculosis in appropriate clinical circumstances may be considered an infection predictive of the presence of AIDS." Further, a study from 1987 stated there was a link between the rise in TB, AIDS and drug users within the United States: "AIDS thus compounds the risk of acquiring tuberculosis, and in the United States most patients with AIDS and tuberculosis have been drug users." A newsletter from Spring 1987 by the National Coalition Of Gay STD Services featured an article titled "Tuberculosis and AIDS - Connecticut" that suggested an association between TB and AIDS within that state.

=== 1981–1982: From GRID to AIDS ===
The AIDS epidemic officially began on June 5, 1981, when the U.S. Centers for Disease Control and Prevention in its Morbidity and Mortality Weekly Report newsletter reported unusual clusters of Pneumocystis pneumonia (PCP) caused by a form of Pneumocystis carinii (now recognized as a distinct species, Pneumocystis jirovecii) in five homosexual men in Los Angeles. Over the next 18 months, more PCP clusters were discovered among otherwise healthy men in cities throughout the country, along with other opportunistic diseases (such as Kaposi's sarcoma and persistent, generalized lymphadenopathy), common in immunosuppressed patients.

In June 1982, a report of a group of cases amongst gay men in Southern California suggested that a sexually transmitted infectious agent might be the etiological agent. The syndrome was initially termed "GRID", or "gay-related immune deficiency"; other less common gay-specific terms included "gay compromise syndrome", "gay lymph node syndrome", "gay cancer", "gay plague", "homosexual syndrome", "community-acquired immunodeficiency" ("CAID") and "acquired community immunodeficiency syndrome" ("ACIDS"). The same opportunistic infections were also reported among hemophiliacs, users of intravenous drugs such as heroin, and Haitian immigrants—leading some researchers to call it the "4H" disease. By August 1982, the disease was being referred to by its new CDC-coined name: Acquired Immune Deficiency Syndrome (AIDS).

== Activism by AIDS patients and families ==
During the beginning of the HIV/AIDS epidemic, it was believed that this disease mainly affected gay, white males. Due to this misconception, people of color were provided with no information or services in order to educate and help those who were HIV positive. As more activists spoke out about their concerns, organizations, such as Black Coalition For AIDS Prevention and Alliance For South Asian AIDS Prevention came to be, providing their communities with services in order to enhance the lives of HIV positive individuals and to reduce the spread of HIV/AIDS.

In New York City, Nathan Fain, Larry Kramer, Larry Mass, Paul Popham, Paul Rapoport, and Edmund White officially established the Gay Men's Health Crisis (GMHC) in 1982.

In 1982, the Sisters of Perpetual Indulgence, a gay activist group, published Play Fair!. It was a sex-positive, humorous educational manual targeted at gay men, advocating for safer sex to avoid AIDS and STIs. Two of the Sisters were public health nurses, one of whom, Bobbi Campbell, already had Kaposi's Sarcoma. They consulted with a doctor to produce the work, which they distributed for free at San Francisco's Gay Freedom Day on June 27, 1982. Play Fair! is credited as the first pamphlet to educate people on having safer sex. The Sisters dedicated themselves to supporting the LGBTQ community as it dealt with the AIDS epidemic, trying to raise awareness and help affected community members. They staged one of the earliest fundraisers for HIV/AIDS in June 1982, and continued to raise money through the 1980s for HIV positive individuals.

Also in 1982, Michael Callen and Richard Berkowitz wrote How to Have Sex in an Epidemic: One Approach. In this short work, they described ways gay men could be sexual and affectionate while dramatically reducing the risk of contracting or spreading HIV. Both authors were themselves gay men living with AIDS. This booklet was one of the first times men were advised to use condoms when having sexual relations with other men. This work, along with Play Fair! is credited with inventing the broader safer sex movement.

At the beginning of the AIDS epidemic in the 1980s, there was very little information about the disease. Because AIDS disproportionately affected stigmatized groups, such as homosexuals, people of low socioeconomic status, sex workers and addicts, there was also initially little mass media coverage when the epidemic started. However, with the rise of activist groups composed of people suffering from AIDS, either directly or through a loved one, more public attention was brought to the epidemic.

=== Historical details ===
The HIV/AIDS epidemic of 1987 caused the death of nearly 60,000 people globally. There was difficulty in protecting different groups due to public misunderstanding. When the epidemic began gaining more attention and effect within the communities of the United States, it mostly affected gay, white males and then came the common misconception: “gay syndrome” or “gay plague”. There exists no substantial government legislation to completely deny explicit discrimination on the basis of sexual orientation, gender identity, etc.

Various studies and media in current times can show how medical advancements had made headway in controlling the spread within not just the body and immune system, also among communities. The “HIV/AIDS epidemic is settling into spatially and socially isolated groups and possibly becoming endemic within them”. This explains how divided people became with the growing fear of the unknown with the virus at this certain point. What came out of this claim is a realization that there is heavier meaning behind a choice of words and what they can relay to groups of people. Why this is important comes from how multi-dimensional the disease’s impact is. The word “impact” itself has been a word very commonly seen in articles and studies on the HIV/AIDS virus/disease, but what it really means relates to how impact is not a cause and effect action, but the “reaction or response” it brings out.

=== Activism ===
Many people of color and those who lacked access to educational resources faced significant hardship, especially among Black and Asian communities in the United States. Activism played a major role in changing how HIV/AIDS was treated as a whole and what the government pushed forward in terms of policy and reform. Activist organizations such as the Black Coalition for AIDS Prevention and Alliance for South Asian AIDS Prevention became notable for their support and activism in addressing the stigma and barriers surrounding the disease, those affected, and the overall control of the disease. The AIDS Coalition to Unleash Power (ACT UP) was one of the most well-known associations, founded by activist Larry Kramer. The group highlighted the importance of representation for those who lacked equal rights, did not have access to resources for treatment and care, and suffered abandonment from family and close friends. The group was among the first to propose healthcare solutions tailored to the populations being treated and advocated for changes within state insurance laws and legislation, especially the “exclusionary policies against gay men.” When experimental drugs began to be developed for HIV/AIDS, activists emphasized the importance of equal access to these treatments, including those not yet approved by the FDA. “Therapies and innovative care” were among the many resources these activists argued should be available for all people, not only the “privileged.”

== Identification of the virus ==
=== May 1983: LAV ===
In May 1983, a team of doctors at the Pasteur Institute in France including Françoise Barré-Sinoussi and Luc Montagnier reported that they had isolated a new retrovirus from lymphoid ganglions that they believed was the cause of AIDS. The virus was later named lymphadenopathy-associated virus (LAV) and a sample was sent to the U.S. Centers for Disease Control, which was later passed to the National Cancer Institute (NCI).

=== May 1984: HTLV-III ===
In May 1984 a team led by Robert Gallo of the United States confirmed the discovery of the virus, but they renamed it human T lymphotropic virus type III. This should not be confused with the HTLV-3 virus, a member of the unrelated PLTV family of viruses, which was discovered in 2005.

=== August 1984: ARV ===
Dr. Jay Levy's group at the University of California, San Francisco also played a role in the discovery of HIV. He independently isolated the AIDS virus in 1983 and named it the AIDS-associated Retrovirus (ARV), publishing his findings in the journal Science in 1984.

=== January 1985: both found to be the same ===
In January 1985, a number of more-detailed reports were published concerning LAV and HTLV-III, and by March it was clear that the viruses were the same—indeed, it was later determined that the virus isolated by the Gallo lab was from the lymph nodes of the patient studied in the original 1983 report by Montagnier—and was the etiological agent of AIDS.

=== May 1986: the name HIV ===
In May 1986, the International Committee on Taxonomy of Viruses ruled that both names should be dropped and a new name, HIV (Human Immunodeficiency Virus), be used.

=== Nobel ===
Whether Barré-Sinoussi and Montagnier deserve more credit than Gallo for the discovery of the virus that causes AIDS has been a matter of considerable controversy. Barré-Sinoussi and Montagnier were awarded the 2008 Nobel Prize in Physiology or Medicine for their "discovery of human immunodeficiency virus", and Harald zur Hausen also shared the prize for his discovery that human papilloma virus leads to cervical cancer, but Gallo was left out. Gallo said that it was "a disappointment" that he was not named a co-recipient. Montagnier said he was "surprised" Gallo was not recognized by the Nobel Committee: "It was important to prove that HIV was the cause of AIDS, and Gallo had a very important role in that. I'm very sorry for Robert Gallo." Dr Levy's contribution to the discovery of HIV was also cited in the Nobel Prize ceremony.

== Case definition for epidemiological surveillance ==
Since June 5, 1981, many definitions have been developed for epidemiological surveillance such as the Bangui definition and the 1994 expanded World Health Organization AIDS case definition.

== Genetic studies ==
According to a study published in the Proceedings of the National Academy of Sciences in 2008, a team led by Robert Shafer at Stanford University School of Medicine discovered that the gray mouse lemur has an endogenous lentivirus (the genus to which HIV belongs) in its genetic makeup. This suggests that lentiviruses have existed for at least 14 million years, much longer than the currently known existence of HIV. In addition, the time frame falls in the period when Madagascar was still connected to what is now the African continent; the said lemurs later developed immunity to the virus strain and survived an era when the lentivirus was widespread among other mammals. The study was hailed as crucial, as it fills the blanks in the origin of the virus, as well as in its evolution, and could be important in the development of new antiviral drugs.

In 2010, researchers reported that SIV had infected monkeys in Bioko for at least 32,000 years. Previous to this time, it was thought that SIV infection in monkeys had happened over the past few hundred years. Scientists estimated that it would take a similar amount of time before humans adapted naturally to HIV infection in the way monkeys in Africa have adapted to SIV and not suffer any harm from the infection.

A 2016 Czech study of the genome of Malayan flying lemurs, an order of mammals parallel to primates and sharing an immediate common ancestor with them, found endogenous lentiviruses that emerged an estimated 40–60 million years ago based on rates of viral mutation versus modern lentiviruses.

== Debunked HIV/AIDS conspiracy theories ==
=== AIDS denialism ===
AIDS denialists argue that AIDS does not exist or that AIDS is not caused by HIV; some of its proponents believe that AIDS is caused by lifestyle, including sexuality or drug use, and not by HIV. Both forms of AIDS denialism contradict scientific consensus. The evidence that HIV causes AIDS is generally considered conclusive among pathologists. Most arguments for denialism are based on misrepresentations of outdated data. The belief that HIV was created by the US government as a bioweapon, an idea invented by a Soviet propaganda operation, is held by a disproportionately high number of Africans and African-Americans.

== See also ==
- Timeline of HIV/AIDS
