= Timeline of HIV/AIDS =

This is a timeline of HIV/AIDS, including but not limited to cases before 1980.

== Pre-1980s ==
X-ray showing infection with Pneumocystis carinii pneumonia

Researchers estimate that some time in the early 20th century, a form of Simian immunodeficiency virus found in chimpanzees (SIVcpz) first entered humans in Central Africa and began circulating in Léopoldville (modern-day Kinshasa) by the 1920s. This gave rise to the pandemic form of HIV (HIV-1 group M); other zoonotic transmissions led to the other, less prevalent, subtypes of HIV.

1930s to 1950s
A range of small scale Pneumocystis pneumonia epidemics occurred in northern and central European countries between the 1930s and 1950s, affecting children who were prematurely born. The epidemics spread likely due to infected glass syringes and needles. Malnutrition was not considered a cause, as Europe largely had recovered from wartime food shortages. Researchers state that the most likely cause of the epidemic was a retrovirus closely related to HIV (or a mild version of HIV) brought to Europe and originating from Cameroon, a former German colony. The epidemic started in the Free City of Danzig in 1939 and then spread to nearby countries in the 1940s and 1950s, including Switzerland and the Netherlands.
1952
American Richard Edwin Graves Jr., a 28-year-old World War II veteran who had been stationed in the Solomon Islands died on 26 July 1952 in Memphis, Tennessee, with pneumocystis pneumonia and CMV, which some authors suggest constitutes a sufficient number of opportunistic infections that are suggestive of an AIDS diagnosis.
1959
The first known case of HIV in a human occurs in a Bantu man who died in the Congo. His blood sample, designated LEO70, which was taken for a study on Malaria and Glucose-6-phosphate dehydrogenase deficiency later tested positive for HIV using multiple testing modalities.
June 28, 1959: In New York City, Ardouin Antonio, a 49-year-old Haitian shipping clerk, dies of Pneumocystis carinii pneumonia, a disease now closely associated with AIDS but then considered highly anomalous for an adult. Gordon Hennigar, who performed the postmortem examination of the man's body, found "the first reported instance of unassociated Pneumocystis carinii disease in an adult" to be so unusual that he preserved Ardouin's lungs for later study. The case was published in two medical journals at the time, and Hennigar has been quoted in numerous publications saying that he believes Ardouin probably had AIDS.
David Carr, a Manchester printer (sometimes mistakenly referred to as a sailor) who died on 31 August 1959 following the failure of his immune system; he succumbed to pneumonia. Baffled by what he had died from, doctors preserved 50 of his tissue samples for inspection. In 1990, the tissues were found to be HIV-positive. However, in 1992, a second test by AIDS researcher David Ho found that the strain of HIV which was present in the tissues was similar to the strain of HIV which was found in tissue samples which were collected and analyzed in the late 1980s rather than an earlier strain of HIV (which would have mutated considerably over the course of 30 years). Ho's discovery has cast doubt on the theory that David Carr's death was caused by AIDS.
1960s
HIV-2, a viral variant found in West Africa, is thought to have transferred to people from sooty mangabey monkeys in Guinea-Bissau.
Genetic studies of the virus indicate that HIV-1 (M) first arrived in the Americas in the late 1960s likely in Haiti or another Caribbean island. At this time, many Haitians were working in the Congo, providing the opportunity for infection.
1964
Jerome Horwitz of Barbara Ann Karmanos Cancer Institute and Wayne State University School of Medicine synthesizes AZT under a grant from the US National Institutes of Health (NIH). AZT was originally intended as an anticancer drug.
1966
Williams and Williams note that an unusually high incidence of simultaneous Kaposi's sarcoma, river blindness, and femoral hernia in patients within the West Nile sub-region of Uganda. They went on to speculate that the black fly which transmits river blindness may also transmit the causative agent for Kaposi's sarcoma.
Slavin, Cameron, and Singh note first that research indicates that "Kaposi's sarcoma occurs with great frequency in indigenous African Negroes", and then goes on to describe 117 cases of Kaposi's sarcoma (including cases in children indicative of vertical transmission), typical of HIV/AIDS infection. Finally, they note that, at the time of publication, 4% of malignancies diagnosed in Tanzania by biopsy indicated Kaposi's sarcoma as the causative agent.
1969
A St. Louis teenager, identified as Robert Rayford, dies of an illness that baffled his doctors since first exhibiting symptoms in 1966. Eighteen years later, molecular biologists at Tulane University in New Orleans test samples of his remains and find evidence of HIV, suggesting he may have been the first documented AIDS case in North America.
1976
January: The 8-year-old daughter of Arvid Noe dies of what was later identified the first AIDS death in Europe. Noe, a Norwegian sailor, dies in April; his wife dies in December. Later it is determined that Noe contracted HIV-1 type O, in Africa during the early 1960s.
1977
Danish physician Grethe Rask dies of AIDS contracted in Africa.
A San Francisco woman, believed to be a sex-worker, gives birth to the first of three children who are later diagnosed with AIDS. The children's blood was tested after their deaths and revealed HIV infection. The mother died of AIDS in May 1987. Test results showed she was infected no later than 1977.
French-Canadian flight attendant Gaëtan Dugas, a relatively early HIV patient, gets legally married in Los Angeles to obtain U.S. citizenship. He stayed in Silver Lake whenever he was in town.
A Zairian woman in her 30s seeks treatment in Belgium for symptoms indicating a suppressed immune system and AIDS-like disease (rapid weight loss, swollen lymph nodes and severe CMV). She initially came to Belgium for care of the oral fungus infection of her baby daughter. Her two other children, who were recently born as well, had died from respiratory infections; both also had an oral fungus infection since birth. The woman contracted even more opportunistic infections, dying in Kinshasa in early 1978. Tissue and blood samples were not preserved, but researchers state this might be an early AIDS case.
1978
A Portuguese man known as Senhor José (English: Mr. Joseph) dies; he will later be confirmed as the first known infection of HIV-2. It is believed that he was exposed to the disease in Guinea-Bissau in 1966.
1979
A thirty-year-old woman from the Dominican Republic dies at Mount Sinai Hospital in New York City from CMV infection.
A Greek man who worked for years as a fisherman at Congo's Lake Tanganyika shows up in a Belgian hospital with a range of untreatable opportunistic infections, including a very rare fungal meningitis. After he dies, the hospital keeps his blood and tissue samples for future analysis. After HIV testing becomes available, his samples are tested for HIV and give a positive result.

== 1980s ==
1980
April 24 – San Francisco resident (and supposed gay sex worker) Ken Horne is reported to the Center for Disease Control with Kaposi's sarcoma (KS). Later, in 1981, the CDC would retroactively identify him as the first patient of the AIDS epidemic in the US. He also had Cryptococcus.
October 31 – Gaëtan Dugas pays his first known visit to New York City bathhouses. He would later be incorrectly deemed "Patient Zero" for his supposed connection to many early cases of AIDS in the United States.
December 23 – Rick Wellikoff, a 37-year-old schoolteacher, dies of AIDS in New York City. He is the fourth US citizen known to die from the illness.
A Zairian woman and a French woman die in late 1980 of Pneumocystis pneumonia in the Claude Bernard Hospital in Paris.
A 36-year-old Danish homosexual male dies in the Rigshospitalet in Copenhagen from Pneumocystis pneumonia.
1981

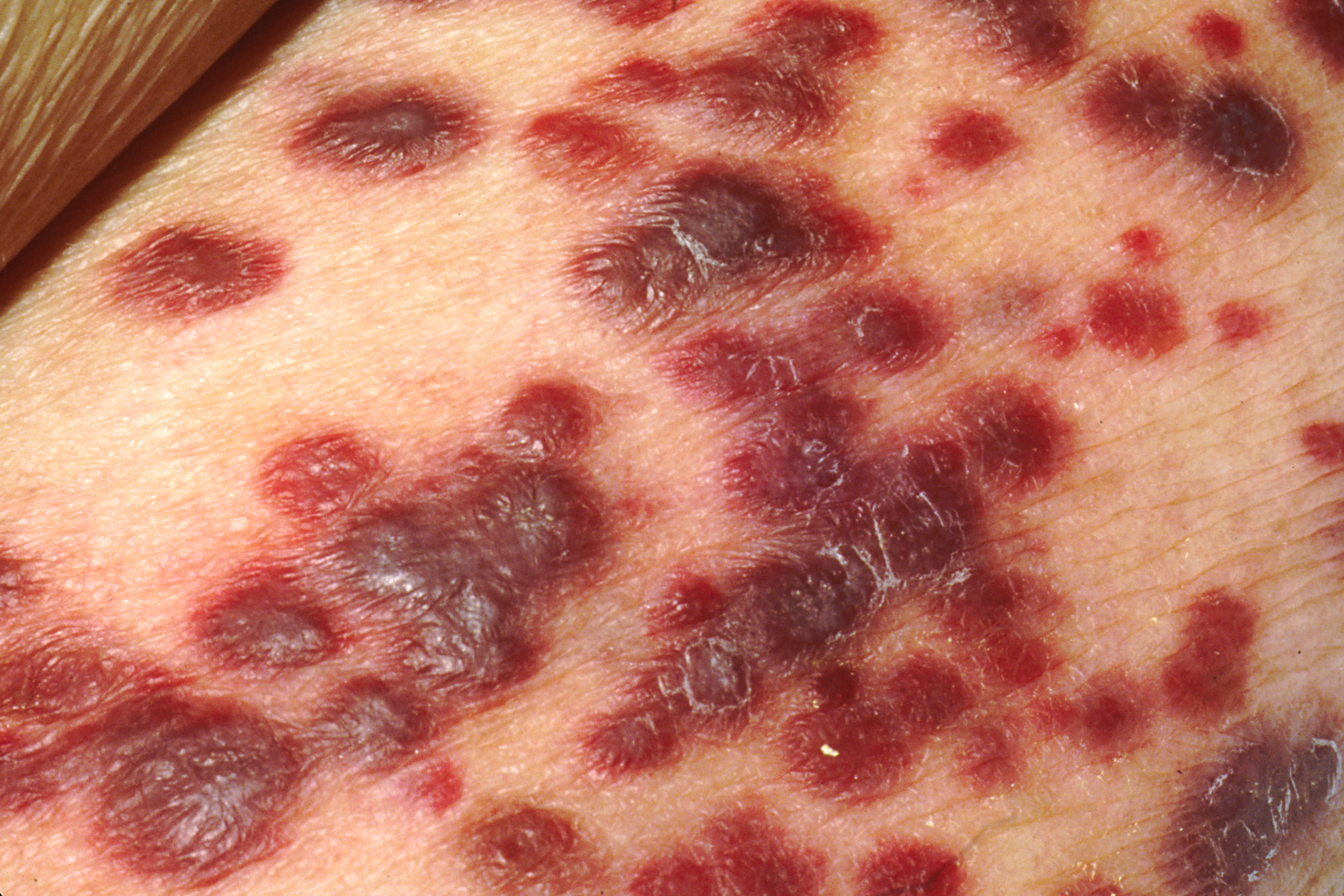
Kaposi's sarcoma on the skin of an AIDS patient

April 28 – Sandy Ford, a drug technician at the Centers for Disease Control, writes her superiors a memo on an unusual cluster of pneumocystis pneumonia and Kaposi's sarcoma cases she has identified. Ford was in charge of CDC distribution of pentamidine, a medicine used to treat pneumocystis pneumonia, and she had noticed a surge in young homosexual men with the disease, which appears only in individuals with suppressed immune systems. Her memo begins the CDC's investigation into the disease.
May 18 – Lawrence Mass becomes the first journalist in the world to write about the epidemic, in the New York Native, a gay newspaper. A gay tipster overheard his physician mention that some gay men were being treated in intensive-care units in New York City for a strange pneumonia. "Disease Rumors Largely Unfounded" was the headline of Mass' article, which ran on page 7. Mass repeated a New York City public health official's claims that there was no wave of disease sweeping through the gay community. At this point, however, the Centers for Disease Control (CDC) had been investigating the outbreak that Mass' source dismissed for about a month.
June 4 – Brent Thomas, the Associate Editor of The Advocate magazine, dies from AIDS complications.
June 5 – In an issue of the Morbidity and Mortality Weekly Report, the CDC reports a cluster of five Pneumocystis pneumonia cases in five "young...practicing homosexuals" in Los Angeles. Each of these cases included simultaneous Cytomegalovirus infection, and several included other AIDS-defining clinical conditions, including Candidiasis, Hodgkin lymphoma, and Cytomegalovirus retinitis. The CDC goes on to suggest that there is a possibility of a "cellular-immune dysfunction related to common exposure that predisposes individuals to Opportunistic infections"
July 3 – An article in The New York Times carries the headline: "Rare Cancer Seen in 41 Homosexuals". The article describes cases of Kaposi's sarcoma found in forty-one gay men, mostly in New York City and San Francisco.
July 3 – A new article appears in Morbidity and Mortality Weekly Report headlined "Kaposi's Sarcoma and Pneumocystis Pneumonia Among Homosexual Men — New York City and California." One cluster in New York City included 20 patients, 7 of whom had died at the time of publication. The other cluster, in California, had just six with an additional death. Of the 26 cases reported, 12 had tests for Cytomegalovirus, all of which were positive. The report describes frequent hepatitis and amoebiasis infections among those described. It also details the apparent connection between Kaposi's sarcoma and immune suppression, noting the abnormality of the disease among young adults. The report notes that, aside from those receiving immunosuppressants, the only group previously known to be at elevated risk for Kaposi's sarcoma was children and young adults in Equatorial Africa — no doubt because of the already endemic HIV in the area.
August 28 – A third article in Morbidity and Mortality Weekly Report increases the number of known cases to 108. While the vast majority remain in New York and California, it reports new cases in Georgia, Florida, and Oklahoma.
October – Self-proclaimed "AIDS poster boy" Bobbi Campbell is diagnosed with Kaposi's sarcoma in San Francisco. That same month he creates and displays San Francisco's first AIDS poster.
October 29 – John Eaddie, 49, dies of pneumocystis pneumonia in London. He is later identified as HIV-positive.
October – The first reported case appears in Spain, in a 35-year-old gay man who died shortly after.
December 10 – Bobbi Campbell is the first to come out publicly as a person with what came to be known as AIDS.
December 12 – The first known case is reported in the United Kingdom.
One of the first reported patients to have died of AIDS (presumptive diagnosis) in the US is reported in the journal Gastroentereology. Louis Weinstein, the treating physician, wrote that "Immunologic incompetence, related to either disease or therapy, or both ... although suspected, could not be proved..."
HIV can be traced in Mexico to 1981.
By the end of the year on December 31, 337 people are known to have had the disease, 321 adults, and 16 children under the age of 13, and of those 130 had died from the disease.
1982
January – The service organization Gay Men's Health Crisis is founded by Larry Kramer and others in New York City.
June 18 – "Exposure to some substance (rather than an infectious agent) may eventually lead to immunodeficiency among a subset of the homosexual male population that shares a particular style of life." For example, Marmor et al. recently reported that exposure to amyl nitrite was associated with an increased risk of KS in New York City. Exposure to inhalant sexual stimulants, central-nervous-system stimulants, and a variety of other "street" drugs was common among males belonging to the cluster of cases of KS and PCP in Los Angeles and Orange counties."
July 4 – Terry Higgins becomes one of the first people to die of AIDS-related illnesses in the United Kingdom, prompting the foundation in November of what was to become the Terrence Higgins Trust.
July 9 – The CDC reports a cluster of opportunistic infections (OI) and Kaposi's sarcoma among Haitians recently entering the United States. Their risk factor for acquiring the syndrome was uncertain. Ten (29.4%) of these 34 patients with the syndrome of unexplained OI and Kaposi's Sarcoma (termed AIDS weeks later by CDC) also had disseminated tuberculosis. This was the first reported association of tuberculosis with AIDS in a cluster of patients. The uncertain risk factor for AIDS among Haitians was ultimately explained mostly by heterosexual transmission.
July 27 – The term AIDS (acquired immune deficiency syndrome) is proposed at a meeting in Washington, D.C. of gay-community leaders, federal bureaucrats and the CDC to replace GRID (gay-related immune deficiency) as evidence showed it was not gay specific.
September 24 – The Centers for Disease Control and Prevention defines a case of AIDS as a disease, at least moderately predictive of a defect in cell-mediated immunity, occurring in a person with no known cause for diminished resistance to that disease. Such diseases include KS, PCP, and serious OI. Diagnoses are considered to fit the case definition only if based on sufficiently reliable methods (generally histology or culture). Some patients who are considered AIDS cases on the basis of diseases only moderately predictive of cellular immunodeficiency may not actually be immunodeficient and may not be part of the current epidemic.
December 10 – A baby in California becomes ill in the first known case of contracting AIDS from a blood transfusion.
The first known case appears in Brazil.
The first known case appears in Canada.
The first known case appears in Italy.
The first known case appears in France.
The first known case appears in Australia, diagnosed at St Vincent's Hospital, Sydney.
1983
January – Françoise Barré-Sinoussi, at the Pasteur Institute in Paris, isolates a retrovirus that kills T-cells from the lymphatic system of a gay AIDS patient. In the following months, she would find additional cases in gay men and people with hemophilia. This retrovirus would be called by several names, including LAV and HTLV-III before being named HIV in 1986.
March – United States Public Health Service (PHS or USPHS) issues donor screening guidelines, stating AIDS high-risk groups should not donate blood/plasma products.
March – AIDS Project Los Angeles is founded by Nancy Cole Sawaya, Matt Redman, Ervin Munro, and Max Drew
The first known case appears in Colombia; a female sexual worker from Cali was diagnosed with HIV in the Hospital Universitario de Cartagena.
The first AIDS-related death occurs in Australia, in the city of Melbourne. The Hawke Labor government invests in a significant campaign that has been credited with ensuring Australia has one of the lowest HIV infection rates in the world.
AIDS is diagnosed in Mexico for the first time. However, HIV can be traced in the country to 1981.
The PCR (polymerase chain reaction) technique is developed by Kary Mullis; it is widely used in AIDS research.
Within a few days of each other, the musicians Jobriath and Klaus Nomi become the first internationally known recording artists to die from AIDS-related illnesses.
The first known case appears in Portugal.
The CDC National AIDS Hotline is established.
1984
April 23 – U.S. Health and Human Services Secretary Margaret Heckler announces at a press conference that an American scientist, Robert Gallo, has discovered the "probable cause" of AIDS: the retrovirus is subsequently named human immunodeficiency virus or HIV in 1986. She also declares that a vaccine will be available within two years.
June 25 – French philosopher Michel Foucault dies of AIDS in Paris. Following his death, AIDES was founded.
September 6 – First performance at Theatre Rhinoceros in San Francisco of The AIDS Show which runs for two years and is the subject of a 1986 documentary film of the same name.
December 17 – Ryan White is diagnosed with AIDS by a doctor performing a partial lung removal. White became infected with HIV from blood products that were administered to him on a regular basis as part of his treatment for hemophilia. When the public school that he attended, Western Middle School in Russiaville, Indiana, learned of his disease in 1985, there was enormous pressure from parents and faculty to bar him from school premises. Due to the widespread fear of AIDS and lack of medical knowledge, principal Ron Colby and the school board assented. His family filed a lawsuit, seeking to overturn the ban.
The first case of HIV infection in the Philippines is reported.
Gaëtan Dugas dies due to AIDS-related illnesses. He was a French-Canadian flight attendant who was falsely identified as patient 0 due to his central location and labeling as "patient O," as in the letter O, in a scientific study of 40 infected Americans from multiple U.S. cities.
Roy Cohn is diagnosed with AIDS, but attempts to keep his condition secret while receiving experimental drug treatment.
The first known cases appear in Ecuador.
Social worker Caitlyn Ryan becomes the first executive director of AID Atlanta, the oldest AIDS service organization in the Southeastern US.
1985
March 2 – The FDA approves an ELISA test as the first commercially available test for detecting HIV in blood. It detects antibodies which the body makes in response to exposure to HIV and is first intended for use on all donated blood and plasma intended for transfusion and product manufacture.
April 21 – The AIDS-related play The Normal Heart by Larry Kramer premieres in New York City.
July 25 – Rock Hudson is the first American celebrity to publicly admit having AIDS; he had been diagnosed with it on June 5, 1984.
July 28 – AIDS Project Los Angeles hosts the world's first AIDS Walk at Paramount Studios in Hollywood. More than 4,500 people helped the Walk surpass its $100,000 goal, raising $673,000.
September 17 – During his second term in office, US President Ronald Reagan publicly mentions AIDS for the first time when asked about the lack of medical research funding by an AP reporter during a press conference.
September 19 - The first Commitment to Life is held in Los Angeles. Elizabeth Taylor hosted the event and honored former First Lady Betty Ford. Taylor said at the event "Tonight is the start of my personal war on this disease, AIDS." The event raised more than $1 million for AIDS Project Los Angeles.
October 2 – Rock Hudson dies of AIDS.
October 12 – Ricky Wilson, guitarist of American rock band The B-52's dies from an AIDS related illness. The album Bouncing Off The Satellites, which he was working on when he died, is dedicated to him when it is released the next year. The band is devastated by the loss and do not tour or promote the album. Wilson is eventually replaced on guitar by his former writing partner Keith Strickland, the B-52's former drummer.
October – A conference of public health officials including representatives of the Centers for Disease Control and World Health Organization meet in Bangui and define AIDS in Africa as "prolonged fevers for a month or more, weight loss of over 10% and prolonged diarrhea".
November 11 – An Early Frost, the first film to cover the topic of HIV/AIDS is broadcast in the U.S. on prime time TV by NBC.
The first officially reported cases appear in China.
The first known case appears in Cuba.
The San Francisco AIDS Foundation produces its first brochure about women and AIDS.
The San Francisco General Hospital, for the first time, admits a woman to the AIDS ward (Ward 5B).
1986

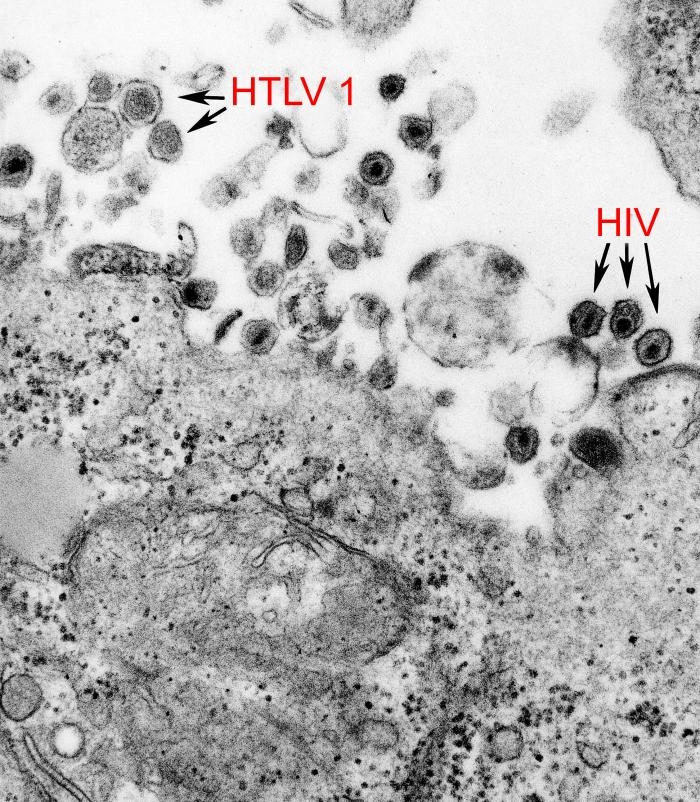
This image revealed the presence of both HTLV-1, and HIV.

January 14 – NIAID Director Anthony Fauci estimates, in a statement to The New York Times, that one million Americans have already been infected with the virus and that this number will jump to at least 2 million or 3 million within 5 to 10 years.
February – US President Ronald Reagan instructs his Surgeon General C. Everett Koop to prepare a report on AIDS. (Koop was excluded from the Executive Task Force on AIDS established in 1983 by his immediate superior, Assistant Secretary of Health Edward Brandt.) Without allowing Reagan's domestic policy advisers to review the report, Koop released the report at a press conference on October 22, 1986.
May 30 – Fashion designer Perry Ellis dies of AIDS-related illness.
August 2 – Roy Cohn dies of complications from AIDS at the age of 59. He insists to the end that his disease was liver cancer.
August – Jerry Smith publicly announces he has AIDS in August 1986, becoming the first former professional athlete to do so. He dies two months later, becoming the first known former professional athlete to die of the disease.
November 18 – Model Gia Carangi dies of AIDS-related illness.
The first officially known cases in the Soviet Union and India appear.
HIV (human immunodeficiency virus) is adopted as the name of the retrovirus that was first proposed as the cause of AIDS by Luc Montagnier of France, who named it LAV (lymphadenopathy associated virus) and Robert Gallo of the United States, who named it HTLV-III (human T-lymphotropic virus type III)
Attorney Geoffrey Bowers is fired from the firm of Baker & McKenzie after AIDS-related Kaposi's sarcoma lesions appeared on his face. The firm maintained that he was fired purely for his performance. He sued the firm, in one of the first AIDS discrimination cases to go to a public hearing. These events inspired in part the 1993 film Philadelphia.
The first book about AIDS policy, AIDS: A Public Health Challenge, is co-authored by Caitlyn Ryan. It serves as a guide to many public officials.
Marie St. Cyr becomes the first director of the New York-based Women and AIDS Resource Network (WARN).
1987
February 4 – Popular performing musician Liberace dies from AIDS related illness.
March 1 – Dr. Peter Duesberg of the University of California, Berkeley publishes a 22-page peer-reviewed article "Retroviruses as Carcinogens and Pathogens: Expectations and Reality". The article challenges the hypothesis that HIV causes AIDS, launching the "AIDS denialist movement".
March – The direct action advocacy group ACT UP is founded by Larry Kramer in New York City.
April – The FDA approves a Western blot test as a more precise test for the presence of HIV antibodies than the ELISA test.'
May 28 – Playwright and performer Charles Ludlam dies of AIDS-related PCP pneumonia.
July 2 – Musical theatre director, writer, choreographer, and dancer Michael Bennett dies of AIDS-related lymphoma at the age of 44.
July 11 – Tom Waddell, founder of the Gay Games, dies of AIDS.
August 18 – The FDA sanctioned the first clinical trial to test an HIV vaccine candidate in a research participant.
December 4 – Arnold Lobel, author of children's picture books such as the Frog and Toad series and Mouse Soup, dies from AIDS-related cardiac arrest.
Randy Shilts' investigative journalism book And the Band Played On is published, chronicling the 1980–1985 discovery and spreading of HIV/AIDS, government indifference, and political infighting in the United States to what was initially perceived as a gay disease. (Shilts died of the disease on February 17, 1994.)
The first known case appears in Nicaragua.
AZT (zidovudine), the first antiretroviral drug, becomes available to treat HIV.
1988
March 3 – John Holmes dies from AIDS-related complications.
March 26 – In Buenos Aires, Argentina, the rock musician Miguel Abuelo dies from AIDS-related complications.
May – C. Everett Koop sends an eight-page, condensed version of his Surgeon General's Report on Acquired Immune Deficiency Syndrome report named Understanding AIDS to all 107,000,000 households in the United States, becoming the first federal authority to provide explicit advice to US citizens on how to protect themselves from AIDS.
August 5 – Screenwriter, actor, director, and producer Colin Higgins dies of an AIDS-related illness at his home at the age of 47.
August 24 - Actor Leonard Frey, who was nominated for the Academy Award for Best Supporting Actor for his performance as Motel the tailor in Norman Jewison's 1971 film Fiddler on the Roof, dies at age 49 from complications of AIDS in New York.
November 11 – The fact-based AIDS-themed film Go Toward the Light is broadcast on CBS.
December 1 – The first World AIDS Day takes place.
December 16 – American disco singer Sylvester dies of AIDS in San Francisco on December 16, 1988.
December 20 – Max Robinson, the first African-American broadcast network news anchor in the United States, dies on December 20 in Washington, D.C. due to complications from AIDS.
December 21 – In Buenos Aires, Argentina, the rock musician Federico Moura dies from AIDS-related complications.
1989
January 18 – British travel writer Bruce Chatwin dies on January 18 from AIDS-related complications.
March 9 – Photographer Robert Mapplethorpe, known for his black-and-white portraits and for documenting New York's BDSM scene, dies at the age of 42 due to complications from HIV/AIDS in a Boston hospital.
July 25 – Entrepreneur Steve Rubell, co-owner of the famed New York City disco Studio 54, dies on from hepatitis and septic shock complicated by AIDS.
August 13 – NASCAR driver Tim Richmond dies from AIDS-related complications.
August 16 – Amanda Blake, best known for her portrayal of saloon owner Miss Kitty on the television show Gunsmoke, becomes the first actress of note in the United States to die of AIDS-related illness. The cause of death was cardiac arrest stemming from CMV hepatitis, an AIDS-related hepatitis.
November 10 - Actress and writer Cookie Mueller, who starred in many of filmmaker John Waters' early films, dies from AIDS-related pneumonia at the age of 40.
December 1 – Dancer, director, choreographer, and activist Alvin Ailey, who founded the Alvin Ailey American Dance Theater and its affiliated Alvin Ailey American Dance Center (later Ailey School) as havens for nurturing Black artists and expressing the universality of the African-American experience through dance, dies from an AIDS-related illness at the age of 58.
The television movie The Ryan White Story airs. It stars Judith Light as Jeanne, Lukas Haas as Ryan and Nikki Cox as sister Andrea. Ryan White had a small cameo appearance as Chad, a young patient with AIDS. Another AIDS-themed film, The Littlest Victims, debuted in 1989, biographically chronicling James Oleske, the first U.S. physician to discover AIDS in newborns during AIDS' early years, when many thought it was only spreading through male-to-male sexual activity.
Covering the Plague by James Kinsella is published, providing a scathing look into how the media fumbled the AIDS story.
Longtime Companion is a 1989 film directed by Norman René and starring Bruce Davison, Campbell Scott, Patrick Cassidy, and Mary-Louise Parker. The first wide-release theatrical film to deal with the subject of AIDS, the film takes its title from the euphemism The New York Times used during the 1980s to describe the surviving same-sex partner of someone who had died of AIDS.
New York's highest court ruled in Braschi vs. Stahl Associates that Miguel Braschi, a surviving gay partner of Leslie Blanchard who died of AIDS in 1986, had the right to continue living in their rent controlled apartment. The landlord's losing argument was that Miguel Braschi was not family because he was not related to Blanchard by "blood, marriage or adoption." The decision marked the first time any top state court in the nation recognized a gay couple to be the legal equivalent of a family, American Civil Liberties Union lawyer William Rubenstein said. The decision was a ground-breaking victory for lesbians and gay men; it marked an important step forward in American law toward legal recognition of lesbian and gay relationships.
Judge Elizabeth A. Kovachevich of the United States District Court for the Middle District of Florida ruled that Eliana Martínez, who had AIDS, could sit at a desk in a classroom without isolation partitions; Martínez attended her first day of school on April 27, 1989.

== 1990s ==
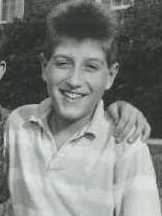
Ryan White

1990
January 6 – British actor Ian Charleson dies from AIDS at the age of 40; it is the first show-business death in the United Kingdom openly attributed to complications from AIDS.
February 16 – New York artist and social activist Keith Haring dies from AIDS-related illness.
April 8 – Ryan White dies at the age of 18 from pneumonia caused by complications associated with AIDS.
Congress enacted The Ryan White Comprehensive AIDS Resources Emergency (CARE) Act or Ryan White Care Act, the United States' largest federally funded health related program (excluding Medicaid and Medicare).
July 7 – Brazilian singer Cazuza dies in Rio de Janeiro at the age of 32 from an AIDS-related illness.
November 9 – American singer-songwriter Tom Fogerty, rhythm guitarist of Creedence Clearwater Revival and older brother of John Fogerty, dies in Berkeley, California of AIDS-related tuberculosis.
The First National Women and HIV Conference is held in Washington, DC.
1991
March 14 – Playwright, lyricist and stage director Howard Ashman dies from HIV/AIDS, at the age of 40 years old.
April – The Pediatric AIDS Clinical Trials Group (ACTG) of the US NIAID and the National Institute of Health and Medical Research (INSERM) and the National Agency of Research on AIDS (ANRS), France start the famous clinical trial of zidovudine (AZT) in HIV-infected pregnant women named "ACTG protocol 076". The trial shows such a big reduction in the risk for HIV transmission to the infant that it was halted prematurely in 1993 and later became the standard of care.
May 26 – Playwright, lyricist, television writer and theatre director Tom Eyen dies of complications from AIDS at the age of fifty.
May – The AIDS-related play Angels in America: A Gay Fantasia on National Themes by Tony Kushner premieres in San Francisco.
June 2 - At the 45th Tony Awards, Jeremy Irons becomes the first celebrity to wear an AIDS awareness ribbon onscreen.
June 5 – Actor, singer, and dancer Larry Kert dies, at 60, in his Manhattan home of AIDS.
September 8 – American actor Brad Davis, Golden Globe winning and BAFTA nominated star of Midnight Express and Chariots of Fire died of an assisted suicide drug overdose after suffering from HIV and AIDS since 1985. He had been an intravenous drug user and was bisexual.
September 28 – Jazz legend Miles Davis dies at the age of 65. The official cause of death is bronchial pneumonia. He was taking Zidovudine (AZT) when hospitalized; at the time, Zidovudine was a treatment for HIV and AIDS.
November 7 – NBA star Magic Johnson publicly announces that he is HIV-positive.
November 15 – French disco and dance music record producer and songwriter Jacques Morali, known for creating acts like The Ritchie Family and Village People, dies of AIDS-related causes at a hospital in Paris at the age of 44.
November 24 – A little over 24 hours after issuing a statement confirming that he had been tested HIV positive and had AIDS, Freddie Mercury (singer of the British band Queen) dies at the age of 45. The official cause of death is bronchial pneumonia resulting from AIDS.
The AIDS awareness ribbon is created in 1991.
1992
January 7 – Puppeteer Richard Hunt, best known as a Muppet performer on Sesame Street, The Muppet Show, Fraggle Rock, and other projects for The Jim Henson Company, dies of HIV/AIDS-related complications at Cabrini Hospice in Manhattan, aged 40.
April 6 – Popular science fiction writer Isaac Asimov dies. Ten years later, his wife revealed that his death was due to AIDS-related complications. The writer was infected during a blood transfusion in 1983.
May 1 – Dance music singer Sharon Redd dies of AIDS-related pneumonia.
May 12 – Robert Reed, best known as Mike Brady on the sitcom The Brady Bunch dies of AIDS.
June 18 – Australian singer Peter Allen dies from complications due to AIDS.
September 12 – American actor Anthony Perkins, known for his role as Norman Bates in the Psycho movies, dies from AIDS.
September 29 – Actor, singer, and songwriter Paul Jabara dies from complications from AIDS in Los Angeles, California at the age of 44.
October 22 – Denholm Elliott, best known as Marcus Brody on the Indiana Jones film series, dies of AIDS-related tuberculosis.
At the Royal Free Hospital in London, an out-patients' centre for HIV and AIDS is opened by Ian McKellen. It is named the Ian Charleson Day Centre after actor Ian Charleson.
Leanza Cornett becomes the first Miss America to adopt AIDS awareness as her platform for her year of service.
The first combination drug therapies for HIV are introduced.
1993
January 6 – Rudolf Nureyev, one of the world's greatest ballet dancers, dies from AIDS.
January – The Centers for Disease Control and Prevention's expanded definition of AIDS becomes active.
February 6 – Tennis star Arthur Ashe dies from AIDS-related complications.
June 11 – Stage, film and television actor Ray Sharkey dies of complications from AIDS in Brooklyn, New York, at age 40.
June 29 , singer Héctor Lavoe dies of AIDS related complications.
August 29 – Drag performer and fashion designer Dorian Corey dies of AIDS-related complications in Manhattan at the age of 56.
November 20 – Television and film director and producer Emile Ardolino, best known for his work on the films Dirty Dancing (1987) and Sister Act (1992), dies of complications from AIDS. Also, Australian/New Zealand AIDS awareness campaigner Eve van Grafhorst dies from AIDS aged 11, having contracted HIV at birth from blood transfusions.
1994
February 17 – Randy Shilts, author of And the Band Played On: Politics, People, and the AIDS Epidemic, dies at his home of AIDS-related complications.
February 19 – English artist, film maker, costume designer, stage designer, writer, gardener, and gay rights activist Derek Jarman dies at age 52 from an AIDS-related illness in London.
March 21 – Actor Dack Rambo dies of AIDS-related complications. He was one of the first actors in Hollywood to publicly acknowledge being HIV positive. He retired from acting and spent the remainder of his life raising awareness about AIDS.
March 22 – Musician and singer-songwriter Dan Hartman dies due to an HIV/AIDS-related brain tumor in Westport, Connecticut.
April 16 – Actor Ron Vawter, a founding member of the experimental theater company The Wooster Group, dies from an AIDS-related heart attack while on a plane from Zürich to New York City.
November 11 – Television personality Pedro Zamora, who brought international attention to HIV/AIDS and LGBTQ issues and prejudices through his appearance on MTV's reality television series, The Real World: San Francisco, dies from AIDS-related progressive multifocal leukoencephalopathy at the age of 22.
December 3 – Elizabeth Glaser, wife of Starsky & Hutch's Paul Michael Glaser, dies from AIDS-related complications, almost 10 years after receiving an infected blood transfusion while giving birth. She unknowingly passes HIV on to her daughter Ariel and son Jake. Ariel died in 1988, Jake is living with HIV, and Paul Michael remains negative.
December 31 – Australian performance artist, club promoter, and fashion designer Leigh Bowery dies from an AIDS-related illness.
Sarah Jane Salazar, a 19-year-old Filipino AIDS activist and educator, publicly states she contracted HIV from a foreign customer while working as a club entertainer in the early 1990s. She was the second Filipino to do so. The first was Dolzura Cortez.
Jeanne Gapiya-Niyonzima becomes the first person from Burundi to publicly declare that they are HIV positive.
1995
February 23 – Multiple World Champion and Olympic Gold Medal winning diver Greg Louganis revealed that he was HIV positive and had been diagnosed six months prior to him competing in the 1988 Seoul Olympics. The revelation proved controversial because he had hit his head on the diving board during competition at the games and bled into the water and was stitched up by team doctors, potentially exposing others to the virus.
March 26 – Rapper Eazy-E dies from AIDS-related pneumonia.
March 29 – Jimmy McShane, lead singer of the Italian new wave band Baltimora, dies of an AIDS-related illness.
April 4 – British DJ and entertainer Kenny Everett dies from AIDS.
April 5 – Actor and operatic baritone Ron Richardson dies of complications of AIDS, at the age of 43.
May 26 – Character actor Tony Azito dies of HIV/AIDS in Manhattan, New York City, at age 46.
August 16 – Singer and musician Bobby DeBarge dies of AIDS complications at age 39.
Oakland, California resident Jeff Getty becomes the first person to receive a bone marrow transplant from a baboon as an experimental procedure to treat his HIV infection. The graft did not take, but Getty experienced some reduction in symptoms before dying of heart failure after cancer treatment in 2006.
Saquinavir, a new type of protease inhibitor drug, becomes available to treat HIV. Highly active antiretroviral therapy (HAART) becomes possible. Within two years, death rates due to AIDS will have plummeted in the developed world.
1996
October 11 – Renato Russo, lead singer of Brazilian band Legião Urbana dies from AIDS-related complications.
November 13 – Brazilian Law No. 9313 is enacted, providing every Brazilian with HIV the right to free medication.
December 8 – Actor Howard Rollins dies at age 46 due to complications from AIDS-related lymphoma.
Cynthia Culpeper becomes the first pulpit rabbi to announce being diagnosed with AIDS, which occurs while she is rabbi of Agudath Israel in Montgomery, Alabama.
Robert Gallo's discovery that some natural compounds known as chemokines can block HIV and halt the progression of AIDS is hailed by Science as one of that year's most important scientific breakthroughs.
HIV resistance due to the CCR5-Δ32 is discovered. CCR5-Δ32 (or CCR5-D32 or CCR5 delta 32) is an allele of CCR5.
1997
March 17 – R&B singer Jermaine Stewart dies of AIDS-related liver cancer at age 39.
August 2 – Nigerian musician and political activist Fela Kuti dies at age 58. The following day, Kuti's brother Olikoye Ransome-Kuti, already a prominent AIDS activist and former Minister of Health, announced that Kuti had died on the previous day from complications related to AIDS. Kuti had been an AIDS denialist, and his widow maintained that he did not die of AIDS.
September 2 – The Washington Post carries an article stating, "The most recent estimate of the number of Americans infected (with HIV), 750,000, is only half the total that government officials used to cite over a decade ago, at a time when experts believed that as many as 1.5 million people carried the virus."
December 7 – "French President Jacques Chirac addressed Africa's top AIDS conference on Sunday and called on the world's richest nations to create an AIDS therapy support fund to help Africa. According to Chirac, Africa struggles to care for two-thirds of the world's persons with AIDS without the benefit of expensive AIDS therapies. Chirac invited other countries, especially European nations, to create a fund that would help increase the number of AIDS studies and experiments. AIDS workers welcomed Chirac's speech and said they hoped France would promote the idea to the Group of Eight summit of the world's richest nations."
Based on the Bangui definition the World Health Organization's cumulative number of reported AIDS cases from 1980 through 1997 for all of Africa is 620,000. For comparison, the cumulative total of AIDS cases in the USA through 1997 is 641,087.
1998
December 10 – International Human Rights Day, Treatment Action Campaign (TAC) is launched to campaign for greater access to HIV treatment for all South Africans, by raising public awareness and understanding about issues surrounding the availability, affordability and use of HIV treatments. TAC campaigns against the view that AIDS is a death sentence.
1999
January 31 – Studies suggest that a retrovirus, SIVcpz (simian immunodeficiency virus) from the common chimpanzee Pan troglodytes, may have passed to human populations in west equatorial Africa during the 20th century and developed into various types of HIV.
Edward Hooper releases a book titled The River, which accuses doctors who developed and administered the oral polio vaccine in 1950s Africa of unintentionally starting the AIDS epidemic. The OPV AIDS hypothesis receives a great deal of publicity. It was later refuted by studies demonstrating the origins of HIV as a mutated variant of a simian immunodeficiency virus that is lethal to humans. Hooper's hypothesis should not be confused with the Heart of Darkness origin theory.

== 2000s ==
2000
February 23 – Israeli singer Ofra Haza dies in Tel Aviv of AIDS-related complications.
June 11 – Sarah Jane Salazar dies at the age of 25 from AIDS complications.
At the federal level, the Needlestick Safety and Prevention Act becomes a national law in America in 2000.
The World Health Organization estimates between 15% and 20% of new HIV infections worldwide are the result of blood transfusions, where the donors were not screened or inadequately screened for HIV.
2001
September 21 – The Food and Drug Administration (FDA) licenses the first nucleic acid test (NAT) systems intended for screening of blood and plasma donations.
2002
The Food and Drug Administration (FDA) approves the first rapid diagnostic HIV test kit for use in the United States. The kit has a 99.6% accuracy and can provide results in as little as twenty minutes. The test kit can be used at room temperature, did not require specialized equipment, and can be used outside of clinics and doctor's offices. The mobility and speed of the test allowed a wider spread use of HIV testing.
2003
US President George W. Bush initiates the President's Emergency Plan for AIDS Relief. By the time he leaves office it provides medicine for 2 million Africans.
The U.S. Leadership Against HIV/AIDS, Tuberculosis, and Malaria Act of 2003 (or the Global AIDS Act) specifies a series of broad and specific goals, alternately delegating authority to the president for identifying measurable outcomes in some areas, and specifying by law the quantitative benchmarks to be reached within discrete periods of time in others. The legislation also establishes the State Department Office of the Global AIDS Coordinator to oversee all international AIDS funding and programming.
2005
January 6 – "Individual risk of acquiring HIV and experiencing rapid disease progression is not uniform within populations," says Anthony S. Fauci, the director of NIAID.
January 21 – The Centers for Disease Control and Prevention recommends anti-retroviral post-exposure prophylaxis for people exposed to HIV from rapes, accidents or occasional unsafe sex or drug use. This treatment should start no more than 72 hours after a person has been exposed to the virus, and the drugs should be used by patients for 28 days. This emergency drug treatment had been recommended since 1996 for health-care workers accidentally stuck with a needle, splashed in their eyes with blood, or exposed in some other work-related way.
September 2 – Dancer and choreographer Willi Ninja, who founded the House of Ninja (prominently featured in the documentary film Paris Is Burning), dies of AIDS-related heart failure in New York City.
November 9 - SIV found in gorillas.
A highly resistant strain of HIV linked to rapid progression to AIDS is identified in New York City.
2007
The first case of someone being cured of HIV is reported. Timothy Ray Brown is a San Francisco man, with leukemia and HIV. He is cured of HIV through a bone marrow transplant in Germany from a homozygous CCR5-Δ32 donor. Other similar cases are being studied to confirm similar results.
Maraviroc, the first available CCR5 receptor antagonist, is approved by the FDA as an antiviral drug for the treatment of AIDS.
2008
January - The Swiss Statement declaration is made by the Swiss Federal Commission for AIDS-related issues. It proclaims that people taking antiretroviral therapy with excellent adherence, with a consistently low blood viral load and no other STDs can be considered noncontagious. The statement is controversial due to lack of substantiating studies, however by 2016 the statement is validated by the PARTNER-1 study among others.

== 2010s ==
2010
Confirmation is published that the first patient cured of HIV, Timothy Ray Brown, still has a negative HIV status, four years after treatment.
2012
The Food and Drug Administration (FDA) approves Truvada for pre-exposure prophylaxis (PrEP). The drug can be taken by adults who do not have HIV, but are at risk for the disease. People can now take this medication to reduce their risk for contracting the virus through sexual activity.
2013
Confirmation is published that a toddler has been "functionally cured" of HIV infection. However, in 2014, it was announced that the girl had relapsed and that the virus had re-appeared.
A New York Times article says that 12 people of 75 who began combination antiretroviral therapy soon after becoming infected may have been "functionally cured" of HIV according to a French study. A functionally cured person will not experience an increase of the virus in the bloodstream despite stopping antiretroviral therapy, and therefore not progress to AIDS.
2014
July – Former International AIDS Society president Joep Lange and other HIV/AIDS researchers were killed onboard the Malaysia Airlines Flight 17.
December – PEPFAR announces a program, PEPFAR 3.0, focusing on Sustainable Control of the AIDS epidemic. This program is designed to address the UNAIDS "90-90-90" global goal: 90 percent of people with HIV diagnosed, 90 percent of them on ART and 90 percent of them virally suppressed by the year 2020.
2015
A new, aggressive strain of HIV discovered in Cuba. Researchers at the University of Leuven in Belgium say the HIV strain CRF19 can progress to AIDS within two to three years of exposure to virus. Typically, HIV takes approximately 10 years to develop into AIDS. The researchers found that patients with the CRF19 variant had more virus in their blood than patients who had more common strains. Patients with CRF19 may start getting sick before they even know they have been infected, which ultimately means there is a significantly shorter time span to stop the disease's progression. The researchers suspect that fragments of other subsets of the virus fasten to each other through an enzyme which makes the virus more powerful and more easily replicated in the body, thus the faster progression.
2016
The Prevention Access Campaign first promotes the health-education message Undetectable = Untransmittable which in the following years is endorsed by the World Health Organisation.
September 11 – Transgender actress, musician, and drag performer Alexis Arquette dies at age 47 due to cardiac arrest caused by myocarditis stemming from HIV.
Researchers have found that an international study found that almost 2,000 patients with HIV failed to respond to the antiviral drug known as Tenofovir disoproxil. Tenofovir is the main HIV drug treatment. The failure to respond to treatment indicates that the virus' resistance to the medication is becoming increasingly common.
The United Nations holds its 2016 High-Level Meeting on Ending AIDS. The countries involved, the member states of the United Nations, pledge to end the AIDS epidemic by 2030. There was significant controversy surrounding the event as over 50 countries blocked the access of LGBTQ+ groups from participating in the meeting. At the conclusion of the meetings, which ran from June 8 to 10, 2016, the final resolution barely mentioned several groups that are most affected by HIV/AIDS: men who have sex with men, transgender people, people who inject drugs, and sex workers.
2019
A second patient is reported to be cured of HIV/AIDS using the same cell therapy approach that cured the first patient of HIV/AIDS, removing doubts that the first instance of the cure was a fluke and providing clinical proof that a cure for HIV/AIDS is both possible and repeatable.
Research Foundation to Cure AIDS (RFTCA) becomes the first 501(c)3 public charity in the United States with a grant to its own biotechnology to research, develop and commercialize a cure for HIV/AIDS on a pro bono basis.
National Institutes of Health, in collaboration with Bill & Melinda Gates Foundation, launches a $200 million commitment to fund efforts focused on curing HIV infection and sickle cell disease.

== 2020s ==
2021
The United Nations holds the 2021 high-level meeting on HIV/AIDS.
2022
City of Hope doctors announce that a fourth person in history has been cured of HIV through a stem cell transplant. The patient had cancer, of which he has also been cured. But the doctors warned the procedure cannot be made available on a large scale.
2023
PrEP implants in Rhesus macaque monkeys are reported as an additional possible future treatment to prevent HIV in humans. The implant's goal is to make PrEP easier to use for patients who have trouble adhering to a pill or injection timetable, and further avoid adverse drug reactions (in injections). Animals research with positive results, however, does not always fit into human conditions.
Researchers confirm that a fifth person, called the Düsseldorf patient, is cured from HIV. The fact was first announced at a conference in 2019, from which it had since been pending verification.
A male HIV patient based in Geneva is reported as having entered the virus' remission for 20 months, without taking antiretrovirals since November 2021. French and Swiss researchers treating him, however, said the treatment did not include receiving stem cells from a donor with the CCR5 mutation, which helped cure all the five previous patients, but only a bone marrow transplant, citing that as the reason why they still cannot rule out a viral rebound on him.
A clinical trial for a preventive HIV vaccine called VIR-1388 begins in the United States and South Africa. The vaccine aims to instruct T cells to recognize the HIV in the human body and start a reaction to keep it from creating a chronic infection. Initial results are expected to come out in late 2024.
2025
The second administration of President Donald Trump puts USAID on a 90-day freeze which involves putting PEPFAR on halt and taking its computer systems offline.
January 28 – the Trump administration grants a waiver for essential medicines and medical services which includes HIV medicines. However, it is later estimated that only about 50% of PEPFAR programs restarted in February.
June – In the U.S. Supreme Court case Kennedy v. Braidwood Management, Inc. the plaintiffs, including Braidwood Management, argued that the Affordable Care Act mandate requiring health plans to cover preventive services without cost-sharing violates their constitutional and religious rights. The plaintiffs specifically objected to coverage of Pre-exposure prophylaxis for HIV prevention (PrEP), an HIV prevention drug, citing religious objections to facilitating behavior they oppose, such as homosexual conduct and drug use. The plaintiffs made two major arguments. The first was that the United States Preventive Services Task Force (USPSTF), which recommends preventive services, was not properly appointed under the Appointments Clause, because this body makes binding recommendations without Senate-confirmed oversight. The second was that covering PrEP violates their religious beliefs in violation of the Religious Freedom Restoration Act, as they object to subsidizing what they view as morally objectionable behaviors. The Supreme Court ruled against the plaintiffs and remanded for further proceedings.
June - The FDA approves the use of 6 monthly injections of Lenacapavir, a drug made by Gilead Sciences, that has shown greater than 96% reduction in HIV risk across the trialed population. Stakeholders begin the practical work to secure lenacapavir supplies for at risk populations globally while Bill Clinton noted that lenacapavir was “a genuine chance to end” the HIV epidemic.

== See also ==
- History of HIV/AIDS
- Timeline of early HIV/AIDS cases
- Women and HIV/AIDS
