= Sandy Ford =

American drug technician, identifier of first known AIDS cluster

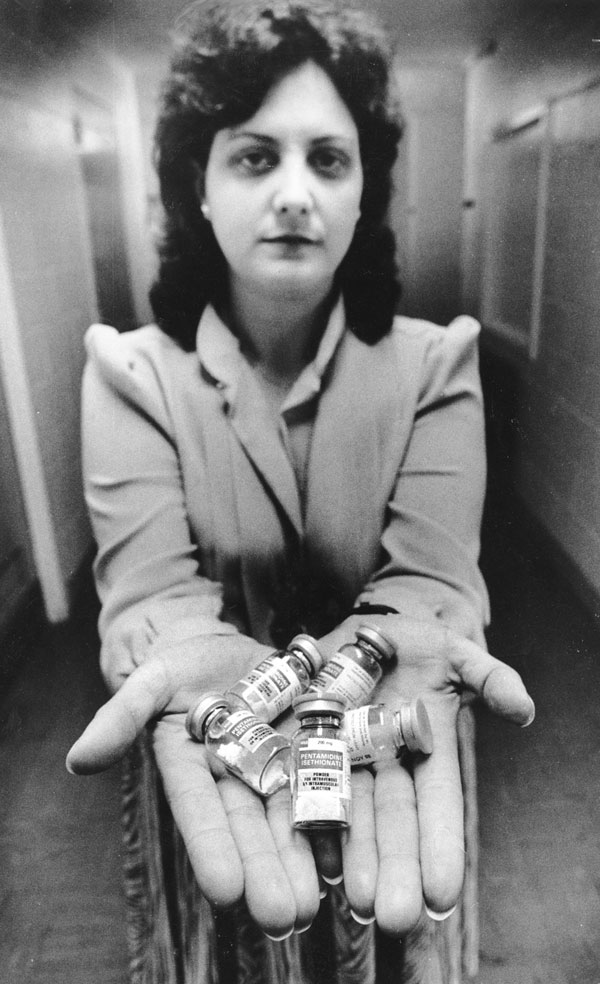
- Ford holding vials of pentamidine
- Born: Sandra Lee Garrison; July 11, 1950; Fresno, California, U.S.
- Died: April 11, 2015 (aged 64)
- Education: Fresno City College; California State University, Fresno
- Employer: Centers for Disease Control

Sandy Ford (born Sandra Lee Garrison, July 11, 1950 – April 11, 2015) was a drug technician for the Centers for Disease Control in Atlanta, Georgia. In April 1981, she identified unusual clusters of young homosexual patients in New York and California with pneumocystis pneumonia and Kaposi's sarcoma and alerted her supervisor about it. Those patients had HIV/AIDS; pneumocystis pneumonia and Kaposi's sarcoma were later found to be AIDS-defining diseases.

Ford was the first person to identify these clusters and the first to alert health officials about the coming epidemic.

== Early life ==
Ford was born and raised in Fresno, California. Her father, Melvin Edward Garrison, was a plumber; her mother, LaVerne Francis Martin Garrison, was a homemaker. She graduated from McLane High School and attended both Fresno City College and California State University, Fresno.

== Cluster discovery ==
Pneumocystis jirovecii cysts from bronchoalveolar lavage, stained with Toluidine blue O stain

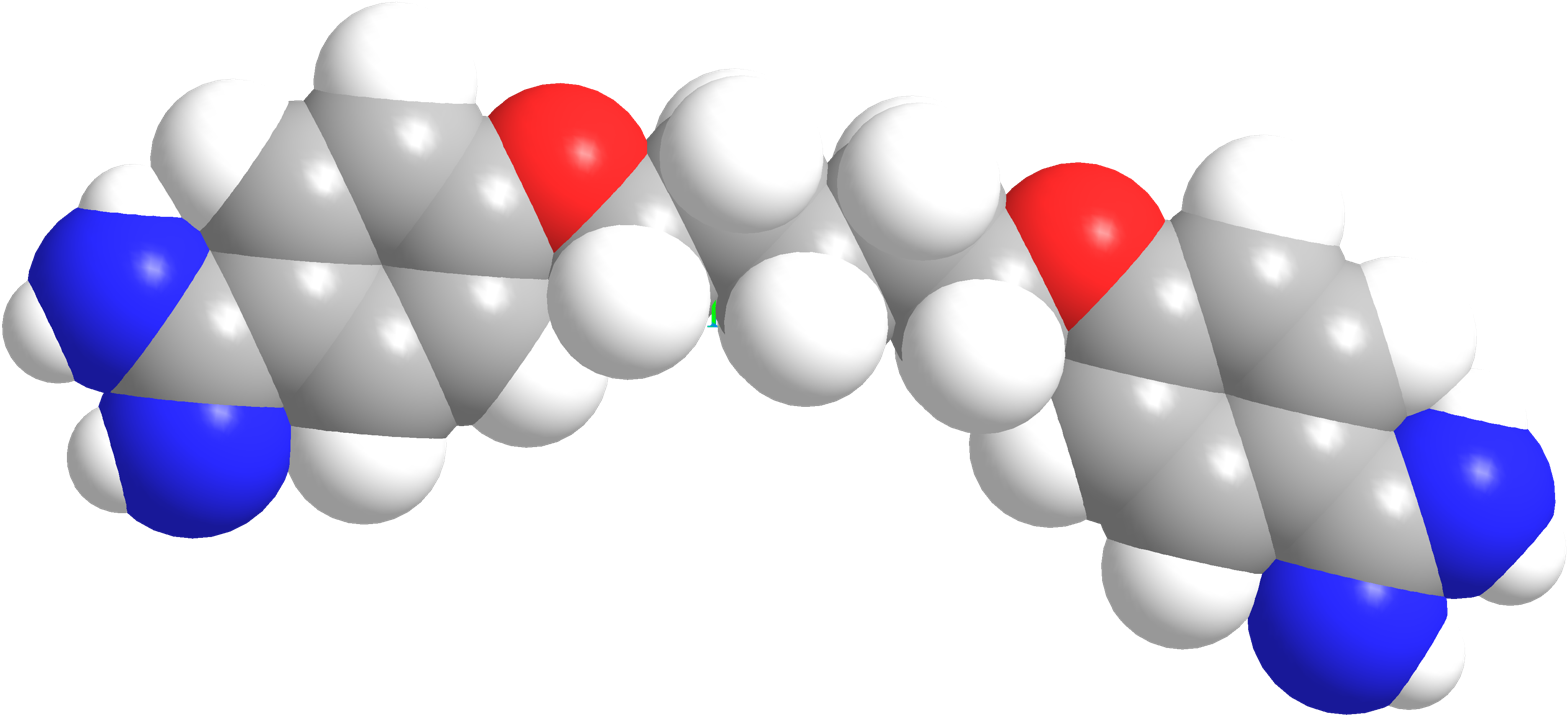
Molecular structure of pentamidine

In 1979, Ford moved to Atlanta and took a position at the Centers for Disease Control in the Parasitic Diseases Division. She administered the Parasitic Diseases Drug Service, a CDC program that maintains supplies of medicines for a number of diseases not common enough in the U.S. for private pharmaceutical companies to profitably go through the Food and Drug Administration approval process. These were mostly tropical diseases, such as African sleeping sickness, river blindness, schistosomiasis, tapeworm, and leishmaniasis. Doctors needing one of the medicines would contact Ford, who would get clearance from a CDC physician and arrange for the drug's delivery.

One of the drugs handled by the Parasitic Diseases Drug Service was pentamidine, an antimicrobial medication used to treat pneumocystis pneumonia. The service purchased its supply from the British chemical company May & Baker. Pneumocystis pneumonia is caused by a yeast-like fungus named Pneumocystis jirovecii. (At the time, Pneumocystis jirovecii was known as Pneumocystis carinii, and the resulting disease was commonly called Pneumocystis carinii pneumonia, abbreviated as PCP. Pneumocystis carinii was also believed at the time to be a parasite rather than a fungus.)

In the United States, pneumocystis pneumonia was very rare; as of a 1967 survey, there had only ever been 107 total recorded cases nationwide, all of them in immunosuppressed patients. But in February 1981, physician requests for pentamidine began to spike — and, unusually, the requests were for young male patients whose immune systems had no known reason to be suppressed. Ford handled nine such requests in a three-month period for young men in New York and California. One New York doctor requested pentamidine for five different patients during the first three weeks of April alone. "I figured he should go back to medical school if he couldn't find a simple neoplasm," Ford told journalist Randy Shilts later. "People just didn't need this drug unless there was an underlying diagnosis of immunosuppression."

That same physician also began requesting repeat doses of pentamidine for his patients. This was unprecedented, because the drug had previously always been effective with just a single dose. Soon after, a different New York doctor mentioned to Ford that five young gay men in the city had been diagnosed with Kaposi's sarcoma, a disease previously associated with elderly men in the Mediterranean, Eastern Europe, and Middle East.

Seeing a pattern, Ford took the cases to her boss, deputy director of parasitic disease Dennis Juranek, who asked her to write up her findings in a memo. She did so on April 28, 1981. That memo began the CDC's investigation of HIV/AIDS. It came three weeks before the first news story on the disease, which ran on May 18 in the gay newspaper New York Native.

A group of CDC epidemiologists began working on the unknown epidemic. An article titled "Pneumocystis pneumonia — Los Angeles" highlighted five cases in the June 5, 1981, issue of the Morbidity and Mortality Weekly Report, the CDC's newsletter on new public health information. This was the first reference to AIDS in the medical literature.

A July 3 article, titled "Kaposi's Sarcoma and Pneumocystis Pneumonia Among Homosexual Men — New York City and California," raised the number of case reports to 39 patients; another article on August 28 increased the number of known cases to 108.

Ford was able to detect the unusual clusters despite not being a physician or scientist. "Although she had no formal training in medical science," two CDC colleagues wrote in an obituary, "she had a prepared mind and thought like an epidemiologist."

One CDC doctor, Bruce Weniger, said he and his fellow physicians didn't notice the pattern of pneumonia patients with no apparent cause for their suppressed immune systems. "I do recall getting doctors saying the patient doesn't have any of those [underlying causes], and I didn't think anything of it...It was only Sandy who recognized that something was going on."

At some point, later in the 1980s, a CDC staffer taped a paper-napkin sign to the door of Ford's office, which was Room 161 in CDC Building 6. It read: "In this room in the spring of 1981, the epidemic of what later became known as Acquired Immunodeficiency Syndrome was discovered."

== Later life ==
Ford received a degree of national attention for her finding once the AIDS epidemic reached mainstream media. She is a significant figure in Randy Shilts' book And the Band Played On and she was interviewed for articles and documentaries.

Ford continued working at the CDC for 34 years, until retiring in 2008. She died April 11, 2015, at age 64.

== See also ==
- History of HIV/AIDS
- Timeline of HIV/AIDS
