= 1985 World Health Organization AIDS surveillance case definition =

The 1985 World Health Organization AIDS surveillance case definition (often called the Bangui definition) was developed in October 1985, at a conference of public health officials including representatives of the Centers for Disease Control (CDC) and World Health Organization (WHO) in Bangui, Central African Republic. It was developed as a criteria for disease surveillance in nine African nations where testing for HIV antibodies was not widely available at the time. The criteria was eventually adopted by various agencies in over 50 countries. The report emphasized the importance of developing cheap, reliable, and simple serological tests for diagnosis of HIV and surveillance of the virus.

== Purpose and use ==
For more information see: HIV/AIDS, History of HIV/AIDS, Timeline of HIV/AIDS

The HIV virus first emerged in the 1920s in the Belgian Congo (Now the Democratic Republic of the Congo) near Kinshasa. Danish physician and surgeon Grethe Rask began experiencing the symptoms of AIDS in 1975. By June 1981, the Centers for Disease Control in the United States began reporting on cancer clusters which would later be determined to be complications due to HIV. In March 1985, the FDA approved the first HIV test (an ELISA based test). By April 1987, a Western blot test was developed to confirm the results of an ELISA test for HIV (then called LAV/HTLV-III/ARV).

For developing countries, HIV surveillance was difficult. Many medical laboratories lacked electricity, making ELISA testing difficult due to a lack of light, refrigeration, and humidity control. Following a conference of medical professionals from Burundi, Cameroon, Central African Republic, Republic of the Congo, Gabon, Rwanda, Tanzania, Uganda, Zaire (now the Democratic Republic of the Congo), the criteria were developed. In October 1985, only three facilities in those nine nations could perform the recently developed HIV ELISA test. The Pasteur Institute in Burundi, the Institut National pour la Recherche Biomedicale in the DRC, and Centre International de Recherches Médicales de Franceville in Gabon. The most accurate method to monitoring the spread of a diseases is a serological survey. However, this method was impractical in a number of nations due to the number of cases, and lack of equipment and funds.

The Bangui definition was distributed after the conference as a method of identifying persons who were potentially seropositive for disease surveillance. The protocol reportedly between 60% and 90% effective in identifying persons with HIV. The criteria was left open a possible false positive for patients suffering from tuberculosis, however, the exclusion of "chronic cough" category significantly decreased that chance. A study of deceased patients in Kinshasa between 1988 and 1991 found that 64 of 68 patients who meet the WHO's Bangui definition were seropositive. A similar study in Uganda in 1988 found 83% of patients who meet the criteria were positive for HIV.

The criteria was updated in 1993 to include a low CD4+ T lymphocytes cell count.

== Criteria ==
The diagnosis of AIDS is established when the score is 12 or higher.

Exclusion criteria:

1. Pronounced malnutrition
2. Cancer
3. Immunosuppressive treatment

Inclusion criteria with the corresponding score	Score
Important signs	
Weight loss exceeding 10% of body weight	4
Protracted asthenia	4
Very frequent signs	
Continuous or repeated attacks of fever for more than a month	3
Diarrhoea lasting for more than a month	3
Other signs	
Cough (often excluded)	2
Pneumopathy	2
Oropharyngeal candidiasis	4
Chronic or relapsing cutaneous herpes	4
Generalized pruritic dermatosis	4
Herpes zoster (relapsing)	4
Generalized adenopathy	2
Neurological signs	2
Generalized Kaposi's sarcoma	12
