= Gaëtan Dugas =

Canadian flight attendant and early AIDS victim (1952–1984)

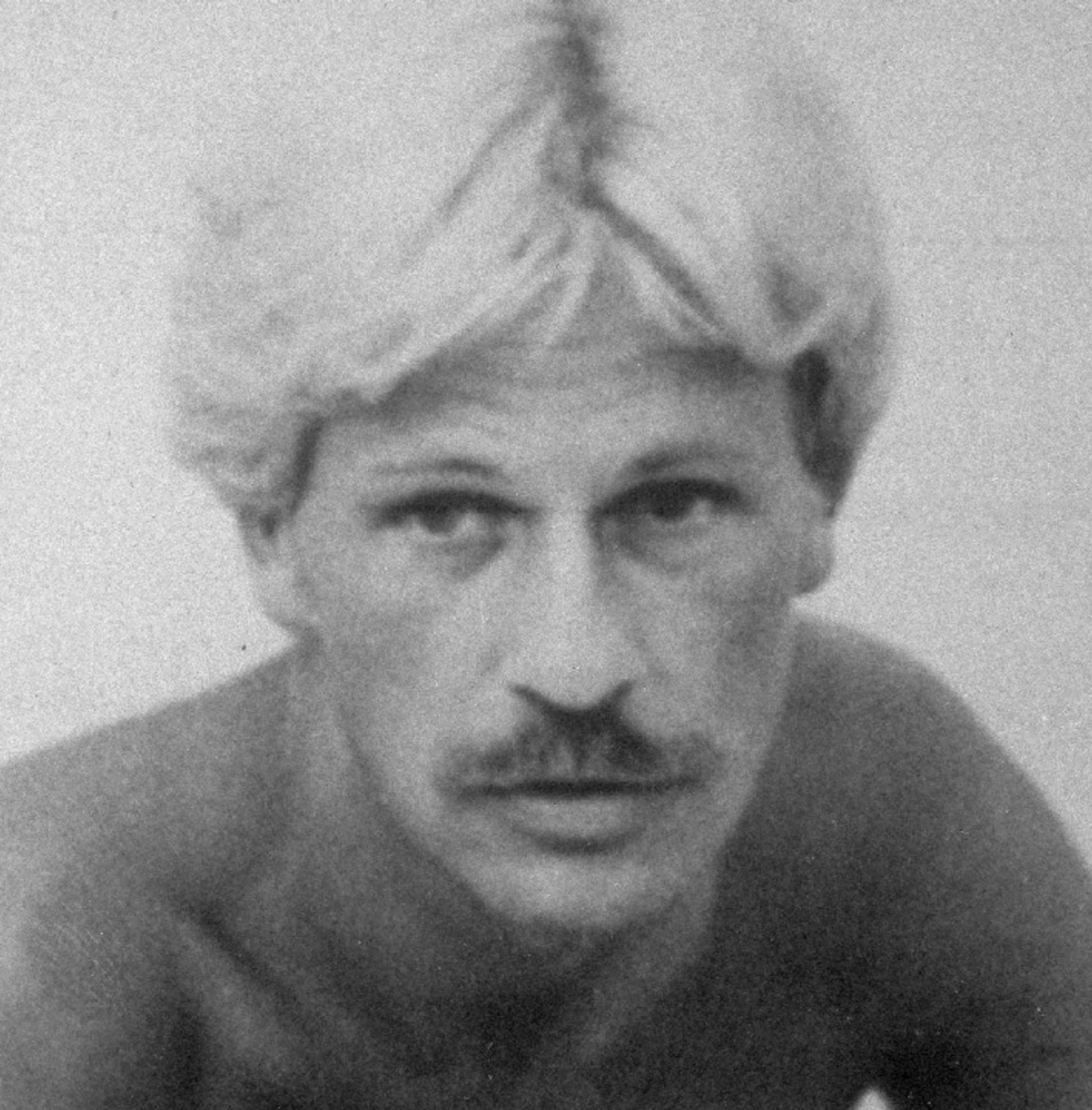
- Born: February 20, 1952; Quebec City, Canada
- Died: March 30, 1984 (aged 32); Quebec City, Canada
- Cause of death: Kidney failure due to AIDS-related infections
- Other names: Patient O, Patient Zero
- Occupation: Flight attendant
- Known for: Long misdescribed as "Patient Zero" of the North American AIDS epidemic

Gaëtan Dugas (French: [ɡaetɑ̃ dyɡa]; February 20, 1952 – March 30, 1984) was a Canadian flight attendant widely claimed to be "patient zero" for the North American AIDS epidemic, as popularized notably by Randy Shilts's 1987 book And the Band Played On. The claim has been refuted through subsequent scientific scrutiny. Genetic analysis later determined that several thousand gay men already had HIV in the United States prior to Dugas' own infection.

Dugas worked as a flight attendant for Air Canada. He died in Quebec City in March 1984 as a result of kidney failure caused by AIDS-related infections. In March 1984, a study tracked Dugas, along with other gay and bisexual men, to indicate his role in a particular cluster of 40 AIDS cases in the United States. He was named "Patient O" with "O" standing for "Out-of-California".

And the Band Played On later used the term "Patient 0" standing for "zero" and put significant media focus on Dugas. A 2016 study conducted via genetic analysis of stored blood samples, and supported by historical detective work, confirmed that Dugas was not Patient Zero and was not responsible for bringing HIV to the United States.

== Early life ==
Dugas was born 1952. Adopted by a large family, he grew up in the L'Ancienne-Lorette suburb of Quebec City near the airport. As a young adult he trained and worked as hairdresser, but wanted to travel. He moved to Vancouver at 20 years of age to improve his English and landed a job with Air Canada in 1974.

== 1984 cluster study ==
A 1984 paper linked 40 AIDS patients by sexual contact. Of those patients, Dugas was the first to experience an onset of symptoms of AIDS. In the above graph, Dugas is represented by the number 0. Because Dugas was very forthcoming in helping researchers, Michael Worobey concludes there may be ascertainment bias in the study.

A 1984 Centers for Disease Control and Prevention (CDC) study published in The American Journal of Medicine titled Cluster of Cases of the Acquired Immune Deficiency Syndrome, examined the sexual contacts of gay men infected with AIDS to determine if their histories were consistent with the hypothesis that AIDS was caused by an infectious agent. A graph included with the paper traced the sequence of infection among 40 men, and labelled one of the nodes as "Patient 0", with other nodes including the place of residence and a number indicating the sequence in which they developed AIDS symptoms, such as "NY 14". The paper later stated:

If the infectious-agent hypothesis is true, Patient 0 may be an example of a "carrier" of such an agent. He had had sexual contact with eight other AIDS patients and was the possible source of AIDS for at least three of them. Two of these three men had been his partners before he had overt signs of Kaposi's sarcoma.

== "Patient Zero" designation ==
Dugas is featured prominently in Randy Shilts' 1987 book And the Band Played On: Politics, People, and the AIDS Epidemic (1987), which documents the outbreak of the AIDS epidemic in the United States. Shilts refers to Dugas as "Patient Zero" and portrays him as having almost sociopathic behaviour by allegedly intentionally infecting, or at least recklessly endangering, others with the virus. Shilts interviewed epidemiologist Selma Dritz, who reported that in 1982, she informed Dugas that he was infecting other people, but he refused to cease having casual sex in spite of this.

Dugas is described as being a charming, handsome sexual athlete, who according to his own estimation, averaged hundreds of sex partners per year. He claimed to have had over 2,500 sexual partners across North America since becoming sexually active in 1972. In David France's 2016 book How to Survive a Plague, Shilts' editor expressed his regret for having "made a conscious decision to vilify Dugas in the book and publicity campaign in order to spur sales."

== Re-examination ==
A number of authorities have since voiced reservations about the implications of the CDC's Patient Zero study and characterizations of Dugas as being responsible for bringing HIV to cities such as Los Angeles and San Francisco. In the Patient Zero study, the average length of time between sexual contact and the onset of symptoms was 10 1/2 months. While Shilts' book does not make such an allegation, the rumour that Dugas was the principal disseminator of the virus became widespread. In 1988, Andrew R. Moss published an opposing view in The New York Review of Books.

In 2016, a group of researchers led by evolutionary biologist Michael Worobey conducted a genetic study that looked at blood samples taken from gay and bisexual men in 1978 and 1979 as part of a hepatitis B study, and based on the results of the data, concluded that Dugas was not the source of the virus in the United States. "On the family tree of the virus, Dugas fell in the middle, not at the beginning." "Beliefs about Patient Zero", Worobey concludes, "are unsupported by scientific data." Worobey's paper, published in Nature in October 2016, finds "neither biological nor historical evidence that he was the primary case in the United States or for subtype B as a whole."

A study by historian Richard McKay of Cambridge and others identified several causes for the Patient Zero myth. During early CDC analysis of cases in California, patient 057 (Dugas) was nicknamed patient "O" for "Out-of-California", but this was interpreted by others as Patient Zero. Dugas was particularly helpful in tracing his network of partners, providing names and addresses for many of them, which was further expanded because others remembered his distinctive name. Although many of the patients analysed reported in excess of 1,000 sexual partners, most remembered "only a handful" of names, making their contacts to other cases more difficult to trace.

Richard McKay later extended this study into a book, Patient Zero and the Making of the AIDS Epidemic. This book contains the most definitive biography of Dugas' life, constructed through interviews with friends, family, and lovers. Robert M. Grant, an AIDS researcher at the University of California, has stated: "No one wants to be the Patient Zero of their village. But this may be helpful because it says, 'Just because you are the first to be diagnosed doesn't mean you started the epidemic.'"

Gay activist Larry Kramer argued that Dugas' promiscuous lifestyle was nonetheless "irresponsible", and that the finding did not change his opinion of Dugas.

Two films, John Greyson's musical comedy film Zero Patience (1993) and Laurie Lynd's documentary Killing Patient Zero (2019), have discussed the Patient Zero myth around Dugas.

== Portrayal in film ==
Dugas was played by Jeffrey Nordling in the 1993 HBO adaptation of And the Band Played On. In the 2021 Channel 4 TV Series It's A Sin, Harry Clayton-Wright plays an unnamed flight attendant, widely believed to be a reference to Dugas.

== See also ==
- Timeline of early HIV/AIDS cases
- Timeline of HIV/AIDS
- Robert Rayford, a 16-year-old boy who died in 1969 and may have been the first case of AIDS in the United States.
- Mary Mallon, better known as "Typhoid Mary", an Irish-American cook widely blamed for the spread of typhoid fever in 1900s New York
