= Timeline of early HIV/AIDS cases =

HIV/AIDS was recognised as a novel illness in the early 1980s. An AIDS case is classified as "early" if the death occurred before 5 June 1981, when the AIDS epidemic was formally recognized by medical professionals in the United States.

== Virus origins ==
All known subgroups of HIV-1 and HIV-2 are thought to have entered humans as distinct cross-species transmissions of simian immunodeficiency virus (SIV) from primates.

SIV exists as distinct lineages that cluster in different species of primates. HIV-1 is most similar to the SIV found in common chimpanzees (SIVcpz) in southeastern Cameroon, giving rise to the notion that HIV-1 emerged from chimpanzees in this area. SIVcpz itself emerged in chimpanzees as the result of a recombination of two separate lineages of SIV known to infect red-capped mangabey, and Cercopithecus species.

== Early 20th century ==
HIV-1 group M (responsible for the global pandemic) is estimated to have emerged in humans around 1920 near Kinshasa, then part of the Belgian Congo. This estimation was the result of time-scaled evolutionary models being applied to modern samples and retrieved early samples of HIV-1 (M). It had previously been estimated from the genetic differences between LEO70 and DRC60 samples and later samples that HIV-1 group M had jumped into humans in 1908 ± 10 years.

== 1950s ==
The earliest known sample of HIV-1 is from Kinshasa, Democratic Republic of the Congo (DRC) (formerly Zaire, formerly the Belgian Congo). The sample, designated LEO70, was isolated from the plasma of "an adult Bantu male" who also had a sickle cell trait and G6PDD, in 1959. At the time of the sample's isolation, he was living in Léopoldville, Belgian Congo. The isolated strain was found to be most closely related to modern genome sequences of HIV-1 (M) subgroup D.

Possible cases of AIDS from this period include:

- Richard Edwin Graves Jr., a 28-year-old World War II veteran who had been stationed in the Solomon Islands. Graves died on 26 July 1952 in Memphis, Tennessee with pneumocystis pneumonia and a human cytomegalovirus infection. Some authors suggest this constitutes a sufficient number of opportunistic infections for a clinical course suggestive of an AIDS diagnosis.
- David Carr, a Manchester printer (sometimes mistakenly referred to as a sailor) who died on 31 August 1959 following the failure of his immune system; he succumbed to pneumonia. Baffled by what he had died from, doctors preserved 50 of his tissue samples for inspection. In 1990, the tissues were found to be HIV-positive. However, in 1992, a second test by AIDS researcher David Ho found that the strain of HIV which was present in the tissues was similar to the strain of HIV which was found in tissue samples which were collected and analyzed in the late 1980s rather than an earlier strain of HIV, which would have mutated considerably over the course of 30 years. Ho's discovery has cast doubt on the theory that Carr's death was caused by AIDS.
- Ardouin Antonio, a 49-year-old Jamaican-born Haitian, has been suggested as a possible early AIDS case. Antonio had emigrated to the United States in 1927, and at the time of his death, he was working as a shipping clerk for a garment manufacturer in Manhattan. He developed symptoms which were similar to the symptoms which David Carr developed, and he died on 28 June 1959, apparently of the same very rare kind of pneumonia that killed Carr. Many years later, Gordon R. Hennigar, who had performed the autopsy on Antonio's body, was asked whether or not he thought his patient had died of AIDS; he replied "You bet ... It was so unusual at the time. Lord knows how many cases of AIDS have been autopsied that we didn't even know had AIDS. I think it's such a strong possibility that I've often thought about getting them to send me the tissue samples."

Researchers begin to note the spread of Pneumocystis pneumonia and concurrent Cytomegalovirus infections, considered novel to the European continent, and both AIDS-related conditions. Some of these cases occurred in infants considered immunocompetent.

== 1960s ==
In 1960, a woman in modern-day Kinshasa, Democratic Republic of the Congo (DRC) (formerly Zaire, formerly the Belgian Congo) died, and a lymph node sample was taken and fixed with formaldehyde and preserved in paraffin. In 2008, the sample was tested by researchers, identifying partial HIV viral sequences. The specimen, named DRC60 contained a strain of HIV-1 around 88% similar to LEO70, but was found to be most closely related to HIV-1 (M) subgroup A isolates. These two specimens are significant not only because they are the oldest known specimens of HIV-1, but because they show that the virus already had an extensive amount of genetic diversity by 1960.

Robert Rayford, a 16-year-old boy who died in 1969, is considered to be the first recorded case of AIDS in the United States.

== 1970s ==
Researchers sampled blood from 75 children in Uganda to serve as controls for a study of Burkitt lymphoma. In 1985, retroactive testing of the frozen blood serum indicated that 50 of the children had antibodies to a virus related to HIV.

Arvid Darre Noe (an anagram of his birth name Arne Vidar Røed) was a Norwegian sailor and truck driver who was probably infected in Cameroon some time between 1962 and 1965, and died on 24 April 1976. His eight-year-old daughter had died three months earlier, and his wife died in December 1976. Tissues of Røed, his wife and daughter all tested positive for HIV-1 type O, in an epidemiology study in 1988.

Grethe Rask was a Danish surgeon who traveled to Zaire in 1964 then again in 1972 to aid the sick. She was likely directly exposed to blood from many Congolese patients, one of whom infected her. She became unwell in 1974, then returned to Denmark in 1977, with her colleagues baffled by her symptoms. She died of Pneumocystis pneumonia in December 1977. Her tissues were examined and tested by her colleagues and found positive in 1987.

A Portuguese man was treated at the Hospital for Tropical Diseases in London by Anthony Bryceson until he died of the disease in 1978. He is the first confirmed case of HIV-2 and it is believed he was exposed to the disease in Guinea-Bissau, where he lived between 1956 and 1966.

== See also ==
- List of HIV-positive people
- History of HIV/AIDS
- Timeline of HIV/AIDS
