= 1994 expanded World Health Organization AIDS case definition =

The 1994 expanded World Health Organization AIDS case definition came around through the developments in the understanding of the spectrum of severe HIV-related illness both in developed and developing countries, and the increased availability of laboratory diagnostic methods, a meeting was convened in Geneva, Switzerland by the World Health Organization Global Programme on AIDS to review the 1985 World Health Organization AIDS surveillance case definition (Bangui definition) and to modify and expand them for use in adults and adolescents. Both the 1985 World Health Organization AIDS surveillance case definition and the 1994 expanded World Health Organization AIDS case definition are case definitions for AIDS surveillance and not for clinically staging HIV infection.

The main change from the Bangui definition is the addition of an HIV test for HIV antibody. If this test gives a positive result and one or more of the following conditions, the individual is considered to have AIDS.

- > 10% body weight loss or cachexia, with diarrhoea or fever, or both, intermittent or constant for at least 1 month, not known to be due to a condition unrelated to HIV infection.
- cryptococcal meningitis
- pulmonary or extra-pulmonary tuberculosis
- Kaposi's sarcoma
- neurological impairment that is sufficient to prevent independent daily activities, not known to be due to a condition unrelated to HIV infection (for example, trauma, or cerebrovascular accident).
- candidiasis of the oesophagus (which may be presumptively diagnosed based on the presence of oral candidiasis accompanied by dysphagia.
- clinically diagnosed life-threatening or recurrent episodes of pneumonia, with or without etiological confirmation
- invasive cervical cancer

In a study comparing the 1994 expanded case definition with the clinical definition, the expanded case definition was found to reduce false negatives by including a greater range of symptoms, as well as reduce false positives through inclusion of the HIV antibody test.
