= Arvid Noe =

Norwegian sailor and trucker, the earliest confirmed case of HIV/AIDS in Europe

Arvid Darre Noe
- Born: Arne Vidar Røed; 23 July 1946; Norway
- Died: 24 April 1976 (aged 29); Horten, Vestfold, Norway
- Cause of death: AIDS-related complications
- Resting place: Borre Cemetery
- Occupations: Sailor, truck driver
- Known for: First named person known to have contracted HIV
- Children: 3

Arne Vidar Røed (23 July 1946 – 24 April 1976), known in medical literature by the anagram Arvid Darre Noe, was a Norwegian sailor and truck driver who contracted one of the earliest confirmed cases of HIV/AIDS. He was the first confirmed HIV case in Europe, though the disease was not identified at the time of his death.

The virus spread to his wife and youngest daughter, both of whom also died. It was the first documented cluster of AIDS cases before the AIDS epidemic of the early 1980s.

The researchers studying the cases referred to Røed as the "Norwegian sailor", or the anagram "Arvid Darre Noe" to conceal his identity. His true name, Arne Vidar Røed, became known long after his death.

== Illness and death ==
Røed began his career in the merchant navy in 1961, at the age of 15. As established by the journalist Edward Hooper, Røed visited Africa twice during his travels, the first time from 1961 to 1962 on board the Hoegh Aronde, along the west coast of Africa to Douala, Cameroon. On this trip, Røed contracted gonorrhea.

By 1968, Røed was no longer a sailor and was working as a long haul truck driver throughout Europe, mainly in West Germany.

Beginning in 1968, Røed suffered from joint pain, lymphedema, and lung infections. This was also the year American teenager Robert Rayford first presented with similar symptoms, who was later identified as the first North American AIDS case.

Røed's condition stabilized with treatment until 1975, when his symptoms worsened. He developed motor control difficulties and dementia and died on 24 April 1976.

His wife grew ill with similar symptoms, and died in December 1976. Their two older children were not born infected. Their third child, a daughter, died on 4 January 1976, at the age of eight, and was the first person documented to have died of AIDS outside the United States.

Røed, his wife, and his daughter were buried in Borre, Vestfold, Norway.

== Later investigations ==
Approximately a decade after Røed's death, tests by Stig Frøland of the Oslo National Hospital concluded that blood samples from Røed, his daughter and wife all tested positive for HIV.

Based on research conducted after his death, Røed is believed to have contracted HIV in Cameroon in 1961 or 1962, where he was known to have been sexually active with many African women, including sex workers. Røed was infected with HIV-1 group O, which is known to have been prevalent in Cameroon in the early 1960s.

== See also ==
- Gaëtan Dugas — A Canadian flight attendant whose role in the early years of the AIDS epidemic attracted considerable attention. He was once labelled "Patient Zero" in a 1984 cluster study and identified as such by author Randy Shilts. This claim has been refuted through subsequent scientific scrutiny and historical re-evaluation.
- Grethe Rask — A Danish physician infected in 1964 in Congo-Léopoldville (now DR Congo) or in 1972 while performing surgery. Died in 1977
- Robert Rayford — An American teenager from St. Louis, Missouri whose death in 1969 may have been the first AIDS fatality in North America.
- Timeline of early HIV/AIDS cases
