= Grethe Rask =

Danish surgeon, one of the earliest non-Africans to die of AIDS

Margrethe P. Rask
- Born: 1930; Thisted, Denmark
- Died: 12 December 1977 (aged 46–47); Copenhagen, Denmark
- Cause of death: AIDS-related complications
- Years active: 1964–1977
- Known for: One of the first non-Africans to die of HIV/AIDS
- Medical career
- Profession: Surgeon

Margrethe P. Rask (1930 – 12 December 1977), better known as Grethe Rask, was a Danish physician and surgeon in Zaïre, now the Democratic Republic of the Congo. After setting up her own hospital in the village of Abumombazi in 1972, she transferred to Danish Red Cross Hospital in Kinshasa in 1975. She returned to Denmark in 1977 after developing symptoms of an unknown infectious disease, which was later discovered to be AIDS. In June 1981, the Centers for Disease Control recognized AIDS. Rask was one of the first non-Africans, along with Arvid Noe and Robert Rayford, and one of the first women known to have died of AIDS-related causes.

== Early years and Zaïre (1930–1974) ==
Born in 1930 in the Danish town of Thisted, Rask practiced medicine in Zaïre for a brief period in 1964, when she was recalled to Europe for training in stomach surgery and tropical illnesses. From 1972 to 1977, she practiced medicine first at a small local hospital in the Zairian town of Abumombazi, and from 1975, as the chief surgeon at the Danish Red Cross Hospital in Kinshasa.

She was likely first exposed to HIV in 1964. Her friend and colleague, Ib Bygbjerg, a physician specializing in communicable diseases, wrote in a 1983 letter to The Lancet that "while working as a surgeon under primitive conditions, she [Rask] must have been heavily exposed to blood and excretions of African patients."

== Illness and death (1975–1977) ==
Starting in late 1974, Rask suffered from symptoms of AIDS, including diarrhea, swollen lymph nodes, weight loss, and fatigue. Although the symptoms receded temporarily following drug treatments in 1975, they later grew considerably worse.

In July 1977, following a vacation in South Africa, she could no longer breathe and relied on bottled oxygen. She flew back to Denmark, where further testing over the next several months at Copenhagen's Rigshospitalet would reveal a number of opportunistic infections, such as Staphylococcus albus bacteremia, candidiasis, and (upon autopsy) Pneumocystis jiroveci pneumonia (PJP, a fungal infection of the lungs formerly known as Pneumocystis carinii pneumonia).

Tests also showed that Rask had a nearly non-existent T-cell count, leading to a severely depressed immune system. At the time, the doctors treating Rask were at a loss to explain her disease progression which, in retrospect, came to be seen as one of the first cases of AIDS recorded outside Africa.

After numerous tests and unsuccessful treatments, she returned home to her cottage on a fjord in November 1977.

In December, she was called back for more tests, and returned to the Rigshospitalet in Copenhagen where she remained until she died of AIDS-related Pneumocystis jirovecii pneumonia on 12 December 1977.

In 1984, her blood was tested for HIV in Denmark. The test was negative. In 1987, a sample of her blood was sent to the United States, where it was tested with two different systems. Both tests were positive for HIV.

== See also ==
- Timeline of early AIDS cases
