= Robert Rayford =

American teenager thought to be the first death from AIDS in North America (1953–1969)

Robert Lee Rayford
- Born: February 3, 1953; St. Louis, Missouri, U.S.
- Died: May 15, 1969 (aged 16); St. Louis, Missouri, U.S.
- Known for: Possible first known AIDS death in the United States

Robert Lee Rayford (February 3, 1953 – May 15, 1969) sometimes identified as Robert R. due to his age, was an American teenager from St. Louis, Missouri whose chronic illness, which began in 1966 and ended with his death in 1969, are hypothesized to represent the earliest known case of HIV/AIDS in North America. Rayford's death was a mystery to his doctors, who could not account for his symptoms. A likely cause of his death wasn't suggested until 1987.

Rayford's reported symptoms during his illness – which included emaciation, Kaposi's sarcoma, and pneumonia – have been suggested to resemble the symptomatology of AIDS-related complex. A paper published in 1988 reported that Western blot testing of Rayford's preserved tissues revealed the presence of nine different antibodies to HIV-1. In a subsequent letter to the journal Nature, study author Robert Garry stated: "Proviral DNA has recently been detected in his tissues by PCR in collaboration with J. Sninsky and S. Kwok (Cetus Corporation, Emeryville, California) but nucleotide sequence analysis is not yet complete." No such data was ever published by Sninsky and Kwok and no peer-reviewed publication subsequently reported the direct detection of HIV genetic material in Rayford's tissue samples using more modern immunoassay or DNA sequencing methods. The only published evidence of HIV positive status was derived from the very early antibody tests used experimentally on tissue samples. These tissue samples, which were kept in freezer storage at Tulane University in New Orleans, were lost in 2005 when the samples thawed and decayed after the storage facility was damaged by Hurricane Katrina.

Rayford's symptoms and the later reported detection of HIV antibodies in tissue samples has been posited to represent evidence of the presence of HIV/AIDS in North America prior to the beginning of the main HIV epidemic of the 1970s and 1980s. However, the presence of HIV was only inferred from the comparatively rudimentary antibody testing available in the 1980s, and—for reasons that are unclear—the samples were not definitively reanalyzed using more modern testing methods before their loss, leading Anthony Fauci to note that Rayford's status as the first identified case of HIV infection in North America was not "absolute[ly] nailed-down".

== Background ==
Robert Rayford was born on February 3, 1953, in St. Louis, Missouri. His mother Constance raised Robert and his sibling as a single parent. The Rayfords lived in the Old North neighborhood of St. Louis. Little is known about his personal life and no photographs of Rayford have ever been released by his family or are otherwise known to exist.

== Illness ==
The former St Louis City Hospital, where Rayford was first treated.

In early 1968, Rayford, then 15 years old, admitted himself to the City Hospital in St. Louis. His legs and genitals were covered in warts and sores. He had severe swelling of the testicles and pelvic region, which later spread to his legs, causing a misdiagnosis of lymphedema. He had grown thin and pale and suffered from shortness of breath. Rayford told the doctors that he had experienced these symptoms since at least late 1966. Tests discovered a severe chlamydia infection which had, unusually, spread throughout his body. Rayford declined a rectal examination request from hospital personnel, and was described as uncommunicative and withdrawn.

Memory Elvin-Lewis, a doctor assigned to his case, recalled Rayford's shy and hesitant personality: "He was the typical 15-year-old who is not going to talk to adults, especially when I'm white and he's black. He was not a communicative individual. He knew the minute I walked into the room that I wanted something more from him—more blood, more lymph fluid, more something."

Rayford gave contradictory statements regarding his sexual history. At one point Rayford claimed he was "the stud of all time". At another point he claimed a young woman from his neighborhood was his only sexual partner, and attributed his condition to sexual contact with her. Physicians treating Rayford for chlamydia and Kaposi's sarcoma thought his symptoms were consistent with having contracted the infections through being the recipient of anal intercourse and suspected that Rayford engaged in prostitution. Later authors have also speculated on the possibility of Rayford contracting the virus as a victim of child sexual abuse.

Eventually, he was moved to Barnes Hospital. In late 1968, Rayford's condition seemed to stabilize, but by March 1969 his symptoms reappeared and worsened. He had increased difficulty breathing and his white blood cell count had plummeted. The doctors found that his immune system was dysfunctional. He developed a fever and died of pneumonia on May 15, 1969.

== Autopsy ==
An autopsy of Rayford's body, which was led by William Drake, uncovered several abnormalities. Small purplish lesions were discovered on Rayford's left thigh and in his internal soft tissue, including "of the rectum and anus." Drake concluded that the lesions were Kaposi's sarcoma, a rare type of cancer which mostly affected elderly men of Mediterranean or Ashkenazi Jewish ancestry, but was almost unheard of among black teenagers. Kaposi's sarcoma was later designated an AIDS-defining illness.

These findings baffled the attending doctors. In 1973, a review of the case was published in the medical journal Lymphology.

== Later investigations ==
=== Tests ===
The HIV virus, originally called "lymphadenopathy-associated virus", was first discovered in 1983, and at the time, it was rapidly spreading in the gay male communities of New York City and Los Angeles. In June 1987, Marlys Witte, one of the doctors who, like Elvin-Lewis, had cared for Rayford before his death and also assisted in the autopsy, suspected that Rayford may have had an early infection with HIV and sent frozen tissue samples to Tulane University virologist Robert F. Garry. Garry and colleagues tested the tissue samples again using Western blot, the most sensitive test then available. The Western blot test found that antibodies against all nine detectable HIV proteins were present in Rayford's blood. An antigen capture assay identified HIV antigens in tissue samples, but not in serum.

In 1999, a conference abstract reported a study of testing for HIV DNA in Rayford's samples. The abstract reported the detection of HIV genes in Rayford's samples, which were very similar to the HIV IIIB isolate, which was discovered in France in the 1980s and became widely used as a laboratory reference isolate.

The last known tissue samples of Rayford were in a New Orleans lab and inadvertently destroyed during Hurricane Katrina in 2005, preventing further testing.

=== Impact on AIDS origin research ===
Rayford never traveled outside the Midwestern United States and had not ventured into cities such as New York City, Los Angeles, or San Francisco, where the HIV-AIDS epidemic was first observed in the United States. He also told doctors that he had never received a blood transfusion. Though some internet sources speculate that Rayford was sexually abused by and contracted HIV from his grandfather, both of Rayford's grandparents died in 1966 from causes not attributable to HIV; his grandfather, Percy Rayford, died from a "Laceration of pulmonary artery due to trauma with cardiac tamponade" with a contributing cause of heart disease, and his grandmother, Sadie, died eight months later from "cardiac failure with acute pulmonary edema with a contributing cause of pulmonary congestion. Rayford's case has been suggested to represent an early but isolated case of HIV transmission, which would indicate HIV may have been introduced to the United States several times before developing into a large-scale pandemic. Notably, the genetic HIV sequence reported by Robert Garry and colleagues in a conference abstract in 1999 wouldn't be consistent with this scenario because it largely matched HIV circulating in France in the 1980s.

== See also ==
- Arvid Noe, the earliest known European AIDS case
- Index case
- History of HIV/AIDS
- Timeline of early AIDS cases
- Timeline of HIV/AIDS
