= 46th Primetime Emmy Awards =

1994 American television programming awards

- Date: September 11, 1994 (Ceremony); September 10, 1994 (Creative Arts Awards)
- Location: Pasadena Civic Auditorium, Pasadena, California
- Presented by: Academy of Television Arts and Sciences
- Hosted by: Patricia Richardson; Ellen DeGeneres

Highlights
- Most awards: Frasier (4)
- Most nominations: NYPD Blue (17)
- Outstanding Comedy Series: Frasier
- Outstanding Drama Series: Picket Fences
- Outstanding Miniseries: Prime Suspect III
- Outstanding Variety Series: Late Show with David Letterman

Television/radio coverage
- Network: ABC

The 46th Primetime Emmy Awards were held on Sunday, September 11, 1994. The ceremony was hosted by Patricia Richardson and Ellen DeGeneres. It was broadcast on ABC and presented 27 awards. Comedy Central received its first major nomination at this ceremony.

For its first season, the Cheers spin-off Frasier won Outstanding Comedy Series and four total major awards. For the second straight year Picket Fences won Outstanding Drama Series, it too won four major awards, but the more impressive drama series was newcomer NYPD Blue, which took home three major awards.

NYPD Blue came into the ceremony with 17 major nominations. This broke Hill Street Blues record for most nominations by a drama or comedy series of 16 set in 1982, and put it in second place all time behind Roots which gained 21 major nominations in 1977. NYPD Blue set another milestone when it received every nomination for Outstanding Writing in a Drama Series, this marked only the ninth time that a show had received every nomination in a category. This feat has not been accomplished since.

The television film And the Band Played On also made Emmy history. It set a new record when it received nine major nominations, the most ever for a television movie. The record was maintained for twenty years, until The Normal Heart received nine major nominations in 2014. Both films won the top prize, but each lost all six of their acting nominations, directing, and writing to other projects.

== Winners and nominees ==
=== Programs ===
Outstanding Comedy Series: Frasier (NBC); Home Improvement (ABC); The Larry Sanders Show (HBO); Mad About You (NBC); Seinfeld (NBC)	Outstanding Drama Series: Picket Fences (CBS); Law & Order (NBC); Northern Exposure (CBS); NYPD Blue (ABC); Star Trek: The Next Generation (Syndicated)
Outstanding Variety, Music or Comedy Series: Late Show with David Letterman (CBS); Dennis Miller Live (HBO); MTV Unplugged (MTV) (Episode: "10,000 Maniacs"); Saturday Night Live (NBC); The Tonight Show with Jay Leno (NBC)	Outstanding Variety, Music, or Comedy Special: The Kennedy Center Honors: A Celebration of the Performing Arts (CBS); The 47th Annual Tony Awards (CBS); The 66th Annual Academy Awards (ABC); Comic Relief VI (HBO); Tracey Ullman Takes on New York (HBO)
Outstanding Made for Television Movie: And the Band Played On (HBO); Breathing Lessons (CBS); Gypsy (CBS); A Place for Annie (ABC); To Dance with the White Dog (CBS)	Outstanding Miniseries: Prime Suspect III (PBS); Oldest Living Confederate Widow Tells All (CBS); The Stand (ABC); Tales of the City (PBS); World War II: When Lions Roared (NBC)

=== Acting ===
==== Lead performances ====
Outstanding Lead Actor in a Comedy Series: Kelsey Grammer as Dr. Frasier Crane in Frasier (NBC) (Episode: "The Good Son"); John Goodman as Dan Conner in Roseanne (ABC) (Episode: "Guilt By Imagination"); John Larroquette as John Hemingway in The John Larroquette Show (NBC) (Episode: "Pilot"); Paul Reiser as Paul Buchman in Mad About You (NBC) (Episode: "Virtual Reality"); Jerry Seinfeld as Jerry Seinfeld in Seinfeld (NBC) (Episode: "The Puffy Shirt")	Outstanding Lead Actress in a Comedy Series: Candice Bergen as Murphy Brown on Murphy Brown (CBS) (Episode: "It's Just Like Riding a Bike"); Roseanne Barr as Roseanne Conner in Roseanne (ABC) (Episode: "The Driver's Seat"); Helen Hunt as Jamie Buchman in Mad About You (NBC) (Episode: "Cold Feet"); Annie Potts as Dana Palladino in Love & War (CBS) (Episode: "I've Got a Crush on You"); Patricia Richardson as Jill Taylor in Home Improvement (ABC) (Episode: "The Colonel")
Outstanding Lead Actor in a Drama Series: Dennis Franz as Andy Sipowicz in NYPD Blue (ABC) (Episode: "NYPD Lou"); David Caruso as John Kelly in NYPD Blue (ABC) (Episode: "Pilot"); Peter Falk as Lt. Columbo in Columbo (ABC) (Episode: "It's All in the Game"); Michael Moriarty as Ben Stone in Law & Order (NBC) (Episode: "Sanctuary"); Tom Skerritt as Jimmy Brock in Picket Fences (CBS) (Episode: "Dairy Queen")	Outstanding Lead Actress in a Drama Series: Sela Ward as Teddy Reed in Sisters (NBC) (Episode: "Land of the Lost Children"); Kathy Baker as Jill Brock in Picket Fences (CBS) (Episode: "Guns 'R' Us"); Swoosie Kurtz as Alex Halsey in Sisters (NBC) (Episode: "Protective Measures"); Angela Lansbury as Jessica Fletcher in Murder, She Wrote (CBS) (Episode: "A Killing in Cork"); Jane Seymour as Dr. Michaela Quinn in Dr. Quinn, Medicine Woman (CBS) (Episode: "Best Friends")
Outstanding Lead Actor in a Miniseries or Special: Hume Cronyn as Robert Samuel Peek in To Dance with the White Dog (CBS); Michael Caine as Joseph Stalin in World War II: When Lions Roared (NBC); James Garner as Ira Moran in Breathing Lessons (CBS); Matthew Modine as Dr. Don Francis in And the Band Played On (HBO); Sam Waterston as Forrest Bedford in I'll Fly Away: Then and Now (PBS)	Outstanding Lead Actress in a Miniseries or Special: Kirstie Alley as Sally Goodson in David's Mother (CBS); Bette Midler as Mama Rose in Gypsy (CBS); Helen Mirren as DCI Jane Tennison in Prime Suspect III (PBS); Jessica Tandy as Cora Peek in To Dance with the White Dog (CBS); Joanne Woodward as Maggie Moran in Breathing Lessons (CBS)

==== Supporting performances ====
Outstanding Supporting Actor in a Comedy Series: Michael Richards as Cosmo Kramer in Seinfeld (NBC) (Episodes: "The Sniffing Accountant" + "The Opposite"); Jason Alexander as George Costanza in Seinfeld (NBC) (Episodes: "The Hamptons" + "The Opposite"); David Hyde Pierce as Dr. Niles Crane in Frasier (NBC) (Episodes: "A Mid-Winter Night's Dream" + "Author, Author"); Rip Torn as Arthur in The Larry Sanders Show (HBO) (Episodes: "The List" + "Larry's Birthday"); Jerry Van Dyke as Luther Van Dam in Coach (ABC) (Episodes: "Piece o' Cake" + "Coach for a Day", Part 2)	Outstanding Supporting Actress in a Comedy Series: Laurie Metcalf as Jackie Harris in Roseanne (ABC) (Episodes: "Labor Day" + "Past Imperfect"); Shelley Fabares as Christine Armstrong in Coach (ABC) (Episodes: "Nice Job If You Can Get It" + "The Stand-In"); Faith Ford as Corky Sherwood in Murphy Brown (CBS) (Episodes: "The Young and the Rest of Us" + "The More Things Stay The Same"); Sara Gilbert as Darlene Conner in Roseanne (ABC) (Episodes: "Two Down, One to Go" + "Everybody Comes to Jackie's"); Julia Louis-Dreyfus as Elaine Benes in Seinfeld (NBC) (Episodes: "The Mango" + "The Opposite"); Liz Torres as Mahalia Sanchez in The John Larroquette Show (NBC) (Episodes: "Pilot" + "God")
Outstanding Supporting Actor in a Drama Series: Fyvush Finkel as Douglas Wambaugh in Picket Fences (CBS) (Episodes: "Turpitude" + "Squatter's Rights"); Gordon Clapp as Greg Medavoy in NYPD Blue (ABC) (Episodes: "Ice Follies" + "Abandando Abandoned"); Barry Corbin as Maurice J. Minnifield in Northern Exposure (CBS) (Episodes: "The Mystery of the Old Curio Shop" + "The Gift of the Maggie"); Nicholas Turturro as James Martinez in NYPD Blue (ABC)(Episodes: "Up on the Roof" + "Guns 'N' Rosaries"); Ray Walston as Henry Bone in Picket Fences (CBS) (Episodes:"Blue Christmas" + "Abominable Snowman")	Outstanding Supporting Actress in a Drama Series: Leigh Taylor-Young as Rachel Harris in Picket Fences (CBS) (Episodes: "Remote Control" + "Divine Recall"); Amy Brenneman as Janice Licalsi in NYPD Blue (ABC) (Episodes: "4B or Not 4B" + "Guns 'N' Rosaries"); Jill Eikenberry as Ann Kelsey in L.A. Law (NBC) (Episodes: "Safe Sex" + "Age of Insolence"); Sharon Lawrence as Sylvia Costas in NYPD Blue (ABC) (Episodes: "Steroid Roy" + "Good Time Charlie"); Gail O'Grady as Donna Abandando in NYPD Blue (ABC) (Episodes: "Ice Follies" + "Abandando Abandoned")
Outstanding Supporting Actor in a Miniseries or Special: Michael A. Goorjian as David Goodson in David's Mother (CBS); Alan Alda as Dr. Robert Gallo in And the Band Played On (HBO); Matthew Broderick as John on A Life in the Theatre (TNT); Richard Gere as The Choreographer in And the Band Played On (HBO); Ian McKellen as Bill Kraus in And the Band Played On (HBO)	Outstanding Supporting Actress in a Miniseries or Special: Cicely Tyson as Castralia in Oldest Living Confederate Widow Tells All (CBS); Anne Bancroft as Lucy Marsden in Oldest Living Confederate Widow Tells All (CBS); Swoosie Kurtz as Mrs. Johnstone in And the Band Played On (HBO); Lee Purcell as Ann Thielman in Secret Sins of the Father (NBC); Lily Tomlin as Dr. Selma Dritz in And the Band Played On (HBO)

==== Individual performances ====
Outstanding Individual Performance in a Variety or Music Program
- Tracey Ullman – Tracey Ullman Takes on New York (HBO)
  - Whoopi Goldberg – The 66th Annual Academy Awards (ABC)
  - Phil Hartman – Saturday Night Live (NBC)
  - Mike Myers – Saturday Night Live (NBC)
  - Lily Tomlin – Growing Up Funny (Lifetime) as Madame Lupe

=== Directing ===
Outstanding Individual Achievement in Directing in a Comedy Series: Frasier (NBC): "The Good Son" – James Burrows; The John Larroquette Show (NBC): "Pilot" – John Whitesell; The Larry Sanders Show (HBO): "Life Behind Larry" – Todd Holland; Mad About You (NBC): "Love Letters" – Tom Moore; Mad About You (NBC): "Paul is Dead" – Lee Shallat-Chemel; Seinfeld (NBC): "The Mango" – Tom Cherones	Outstanding Individual Achievement in Directing in a Drama Series: NYPD Blue (ABC): "Tempest in a C-Cup" – Daniel Sackheim; Lois & Clark: The New Adventures of Superman (ABC): "Pilot" – Robert Butler; NYPD Blue (ABC): "Guns 'N' Rosaries" – Michael M. Robin; NYPD Blue (ABC): "Pilot" – Gregory Hoblit; NYPD Blue (ABC): "True Confessions" – Charles Haid
Outstanding Individual Achievement in Directing in a Variety or Music Program: The 47th Annual Tony Awards (CBS) – Walter C. Miller; The 66th Annual Academy Awards (ABC) – Jeff Margolis; Late Show with David Letterman (CBS) – Hal Gurnee; Saturday Night Live (NBC) – Dave Wilson; The Tonight Show with Jay Leno (NBC) – Ellen Brown; Tracey Ullman Takes on New York (HBO) – Don Scardino	Outstanding Individual Achievement in Directing for a Miniseries or Special: Against the Wall (HBO) – John Frankenheimer; And the Band Played On (HBO) – Roger Spottiswoode; Gypsy (CBS) – Emile Ardolino; My Breast (CBS) – Betty Thomas; To Dance with the White Dog (CBS) – Glenn Jordan

=== Writing ===
Outstanding Writing in a Comedy Series: Frasier (NBC): "The Good Son" – David Angell, Peter Casey and David Lee; Frasier (NBC): "The Show Where Lilith Comes Back" – Ken Levine and David Isaacs; The Larry Sanders Show (HBO): "Larry's Agent" – Story by : Victor Levin Teleplay by : Garry Shandling, Paul Simms, Maya Forbes and Drake Sather; Seinfeld (NBC): "The Mango" – Story by : Lawrence H. Levy Teleplay by : Lawrence H. Levy and Larry David; Seinfeld (NBC): "The Puffy Shirt" – Larry David	Outstanding Writing in a Drama Series: NYPD Blue (ABC): "Steroid Roy" – Ann Biderman; NYPD Blue (ABC): "NYPD Lou" – Ted Mann; NYPD Blue (ABC): "Personal Foul" – Story by : David Milch Teleplay by : Burton Armus; NYPD Blue (ABC): "Pilot" – Story by : Steven Bochco and David Milch Teleplay by : David Milch; NYPD Blue (ABC): "Tempest in a C-Cup" – Gardner Stern
Outstanding Writing in a Variety or Music Program: Dennis Miller Live (HBO); The Kids in the Hall (CBS); Late Show with David Letterman (CBS); Mystery Science Theater 3000 (Comedy Central); Tracey Ullman Takes on New York (HBO)	Outstanding Writing in a Miniseries or Special: David's Mother (CBS) – Bob Randall; And the Band Played On (HBO) – Arnold Schulman; Breathing Lessons (CBS) – Robert W. Lenski; Prime Suspect III (PBS) – Lynda La Plante; Tales of the City (PBS) – Richard Kramer

== Most major nominations ==
Networks with multiple major nominations (Note: "Major" constitutes the categories listed above: Program, Acting, Directing, and Writing. Does not include the technical categories.)
Network	No. of Nominations
CBS	42
NBC	39
ABC	36
HBO	24

Programs with multiple major nominations
Program	Category	Network	No. of Nominations
NYPD Blue	Drama	ABC	17
And the Band Played On	Movie	HBO	9
Seinfeld	Comedy	NBC	8
Frasier	Comedy	NBC	6
Picket Fences	Drama	CBS	6
Mad About You	Comedy	NBC	5
Breathing Lessons	Movie	CBS	4
The Larry Sanders Show	Comedy	HBO	4
Roseanne	Comedy	ABC	4
Saturday Night Live	Variety	NBC	4
To Dance with the White Dog	Movie	CBS	4
Tracey Ullman Takes on New York	Variety	HBO	4
The 66th Annual Academy Awards	Variety	ABC	3
David's Mother	Movie	CBS	3
Gypsy	Movie	CBS	3
The John Larroquette Show	Comedy	NBC	3
Late Show with David Letterman	Variety	CBS	3
Oldest Living Confederate Widow Tells All	Miniseries	CBS	3
Prime Suspect III	Miniseries	PBS	3
The 47th Annual Tony Awards	Variety	CBS	2
Coach	Comedy	ABC	2
Dennis Miller Live	Variety	HBO	2
Home Improvement	Comedy	ABC	2
Law & Order	Drama	NBC	2
Murphy Brown	Comedy	CBS	2
Northern Exposure	Drama	CBS	2
Sisters	Drama	NBC	2
Tales of the City	Miniseries	PBS	2
The Tonight Show with Jay Leno	Variety	NBC	2
World War II: When Lions Roared	Miniseries	NBC	2

== Most major awards ==
Networks with multiple major awards
Network	No. of Awards
CBS	12
NBC	6
ABC	4
HBO	4

Programs with multiple major awards
Program	Category	Network	No. of Awards
Frasier	Comedy	NBC	4
David's Mother	Movie	CBS	3
NYPD Blue	Drama	ABC	3
Picket Fences	Drama	CBS	3
