= And the Band Played On (film) =

1993 American television film by Roger Spottiswoode

- Promotional poster
- Genre: Drama
- Based on: And the Band Played On: Politics, People, and the AIDS Epidemic by Randy Shilts
- Screenplay by: Arnold Schulman
- Directed by: Roger Spottiswoode
- Starring: Matthew Modine; Alan Alda; Phil Collins; Richard Gere; Anjelica Huston; Steve Martin; Ian McKellen; Lily Tomlin; Glenne Headly; Swoosie Kurtz; Richard Masur; Saul Rubinek; Charles Martin Smith; Christian Clemenson; Jeffrey Nordling; Richard Jenkins; BD Wong
- Music by: Carter Burwell
- Country of origin: United States
- Original language: English

Production
- Executive producers: Aaron Spelling; E. Duke Vincent
- Producers: Sarah Pillsbury; Midge Sanford
- Cinematography: Paul Elliott
- Editor: Lois Freeman-Fox
- Running time: 141 minutes
- Production companies: Spelling Entertainment; HBO Pictures
- Budget: $8 million

Original release
- Network: HBO
- Release: September 11, 1993

And the Band Played On is a 1993 American television film docudrama directed by Roger Spottiswoode from a teleplay by Arnold Schulman, adapted from Randy Shilts's 1987 non-fiction book of the same name. Chronicling the early years of the HIV/AIDS epidemic in the United States, the film follows CDC epidemiologist Don Francis as he investigates the emerging disease amid bureaucratic indifference, scientific rivalry, and resistance from the blood industry, alongside San Francisco activist Bill Kraus's efforts to protect the gay community. The film features a large ensemble cast including Matthew Modine, Alan Alda, Ian McKellen, Richard Gere, Anjelica Huston, Steve Martin, Lily Tomlin, Phil Collins, Glenne Headly, Swoosie Kurtz, Richard Masur, Saul Rubinek, Charles Martin Smith, Christian Clemenson, Jeffrey Nordling, Richard Jenkins, and BD Wong.

Produced by Spelling Entertainment for HBO Pictures, the film premiered at the Montreal World Film Festival on September 2, 1993, ahead of its television broadcast on HBO on September 11, 1993. It was later released theatrically in several countries and aired on NBC in 1994 with a parental discretion warning. The project had a lengthy and troubled development history, with Schulman rewriting the script over several years through multiple changes of director.

The film received generally positive reviews, with critics praising its ambition and emotional weight while noting that condensing Shilts's lengthy book led to uneven pacing. It holds a 100% approval rating on Rotten Tomatoes based on early reviews. At the 46th Primetime Emmy Awards, the film won three prizes (from fourteen nominations altogether), including the Outstanding Made for Television Movie, among numerous other award wins and nominations. Additionally, the film would go on to receive two Golden Globe Award nominations: Best Miniseries or Television Film and Best Actor – Miniseries or Television Film (Matthew Modine).

== Plot ==
In a prologue set in 1976, American epidemiologist Don Francis arrives in a village on the banks of the Ebola River in Zaire as part of an international team investigating a mysterious illness that has killed many of the residents and the doctor treating them, later identified as Ebola hemorrhagic fever. It is his first exposure to such an epidemic, and the images of the dead he helps cremate haunt him when he becomes involved with HIV/AIDS research at the Centers for Disease Control and Prevention.

In 1981, Francis becomes aware of a growing number of deaths among gay men in Los Angeles, New York City, and San Francisco caused by a rare lung condition, pneumocystis pneumonia, which typically affects those with weakened immune systems. He moves to Atlanta, where Dr. James Curran of the CDC asks him to lead an in-depth investigation into this new immune disorder. Because of the Reagan administration's clampdown on public spending, Francis works with little money, limited space, and outdated equipment while clashing with members of the medical community whose personal agendas cause resentment.

Francis and his colleagues find strong evidence the disease is spread through sex. Some gay men, such as San Francisco activist Bill Kraus, support his investigation, while others express anger at unwanted interference in their lives, particularly Francis's attempts to close the local gay bathhouses. Kraus' work to protect the gay community from the virus strains his relationship with his boyfriend, Kico Govantes.

Francis and other CDC staff find the blood industry unwilling to act against the epidemic for fear of financial losses. Francis pursues his theory that AIDS is caused by a sexually transmitted virus, but his efforts are complicated by rivalry between French scientists from the Pasteur Institute and American scientists, particularly Robert Gallo of the National Institutes of Health, who is angered by Francis' collaboration with the French. The researchers squabble over credit for discovering the virus and developing a blood test, while the death toll climbs.

In 1984, Kraus notices a spot on his ankle and worries that it might be Kaposi's sarcoma, an AIDS-defining illness. His fears are confirmed when his doctor diagnoses him with AIDS, and Govantes returns to him after learning he is sick. After the discovery of the AIDS virus is publicly announced, Francis submits a plan for prevention and an eventual cure. Curran warns him it will never be approved and the CDC rejects the proposal as too costly. Francis is transferred to San Francisco. Curran tells Francis that the Reagan administration wants to appear focused on the AIDS epidemic, but the CDC has in fact been ordered to "look busy and do nothing."

In November 1985, Kraus and Govantes are walking in a San Francisco candlelight vigil march when Kraus suddenly starts coughing and becomes too weak to stand. He is taken to a local hospital with vision trouble, unable to speak coherently. Francis arrives, and the symptoms pass. Francis laments that they could have stopped the virus from spreading, but fears it may now be too late. Kraus tells him that he used to be afraid of dying, but is now afraid for those who live. He dies in January 1986.

Francis remains at the CDC until 1992, when he leaves to work on developing an AIDS vaccine. The film closes with Elton John's "The Last Song" playing over a photo and video montage of prominent figures affected by HIV/AIDS.

== Principal cast ==
- Matthew Modine as Dr. Don Francis, an epidemiologist, HIV/AIDS researcher, and one of the first scientists to suggest that AIDS was caused by an infectious agent
- Alan Alda as Dr. Robert Gallo, a biomedical researcher and one of the discoverers of HIV as the infectious agent responsible for AIDS
- Ian McKellen as Bill Kraus, a gay rights and AIDS activist and congressional aide
- Glenne Headly as Dr. Mary Guinan, an investigator of the HIV/AIDS epidemic for the CDC
- Richard Masur as Dr. William Darrow, a sociologist and investigator for the CDC, one of the discoverers of HIV as the virus that causes AIDS
- Saul Rubinek as Dr. James Curran, an investigator of the HIV/AIDS epidemic and administrator for the CDC
- Lily Tomlin as Dr. Selma Dritz, a physician and epidemiologist
- Jeffrey Nordling as Gaëtan Dugas, a Canadian flight attendant and early AIDS patient who was Patient o (the letter), meaning out of California. This was commonly misread as patient 0 (the numeral zero) in Bill Darrow's transmissibility study
- Charles Martin Smith as Dr. Harold Jaffe, an investigator of the HIV/AIDS epidemic for the CDC
- Donal Logue as Bobbi Campbell, an AIDS activist
- BD Wong as Kico Govantes, a San Francisco artist and Bill Kraus' lover
- Patrick Bauchau as Dr. Luc Montagnier, a French virologist and one of the discoverers of HIV
- Nathalie Baye as Dr. Françoise Barre
- Phil Collins as Eddie Papasano, a San Francisco bathhouse owner
- Richard Gere as The Choreographer, a preeminent San Francisco theatrical dancer and director who learns he has AIDS
- Steve Martin as The Brother, a reticent sibling of a recently deceased gay man who was an AIDS patient
- David Marshall Grant as Dennis Seeley
- Ronald Guttman as Dr. Jean-Claude Chermann, a French virologist and manager of the research team that discovered HIV
- Anjelica Huston as Dr. Betsy Reisz
- Richard Jenkins as Dr. Marcus Conant, a dermatologist and one of the first physicians to diagnose and treat AIDS
- Ken Jenkins as Dr. Dennis Donohue, an HIV researcher
- Tchéky Karyo as Dr. Willy Rozenbaum, a French physician and one of the discoverers of HIV
- Dakin Matthews as Congressman Phillip Burton, a member of the U.S. House of Representatives from San Francisco campaigning for gay rights
- Peter McRobbie as Dr. Max Essex, one of the first to suspect that a retrovirus was the cause of AIDS and to determine that HIV could be transmitted through blood
- Christian Clemenson as Dr. Dale Lawrence, a member of the CDC's Task Force on Kaposi's Sarcoma and Opportunistic Infections
- Neal Benari as Dr. Tom Spira, a research scientist at the CDC (credited as Neal Ben-Ari)
- David Dukes as Dr. Mervyn Silverman, San Francisco Director of Health
- Richard Fancy as Dr. Michael Gottlieb
- David Clennon as Mr. Johnstone
- Swoosie Kurtz as Mrs. Johnstone, a woman who contracted AIDS through tainted blood during surgery
- Lawrence Monoson as Chip
- Bud Cort as Antique Shop Owner
- Stephen Spinella as Brandy Alexander
- David Marshall Grant as Dennis Seeley
- Yasmine Golchan as Dr. Françoise Brun-Vezinet
- Patrick Gorman as Charles Dauget
- Jeff Hayenga as Dr. Bruce Voeller
- William Wintersole as Dr. Paul Florino
- Geoff Lower as Dr. David Simpson
- Lenny Wolpe as Dr. Joseph R. Bove, Director of the Yale-New Haven Hospital Blood Bank
- Rosemary Murphy as Blood Bank Executive
- Clyde Kusatsu as Blood Bank Executive
- Thomas Kopache as Blood Bank Executive
- Walter Addison as Blood Bank Executive
- René Le Vant as Blood Bank Executive
- Laura Innes as Hemophiliac Representative
- Robert Martin Robinson as Chief Hospital Administrator (France)
- Jill Andre as Red Cross Spokesperson
- Daniel Henning as Blaine, a care "buddy" to an AIDS patient, Greg, played by Jon Matthews
- Laura James as U.S. Secretary of Health and Human Services Margaret Heckler
- Angela Paton as Woman in Denver
- Alan Barry as Hemophiliac Patient in Denver
- John Durbin as 6th Man
- Erasor Kemie as Sudanese Student
- Ike Ikediashi as Sudanese Boy
- Niki Gilbert as Sudanese Girl

== Closing montage ==
The film closes with footage of a candlelight vigil and march in San Francisco, followed by a montage of images of numerous celebrities who have died of AIDS or were involved with HIV/AIDS education and research, accompanied by Elton John singing his "The Last Song". The montage includes:

- Bobbi Campbell
- Ryan White
- Rock Hudson
- Anthony Perkins
- Tina Chow
- Rudolf Nureyev
- Arthur Ashe
- Michael Bennett
- Liberace
- Freddie Mercury
- Diana, Princess of Wales
- Elizabeth Taylor
- Elizabeth Glaser
- Magic Johnson
- Larry Kramer
- Alison Gertz
- Max Robinson
- Halston
- Willi Smith
- Perry Ellis
- Peter Allen
- Steve Rubell
- Keith Haring
- Stewart McKinney
- Denholm Elliott
- Brad Davis
- Amanda Blake
- Robert Reed
- Michel Foucault
- Tom Waddell

As of April 2026, Magic Johnson is the only person featured in the montage alive.

== Production ==
Arnold Schulman, who wrote the script, recalled "What I thought would take two months of time has taken almost two years of my life, so far. One director came and went... then another director. I worked with the new director day and night, rewriting. Then another director came along and another director. One director wouldn't even talk to me. The irony is, this is one thing I have done for altruistic reasons, as an indictment against greed, ego, and bureaucracy, and I have gone through a nightmare of greed, ego, and bureaucracy while doing the picture."

== Critical reception ==
Most reviewers agreed that the filmmakers had a daunting task in adapting Shilts's massive, fact-filled text into a dramatically coherent film. Many critics praised the results. Film review website Rotten Tomatoes gives the film a 100% "fresh" rating based on eight reviews.

Tony Scott of Variety stated that "if there are lapses, director Spottiswoode's engrossing, powerful work still accomplishes its mission: Shilts's book, with all its shock, sorrow and anger, has been transferred decisively to the screen."

John O'Connor of The New York Times agreed that the adaptation "adds up to tough and uncommonly courageous television. Excessive tinkering has left the pacing of the film sluggish in spots, but the story is never less than compelling."

Ken Tucker of Entertainment Weekly graded the film B+ and called it an "intriguing, sometimes awkward, always earnest combination of docudrama, medical melodrama, and mystery story. The stars lend warmth to a movie necessarily preoccupied with cold research and politics, and they lend prestige: The movie must be important, since actors of this stature agreed to appear. The result of the stars' generosity, however, works against the movie by halting the flow of the drama every time a familiar face pops up on screen. The emotions and agony involved in this subject give Band an irresistible power, yet the movie's rhythm is choppy and the dialogue frequently stiff and clichéd. The best compliment one can pay this TV movie is to say that unlike so many fact-based films, it does not exploit or diminish the tragedy of its subject."

Time Out New York wrote, "So keen were the makers of this adaptation of Randy Shilts's best-seller to bombard us with the facts and figures of the history of AIDS that they forgot to offer a properly dramatic human framework to make us care fully about the characters." The review also says that the multiple issues the film attempts to cover "make for a disjointed, clichéd narrative."

Richard Zoglin of Time magazine wrote: "Shilts's prodigiously researched 600-page book has been boiled down to a fact-filled, dramatically coherent, occasionally moving 2 hours and 20 minutes. At a time when most made-for-TV movies have gone tabloid crazy, here is a rare one that tackles a big subject, raises the right issues, fights the good fight."

== Accolades ==
| Year | Award | Category | Nominee(s) | Result | Ref. |
|---|---|---|---|---|---|
| 1993 | Montreal World Film Festival | Special Grand Prize of the Jury | Roger Spottiswoode | Won | |
| 1994 | American Cinema Editors Awards | Best Edited Motion Picture for Non-Commercial Television | Lois Freeman-Fox | Won | |
| 1994 | Artios Awards | Best Casting for TV Movie of the Week | Judith Holstra and Nikki Valko | Won | |
| 1994 | Directors Guild of America Awards | Outstanding Directorial Achievement in Dramatic Specials | Roger Spottiswoode | Nominated | |
| 1994 | GLAAD Media Awards | Outstanding TV Movie | | Won | |
| 1994 | Golden Globe Awards | Best Miniseries or Television Film | | Nominated | |
| 1994 | Golden Globe Awards | Best Actor – Miniseries or Television Film | Matthew Modine | Nominated | |
| 1994 | Primetime Emmy Awards | Outstanding Made for Television Movie | Sarah Pillsbury, Midge Sanford, Aaron Spelling, and E. Duke Vincent | Won | |
| 1994 | Primetime Emmy Awards | Outstanding Lead Actor in a Miniseries or Special | Matthew Modine | Nominated | |
| 1994 | Primetime Emmy Awards | Outstanding Supporting Actor in a Miniseries or Special | Alan Alda | Nominated | |
| 1994 | Primetime Emmy Awards | Outstanding Supporting Actor in a Miniseries or Special | Richard Gere | Nominated | |
| 1994 | Primetime Emmy Awards | Outstanding Supporting Actor in a Miniseries or Special | Ian McKellen | Nominated | |
| 1994 | Primetime Emmy Awards | Outstanding Supporting Actress in a Miniseries or Special | Swoosie Kurtz | Nominated | |
| 1994 | Primetime Emmy Awards | Outstanding Supporting Actress in a Miniseries or Special | Lily Tomlin | Nominated | |
| 1994 | Primetime Emmy Awards | Outstanding Individual Achievement in Directing for a Miniseries or a Special | Roger Spottiswoode | Nominated | |
| 1994 | Primetime Emmy Awards | Outstanding Individual Achievement in Writing in a Miniseries or a Special | Arnold Schulman | Nominated | |
| 1994 | Primetime Emmy Awards | Outstanding Individual Achievement in Art Direction for a Miniseries or a Special | Lee Mayman, Victoria Paul, and Diana Allen Williams | Nominated | |
| 1994 | Primetime Emmy Awards | Outstanding Individual Achievement in Casting | Judith Holstra and Nikki Valko | Won | |
| 1994 | Primetime Emmy Awards | Outstanding Individual Achievement in Editing for a Miniseries or a Special – Single Camera Production | Lois Freeman-Fox | Won | |
| 1994 | Primetime Emmy Awards | Outstanding Individual Achievement in Hairstyling for a Miniseries or a Special | Martin Christopher and Arturo Rojas | Nominated | |
| 1994 | Primetime Emmy Awards | Outstanding Individual Achievement in Makeup for a Miniseries or a Special | Allan A. Apone and Michael Spatola | Nominated | |
| 1995 | American Society of Cinematographers Awards | Outstanding Achievement in Cinematography in Movie of the Week or Pilot | Paul Elliott | Nominated | |
| 1995 | CableACE Awards | Movie or Miniseries | | Nominated | |
| 1995 | CableACE Awards | Supporting Actor in a Movie or Miniseries | Richard Gere | Nominated | |
| 1995 | CableACE Awards | Supporting Actor in a Movie or Miniseries | Ian McKellen | Won | |
| 1995 | CableACE Awards | Supporting Actor in a Movie or Miniseries | Lawrence Monoson | Nominated | |
| 1995 | CableACE Awards | Supporting Actress in a Movie or Miniseries | Swoosie Kurtz | Nominated | |
| 1995 | CableACE Awards | Supporting Actress in a Movie or Miniseries | Lily Tomlin | Nominated | |
| 1995 | CableACE Awards | Directing a Movie or Miniseries | Roger Spottiswoode | Nominated | |
| 1995 | CableACE Awards | Writing a Movie or Miniseries | Arnold Schulman | Won | |
| 1995 | CableACE Awards | Editing a Dramatic Special or Series/Theatrical Special/Movie or Miniseries | Lois Freeman-Fox | Nominated | |
| 1995 | CableACE Awards | Make-Up | Allan A. Apone and Michael Spatola | Nominated | |
| 1995 | Humanitas Prize | PBS/Cable Television | Arnold Schulman | Won | |
| 2007 | Online Film & Television Association Awards | Hall of Fame – Television Programs | | Inducted | |

== See also ==
- 1993 in television
- The Normal Heart (2014) – An HBO film also regarding the early years of the HIV/AIDS crisis in the United States
