= HPA-23 =

Antiretroviral medication

Clinical data
- Trade names: HPA-23
- Routes of administration: intravenous

Identifiers
- IUPAC name: Ammonium antimony sodium tungsten oxide
- CAS Number: 89899-81-0
- UNII: J08H62IZC9

Chemical and physical data
- 3D model (JSmol): Interactive image
- SMILES: [O-2].[O-2].[O-2].[O-2].[O-2].[O-2].[O-2].[O-2].[O-2].[O-2].[O-2].[O-2].[O-2].[O-2].[O-2].[O-2].[O-2].[O-2].[O-2].[O-2].[O-2].[O-2].[O-2].[O-2].[O-2].[O-2].[O-2].[O-2].[O-2].[O-2].[O-2].[O-2].[O-2].[O-2].[O-2].[O-2].[O-2].[O-2].[O-2].[O-2].[O-2].[O-2].[O-2].[O-2].[O-2].[O-2].[O-2].[O-2].[O-2].[O-2].[O-2].[O-2].[O-2].[O-2].[O-2].[O-2].[O-2].[O-2].[O-2].[O-2].[O-2].[O-2].[O-2].[O-2].[O-2].[O-2].[O-2].[O-2].[O-2].[O-2].[O-2].[O-2].[O-2].[O-2].[O-2].[O-2].[O-2].[O-2].[O-2].[O-2].[O-2].[O-2].[O-2].[O-2].[O-2].[O-2].[Na+].[Na+].[Sb+3].[Sb+3].[Sb+3].[Sb+3].[Sb+3].[Sb+3].[Sb+3].[Sb+3].[Sb+3].[W+6].[W+6].[W+6].[W+6].[W+6].[W+6].[W+6].[W+6].[W+6].[W+6].[W+6].[W+6].[W+6].[W+6].[W+6].[W+6].[W+6].[W+6].[W+6].[W+6].[W+6].[NH4+].[NH4+].[NH4+].[NH4+].[NH4+].[NH4+].[NH4+].[NH4+].[NH4+].[NH4+].[NH4+].[NH4+].[NH4+].[NH4+].[NH4+].[NH4+].[NH4+]
- InChI: InChI=InChI=1S/17H3N.2Na.86O.9Sb.21W.54H/h17*1H3;;;;;;;;;;;;;;;;;;;;;;;;;;;;;;;;;;;;;;;;;;;;;;;;;;;;;;;;;;;;;;;;;;;;;;;;;;;;;;;;;;;;;;;;;;;;;;;;;;;;;;;;;;;;;;;;;;;;;;;;;;;;;;;;;;;;;;;;;;;;;;;;;;;;;;;;;;;;;;;;;;;;;;;;;;;;/q;;;;;;;;;;;;;;;;;2*+1;86*-2;9*+3;21*+6;;;;;;;;;;;;;;;;;;;;;;;;;;;;;;;;;;;;;;;;;;;;;;;;;;;;;;/p+17; Key:RZPIWQYBNXZVOI-UHFFFAOYSA-A

HPA-23 (systematic name: ammonium antimony sodium tungsten oxide), sometimes referred to as antimonium tungstate, is a chemical compound that was investigated in the 1980s as a potential antiretroviral drug for the treatment of HIV infection. Early reports in 1984 generated publicity suggesting possible effectiveness against HIV and AIDS, only a year after the virus was first identified. Subsequent studies, however, failed to demonstrate clinical efficacy, and serious adverse effects—including liver toxicity and failure—were observed in some patients.

== History ==
HPA-23 was developed by Rhône-Poulenc at the Pasteur Institute in the 1970s and used in France on an experimental basis to treat HIV and AIDS patients beginning in 1984. The inventors of the drug, as listed in its patent, were Jean-Claude Chermann, Dominique Dormont, Etienne Vilmer, Bruno Spire, Françoise Barré-Sinoussi, Luc Montagnier, and Willy Rozenbaum. While the drug was not presented as a cure for HIV/AIDS, it was suggested it could arrest replication and spread of the virus.

The United States, which had a more stringent drug approval process than France, delayed authorizing use of HPA-23 even for clinical trials, prompting an angry outcry and an exodus of more than 100 American AIDS patients to France to seek treatment, encouraged in part by a French call for American volunteers. Bill Kraus, who received HPA-23 dosages in France as a medical tourist, "pinned his entire hope for survival" on the drug, even to the exclusion of other experimental medications then in development. After actor Rock Hudson received treatment at a Paris hospital with HPA-23, a representative of the National Gay Task Force declared that "something is wrong with the health-care system when a wealthy man and a friend of the President has to go to Europe for treatment". At the same time, however, some within the American scientific community cautioned AIDS sufferers against putting too much hope in HPA-23 and generally supported the Food and Drug Administration's (FDA) conservative approach to certification. William A. Haseltine commented that reports of the drug's success in France were based on "the crummiest kind of anecdotal stories – they don't do the scientifically controlled trials". Physicians at San Francisco General Hospital's AIDS Clinic echoed Haseltine's concerns, noting that French testing of the drug was done without any type of control group and that the drug's high toxicity made it potentially dangerous to patients already suffering serious infections. Public Citizen, which was often critical of FDA decisions, also came out in support of the agency's timeline for certification.

In August 1985, under increasing public pressure to fast track approval of the drug, the United States Food and Drug Administration permitted the use of HPA-23 in extremely limited human testing. In the ensuing clinical trials no improvement in the condition of the test subjects was observed, with some even showing increased levels of HIV replication and three patients suffering liver failure triggered by the drug. By 1986, the National Academy of Sciences had concluded that no therapeutic benefits for persons infected with HIV could be attributed to HPA-23. It was subsequently abandoned as a treatment option.

== See also ==
- Ammonium paratungstate
