= Mary Guinan =

American doctor (born 1939)

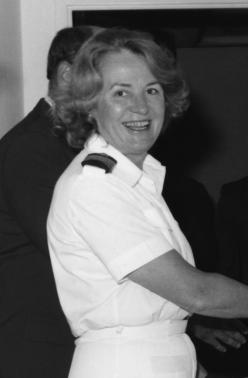
- Guinan in 1991
- Born: 1939 (age 86–87); New York City, U.S.
- Education: Hunter College (BA); University of Texas Medical Branch (PhD); Johns Hopkins University Medical School (MD)
- Known for: AIDS investigation; Subject in the book And the Band Played On
- Scientific career
- Fields: Public health; virology; epidemiology
- Workplaces: University of Nevada, Las Vegas; Dean of School of Community Health Science

Mary Elizabeth Guinan (born 1939) is an American doctor specializing in public health, virology, and epidemiology. She was the dean at the School of Community Health Sciences at the University of Nevada, Las Vegas. Guinan is known for her work in the initial investigation of the HIV/AIDS epidemic for the Centers for Disease Control and Prevention (CDC). Randy Shilts's 1987 book And the Band Played On and its 1993 film adaptation documented her efforts regarding these issues. In the film, she was played by Glenne Headly. Later on, she became the first female State Health Officer appointed to the Nevada government. Guinan also became president of the American Medical Women's Association (AMWA), after 40 years of membership.

== Early life and education ==
Guinan was born in Brooklyn, New York, in 1939, to parents who had emigrated from Ireland. She began her educational career at the Hunter College in New York City, obtaining a Bachelor of Arts. After her undergraduate time at Hunter ended, she received a PhD in biochemistry and physiology at the University of Texas Medical Branch located in Galveston, Texas. She finished her formal education by receiving an MD from the Johns Hopkins University School of Medicine in Baltimore.

After completing her residency in internal medicine at Hershey Medical Center (at Pennsylvania State University), she pursued an infectious disease fellowship at University of Utah School of Medicine in Salt Lake City. Later in her career, she was elected to the Fellow of the Infectious Diseases Society of America for her excellence in research regarding the topic.

== Early career ==
Guinan began her career working in a Chiclets gum factory developing flavors after graduating with a chemistry degree from Hunter College. She took this job reluctantly after realizing the shortage of openings for women in chemistry-related careers. Shortly after joining the company, she encountered her first glass ceiling: male colleagues were making far higher salaries than their female counterparts. Guinan attempted to apply to graduate school for chemistry upon facing discrimination at work, but the schools did not accept women or did not aid in the financial burden the tuition imposed.

Guinan instead began a new career path after being accepted to the University of Texas Medical Branch in Galveston for a doctorate of physiology. During this time, she considered pursuing a career in space-related endeavors as the US space program blossomed, but again faced obstacles. She learned women were not even allowed into the command room near the men in the space program out of fear of distraction. It was then she turned her sights on medicine.

== Smallpox eradication program member ==
After completing her medical residency, Guinan joined a two-year training program with the Epidemic Intelligence Service of the Communicable Disease Center (CDC), and asked to work with the World Health Organization (WHO) on smallpox eradication. She was originally rejected as she learned the WHO did not accept women, but later discovered the government of India was behind this decision. She threatened to write a letter to the prime minister, Indira Gandhi, who was a woman herself, directly addressing the alleged ban. It was just a week later when she was accepted to the program.

Guinan spent five months with a team in Uttar Pradesh, India, where she worked to identify locals suffering from smallpox and subsequently ring vaccinate those susceptible to the disease in the immediate area (generally a 10-mile radius from the infected individual). She worked out of a small mud hut and traveled by Jeep with a translator to accompany her on her endeavors. A reward of 10 rupees was provided to any local citizen able to look at a picture of smallpox and identify someone they knew who was suffering. This process assisted in administering vaccinations to those who were infected primarily, and then to their close circle; this is ring vaccination.

Soon after Guinan returned to the U.S. to complete her program, Uttar Pradesh reached a zero infection rate. She continued these efforts in Pakistan in the 1980s, working with refugees.

== Sexually transmitted infectious disease fellowship ==
After her EIS training, Guinan was accepted to an infectious disease fellowship at the University of Utah. There, she studied the herpes virus, focusing on oral herpes. Soon she found herself "an expert" on genital herpes after answering questions and lecturing about oral herpes. After many days of news interviews and calls from all over the world asking for help with genital herpes, Guinan decided to become the genital herpes expert everyone thought she was; she focused on women, who were not studied as thoroughly as men, at that time. She became known as "The Herpes Expert".

Reflecting on her career in medicine, Guinan stated, "I grew up with parents who were immigrants from Ireland, and they always told me that I was in the greatest country in the world and that I should be giving back what I was given."

== HIV/AIDS and Ebola efforts ==
In 1978, Guinan was asked to work with the Venereal Disease Control Division (renamed STD Division) of the CDC. By 1981, when the CDC began investigating HIV/AIDS she was the only virologist in the STD unit. She was made a member of the AIDS task force, which was credited with "discovering" the AIDS epidemic. While investigating the epidemic, a newspaper columnist, Randy Shilts, often interviewed Guinan. In 1987, the book And the Band Played On was published, and included interviews with Guinan.

In 1990, after becoming the first woman to be the Associated Director for Science at the CDC, Guinan was made the assistant director for Evaluation, Office of HIV/AIDS at the CDC, a position she would hold until 1995. In 1995–98, still with the CDC, she was the named the Chief of the Urban Research centers (New York, Seattle, Detroit), a community-based prevention and health promotion effort.

She continued her interest in disease by participating in efforts regarding Ebola. Speaking on the frontline workers, she proclaimed, "One can only be in awe of the many dedicated workers who have volunteered to serve in such a dangerous environment. Not the least of these are the medical detectives who collect clues, analyze data, investigate suspected cases, and carry out their public health mission".

== Nevada Chief State Health Officer ==
In 1998, Guinan became the Nevada State Chief Health Officer, the first woman to hold that position. When asked why she chose Nevada, she said that while states like New York and California had a solid base of public health practices, Nevada was just beginning to develop its plans; as such, it was a great opportunity to make a large impact on the health of Nevada's citizens.

During her tenure she oversaw investigations regarding the Fallon cancer cluster, the Southern Nevada hepatitis C outbreak of 2008 linked to the re-use of equipment at the Endoscopy Center of Nevada (acting), and the state's reaction to the 2009 H1N1 influenza A virus pandemic (acting).

== Honors and awards ==
- 2014 Elizabeth Blackwell Award from the American Medical Women's Association
- 2001 Distinguished Alumnus Award from the University of Texas Medical Branch Graduate School of Biomedical Sciences.

== Publications ==
In 2016, Guinan published an autobiography entitled Adventures of a Female Medical Detective: In Pursuit of Smallpox and AIDS, which was co-written by Anne D. Mather. The book details 12 stories of her life working to combat both smallpox and AIDS.
