= James W. Curran =

Professor of epidemiology and pioneering HIV/AIDS researcher

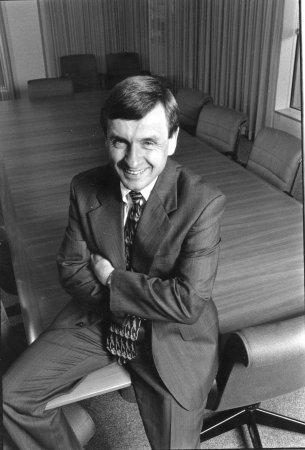
- Education: University of Notre Dame (B.S.); University of Michigan (M.D.); Harvard University (M.P.H.)
- Employers: Centers for Disease Control and Prevention; Rollins School of Public Health
- Known for: Public health; HIV/AIDS; Epidemiology

James W. Curran is professor of epidemiology and dean of the Rollins School of Public Health at Emory University. He is an adjunct Professor of Medicine and Nursing, and Co-Director and Principal Investigator of the Emory Center for AIDS Research. He is immediate past chair of the board on Population Health and Public Health Practice of the Institute of Medicine and served on the Executive Committee of the Association of Schools of Public Health. Additionally, he holds an endowed chair known as the James W. Curran Dean of Public Health. Curran is considered to be a pioneer, leader, and expert in the field of HIV/AIDS.

== Early life and education ==
James Curran was born in Michigan and grew up in a suburb of Detroit. He attended the University of Detroit Jesuit High School and Academy, which fostered his interests in science and the humanities. He majored in chemistry and completed premedical courses at the University of Notre Dame, graduating in 1966.

Curran then went on to receive his M.D. from the University of Michigan Medical School in 1970. Initially drawn to clinical practice, he began a residency program in obstetrics and gynecology and focused on family planning. However, his interests shifted towards public health during the Vietnam War. Faced with the prospect of military service, he opted to fulfill his service obligation through the U.S. Public Health Service.

== Time at Centers for Disease Control and Prevention (CDC) ==
From 1981 Curran led the task force on HIV/AIDS at the Centers for Disease Control and Prevention (CDC) and subsequently led the HIV/AIDS Division. While at the CDC, he attained the rank of the assistant surgeon general. He is featured in And the Band Played On, a non-fiction book by San Francisco Chronicle journalist Randy Shilts, which chronicles the discovery and spread of HIV/AIDS. Curran was a pioneer in the field in that he was one of the first scientists to recognize the infectious nature of HIV/AIDS, and he is recognized for fighting the stigmatization of people who are infected with HIV/AIDS. In the film version of And the Band Played On he was portrayed by Saul Rubinek.

Curran was interviewed by Barry Petersen in an early CBS News report on "gay cancer" on June 12, 1982, with Bobbi Campbell, Larry Kramer and Marcus Conant.

== Achievements ==
Curran is a fellow member of the American Epidemiologic Society, the American College of Preventive Medicine, and the Infectious Diseases Society of America. He is author or co-author of more than 260 scholarly publications, including reports from two recent IOM committees that he chaired or co-chaired on the global AIDS scale up and has served as Chair of the national Center for AIDS Research (CFAR), the Office of AIDS Research (OAR) Council, and the National Academy of Sciences Institute of Medicine's Board of Population Health and Public Health Practice. He was elected to the Institute of Medicine of the National Academy of Sciences in 1993, and he was given the Surgeon General's Medal of Excellence in 1996 and the John Snow Award from the American Public Health Association in 2003.
