= Selma Dritz =

American physician and epidemiologist

Selma Kaderman Dritz
- Selma K. Dritz, 1988
- Born: Selma Kaderman; June 29, 1917; Chicago, Illinois, U.S.
- Died: September 3, 2008 (aged 91); Oakland, California, U.S.
- Education: University of Illinois College of Medicine (MD); University of California, Berkeley School of Public Health (MPH)
- Partner: Harvey Fred Dritz
- Children: 3

Selma Kaderman Dritz (June 29, 1917 – September 3, 2008) was an American physician and epidemiologist who worked in San Francisco, California, where she began tracking the first known cases of Acquired Immune Deficiency Syndrome (AIDS) in the early 1980s.

== Early life and education ==
Selma Dritz was born in Chicago, Illinois, on June 29, 1917. Dritz loved music and began her career as a concert pianist before deciding that she ultimately wanted to help others through her role in the medical field.

Dritz studied medicine at the University of Illinois College of Medicine and earned a Doctor of Medicine (MD) in 1941. Following medical school, she completed an internship and a pediatrics residency at Cook County Hospital. After completing her residency, she worked as a pediatrician in private practice for several years. Subsequently, she served as a pediatric consultant with the Illinois State Health Department until 1947. In 1947, she took a temporary hiatus from medicine to raise her children. Dritz returned to academics in 1967, obtaining a master of public health degree (MPH) from the University of California, Berkeley School of Public Health, which complemented her medical background.

== Career ==
In 1968, she was hired by the City of San Francisco as assistant director of the Health Department's Bureau of Communicable Disease Control. She worked and followed general public health concerns of the community, such as food poisoning, influenza, and sexually transmitted infections (STIs). In 1981, along with Erwin Braff, the bureau's director, Dritz observed a rare form of pneumonia and a rare form of cancer, known previously to affect elderly Mediterranean men, called Kaposi's sarcoma, both of which were afflicting gay men. She relayed the information to the Centers for Disease Control and Prevention in Atlanta. This data, along with that of others, served to document the first AIDS epidemic. HIV/AIDS weakens the immune system of the affected person, making them more susceptible to viruses and other illnesses such as pneumonia and cancer. She began to establish the etiology and epidemiology of what would be termed Acquired Immune Deficiency Syndrome, more commonly known by its acronym, AIDS.

Her approach to epidemiology was instrumental in tracking and advancing the treatment of the newly-discovered human immunodeficiency virus (HIV). In short, Selma Dritz saved countless lives, and her work still continues today due to the research she conducted, and the information she provided.

Dritz wrote an article for the New England Journal of Medicine called "Medical Aspects of Homosexuality" in 1980. In this journal article, it explains some of the main medical and societal situations that have allowed the disease to spread so quickly, one of these being the public bathhouses that were shut down due to the rapid spread of the disease.

Paul Volberding, former president of the International AIDS Society who helped found the first AIDS clinic at San Francisco General Hospital in the 1980s, said of Dritz:

She was an absolutely wonderful person, and played an incredibly important role during those early days of the epidemic... Dr. Dritz was the most important person to whom the Centers for Disease Control came for the details of the AIDS situation here, and the information she gathered was invaluable for the CDC epidemiologists in understanding how the epidemic was spreading.

AIDS had a significant impact on Dritz's career. After pioneering the discovery of the disease, many sought her advice and answers. In her San Francisco community, she was known as someone who looked at an epidemic and didn't back down. She continued to educate all people about the risks of the disease, not only individuals in the LGBTQ community. While her primary focus was on this community throughout most of her career, the effort and research she put into learning about this disease helped and continue to help all those affected by HIV.

== AIDS ==
In Dritz's days, AIDS was often coined "gay plague" or "gay cancer". She rejected these terms, emphasizing the official term "acquired immunodeficiency syndrome". Her children always made fun of her and teased her, calling her the "den mother of the gays". While she made some unpopular decisions, like shutting down public bath houses for a time, she knew minimizing risk would reduce deaths.

Dr. Dritz was featured in And The Band Played On, a 1987 book by Randy Shilts about the early days of the disease. Dritz's work was featured in the film adaptation of And The Band Played On, where she was portrayed by Lily Tomlin. In the movie, two doctors are talking about needing to get a blood bank to give up data. The blood bank refused to tell them anything, so it was suggested that only "Attila the Hun" could. With a snap of his fingers, one of the doctors immediately suggested Selma Dritz, doubtlessly for her role in the prevention of the spread of AIDS.

== Personal life ==
Dritz married Dr. Harvey Fred Dritz in 1943 and had three children: Ronald, Deborah, and Ariel. Her marriage ended in divorce in 1973.

== Death ==
She died in 2008, aged 91, at the Claremont House Retirement Center in Oakland, California.

Since the death of Dritz, she has been featured throughout the study of the history of AIDS. A look into the life of Dritz is possible through the Selma Dritz Papers. The collection features pictures, correspondence, research, and other materials. These papers have allowed her work to continue into today and help not only those in the LGBTQ community but all those affected by HIV/AIDS.
