= Harold Jaffe (epidemiologist) =

American epidemiologist (born 1946)

Harold W. Jaffe
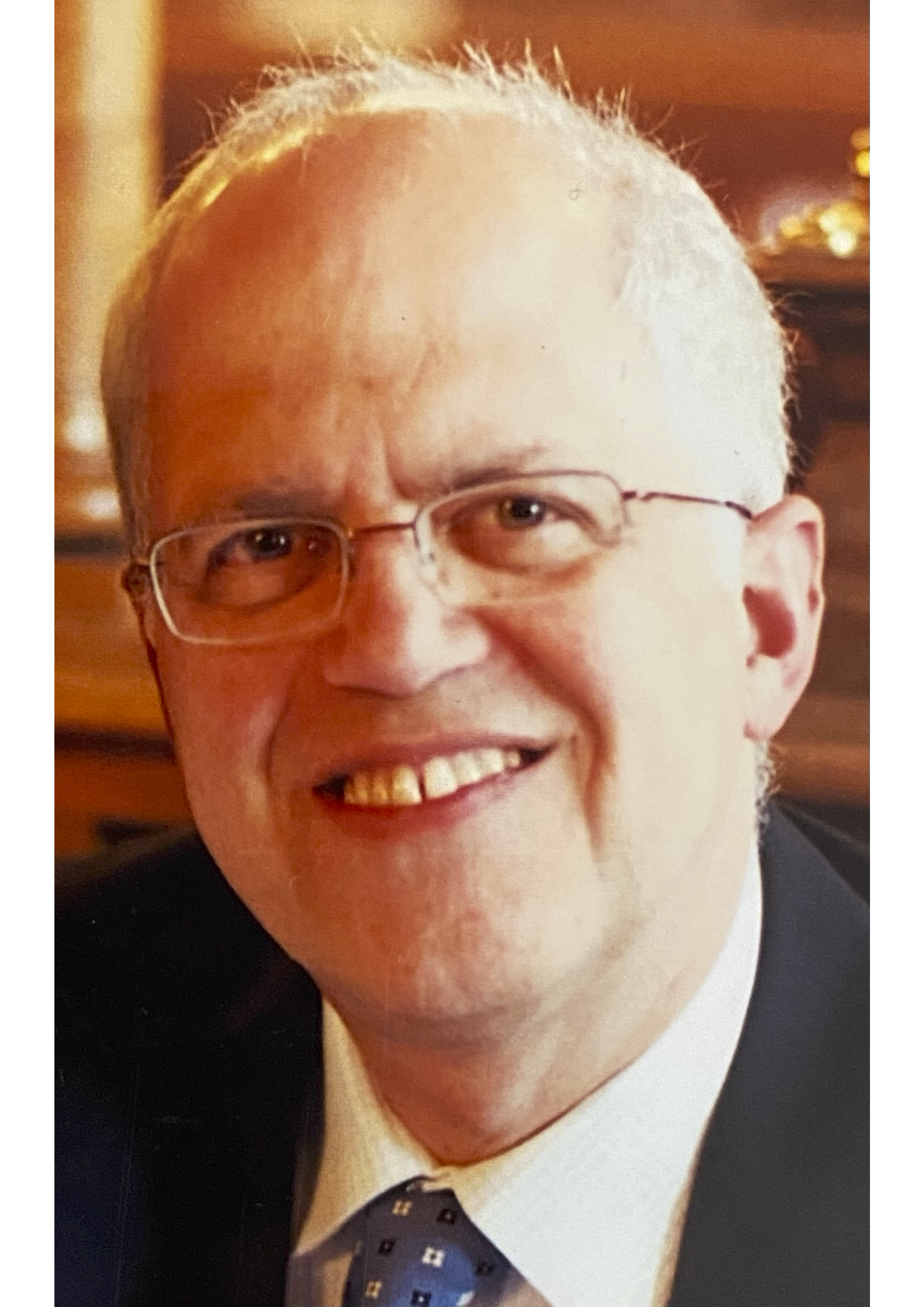
- Harold Jaffe in 2006
- Born: April 26, 1946 (age 80); Newton, Massachusetts, U.S.
- Citizenship: United States
- Education: University of California, Berkeley (BA); University of California, Los Angeles (MD)
- Known for: Public health; HIV/AIDS; Epidemiology
- Scientific career
- Fields: Epidemiology
- Workplaces: CDC; University of Oxford

Harold W. Jaffe (born April 26, 1946) is an American physician, epidemiologist, and academic. He is best known for his research on infectious diseases, especially his early research into HIV/AIDS.

== Early life and education ==
Harold Jaffe was born in Newton, Massachusetts, and moved with his family to California when he was eight years old. His father worked as a scientist at the Jet Propulsion Laboratory. Jaffe completed his undergraduate studies in genetics at the University of California, Berkeley, followed by his Doctor of Medicine (MD) degree at the University of California, Los Angeles School of Medicine. Following graduation from medical school, Jaffe completed a residency in internal medicine at UCLA Hospital. After completing his internal medicine residency, Jaffe joined the US Centers for Disease Control and Prevention (CDC) in 1974 as a clinical research investigator in the agency's Venereal Disease Control Division. After three years at the CDC, he left to complete an infectious diseases (ID) fellowship at the University of Chicago Medical Center.

== Career ==
Jaffe returned to the CDC in 1981 as an Epidemic Intelligence Service officer and began working to find the cause of AIDS, a then-unnamed disease. This work was featured in And the Band Played On, a 1987 book by Randy Shilts about the early days of the disease. He was also featured in the 1993 film adaptation, where he was portrayed by Charles Martin Smith.

He took on various roles at the CDC, including chief of the AIDS epidemiology program, deputy director for science at the HIV/AIDS program, director of the HIV/AIDS program, and director for the National Center for HIV, STD, and TB Prevention. In 2004, Jaffe left the CDC to become a professor and head of the Department of Public Health at the University of Oxford. At Oxford, he led the creation of a master's degree program in global health science. He returned to the CDC in 2010, where he remained the associate director for science until his retirement in 2016. In 2023, he published Dispatches from the AIDS Pandemic, which provides a firsthand account of the evolution of AIDS from newly recognized disease to pandemic.
