= David Dukes =

American character actor (1945–2000)

- Dukes in 1978
- Born: David Coleman Dukes; June 6, 1945; San Francisco, California, U.S.
- Died: October 9, 2000 (aged 55); Spanaway, Washington, U.S.
- Occupation: Actor
- Years active: 1970–2000
- Spouses: Carolyn McKenzie (m. 1965); Carol Muske-Dukes (before 2000)
- Children: 2

David Coleman Dukes (June 6, 1945 – October 9, 2000) was an American character actor. He had a long career in films, appearing in 35. Dukes starred in the miniseries The Winds of War and War and Remembrance, and he was a frequent television guest star. Later in life, Dukes had recurring roles on shows such as Pauly, Sisters, and Dawson's Creek.

== Early life ==
Dukes was born in San Francisco, California, the son of a California Highway Patrol officer. Dukes was the eldest of four boys; his brothers were James, Robert, and Joe Paul.

== Career ==
Dukes' film career included 35 movies. Throughout his career, he was a television guest star, notably as the man who attempted to rape Edith Bunker on All in the Family, an advertising executive on The Jeffersons, and a blind bully on Three's Company. During the 1980s, Dukes appeared in the dual miniseries The Winds of War and War and Remembrance. In 1992, he received a Primetime Emmy Award nomination for Outstanding Supporting Actor in a Limited or Anthology Series or Movie for his turn as Jo Bouillon in the HBO production The Josephine Baker Story (1991). He also appeared as Arthur Miller in the HBO film Norma Jean & Marilyn (1996). He was a series regular on the first season of the NBC network drama Sisters, playing the husband of eldest Reed sister, Alex (Swoosie Kurtz). Dukes' role became a recurring character in subsequent seasons. On Dawson's Creek, he had the recurring role of Mr. McPhee, father of Jack (Kerr Smith) and Andie (Meredith Monroe) from the second through fourth seasons. He also starred in Without a Trace as the ex-husband of Kate Nelligan.

=== Theater ===
Dukes had considerable stage experience, first appearing on Broadway in 1971. He later appeared in a revival of Molière's The School for Wives. Dukes' theatrical roles included as Dracula, Doctor Frankenstein, and Antonio Salieri in the original production of Amadeus, replacing Ian McKellen. He also replaced John Lithgow in the original production of David Henry Hwang's play M. Butterfly, and he received a Tony nomination in 1980 for best featured actor in a play for Bent. In 1998, he was one of the three characters in a London West End production of 'Art' with Stacy Keach and George Wendt.

=== Audio ===
David Dukes recorded several audiobooks, including Philip Roth's unabridged Sabbath’s Theater and Isaac Asimov's unabridged Prelude to Foundation.

== Personal life and death ==
Dukes was married to author and poet Carol Muske-Dukes.

He died of a heart attack on October 9, 2000, in Spanaway, Washington, while on location shooting the Stephen King miniseries Rose Red, which is dedicated to his memory. Dukes is interred in the Forest Lawn Memorial Park Cemetery in Glendale, California.

The season four episode "You Had Me at Goodbye" of Dawson's Creek, which aired on November 15, 2000, and in which Dukes appeared, is dedicated to his memory.

== Filmography ==
=== Film ===
Year	Title	Role	Notes
1970	The Strawberry Statement	Student Guard	
1975	The Wild Party	James Morrison	
1979	A Little Romance	George de Marco	
1980	The First Deadly Sin	Daniel Blank	
1981	Only When I Laugh	David	
1983	Without a Trace	Graham Selky	
1986	Rawhead Rex	Howard Hallenbeck	
1986	The Men's Club	Phillip	
1987	Catch the Heat	Waldo Tarr	
1987	Date with an Angel	Ed Winston	
1988	Deadly Intent	Myron Weston	Direct-to-video
1989	See You in the Morning	Peter Goodwin	
1990	The Handmaid's Tale	Doctor	Uncredited
1990	Killer Instinct	Bo Peterson	
1991	Under Surveillance	Dr. Glassman	
1993	Me and the Kid	Victor Feldman	
1996	Fled	Chris Paine	
1997	Tinseltown	Jake	
1998	Gods and Monsters	David Lewis	
1998	Slappy and the Stinkers	Spencer Dane Sr.	
1999	Goosed	Steffon Stevens	
2000	Tick Tock	Holden Avery	
2001	Alex in Wonder	Joseph Bloomfield	Posthumous role

=== Television ===
Year	Title	Role	Notes
1970	The Virginian	Lad Dormer	Episode: "Train of Darkness"
1974	Harry O	Joe Heston	Episode: "Coinage of the Realm"
1974	Cannon	Ted Anschluss	Episode: "The Avenger"
1974, 1977	Police Story	Jake / Lamont	2 episodes
1975	Great Performances	Guido Venanzi	Episode: "The Rules of the Game"
1975	The Wide World of Mystery	Harry 163	Episode: "The Norming of Jack 243"
1975	Beacon Hill	Robert Lassiter	11 episodes
1975	Valley Forge	Lt. Cutting	Television film
1976	The Jeffersons	Cal Roberts	Episode: "George and the President"
1976	One Day at a Time	Byron De Veer	Episode: "The Maestro"
1977	Police Woman	McCormick	Episode: "Deadline: Death"
1977	Family	Calvin Manners	Episode: "...More Things in Heaven and Earth"
1977	Handle with Care	O'Brian	Television film
1977	All That Glitters	Marshall Hart	Episode #1.65
1977	Barney Miller	Brad Laneer	Episode: "Corporation"
1977	All in the Family	Lambert	Episode: "Edith's 50th Birthday"
1977	79 Park Avenue	Mike Koshko	3 episodes
1978	Three's Company	Jim Walsh	Episode: "Jack's Navy Pal"
1978	Hawaii Five-O	Willy Barker	Episode: "When Does a War End?"
1978	Go West, Young Girl	Reverend Crane	Television film
1978	The Many Loves of Arthur	Dr. Chase	Television film
1978	A Fire in the Sky	David Allen	Television film
1979	Some Kind of Miracle	Joe Dine	Television film
1979	The Triangle Factory Fire Scandal	Lou Ribin	Television film
1979	How the West Was Won	Louis Riel	Episode: "L'Affaire Riel"
1979	Mayflower: The Pilgrims' Adventure	Myles Standish	Television film
1980	Portrait of a Rebel: The Remarkable Mrs. Sanger	Bill Sanger	Television film
1982	Miss All-American Beauty	Avery McPherson	Television film
1983	The Winds of War	Leslie Slote	7 episodes
1984	Sentimental Journey	Bill Gardner	Television film
1984	George Washington	William Fairfax	3 episodes
1984	Cat on a Hot Tin Roof	Gooper	Television film
1984	The Hitchhiker	Ted Miller	Episode: "Remembering Melody"
1985	Space	Leopold Strabismus / Martin Scorcella	5 episodes
1985	The Twilight Zone	Todd Ettinger	Episode: "If She Dies/Ye Gods"
1985	Kane & Abel	David Osborne	2 episodes
1986	Tall Tales & Legends	Levi	Episode: "My Darlin' Clementine"
1986	Alfred Hitchcock Presents	Dr. Tom Rigby	Episode: "Deadly Honeymoon"
1988	American Playhouse	Dr. Ned Darrell	Episode: "Strange Interlude: Part 1"
1988–1989	War and Remembrance	Leslie Slote	9 episodes
1989	Turn Back the Clock	Barney Powers	Television film
1990	The Bakery	Mike Kelly	Television film
1990	Snow Kill	Murdoch	Television film
1991	Held Hostage: The Sis and Jerry Levin Story	Jerry Levin	Television film
1991	The Josephine Baker Story	Jo Bouillon	Television film
1991	Wife, Mother, Murderer	Joe Hubbard	Television film
1991–1993	Sisters	Wade Halsey	19 episodes
1992	She Woke Up	Sloane Parr	Television film
1992	Look at It This Way	Tim Curtiz	3 episodes
1993	Spies	Robert Prescott	Television film
1993	And the Band Played On	Mervyn Silverman	Television film
1993	Time Trax	Kyle Fernando / Romulo Rayfield	Episode: "Mysterious Strangers"
1993–1995	The Mommies	Jack Larson	27 episodes
1995	The Surrogate	Stuart Quinn	Television film
1996	Norma Jean & Marilyn	Arthur Quinn	Television film
1996	Star Wars	Bib Fortuna	2 episodes
1997	Diagnosis: Murder	Darren Worthy	Episode: "In Defense of Murder"
1997	Last Stand at Saber River	Edward Janroe	Television film
1997	Pauly	Edward Sherman	7 episodes
1998	The Love Letter	Everett Reagle	Television film
1998	Life of the Party: The Pamela Harriman Story	Leland Hayward	Television film
1999	The Practice	Ted Lennon	Episode: "A Day in the Life"
1999	7th Heaven	Jack Brennan	Episode: "We the People"
1999	Supreme Sanction	Jordan McNamara	Television film
1999	Sliders	Thomas Michael Mallory	Episode: "Roads Taken"
1999	Ally McBeal	Johnson Biblico	Episode: "Let's Dance"
1999	Snoops	Father Batista	Episode: "Higher Calling"
1999–2000	Dawson's Creek	Joseph McPhee	7 episodes
2000	Family Law	Patrick Simpson	Episode: "A Mother's Son"
2000	Law & Order	David Moore	Episode: "Stiff"
2001	The Lot	Oscar Wilde	Episode: "Oscar's Wilde"; Posthumous role
2002	Rose Red	Professor Carl Miller	3 episodes; Posthumous role
