= Matthew Modine (song) =

2005 song by Montreal band Pony Up!

"Matthew Modine" is a 2005 song by Montreal band Pony Up! from their 2005 self-titled EP. The song describes the life of actor Matthew Modine and the band members' sexual desire for him. It is the first song they ever recorded.

== Reception ==
CMJ New Music Monthly lauded "Matthew Modine" as "hilarity" with "salacious lines" that "ultimately leave (listeners) wanting more", comparing it to Toni Basil's "Mickey". The Village Voice described it as "deceptively simple", with "kicky naughtiness" in its lyrics and "'50s girl-group ooohs and ahhhhs and 'Surfin' Bird' papa-oom-mow-mows" in its vocals.

Exclaim! called it "infectious", stating that listeners may "want to hate" it, but that it is nonetheless "hard to resist"; similarly, NOW categorized it as "bubble-gum" and "a perfect popcult novelty hit."

PopMatters, however, found the song to have "forehead-smacking lyrics", and to be "the most obvious" example of the album's "over-cuteness". The Indiana Daily Student faulted the song's vocals as "Mates of State-esque" and "(unable to) pass the first round of American Idol", further stating that the "Yoko Ono-esque orgasmic shrieking" at the song's conclusion is "obnoxious", and that the lyrics' description of female sexual arousal is "yucky".

== Modine's reaction ==
In a 2006 interview, the band's co-vocalist Laura Wills reported that Modine's manager had contacted them and offered to arrange a meeting — "If you're ever in the New York area, let us know. He'd like to meet you," — but specified that no such meeting occurred; however, Wills emphasized that Modine "definitely heard (the song) and apparently thought it was funny".
