= When I Was a Boy (film) =

- Directed by: Todd Field; Matthew Modine; Alex Vlacos
- Written by: Todd Field; Matthew Modine; Alex Vlacos
- Starring: Philip Forman
- Cinematography: Alex Vlacos
- Release date: 1993
- Running time: 12 minutes
- Country: United States
- Language: English

When I Was a Boy is a 1993 short film directed by Todd Field, Alex Vlacos and Matthew Modine. It is an experimental piece about a grown man reflecting on how he was reared by his mother and treated by others as a child. The piece premiered at the 1993 Sundance Film Festival in front of Victor Nuñez's Grand Jury Prize winning Ruby in Paradise in which Field stars and Vlacos was the cinematographer. That same year it was exhibited at the Museum of Modern Art as part of the Film Society of Lincoln Center's New Directors/New Films Festival.
