= Mervyn Silverman =

American Physician

San Francisco Director of Health
- In office 1977–1985

Personal details
- Born: Mervyn Frank Silverman
- Spouse: Deborah
- Children: 3
- Education: Washington and Lee University, Harvard School of Public Health, Tulane University School of Medicine

Mervyn F. Silverman is an American physician and public health supervisor. He is best known for serving as director of health in San Francisco from 1977 to 1985, overseeing the city's initial response to AIDS. From 2011 onwards, he serves as Secretary of the Board of Trustees for amfAR. He has also been director of health for Wichita, Kansas; medical director of Planned Parenthood of Kansas; director of the Robert Wood Johnson AIDS Health Services Program; director of the Office of Consumer Affairs for the Food and Drug Administration; and director of the East Asia and Pacific Regional Medical Office of the Peace Corps.

== Education ==
Silverman received his B.S. from Washington and Lee University, his M.D. from Tulane University School of Medicine, and his M.P.H. from Harvard School of Public Health.

== Response to AIDS while San Francisco Health Director ==
On October 9, 1984, he ordered the immediate closure of fourteen bathhouses and sex clubs, arguing that their permissive attitude to on-site sexual contact was "fostering disease and death" because of the potential to spread AIDS. Leaders of the gay community, such as Cleve Jones, were unable or unwilling to back him in this effort because of potential backlash. That backlash did happen, with heated debate over public health concerns versus the civil rights of homosexuals. Indeed, Silverman received death threats as a result, ultimately leading to his resignation. Two months later, a "superior court ordered reopening on the condition that sexual activities be policed by the bathhouse management."

At the same time, Silverman was using organizations like the RWJ Foundations to fund grants for community-based programs to meet local needs.

While testifying on behalf of the Ryan White CARE Act, he advocated funding for early interventions: “The importance of early medical intervention has dramatically increased the number of Americans urgently in need of HIV-related care—up to 1 million Americans are in imminent risk of developing very serious and costly AIDS-related illnesses unless this early intervention is available to slow the progression of their HIV infection. Early intervention is but a cruel myth if the treatments are available and people cannot afford them. Medicaid funding for early intervention is essential.”

== Honors and awards ==
- Honorary Doctor of Science from Washington and Lee University
- Public Health Heroes Award from the University of California, Berkeley
- Hero in Medicine Award from the Association of Physicians in AIDS Care
- Award for Courageous Leadership from the San Francisco Foundation
- amfAR's Award of Courage.

== Popular culture ==
- Silverman played an important role in both the book and film versions of And The Band Played On by Randy Shilts.
- Featured in CNN's series on The 80s and HBO's documentary on amfAR.

== Personal life ==
He and his wife have three daughters.
