= Bill Kraus =

American activist (1947–1986)

- Born: William James Kraus; June 26, 1947; Fort Mitchell, Kentucky, U.S.
- Died: January 11, 1986 (aged 38); San Francisco, California, U.S.
- Education: St. Xavier High School; Ohio State University

William James Kraus (June 26, 1947 – January 11, 1986) was an American gay rights and AIDS activist as well as a congressional aide who served as liaison between the San Francisco gay community and its two successive US representatives in the early 1980s.

== Early years ==
Kraus was born in Fort Mitchell, Kentucky. His father died when he was in his early teens. Kraus was a 1965 graduate of St. Xavier High School in Cincinnati, Ohio and was a national merit scholar. He attended Dartmouth College for a semester and then Ohio State University from which he graduated with a bachelor's degree in history and master's degree in political science. He went on to become an aide to U.S. representatives Phillip and Sala Burton.

== Political career and AIDS activist ==
Kraus moved to San Francisco in 1970 where he learned to practice politics from the Castro camera store owner and later City Supervisor Harvey Milk, who was among the first openly gay elected officials in the United States. After Milk's assassination in 1978, he helped Harry Britt to be elected as Milk's successor on the City Council. Kraus later became president of the Harvey Milk Democratic Club.

Kraus accepted a job as liaison to the gay community for US Congressman Phillip Burton and, after Burton's death in 1983, to his widow Sala Burton who was elected to succeed her husband. Together, they worked on legislation to authorize funding to fight the AIDS epidemic. Through the Harvey Milk Democratic Club, Kraus conducted a "safe sex" campaign, attempting to bring awareness to the gay community of the dangers of unsafe sexual practices. Part of his campaign was to urge the closing of San Francisco's gay bathhouses, a recommendation that was severely criticized by some in the city's gay community who called Kraus a "sexual Nazi" for viewing the bathhouses as a problem.

Kraus was himself diagnosed with the disease in October 1984. He traveled to Paris to be treated with the drug HPA-23, believed at the time to boost the immune systems of AIDS patients. In Kraus' case, it proved useless. He was in Paris when actor Rock Hudson arrived to pursue the same treatment. When it became clear the drug had failed, Kraus returned home to San Francisco where he died on January 11, 1986, at the age of 38.

After his death, his mother worked to continue his activism and raise awareness about AIDS.

== Media ==
Kraus appears in the 1984 documentary film The Times of Harvey Milk. He was also a central figure in Randy Shilts' book And the Band Played On about the early response to the AIDS epidemic. In 1993, the book was adapted into the HBO film of the same name, with actor Ian McKellen playing Kraus. The film dramatized, with some artistic license, both the book and real events in the life of Kraus.
