= Don Francis =

American epidemiologist

Donald Pinkston Francis
- Born: San Francisco Bay Area, California, United States
- Spouse: Diana Lee Francis
- Scientific career
- Fields: Epidemiology
- Workplaces: CDC; Genentech, Inc. VaxGen; Global Solutions for Infectious Diseases

Donald Pinkston Francis (born October 24, 1942) is an American physician and epidemiologist who worked on the Ebola outbreak in Africa in the late 1970s, and as an HIV/AIDS researcher. He retired from the U.S. Public Health Service in 1992, after 21 years of service. He lives in San Francisco, California.

== Early life and education ==
Francis was born on October 24, 1942, in the San Francisco Bay Area of California. He grew up in Marin County, and his main interest was skiing. His mother, father, and grandfather were physicians. However, he was a poor student as a child and had dyslexia. Francis has said that he gravitated towards science because he had such difficulty with subjects where fluent reading ability was needed.

Francis completed his undergraduate studies at the University of California, Berkeley, where he was a member of the California chapter at Delta Upsilon, class of 1966. He received his M.D. from Northwestern University and his Doctor of Science in virology from Harvard. An infectious diseases fellowship at Harvard followed his internship and residency in pediatrics at the University of California Medical Center in Los Angeles. In order to avoid being drafted in the Vietnam War, he applied and was accepted into the Epidemic Intelligence Service at the CDC. Francis helped eradicate smallpox from Sudan, India and Bangladesh before working on AIDS. He worked on the cholera epidemic in Nigeria in the early 1970s, the smallpox epidemic in Yugoslavia in 1972, and the 1976 Ebola epidemic in Sudan. In addition, Francis was an early developer of the hepatitis B vaccine in the United States and China.

== Later work ==
Francis began his work on AIDS in 1981. He was one of the first scientists to suggest that AIDS was caused by an infectious agent. As director of the CDC's AIDS Laboratory Activities, he worked closely with the Institut Pasteur which isolated HIV.

At the time of his retirement from the CDC, he was the centers' AIDS Advisor to the State of California and Special Consultant to Mayor Art Agnos in San Francisco. In the latter capacity he served as the Chair of the Mayor's HIV Task Force.

In 1993, Francis joined Genentech, Inc., of South San Francisco to try to develop a vaccine for HIV. In 1995, Francis and fellow retro-virologist Dr. Robert Nowinski spun off Genentech's HIV vaccine unit after the company had disappointing results, and founded VaxGen, based in Brisbane, California, to continue working on vaccines. After the vaccine failed in clinical trials, Francis left VaxGen in 2004 to co-found Global Solutions for Infectious Diseases, where he serves as executive director and principal investigator.

== And The Band Played On ==
In 1993, HBO produced And The Band Played On, an Emmy Award-winning movie about the AIDS crisis based on the 1987 book of the same name by San Francisco Chronicle journalist Randy Shilts. Actor Matthew Modine plays Francis, a central figure in the movie. In both the book and the film, his antagonist is Dr. Robert Gallo (portrayed in the film by Alan Alda), the discoverer of HTLV (the human T-cell lymphotropic virus), who cuts off assistance when he hears that Francis has shared some experimental materials with Françoise Barré-Sinoussi and Luc Montagnier (portrayed in the film by Nathalie Baye and Patrick Bauchau), the French researchers at the Pasteur Institute who were given the Nobel Prize for their discovery of the HIV virus.
