= Arnold Schulman =

American dramatist (1925–2023)

- Born: August 11, 1925; Philadelphia, Pennsylvania, U.S.
- Died: February 4, 2023 (aged 97); Santa Monica, California, U.S.
- Occupations: Writer, producer, songwriter, actor

Arnold Schulman (August 11, 1925 – February 4, 2023) was an American playwright, screenwriter, producer, songwriter and novelist. He was a stage actor long associated with the American Theatre Wing and the Actors Studio.

== Biography ==
Born to a Jewish family in Philadelphia, Pennsylvania, Schulman attended the University of North Carolina where he took writing courses. He served with the U.S. Navy during World War II, and in 1946 came to New York City, where he began to write in earnest. He studied playwriting with Robert Anderson (Tea and Sympathy) in classes at New York's American Theatre Wing, scripted for television during the early 1950s, making a transition to Hollywood films in 1957.

Schulman died at his Santa Monica home on February 4, 2023, at the age of 97.

== Awards ==
Schulman received Oscar nominations for Best Original Screenplay for Love with the Proper Stranger in 1963 and for Best Adapted Screenplay for Goodbye, Columbus in 1969. He also received three Writers Guild nominations for Best Screenplay for Wild Is the Wind, A Hole in the Head and Love with the Proper Stranger, and a Writers Guild award for Goodbye, Columbus. He was also the recipient of a Humanitas Prize award in 1994 for his work on And the Band Played On.

Schulman was credited as the screenwriter of Players, although the script was rewritten without his consent, and by contract he wasn't able to take his name off.

== Credits ==
- 1954 General Electric Theater: I'm a Fool (Teleplay)
- 1954 Omnibus: Nothing So Monstrous (Teleplay)
- 1955 Kraft Television Theatre: The Beautiful Time (Teleplay)
- 1956 Playwrights '56: Adam and Evening; Lost; The Heart's a Forgotten Hotel (Teleplays)
- 1957 Wild Is the Wind (Screenwriter)
- 1959 A Hole in the Head (Screenwriter)
- 1960 Cimarron (Screenwriter)
- 1963 Jennie (Book of Broadway musical)
- 1963 Love with the Proper Stranger (Screenwriter)
- 1968 The Night They Raided Minsky's (Screenwriter)
- 1969 Goodbye, Columbus (Screenwriter)
- 1972 To Find a Man (Screenwriter)
- 1975 Funny Lady (Screenwriter/Book Author)
- 1976 Won Ton Ton, the Dog Who Saved Hollywood (Producer/Screenwriter)
- 1979 Players (Executive Producer/Producer/Screenwriter)
- 1985 A Chorus Line (Screenwriter)
- 1988 Tucker: The Man and His Dream (Songwriter/Screenwriter)
- 1993 And the Band Played On (Co-producer/Screenwriter)

== Bibliography ==
- Schulman, Arnold. Baba. Viking Press, New York, 1971. (Biography of Schulman's guru Sathya Sai Baba)
