= Pony Up! =

Canadian indie pop band

Pony Up
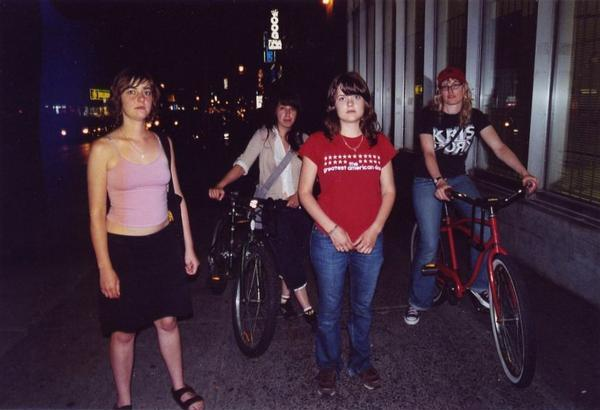

Background information
- Origin: Montreal, Quebec, Canada
- Genres: Indie pop
- Years active: 2002–2009
- Labels: Laughing Outlaw, Ten Fingers (current), Dim Mak (former)
- Members: Lisa J. Smith; Lindsay Wills; Laura Wills; Sarah Moundroukas
- Past members: Camilla Wynne Ingr

Pony Up was an all-woman Canadian indie pop band based in Montreal, Quebec. They were known for their guitar-and-keyboard-based, upbeat music and their personal and sometimes sexually suggestive lyrics.

== History ==
Pony Up! was formed on New Year's Eve 2002 by bassist Lisa Smith, drummer Lindsay Wills, keyboardist Laura Wills, guitarist Sarah Moundroukas, and vocalist Camilla Wynne Ingr. Their debut, a self-titled EP (which included their song "Matthew Modine"), was released in 2005 on Steve Aoki's label, Dim Mak.

In April 2006, Pony Up released their first full-length album, Make Love to the Judges with Your Eyes. To promote it, the band toured Australia in the summer of 2006, where their single "The Truth About Cats and Dogs (Is That They Die)" would later be voted No. 47 on Triple J's Hottest 100.

In September 2008, Pony Up supported The Mountain Goats on tour. Smith and Laura Wills joined the touring lineup of The Dears.

The band's third album, Stay Gold, was released in the spring of 2009.

== Discography ==
- Pony Up! (2005, EP)
- Make Love to the Judges with Your Eyes (2006)
- Stay Gold (2009)

== Band members ==
=== Current members ===
- Lisa J. Smith – bass guitar
- Lindsay Wills – drums
- Laura Wills – keyboards and vocals
- Sarah Moundroukas – guitar and vocals

=== Former members ===
- Camilla Wynne Ingr - also in the band Sunset Rubdown

== Music videos ==
Song	Released	Director	Album	Notes
"The Truth About Cats and Dogs (Is That They Die)"	2006	Toben Seymour	Make Love to the Judges with Your Eyes	Shadow puppetry and animation by Moving Pictures
