= Matthew Modine =

American actor (born 1959)

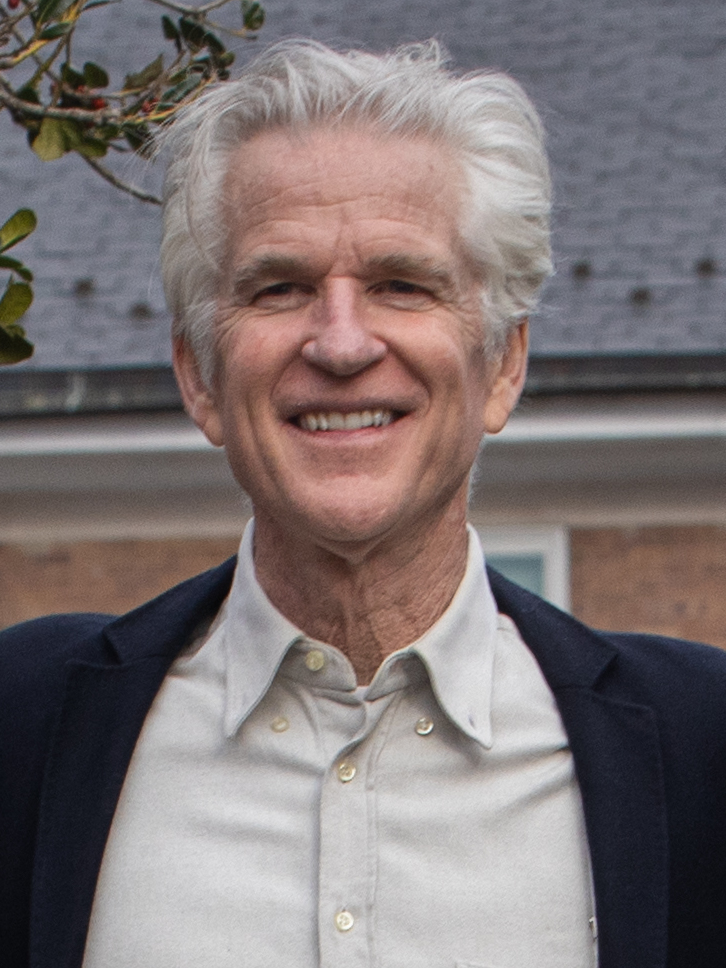
- Modine in 2024
- Born: Matthew Avery Modine; March 22, 1959 (age 67); Loma Linda, California, U.S.
- Occupations: Actor; director; producer; screenwriter
- Years active: 1982–present
- Spouse: Caridad Rivera (m. 1980)
- Children: 2, including Ruby Modine
- Website: matthewmodine.com

Matthew Avery Modine (/moʊˈdiːn/ mo-DEEN; born March 22, 1959) is an American actor and filmmaker. He shared the Venice Film Festival‘s Volpi Cup for Best Actor as part of the ensemble cast of Robert Altman’s film Streamers (1983). He went on to play lead roles in several high-profile films throughout the 1980s, including Birdy (1984), Vision Quest (1985), and Married to the Mob (1988). He gained further prominence for playing U.S. Marine James T. "Joker" Davis in Stanley Kubrick's Full Metal Jacket (1987).

Other notable films include Pacific Heights (1990), Short Cuts (1993), Cutthroat Island (1995), The Dark Knight Rises (2012), and Oppenheimer (2023). On television, he portrayed Dr. Don Francis in the HBO film And the Band Played On (1993), Sullivan Groff on Weeds (2007), Ivan Turing in Proof (2015), and Dr. Martin Brenner on Netflix's Stranger Things (2016–2017; 2022).

Modine has been nominated twice for a Golden Globe Award for Best Actor in a Miniseries or Motion Picture Made for Television for his work in And the Band Played On and What the Deaf Man Heard and received a special Golden Globe for him and the rest of the ensemble in Short Cuts. He was also nominated for a Primetime Emmy Award for Outstanding Lead Actor in a Miniseries or a Special for And the Band Played On.

== Early life and education ==
Modine, the youngest of seven children, was born on March 22, 1959, in Loma Linda, California, the son of Dolores (née Warner), a bookkeeper, and Mark Alexander Modine, who managed drive-in theaters. He is the nephew of the stage actress Nola Modine Fairbanks, and the great-grandson of the prospector and pioneer Ralph Jacobus Fairbanks. One of his other great-grandfathers was a Swedish immigrant. Modine lived in Utah for several years, moving every year or two. The drive-in theaters managed by his father were later demolished as the value of the underlying land surpassed the economic value of operating the theaters. The Modine family returned to Imperial Beach, California, where Matthew attended and graduated from Mar Vista High School in 1977.

== Career ==
=== Film ===
Modine's first film role was in John Sayles' film Baby It's You (1983). Also that year, he co-starred in the sex comedy Private School, with Phoebe Cates and Betsy Russell. His performances caught the eye of director Harold Becker, who cast him in Vision Quest (1985, filmed 1983), based on Terry Davis's novel. The director Robert Altman propelled Modine to international stardom with his 1983 film adaptation of David Rabe's play Streamers. Modine played Mel Gibson's brother in Mrs. Soffel (1984) and starred with Nicolas Cage in Alan Parker's Birdy (1984); the film was awarded Grand Prix at the Cannes Film Festival. Modine turned down the role of LT Pete "Maverick" Mitchell in Top Gun (played by Tom Cruise), because he felt the film's pro-military stance went against his politics.

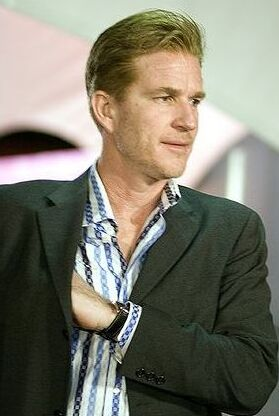
Modine in 2006

Modine may be best known for his role as Private/Sergeant J.T. "Joker" Davis, the central character of Stanley Kubrick's Vietnam War film Full Metal Jacket (1987). Subsequently, Modine played the dangerous young criminal Treat in Alan Pakula's 1987 film adaptation of Lyle Kessler's stageplay Orphans. Modine played the goofy, earnest FBI agent Mike Downey in Jonathan Demme's screwball comedy Married to the Mob (1988) opposite Michelle Pfeiffer. In 1990, he led the cast of Memphis Belle, a fictionalized account of the B-17 Flying Fortress. Modine's subsequent roles included Drake Goodman in the thriller Pacific Heights (1990), Dr. Don Francis in the HBO film And the Band Played On (1993), and Dr. Ralph Wyman in the Robert Altman film Short Cuts (1993). For his work in And the Band Played On, he was nominated for a Golden Globe Award for Best Actor in a Miniseries or Motion Picture Made for Television and for a Primetime Emmy Award for Outstanding Lead Actor in a Miniseries or a Special, and for his work in Short Cuts, he received a special Golden Globe Award for the ensemble cast.

In 1995, Modine appeared opposite Geena Davis in the romantic action-adventure film Cutthroat Island. He was nominated for a second Golden Globe Award for Best Actor in a Miniseries or Motion Picture Made for Television for his work in the 1997 television film What the Deaf Man Heard. Modine made his feature directorial debut with If... Dog... Rabbit... (1999), which came after the success of three short films debuting at the Sundance Film Festival: When I Was a Boy, co-directed with Todd Field; Smoking, written by David Sedaris; and Ecce Pirate, written by Modine. Also in 1999, he appeared in Oliver Stone's football drama Any Given Sunday.

In 2003, he guest-starred in The West Wing episode "The Long Goodbye". He portrayed the character Marco, who went to high school with C.J. Cregg (Allison Janney) and who helped her deal with her father's steady mental decline due to Alzheimer's disease. Modine agreed to take the role because he is a longtime friend of Janney. (The two appeared together in a theatrical production of the play Breaking Up directed by Stuart Ross). That same year, he played Fritz Gerlich in the CBS miniseries Hitler: The Rise of Evil (2003).

In 2004, Modine appeared in Funky Monkey as ex-football star turned spy Alec McCall, who teams up with super-chimp Clemens and his friend Michael Dean (Seth Adkins) to take down the villainous Flick (Taylor Negron). The film was critically panned, yet has gained a cult status. In 2005, Abel Ferrara's Mary won the Special Jury Prize at the Venice Film Festival. In the film, Modine portrays a director recounting the story of Mary Magdalene (Juliette Binoche). The following year, he guest-starred in the Law & Order: Special Victims Unit episode "Rage" as a serial killer of young girls. In 2010, Modine appeared in The Trial, which was awarded the Parents Television Council's Seal of Approval™. The PTC said: "'The Trial' combines the best features of courtroom drama, murder mystery, and character story. 'The Trial' is a powerful drama which shows the power of healing and hope." Modine played a corrupt Majestic City developer named "Sullivan Groff" throughout Season 3 on Weeds. Groff has affairs with Nancy Botwin (Mary-Louise Parker) and Celia Hodes (Elizabeth Perkins). Also in 2010, Modine appeared in HBO's Too Big to Fail, a film about the 2008 financial crisis. Modine stars as John Thain, former chairman and CEO of Merrill Lynch.

His dark comedy I Think I Thought (2008) debuted at the Tribeca Film Festival. The film tells the story of a Thinker (Modine) who ends up in Thinkers Anonymous. Other short films include To Kill an American, Cowboy, and The Love Film. In 2011, he completed Jesus Was a Commie, an avant-garde-dialectical conversation about the world and the prominent issues of modern society. Modine co-directed the short film with Terence Ziegler, the editor of I Think I Thought. Modine's short films have played internationally. Modine completed two more independent films, Family Weekend (2013) and Girl in Progress (2012), opposite Eva Mendes. In 2012, he appeared in Christopher Nolan's The Dark Knight Rises as Deputy Commissioner Peter Foley, a Gotham City police officer and peer to Gary Oldman's Commissioner James Gordon. In February 2013, Modine was cast in Ralph Bakshi's animated film Last Days of Coney Island after coming across the film's Kickstarter campaign online. In 2014, he co-starred with Olivia Williams, Richard Dillane, and Steve Oram in the horror mystery film Altar. In 2015, he played Ivan Turing in the TNT supernatural medical drama Proof.

In 2016, Modine played Dr. Martin Brenner in the Netflix original series Stranger Things. In 2017, he and his Stranger Things castmates won the Screen Actors Guild Award for Outstanding Performance by an Ensemble in a Drama Series. In 2017, Matthew Modine was featured in the music video for "1-800-273-8255", a song by American hip hop artist Logic. Modine was part of Speed Kills released in November 2018 as well as Foster Boy and Miss Virginia. In 2023, he starred in The Martini Shot, a drama film directed by Stephen Wallis. In 2023 he portrayed Vannevar Bush in Christopher Nolan's biographical thriller Oppenheimer.

=== Theater ===
Modine appeared in Arthur Miller's Finishing the Picture at Chicago's Goodman Theatre, in Miller's Resurrection Blues at London's Old Vic, and in a stage adaptation of Harper Lee's To Kill a Mockingbird (as Atticus Finch) at Connecticut's Hartford Stage (This production of To Kill a Mockingbird became the most successful play in the theatre's 45-year history), and in 2022/23 at London's Gielgud Theatre. In 2010, he starred with Abigail Breslin in the 50th Anniversary Broadway revival of The Miracle Worker at the Circle in the Square theatre.

In fall 2013, Modine starred in a self-parodying comedy, Matthew Modine Saves the Alpacas at Los Angeles' Geffen Theatre.

== Personal life ==
Modine married Caridad Rivera, a makeup and wardrobe stylist, in 1980. They have two children: Boman, an assistant film director; and Ruby Modine, an actress, singer and ballet dancer.

Modine is the subject of the 2005 song "Matthew Modine" by Pony Up.

=== Activism ===
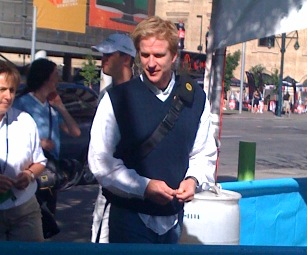
Modine participating in a bike sharing event during the 2008 Democratic National Convention

Cycling has been Modine's main mode of transportation since he moved to New York City from Utah in 1980. He heads a pro-bike organization called "Bicycle for a Day" and was honored for his work on June 2, 2009, by the environmental arts and education center on the East River, Solar 1.

In 2019, Modine ran unsuccessfully for SAG-AFTRA national presidential election, challenging incumbent Gabrielle Carteris. Modine's campaign manager and a number of other union members filed protests after the result, alleging election violations. The complaints were unsuccessful, and the investigation found no reason to set aside Cateris's election. Modine ran again in 2021 and was defeated by Fran Drescher by a margin of 52.5% to 47.5%.

== Filmography ==
=== Film ===
Key
†	Denotes films that have not yet been released

Year	Title	Role	Notes
1983	Baby It's You	Steve	
1983	Private School	Jim Green	
1983	Streamers	Billy	
1984	The Hotel New Hampshire	Chip Dove / Ernst	
1984	Birdy	'Birdy'	
1984	Mrs. Soffel	Jack Biddle	
1985	Vision Quest	Louden Swain	
1987	Full Metal Jacket	Private/Sergeant J.T. "Joker" Davis	
1987	Orphans	Treat	
1988	Married to the Mob	FBI Agent Mike Downey	
1988	The Gamble	Francesco Sacredo	
1989	Gross Anatomy	Joe Slovak	
1990	Memphis Belle	Captain Dennis Dearborn	
1990	Pacific Heights	Drake Goodman	
1992	Equinox	Henry Petosa / Freddy 'Ace'	
1992	Wind	Will Parker	
1993	When I Was a Boy	None	Short film; Co-writer, co-director and co-producer
1993	The Tree	Boy as Middle-Aged Man / Boy as Old Man	Short film
1993	Short Cuts	Dr. Ralph Wyman	
1994	The Browning Version	Frank Hunter	
1994	Smoking	None	Short film; Director and producer
1995	Bye Bye Love	Dave Goldman	
1995	Fluke	Thomas P. Johnson / Voice of Fluke	
1995	Cutthroat Island	William Shaw	
1997	Ecce Pirate	None	Short film; Writer, director and producer
1997	The Blackout	Matty	
1997	The Maker	Walter Schmeiss	
1997	The Real Blonde	Joe	
1999	Notting Hill	Movie-Within-Movie Actor	Uncredited
1999	If... Dog... Rabbit...	Johnnie Cooper	Also writer and director
1999	Any Given Sunday	Dr. Ollie Powers	
2000	Very Mean Men	Bartender	
2000	Bamboozled	Himself	
2001	Nobody's Baby	'Sonny'	
2001	In the Shadows	Eric O'Byrne	
2001	The Shipment	Mitch Garrett	
2003	Overnight	Himself	
2003	Le Divorce	Tellman	
2003	Hollywood North	Bobby Myers	
2004	Funky Monkey	Alec McCall	
2005	Transporter 2	Senator Jeff Billings	
2005	Mary	Tony Childress / Jesus	
2005	Opa!	Eric	
2006	Kettle of Fish	Mel	Also executive producer
2007	Go Go Tales	Johnie Ruby	
2007	Have Dreams, Will Travel	Ben's Father	
2007	The Neighbor	Jeff	
2008	I Think I Thought	Joe	Short film; Also writer, director and producer
2008	To Kill an American	None	Writer, director and producer
2008	Cowboy	Cowboy	Short film; Also writer and director
2008	Mia and the Migoo	Mr. Houston / Godfrey	Voice, English dub
2008	The Garden of Eden	David's Father	
2008	Santa, the Fascist Years	Narrator	Short film; Voice
2009	Little Fish, Strange Pond	Mr. Jack	Also executive producer
2010	The Trial	Mac	Also producer
2010	A Cat in Paris	Lucas	Voice, English dub
2011	Jesus Was a Commie	John Doe	Short film; Also writer, director and producer
2011	Sunchasers	None	Producer
2011	Wrinkles	Juan	Voice, English dub
2011	The Flying House	'Bertie'	Short film; Also executive producer
2012	Somebody	None	Short film; Writer, director and producer
2012	Plastic Jesus	None	Short film; Writer, director and producer
2012	Girl in Progress	Dr. Harford	
2012	The Dark Knight Rises	Peter Foley	
2013	Jobs	John Sculley	
2013	Family Weekend	Duncan Dungy	
2013	Cheatin'	None	Executive producer
2014	Hyperion	None	Short film; Associate producer
2014	Altar	Alec Hamilton	
2014	Guests	Theodore Foster	Short film
2015	The Brainwashing of My Dad	Narrator	Documentary film; Also producer
2015	The Heyday of the Insensitive Bastards	Theodore Foster	
2015	Last Days of Coney Island	None	Short film; Executive producer
2015	Merry Xmas	Abe	Also writer and producer
2015	Unity	Narrator	
2016	The Confirmation	Kyle	
2016	Alex & Co: How to Grow Up Despite Your Parents	Bob Riley	
2016	Revengeance	Sid	Uncredited; Also executive producer
2016	Super Sex	None	Short film; Writer, director and producer
2016	Army of One	Dr. Ross	
2016	Stars in Shorts: No Ordinary Love	Abe	Also co-writer, co-director and co-producer
2017	The Hippopotamus	Michael Logan	
2017	47 Meters Down	Captain Taylor	
2018	Sicario: Day of the Soldado	James Riley	
2018	Speed Kills	George H. W. Bush	
2018	An Actor Prepares	Charlie	
2018	Backtrace	MacDonald	
2019	Keepers of the Wild	None	Short documentary film; Executive producer
2019	Foster Boy	Michael Trainer	
2019	Miss Virginia	Congressman Cliff Williams	
2020	Guardians of Life	Senior Physician	Short film
2020	Chance	Mike	
2021	Breaking News in Yuba County	Carl Buttons	
2021	Wrong Turn	Scott Shaw	
2021	Operation Varsity Blues: The College Admissions Scandal	Rick Singer	
2022	My Love Affair with Marriage	Bo	Voice; also executive producer
2023	Hard Miles	Greg Townsend	
2023	Oppenheimer	Vannevar Bush	
2023	The Martini Shot	Steve	
2023	Retribution	Anders Muller	
2025	Protector	Colonel Lavelle	
2027	Godzilla x Kong: Supernova †	TBA	Filming
TBA	Vivien & the Florist †	Joseph Penn	Post-production

=== Television ===
Year	Title	Role	Notes
1982	ABC Afterschool Special	Randy	Episode: "Amy & the Angel"
1988	American Playhouse	Eugene O'Neill	Episode: "Journey Into Genius"
1988	Saturday Night Live	Host	Episode: "Matthew Modine/Edie Brickell & New Bohemians"
1993	And the Band Played On	Dr. Don Francis	Television film
1994	Jacob	Jacob	Television film
1995–1998	The New Adventures of Sherlock Holmes	Sherlock Holmes	Voice; 78 episodes
1997	What the Deaf Man Heard	Sammy Ayers	Television film
1998	American Experience	Lawrence Svobida	Episode: "Surviving the Dust Bowl"
1998	The American	Christopher Newman	Television film
2000	Flowers for Algernon	Charlie Gordon	Television film
2001	Jack and the Beanstalk: The Real Story	Jack Robinson	2 episodes
2002	Redeemer	Paul Freeman	Television film
2003	The West Wing	Marco Arlens	Episode: "The Long Goodbye"
2003	Hitler: The Rise of Evil	Fritz Gerlich	2 episodes
2003	Expert Witness	Matthew McBride	Television film
2004	The Winning Season	Honus Wagner	Television film
2005	Law & Order: Special Victims Unit	Gordon Rickett	Episode: "Rage"
2005	Into the West	Samson Wheeler	Episode: "Dreams and Schemes"
2006	The Bedford Diaries	Professor Jake Macklin	8 episodes
2007	Weeds	Sullivan Groff	12 episodes
2007	Good Morning Agrestic	Sullivan Groff	Short television series; Episode: "Majestic: Gates of Hell"
2008	Sex and Lies in Sin City	Ted Binion	Television film
2011	Too Big to Fail	John Thain	Television film
2013	CAT. 8	Dr. Michael Ranger	2 episodes
2013	Anatomy of Violence	Convict #3	Television film
2015	Proof	Ivan Turing	10 episodes
2016–2017, 2022	Stranger Things	Dr. Martin Brenner	16 episodes
2017	Idiotsitter	Dr. J. Lowe	3 episodes
2019	Sanctuary	Dr. Fisher	8 episodes
2019	Surveillance	The Man in the Red Tie	Television film
2025	Zero Day	Richard Dreyer	6 episodes
2025	The Better Sister	Bill Braddock	8 episodes
2025	The Simpsons	Dr. Leonard Stern	Voice; episode: "Bad Boys... for Life?"

=== Music videos ===
Year	Title	Artist	Notes	Ref.
1985	"Crazy for You"	Madonna	From the film Vision Quest	
1985	"Gambler"	Madonna	From the film Vision Quest	
2017	"1-800-273-8255"	Logic		
2020	"What a Man Gotta Do"	Jonas Brothers		

=== Theater ===
Year	Play	Role	Venue	Ref.
2004	Finishing the Picture	Paul	Goodman Theatre, Chicago	
2006	Resurrection Blues	Skip	The Old Vic, London	
2009	To Kill a Mockingbird	Atticus Finch	Hartford Stage, Hartford	
2010	The Miracle Worker	Captain Keller	Broadway, New York	
2013	Matthew Modine Saves the Alpacas	Himself	Geffen Playhouse, Los Angeles	
2022	To Kill a Mockingbird	Atticus Finch	Gielgud Theatre, London	

== Awards and nominations ==
Year	Association	Category	Work	Result
1983	Venice Film Festival	Best Actor	Streamers	Won
1993	Venice Film Festival	Special Volpi Cup for Best Ensemble Cast	Short Cuts	Recipient
1994	Golden Globe Awards	Special Award for Ensemble Cast (non-competitive)	Short Cuts	Recipient
1994	Golden Globe Awards	Best Actor in a Miniseries or Motion Picture Made for Television	And the Band Played On	Nominated
1994	Independent Spirit Awards	Best Male Lead	Equinox	Nominated
1994	Primetime Emmy Awards	Outstanding Lead Actor in a Miniseries or a Movie	And the Band Played On	Nominated
1997	Golden Globe Awards	Best Actor in a Miniseries or Motion Picture Made for Television	What the Deaf Man Heard	Nominated
2000	Satellite Awards	Best Actor in a Miniseries or a Motion Picture Made for Television	Flowers for Algernon	Nominated
2008	Tribeca Film Festival	Best Narrative Short	I Think I Thought	Nominated
2011	Traverse City Film Festival	Founders Prize for Best Short Film	Jesus Was a Commie	Won
2011	Oldenburg International Film Festival	Best Short Film	Jesus Was a Commie	Nominated
2011	Oldenburg International Film Festival	Walk of Fame	—N/a	Won
2012	New Media Film Festival	Best Short	Jesus Was a Commie	Nominated
2016	Tribeca Film Festival	Best Narrative Short Film	Super Sex	Nominated
2016	New Media Film Festival	Best Short	Super Sex	Won
2017	Coronado Island Film Festival	Audience Favorite Award – Favourite Short Film	Super Sex	Won
2017	Screen Actors Guild Awards	Outstanding Performance by an Ensemble in a Drama Series	Stranger Things	Won
2017	Dublin International Film Festival	Special Mention for International Short	Super Sex	Won
2023	Heartland International Film Festival	Jimmy Stewart Legacy Award, Pioneering Spirit Award	Hard Miles	Won
