= William Darrow =

American sociologist

William Ward Darrow

Academic background
- Education: University of Connecticut (BS); University of New Hampshire (MA); Emory University (PhD)

Academic work
- Discipline: Sociologist
- Institutions: Florida International University; Centers for Disease Control and Prevention; New York City Health Department

William Ward Darrow is a sociologist and professor emeritus of public health at Florida International University.

Before accepting a position at FIU in August 1994, Darrow served as Chief of the Behavioral and Prevention Research Branch, Division of STD/HIV Prevention, at the National Center for Prevention Services of the Centers for Disease Control and Prevention (CDC). Darrow has published over 100 scientific papers in professional journals, books, and research monographs.

His role in the discovery of the AIDS virus, HIV, was described in Randy Shilts' 1987 book And the Band Played On. Darrow also appeared in "The Zero Factor," part one of the four-part documentary, A Time of AIDS, which was shown on the Discovery Channel.

At the CDC, Darrow's work primarily focused on the social variables of sexually transmitted diseases, especially among homosexual men. In 1981, his focus shifted from condom use and diseases such as syphilis and gonorrhea to HIV/AIDS. Since then, Darrow has devoted his study and career to finding a cure for HIV/AIDS.

Darrow was honored with the 1992 Norwich Native Son Award.

He was played by Richard Masur in the HBO movie And the Band played On.
