= Willy Rozenbaum =

French physician (born 1945)

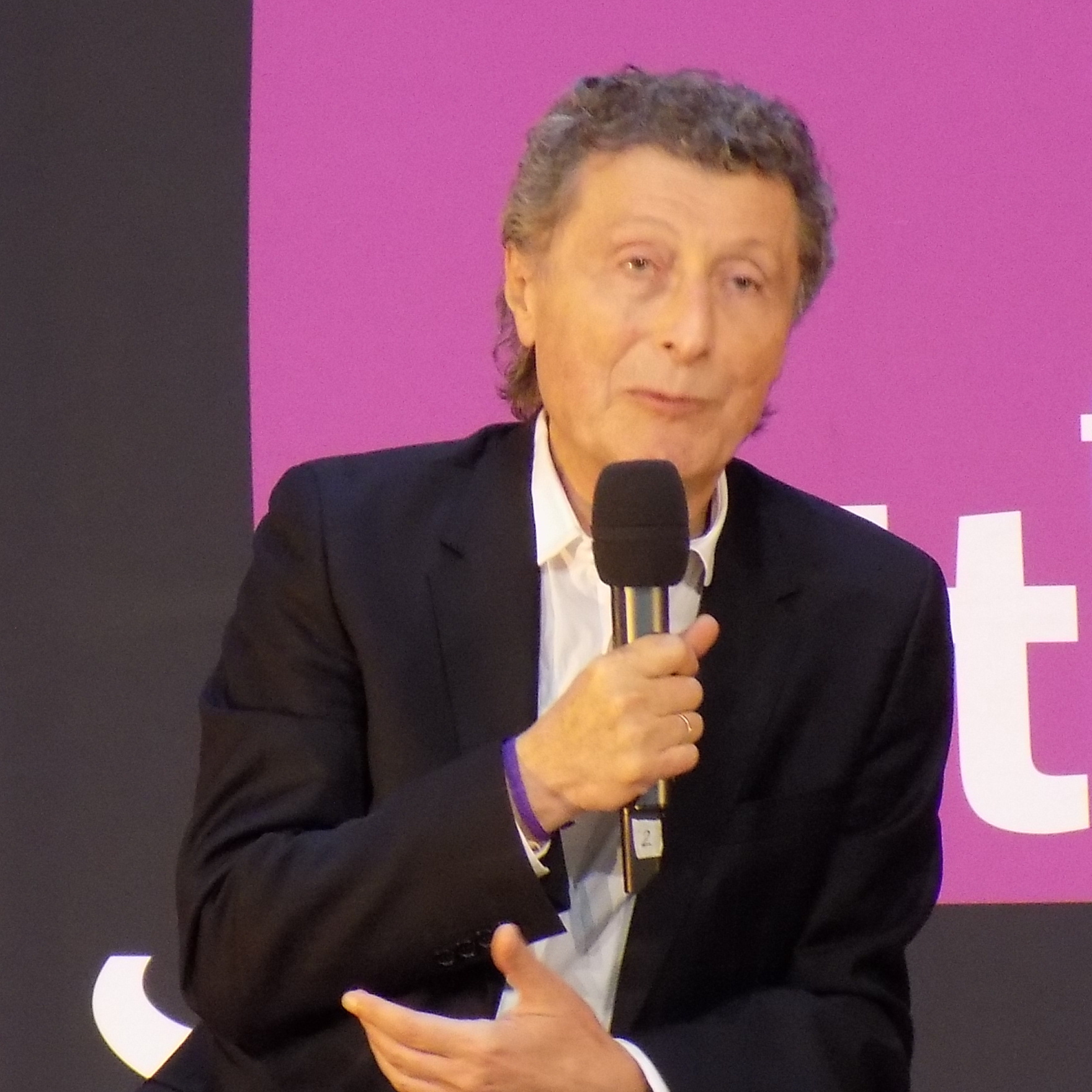
- Willy Rozenbaum (2015)
- Born: 25 June 1945 (age 81); Łódź, Poland
- Citizenship: French
- Known for: Co-discovery of the human immunodeficiency virus (HIV)
- Scientific career
- Fields: Medicine

Willy Rozenbaum (born 25 June 1945) is a Polish-born French physician.

A co-discoverer of the human immunodeficiency virus (HIV) with Jean-Claude Chermann of Luc Montagnier's team, he has since 19 November 2003 held the chair of France's "conseil national du SIDA" (National Council on AIDS) and before that had since 1989 practiced in the infectious and tropical diseases service at l'Hôpital Tenonfr and been professor of infectious and tropical diseases at l'Hôpital Saint-Antoine in Paris.

== Selected publications ==
- Rozenbaum W, Coulaud JP, Saimot AG, Klatzmann D, Mayaud C, Carette MF (1982-03-06). "Multiple opportunistic infection in a male homosexual in France". Lancet. 1 (8271): 572–3. doi:10.1016/S0140-6736(82)92087-6. PMID 6120427. S2CID 45884185.
- Chermann JC, Barré-Sinoussi F, Dauguet C, Brun-Vezinet F, Rouzioux C, Rozenbaum W, Montagnier L (1983). Isolation of a New Retrovirus in a Patient at Risk for Acquired Immunodeficiency Syndrome. Antibiotics and Chemotherapy. Vol. 32. pp. 48–53. doi:10.1159/000409704. ISBN 978-3-8055-3876-3. PMID 6205626.
- Didier Seux & Annie Kouchner (1984). Sida (in French). P.O.L.
- Luc Montagnier & Jean-Claude Gluckman (1994). Sida et infection par VIH (in French). Flammarion Médecine.
- La vie est une maladie mortelle sexuellement transmissible [Life is a sexually transmitted fatal illness] (in French). Stock. 1998.
- Jean-Daniel Baltassat (1999). La vie est une maladie mortelle sexuellement transmissible [Life is a sexually transmitted fatal illness] (in French). Livre de poche.
