= And the Band Played On =

1987 book by Randy Shilts

And the Band Played On: Politics, People and the AIDS Epidemic
- Cover of the first edition
- Author: Randy Shilts
- Language: English
- Subject: HIV/AIDS
- Publisher: St. Martin's Press
- Publication date: 1987
- Publication place: United States
- Media type: Print (Hardcover and Paperback)
- Pages: 630 pp
- ISBN: 0-312-00994-1
- OCLC: 16130075

And the Band Played On: Politics, People, and the AIDS Epidemic is a 1987 book by San Francisco Chronicle journalist Randy Shilts. The book chronicles the discovery and spread of the human immunodeficiency virus (HIV) and acquired immune deficiency syndrome (AIDS) with a special emphasis on government indifference and political infighting—specifically in the United States—to what was then perceived as a specifically gay disease. Shilts's premise is that AIDS was allowed to happen: while the disease is caused by a biological agent, incompetence and apathy toward those initially affected allowed its spread to become much worse.

The book is an extensive work of investigative journalism, written in the form of an encompassing time line; the events that shaped the epidemic are presented as sequential matter-of-fact summaries. Shilts describes the impact and the politics involved in battling the disease on particular individuals in the gay, medical, and political communities. Shilts begins his discussion in 1977 with the first confirmed case of AIDS, that of Grethe Rask, a Danish doctor working in Africa. He ends with the announcement by actor Rock Hudson in 1985 that he was dying of AIDS, when international attention on the disease exploded.

And the Band Played On was critically acclaimed and became a best-seller. Judith Eannarino of the Library Journal called it "one of the most important books of the year" upon its release. It made Shilts both a star and a pariah for his coverage of the disease and the bitter politics in the gay community. He described his motivation to undertake the writing of the book in an interview after its release, saying, "Any good reporter could have done this story, but I think the reason I did it, and no one else did, is because I am gay. It was happening to people I cared about and loved." The book was later adapted into an HBO film of the same name in 1993. Shilts tested positive for HIV while he was writing the book; he died of complications from AIDS in 1994.

== Background ==
To me, that summed up the whole problem of dealing with AIDS in the media. Obviously, the reason I covered AIDS from the start was that ... it was never something that happened to those other people.

— Randy Shilts, 1983

Shilts decided to write And the Band Played On after attending an awards ceremony in 1983 where he was to receive a commendation for his coverage on AIDS. As described in the book, television announcer Bill Kurtis gave the keynote address and told a joke: "What's the hardest part about having AIDS? Trying to convince your wife that you're Haitian." Shilts responded to the joke by saying that it "says everything about how the media had dealt with AIDS. Bill Kurtis felt that he could go in front of a journalists' group in San Francisco and make AIDS jokes. First of all, he could assume that nobody there would be gay and, if they were gay, they wouldn't talk about it and that nobody would take offense at that. To me, that summed up the whole problem of dealing with AIDS in the media. Obviously, the reason I covered AIDS from the start was that, to me, it was never something that happened to those other people." After publication of the book, Shilts explained his use of the title: "And the Band Played On is simply a snappier way of saying 'business as usual'. Everyone responded with an ordinary pace to an extraordinary situation."

== Summary ==
Shilts focuses on several organizations and communities that were either hit hardest by AIDS—and were given the task of finding the cause of the disease—or begging the government for money to fund research and provide social services to people who were dying. He often uses an omniscient point of view to portray individuals' thoughts and feelings.

=== Gay community ===
AIDS in the United States most notably struck gay communities in Los Angeles, New York City, and San Francisco. This was largely due to the general public's limited knowledge of the importance of protected ("safe") sex and IV drug using practices in preventing the transmission of diseases in the 1970s and 80s. Shilts's sources in the gay community tried to remember the last time everyone they knew was healthy, which was the United States Bicentennial celebration in 1976 when sailors came from all over the world to New York. Some of them carried sexually transmitted diseases and rare tropical fevers. A marked difference in these cities arose in two phases of consciousness in the gay community: "Before" in 1980, and "After" by 1985. "Before", according to Shilts, was characterized by a care-free innocence, preceding the period when gay men were aware of a deadly infectious disease. "After" signified the realization that gay men knew most or all of their friends were infected with AIDS, and the syndrome became pervasive throughout the media.

In San Francisco, particularly in the Castro District, gay community activists such as Bill Kraus and Cleve Jones found a new direction in gay rights when so many men came down with strange illnesses in 1980. The San Francisco Department of Public Health began tracing the disease, linked it to certain sexual practices, and made recommendations—stop having sex—to gay men to avoid getting sick, a directive that defied the chief reason why many gay men had migrated to the Castro, and for what gay rights activists in San Francisco had fought for years. Kraus and Jones often found themselves fighting a two-fronted battle: against city politicians who would rather not deal with a disease that affected gay men, who were seen as an undesirable population, and the gay men themselves, who refused to listen to doomsday projections and continued their unsafe behavior.

In New York City, men like Larry Kramer and Paul Popham, who had previously shown no desire for leadership, were forced by bureaucratic apathy into forming the Gay Men's Health Crisis to raise money for medical research and to provide social services for scores of gay men who began getting sick with opportunistic infections. Shilts describes the desperate actions of the group to get recognition by Mayor Ed Koch and assistance from the city's Public Health Department to provide social services and preventive education about AIDS and unsafe sex.

In these cities, however, the sizable gay communities in most instances were responsible for raising the most money for research, providing the money for and subsequently the social services for the dying, and educating themselves and other high-risk groups. Kramer would go on to form AIDS Coalition to Unleash Power (ACT UP), a political activist organization that forced government and media to pay attention to AIDS. Jones formed the NAMES Project that created the AIDS Memorial Quilt, the largest folk art display in the world.

=== Medical community ===
Doctors were the first to deal with the toll that AIDS would take in the United States. Some—like Marcus Conant, James Curran, Arye Rubinstein, Michael S. Gottlieb, and Mathilde Krim—would also realize their professional lives' courses in dealing with patient after patient who showed up in their offices with baffling illnesses, most notably lymphadenopathy, pneumocystis carinii pneumonia, Kaposi's sarcoma, toxoplasmosis, cytomegalovirus, cryptosporidiosis, and other opportunistic infections that caused death by a grisly combination of ailments overtaxing a compromised immune system. With no information on how the disease was spread, hospital staff were often reluctant to handle AIDS patients, and Shilts reported that some medical personnel refused to treat them at all.

Shilts praised the Public Health Department of San Francisco's handling of the new communicable disease as they tracked down people who were sick and linked them to other people who had symptoms, although some of them were living in different parts of the country. He criticized the New York City Public Health Department for doing very little, specifically when Public Health Director David Sencer refused to call AIDS an emergency and stated that the Public Health Department need not do anything because the gay community was handling it sufficiently.

Around the same time gay men were getting sick in the United States, doctors in Paris were receiving patients who were African or who had lived in Africa with the same symptoms as the Americans. Parisian researchers Jean-Claude Chermann, Françoise Barre, Luc Montagnier, and doctor Willy Rozenbaum began taking biopsies of HIV-infected lymph nodes and discovered a new retrovirus. As a scientific necessity to compare it to the American version of HIV, French doctors representing the Pasteur Institute sent a colleague to the National Cancer Institute, where Robert Gallo was also working on the virus. The colleague switched the samples, Shilts reported, because of a grudge he had against the Pasteur Institute. Instead of Gallo comparing his samples with the French samples, he found the very same retrovirus as the French sample, putting back any new results in AIDS research for at least a year.

Departmental ego and pride, according to Shilts, also confounded research as the Centers for Disease Control and the National Cancer Institutes battled over funding and who might get credit for medical discoveries that were to come from the isolation of HIV, blood tests to find HIV, or any possible vaccine. Once AIDS became known as a "gay disease" there was particular difficulty for many doctors in different specialties to get other medical professionals to acknowledge that AIDS could be transmitted to people who were not gay, such as infants born from drug-using mothers, children and adults who had hemophilia (and later, their wives), Haitians, and people who had received blood transfusions.

The discovery of HIV in the nation's blood supply and subsequent lack of response by blood bank leadership occurred as early as 1982, yet it was not until 1985, when HIV antibody testing was approved by the Food and Drug Administration (FDA), that blood bank industry leaders acknowledged that HIV could be transmitted through blood transfusions. Shilts's coverage revealed the feeling among blood bank industry leaders that screening donors for hepatitis alone might offend the donors, and that the cost of screening all the blood donations provided across the country every year was too high to be feasible.

=== Political and governmental agencies ===
The Centers for Disease Control (CDC), the agency responsible for tracking down and reporting all communicable diseases in the U.S., faced governmental apathy in the face of mounting crisis. Shilts reported how CDC epidemiologists forged ahead blindly after being denied funding for researching the disease repeatedly. Shilts expressed particular frustration describing instances of the CDC fighting with itself over how much time and attention was being paid to AIDS issues.

Although Reagan Administration officials like Health and Human Services Secretary Margaret Heckler and Assistant Secretary Edward Brandt spoke publicly about the epidemic, calling it in 1983 its "Number One Health Priority", no extra funding was given to the Centers for Disease Control or the National Institutes of Health for research. What the U.S. Congress pushed through was highly politicized and embattled, and a fraction of what was spent on similar public health problems.

Shilts made comparisons to the government's disparate reaction to the Chicago Tylenol murders, and the recent emergence of Legionnaires' disease in 1977. In October 1982, seven people died after ingesting cyanide-laced Tylenol capsules. The New York Times wrote a front-page story about the Tylenol scare every day in October, and produced 33 more stories about the issue after that. More than 100 law enforcement agents, and 1,100 Food and Drug Administration employees worked on the case. Johnson & Johnson disclosed they spent $100 million attempting to uncover who had tampered with the bottles. In October 1982, 634 people were reported having AIDS, and of those, 260 had died. The New York Times wrote three stories in 1981 and three more stories in 1982 about AIDS, none on the front page. The Tylenol Crisis was a criminal act of product-tampering; Legionnaires' disease was a public health emergency. Twenty-nine members of the American Legion died in 1976 at a convention in Philadelphia. The National Institutes of Health spent $34,841 per death of Legionnaire's Disease. In contrast, the NIH spent $3,225 in 1981 and about $8,991 in 1982 for each person who died of AIDS.

Shilts accused Ronald Reagan of neglecting to address AIDS to the American people until 1987—calling his behavior "ritualistic silence"—even after Reagan called friend Rock Hudson to tell him to get well. After Hudson's death and in the face of increasing public anxiety, Reagan directed Surgeon General C. Everett Koop to provide a report on the epidemic. Though Koop was a political conservative, his report was nevertheless clear about what causes AIDS and what people and the U.S. government should do to stop it, including sex and AIDS education provided for all people.

On a civic level, the closure of gay bathhouses in San Francisco became a bitter political fight in the gay community. Activists put pressure on the San Francisco Public Health director to educate people about how AIDS is transmitted, and demanded he close bathhouses as a matter of public health.

=== News media ===
Shilts was assigned to AIDS full-time at The San Francisco Chronicle in 1982. It was from this unique vantage point that he repeatedly criticized the U.S. news media for ignoring the medical crisis because it did not affect people who mattered; only gays and drug addicts. Shilts noted most newspapers would print stories about AIDS only when it affected heterosexuals, sometimes taking particular interest in stories about AIDS in prostitutes. AIDS was not reported in The Wall Street Journal until it involved heterosexuals. Many stories called AIDS a "gay plague" or "homosexual disease" in articles that pointed to it showing up in new populations, like hemophiliacs or people who had received blood transfusions. Shilts recounted the irony of a reporter commenting on how little was reported about the disease, then linking it once more to rarer instances of transmission to non-drug-using heterosexuals. On the other end of the extreme, a general phobia of AIDS was exacerbated by the news media who erroneously reported that AIDS could be contracted by household contact, without checking any facts in their stories, which prompted mass hysteria across the United States.

== Critical reception ==
The book became a commercial success, contrary to Shilts's own expectations. It remained on The New York Times Bestseller List for five weeks, was translated into seven languages, nominated for a National Book Award, and made Shilts an "AIDS celebrity". In Rolling Stone, Shilts is compared to great American writers whose careers were made by the circumstances surrounding them, such as Thomas Paine in the American Revolution, Edward R. Murrow during the Blitz, and David Halberstam during the Vietnam War. Writer Jon Katz explains, "No other mainstream journalist has sounded the alarm so frantically, caught the dimensions of the AIDS tragedy so poignantly or focused so much attention on government delay, the nitpickings of research funding and institutional intrigue". In the American Journal of Public Health, Howard Merkel characterizes And the Band Played On as the first volume of the historiography of AIDS. Because the content expanded into law and science, reviews were published not only in literary sources but legal and medical journals as well.

=== Literary ===
Literary reviews of the work were generally positive, with reviewers commenting on the "hypnotic" and "thriller-like" qualities of the book. Shilts's investigative and journalistic endeavors were praised, and reviewers seemed genuinely moved by the personal stories of the major players. (Note: Judith Eannarino noted, "Shilts has the ability to draw the reader hypnotically into the personal lives of his characters. That, and his monumental investigative effort, would have made this a best-selling novel—if the contents weren't so horribly true."(Eannarino, Judith (November 15, 1987). "And the Band Played On (book review)." Library Journal 112 (19) p. 71.) A reviewer with the feminist magazine Hera agreed, saying, "And the Band Played On reads like a mystery thriller. The fact that it is non-fiction adds to the intensity but also increases the rage the reader is left with."(Johnston, Peg. "And The Band Played On: Politics, People and the AIDS Epidemic; A Review of the book by Randy Shilts." Hera. March 31, 1989. 9 (2), p. 3.) Elena Brunet in the Los Angeles Times called it "An important, masterful piece of investigative reporting".(Brunet, Elena. "And the Band Played On: Politics, People and the AIDS Epidemic by Randy Shilts." Los Angeles Times: October 2, 1988. p. 14.) Anthony Clare in The Times stated in a review, "And the Band Played On is a formidable chronicle of wasted time, petty intrigue, bigoted posturing, blind faith and suffering", before warning the United Kingdom their response to AIDS was drawing too close a parallel to the United States'.(Clare, Anthony. "Chronicle of many deaths foretold: Review of 'And The Band Played On' by Randy Shilts", The Times, February 28, 1988.) Joan Breckenridge in The Globe and Mail gave the book high praise for "an excellent piece of both investigative and political journalism", and for the style of writing, although cautioning that at more than 600 pages casual readers might be overwhelmed.(Breckenridge, Joan. "The awful epidemic that was allowed to happen: And the Band Played On: Politics, People and the AIDS Epidemic." The Globe and Mail (Canada), December 5, 1987.) Nan Goldberg in The Boston Globe characterized it as a, "groundbreaking book on the history of the AIDS epidemic ... every element of a thriller." (Goldeberg, Nan. "Science Big Shot: Passion, Politics, and the Struggle for an AIDS Vaccine (book review)." The Boston Globe, January 6, 2002.)) And the Band Played On won the Stonewall Book Award for 1988. It earned the 10th spot on "100 Lesbian and Gay Books That Changed Our Lives", compiled by the Lambda Book Report. In 1999, The New York City Public Library topped its list of "21 New Classics for the 21st Century" with And the Band Played On. Two years after it was published however, Shilts remained "fundamentally disappointed" when a radical response to the AIDS crisis did not materialize, despite the reaction to his book.

In a 1988 book review, Jack Geiger of The New York Times commented that the detail in Shilts's work was too confusing, being told "in five simultaneous but disjointed chronologies, making them all less coherent", and notes that Shilts neglected to dedicate as much detail to black and Hispanic intravenous drug users, their partners and their children as to gay men. Geiger also expressed doubts that a swifter response by the government would have stemmed the spread of AIDS as quickly as Shilts was implying. Woodrow Myers from the Los Angeles Times was frustrated by Shilts not asking the right questions: "Shilts fails to probe the broader questions and stops where far too many of us stop: We don't ask why the Department of Defense and the entitlements like Social Security are getting all the money when the homosexuals and the IV drug abusers with AIDS and the multiple sclerosis patients are not." Boston's Gay Community News also criticized the book's implications that a diagnosis of HIV indicated that death was sure and imminent. Richard Rouilard, editor of The Advocate in 1992 criticized Shilts for being out of touch with the contemporary style of activism and its sexual overtones.

=== Science and law ===
Shilts's book has been used as a standard by the lay press when reviewing books chronicling subsequent medical crises including breast cancer, chronic fatigue syndrome, Agent Orange, and continued response to AIDS. However, the academic and scientific communities have been somewhat more critical. Howard Markel, in the American Journal of Public Health, notes Shilts's tendency to assign blame, writing "A requirement of the journalist, and certainly the historian, however, is to explain human society rather than to point fingers". Jon Katz in Rolling Stone refutes this by stating "[Shilts] fused strong belief with the gathering of factual information and the marshaling of arguments, the way the founders of the modern press did. In doing so, he has exposed the notion of objectivity as bankrupt, ineffective, even lethal".

Although Sandra Panem in the journal Science praised Shilts's efforts and the attention the book brought to AIDS, she criticized his simplistic interpretation of science and the ways research is fostered and accomplished in the U.S. Panem furthermore believes Shilts gives appropriate weight to the issue of homophobia hampering attention on the disease, but remarks that even if AIDS had struck a more socially acceptable group of people, similar delays and confusion would have slowed medical progress.

Wendy E. Parmet, a professor at Northeastern University Law School, highlights the greatest strengths of And the Band Played On to be "the pain and courage of individual confronted with AIDS" and how it "eloquently portrays the human side of the crisis" and believes the blame others criticized to be justified; but Parmet considers his technique of assigning an omniscient point of view a weakness, suggesting that it blurs the lines between fact and fiction. In Contemporary Sociology, Peter Manning and Terry Stein also call Shilts's narrative method into question, and ask why, for a syndrome that affects people beyond race, class, and sexual orientation, that Shilts focuses so narrowly on AIDS as it is related to homosexuality. The writers, however, were mostly impressed with the book, calling it an "informative, often brilliant, overview of the emergent meanings of the AIDS epidemic".

=== Gaëtan Dugas as "Patient Zero" ===
The book includes extensive discussion of Gaëtan Dugas, a Canadian flight attendant who died in 1984. Dugas was labeled Patient Zero of AIDS, because he was linked directly or indirectly with 40 of the first 248 reported cases of AIDS in the United States, and after he was told of his ability to infect others, defiantly continued to have unprotected sex. Many book reviews concentrated their material on Dugas, or led their assessment of the book with discussion of his behavior. Some reviewers interpreted Shilts's naming Dugas "Patient Zero" to mean that Dugas brought AIDS to North America; National Review called Dugas the "Columbus of AIDS" and in their review of And the Band Played On stated, "[Dugas] picked up the disease in Europe through sexual contact with Africans. Traveling on his airline-employee privileges, he spread it here from coast to coast." Shilts never stated this in the book, instead writing, "Whether Gaëtan Dugas actually was the person who brought AIDS to North America remains a question of debate and is ultimately unanswerable ... there's no doubt that Gaëtan played a key role in spreading the new virus from one end of the United States to the other." Time titled its review of And the Band Played On "The Appalling Saga of Patient Zero", erroneously restating the claim that Dugas had brought AIDS to the continent. Even a press release by St. Martin's Press made the connection between Dugas and the introduction of AIDS to the Western World in its title, but not its text.

When the book was released, Dugas's story became a controversial subject in the Canadian media. Shilts claimed that "the Canadian press went crazy over the story" and that "Canadians ... saw it as an offense to their nationhood." The original study identifying Dugas as the index case had been completed by William Darrow, but it was called into question by University of California San Francisco epidemiologist Andrew Moss. Moss wrote in a letter to the editor of The New York Review of Books, "There is very little evidence that Gaetan was 'patient zero' for the US or for California", while also stating that Shilts did not overstress Dugas's lack of personal responsibility.

Sandra Panem in Science uses Shilts's approach toward Dugas's behavior as an example of his "glib" treatment of the science involved in the epidemic. Author Douglas Crimp suggests that Shilts's representation of Dugas as "murderously irresponsible" is in actuality "Shilts's homophobic nightmare of himself", and that Dugas is offered as a "scapegoat for his heterosexual colleagues, in order to prove that [Shilts], like them, is horrified by such creatures."

Many years later, in the 2000s, it was shown, by tracing the roots of the virus, that it had spread from Africa to Haiti, and then to the U.S. in the mid-1960s, before Dugas would have been very sexually active, if at all, and before he was working as a flight attendant.

In 2016, a study of early AIDS cases demonstrated that Dugas could not have been "Patient Zero". Analysis of samples that Dugas had provided confirmed that the strain of HIV that he had only appeared in the mid 1970s - a younger strain than other American samples from the 1970s, and years after HIV was brought to the USA.

== After publication ==
While Shilts was writing the book he was tested for HIV but insisted his doctor not tell him the results until the book was finished so it would not affect his journalistic integrity and judgment. On the day he sent the final manuscript to the publisher, he learned he was HIV-positive. He also revealed that he received abuse from some in the gay community for the articles he wrote for the San Francisco Chronicle supporting the bathhouse closures, as well as for And the Band Played On, saying it was common for him to be spat upon in the Castro District. He was openly booed when he attended the premiere of The Times of Harvey Milk—based on his book The Mayor of Castro Street—at the Castro Theatre. Footage he had shot as a television reporter was included in the film, but during the construction of the documentary he was so controversial that the film's editors removed him from footage showing him with Milk. Following the publication of And the Band Played On, however, he was "worshipped" by many in the gay community for writing the book, but also seen as someone who pandered to publicity.

Shilts declared while promoting the book in Australia in 1988 that AIDS in the western world could be eradicated, and by 1994, "AIDS could be as manageable as diabetes". However, in reference to Africa, Shilts noted, "At this point it's inconceivable that there will be an AIDS-free world in Central Africa, as we're looking at a death rate on the scale of the Holocaust." Shilts gave an interview in 1991 where he noticed, "the stellar AIDS reporters in the early years ...the people who did the best job—and the reporters who wanted to cover AIDS but their male editors wouldn't let them—tended to be women", and made a connection that if more women were allowed to write about the epidemic, media coverage would have been vastly different.

Shilts died from complications of AIDS in 1994, age 42. Upon his death he was eulogized by Cleve Jones, who said "Randy's contribution was so crucial. He broke through society's denial and was absolutely critical to communicating the reality of AIDS." Larry Kramer said of him, "He single-handedly probably did more to educate the world about AIDS than any single person."

== Film ==
And the Band Played On was used as the basis for a 1993 Primetime Emmy Award-winning HBO television film of the same name. It was produced by Aaron Spelling, directed by Roger Spottiswoode, and starred Matthew Modine as epidemiologist Don Francis and Richard Masur as William Darrow at the Centers for Disease Control. Alan Alda portrayed controversial viral researcher Robert Gallo, and many other stars appeared in supporting and cameo roles, who agreed to appear in the film for union-scale pay. The film was released the same year as Philadelphia, and the play Angels in America: A Gay Fantasia on National Themes premiered, which prompted one reviewer to note it a triumph and a loss: 12 years after the epidemic had begun, such works of art were necessary still to draw attention to it. Reviews of the film were mixed, claiming that it was a noble try, but failed to be comprehensive enough to cover all the intricacies of the response to AIDS. However, And the Band Played On, along with other well-received films at the time, was noted for raising the standards of HBO-produced films.

== Translations ==
- German: ...und das Leben geht weiter, lit. 'Life Goes On'. Munich: Goldmann. 1988. ISBN 9783442426690.
- Spanish: En el filo de la duda, lit. 'On the Edge of Doubt'. Barcelona: Ediciones B. 1995. ISBN 9788440655172.
- Chinese: 世纪的哭泣：艾滋病的故事; pinyin: Shìjì de kūqì: Àizībìng de gùshì; lit. 'The Cry of the Century: The Story of AIDS'. Shanghai: Shanghai Translation Publishing House. 2019. ISBN 9787532781331.

== See also ==
- Timeline of early HIV/AIDS cases
- Zero Patience (1993 Canadian musical film)
- Sexual Ecology: AIDS and the Destiny of Gay Men (1997 non-fiction book)
- The Hot Zone: A Terrifying True Story (1994 best-selling non-fiction thriller)

== Bibliography ==
- Marcus, Eric (2002). Making Gay History. HarperCollins Publishers. ISBN 0-06-093391-7.
- Shilts, Randy (1987). And the Band Played On: Politics, People, and the AIDS Epidemic. St. Martin's Press. ISBN 0-312-24135-6.
- Stoner, Andrew E. (2019). The Journalist of Castro Street: The Life of Randy Shilts. University of Illinois Press. ISBN 9780252051326.
