= Marcus Conant =

American dermatologist (born 1936)

- Born: May 11, 1936 (age 90); Jacksonville, Florida
- Education: B.S. in Zoology from Duke University in 1957, Graduated from Duke Medical School in 1961
- Occupation: Chief Medical Officer at American Gene Technologies
- Known for: Identification of Kaposi's Sarcoma in AIDS patients
- Parent(s): Marcus Conant (Father), Annie Long Conant (Mother)

Marcus Augustine Conant (born May 11, 1936, in Jacksonville, Florida) is an American dermatologist and one of the first physicians to diagnose and treat Acquired Immune Deficiency Syndrome (AIDS) in 1981. He helped create one of the largest private AIDS clinics, was a founder of the San Francisco AIDS Foundation, and his work contributed to development of some of today's top HIV medications. He has written over 70 publications on the treatment of AIDS.

== Early life and education ==
Marcus Augustine Conant was born on May 11, 1936, in Jacksonville, Florida, to Marcus and Annie Long Conant. His father was in the military, leading to Marcus moving around a lot during his early years. When his father was deployed to Europe, Marcus and his family moved back to Jacksonville, Florida where he attended high school. Conant then attended Duke University where he graduated in 1957 with a B.S. in Zoology. In 1961, Conant graduated from Duke University College of Medicine with a specialty in Dermatology and interned at Duke University Medical Center. Conant served in the United States Air Force as a flight surgeon, on active duty from 1962 to 1964, and continuing as a reservist until 1967.

== UCSF and AIDS Work ==
In 1964, Conant joined the University of California San Francisco Medical Center as a dermatology resident. In 1967, he received his first academic appointment, as an instructor in clinical dermatology. As a resident at UCSF, Conant also volunteered at the Haight Ashbury Free Clinics, where he treated patients with genital herpes. Over the years, Conant rose up the academic ladder, and in 1984, he was appointed as clinical professor of dermatology.

While he was an associate professor at UCSF, Conant first identified Kaposi's Sarcoma and AIDS in patients, including early AIDS activist Bobbi Campbell. Conant founded the Kaposi's Sarcoma Research & Education Foundation in May 1982, which quickly became the first multidisciplinary AIDS clinic, and is now known today as the San Francisco AIDS Foundation. In 1987, Conant was appointed as co-chair of the California AIDS Leadership Committee, where he created California's initial policies in response to the AIDS epidemic.

He was the lead plaintiff in the Conant v. Walters trial, which lead to the judicial decision protecting the First Amendment right of physicians to recommend the use of medical marijuana to people living with HIV and AIDS, as well as the right to talk to their patients about anything as long as it was in the privacy of the examination room.

In 2010, Conant closed his practice in San Francisco, where he cared for over 8,000 patients with HIV/AIDS, and moved to New York, citing rising costs and difficulties in dealing with health insurance companies. He stated, "I'm sorry to have to leave my patients, and a lot of them are sorry I had to leave, but it's time. This is only symptomatic of a much bigger problem we have in this country with health care." He continued to consult with researchers on a reported association of a virus with chronic fatigue syndrome and autism.

== Later career ==
In August 2021, Conant was appointed as a special advisor to the CEO at American Gene Technologies (AGT), a biotechnology company in Rockville, Maryland who is focused on using gene therapy to find a cure for a variety of diseases, including HIV. Conant was eventually moved up to the role of Chief Medical Officer (CMO) at American Gene Technologies in October 2021, where he oversees the clinical trials for AGT's potential HIV cure therapy, AGT103-T.

== Recognitions ==
- UCSF names The Marcus Conant, MD, Endowment for HIV Dermatology and LGBTQ Health after Conant in 2023
- UC Berkeley's School of Public Health Public Health Hero Award (2012)
- UCSF Award for Public Service (1987)
- Conant was featured in the 1987 book And the Band Played On by Randy Shilts that displayed in start and spread of the AIDS epidemic and the government's indifference to the disease. He is also featured in the 1993 movie based on this book, where he is played by Richard Jenkins.

== See also ==
- HIV/AIDS
- San Francisco AIDS Foundation
- Dermatology
- Kaposi Sarcoma
