= Jean-Claude Chermann =

French virologist

Jean-Claude Chermann is a French virologist who managed the research team which, by 1983, under the administrative supervision of Luc Montagnier, had discovered the virus associated with AIDS. Whereas second author of this initial publication and obviously involved as team manager in this discovery, he had been omitted from the Nobel Prize attributed to its colleagues. In 2008, as chairman of the support committee for the attribution of the Nobel Prize in medicine to Jean-Claude Chermann, Bernard Le Grelle, a political consultant, campaigned for the official recognition of this oversight with the Nobel committee by bringing together more than 700 doctors, professors and scientists (including professor Robert Gallo). The virus was named lymphadenopathy-associated virus, or LAV. A year later, a team led by Robert Gallo of the United States confirmed the discovery of the virus, but renamed it human T-lymphotropic virus type III (HTLV-III).
