= Tax gene product =

A Tax Gene Product (Tax) is a nuclear protein that has a molecular weight of about 37,000 to 40,000 daltons.

== Tax gene ==
Tax is produced by members of the retroviral family primate T-lymphotropic virus, which are classified as Deltaretroviruses. This includes Human T-lymphotrophic viruses (HTLVs), bovine leukaemia virus (BLV) and simian T-lymphotropic viruses (STLVs). The tax protein produced from HTLV-1 and HTLV-2 have been most extensively studied. The gene for Tax is found within the pX region between the env gene and one of the long terminal repeats of the viral genome; which is where the name Tax comes from (transactivator from the X-gene region). Tax acts as a transactivator, causing the transcription (production of mRNA from genetic code) of viral proteins in the long terminal repeat that are essential for replication.

== Role in disease ==
HTLV-1 causes an aggressive form of leukaemia: adult T cell leukaemia (ATL), and Tax has largely been implicated in the oncogenic potential of this virus. In addition to Tax's ability to promote the transcription of viral proteins in the nucleus, it also regulates many human genes. It does this by modulating the activity of several signaling pathways such as: CREB/ATF, NF-κB, AP-1 and SRF. Tax modulates cellular processes by protein-protein interaction (binding with proteins), transcriptional activation (promoting the production of proteins) and transcriptional repression (inhibiting the production of proteins). Cellular processes that Tax dysregulates to produce cancerous cells include the cell cycle and the maintenance of genomic integrity. The cell cycle has four stages (G1, S, G2 and M) and Tax is known to accelerate the transition between G1 and S phase. Two DNA repair pathways (base excision repair and nucleotide excision repair) are affected by Tax, leading to mutations in DNA; a classical hallmark of cancer. Tax also causes aneuploidy (abnormal chromosome numbers), which is a possible cause of transformation (normal cells becoming cancer cells). Many proteins are involved in these processes, including cyclins and cell cycle checkpoint proteins (p53 and Rb). Interesting, HTLV-1 Tax viral gene is known to dampen innate antiviral signaling pathways to avoid host detection and elimination, through SOCS1 and Aryl Hydrocarbon Receptor Interacting Protein (AIP).

Although Tax from HTLV-1 and HTLV-2 can cause cells to become cancerous experimentally, Tax produced by HTLV-2 is less oncogenic than that from HTLV-1 and therefore is thought to be the reason that HTLV-2 is not associated with ATL.
