= Doris Anne Morgan =

American biomedical researcher

- Born: 1936 (age 89–90); Oceana, West Virginia, US
- Education: PhD. in Biochemical Genetics, West Virginia University
- Known for: Discovery of Interleukin-2
- Scientific career
- Fields: Virology, Immunology, Hematology
- Workplaces: National Institutes of Health, Drexel University College of Medicine
- Thesis: Transfer RNA Methylase Activity In Human Bone Marrow (1971)

Doris Anne Morgan (born 1936) is an American biomedical researcher. She is best known for her 1976 discovery of the first viable technique for culturing healthy human T cells, using what came to be known as Interleukin 2.

== Biography ==
=== Early life ===
Doris Morgan was born and raised in Oceana, West Virginia. After graduating from West Virginia University with a bachelor of science degree in medical technology in 1957, she worked as a medical technologist in the hematology departments of the George Washington University Hospital and Northwestern University Medical School, before returning to West Virginia University in 1967 to earn a PhD in biochemical genetics. Her post-doctoral fellowship was at the MD Anderson Cancer Center.

=== Discovery of Interleukin-2 ===
In December 1974, Morgan joined Robert Gallo's lab at the National Institutes of Health. Gallo had claimed to have successfully isolated the first cancer-causing human retrovirus, HL23V. This turned out not to be the case, and Morgan was assigned to find a way to get Gallo's intended methodology to succeed.

Unable to get results using Gallo's methods, Morgan instead began cultivating a different cell-line derived from the white blood cells of a leukemia patient. Gallo was frustrated and dismissive, believing her results to be a meaningless rediscovery of a known cell, the B cell. However, other researchers in the lab, including her eventual collaborator Francis Ruscetti, saw promise in her work and encouraged her to send samples to other laboratories, helping her to disprove the B cell hypothesis. She and Ruscetti realized that they had in fact cultured non-cancerous T cells, something generally believed impossible.

=== Publication and Termination ===
Morgan published her results in two papers co-authored with Ruscetti and Gallo. Gallo, however, reportedly remained hostile, which caused her to be marginalized within the lab. She spent several months growing large quantities of T cells, to help with other scientists' research, before being abruptly fired in January 1978. Officially, only budgetary concerns were given as the cause of termination. However, both Ruscetti and Morgan told journalists that this was a decision made personally by Gallo because he disliked Morgan's idiosyncratic approach. Gallo would, much later, acknowledge that her idiosyncrasies had likely been essential to the work's success.

=== Post-discovery career ===
Morgan spent much of her career as a research faculty member at the Hahnemann University School of Medicine, which became the Drexel University College of Medicine in 2002. Her work continued to focus on laboratory techniques for cultivating specific types of blood, immune, and retroviral cells. Some of her last published work, in 2009, involved the cultivation and analysis of sea turtle blood.

== Legacy ==
Although she has received little recognition, Morgan's discovery of Interleukin-2 was foundational to subsequent immunology research. Most immediately, her technique enabled the discoveries of HTLV-1 by her former team and HIV by French researchers Françoise Barré-Sinoussi and Luc Montagnier.

The cultivation of T cells remains essential to medical research. Interleukin-2 has also been used directly as a therapy of certain melanomas and other cancers.

Morgan's later work produced cell lines, such as HU-01 and HU-03, that have also been useful to a wide range of projects.

== Sample published works ==
- Morgan, D. A., Ruscetti, F. W., & Gallo, R. C. (1976). Selective in vitro growth of T lymphocytes from normal human bone marrows. Science, 193(4257), 1007–1008.
- Zagury, D., Morgan, D.A., et al. (1983). Human normal CTL clones: Generation and properties. International Journal of Cancer, 31(4), 427-432.
- Morgan DA, Class R, Violetta G, Soslau G. (2009). Cytokine mediated proliferation of cultured sea turtle blood cells: morphologic and functional comparison to human blood cells. doi: 10.1016/j.tice.2008.12.004
