= III International AIDS Conference, 1987 =

Conference

The III International AIDS Conference was held in Washington, D.C. in 1987.

== Conference highlights ==
6000 researchers attended and presented 220 science reports. 900 journalists attended.

Vice President George H. W. Bush spoke at the conference on the topic of confidentiality of HIV testing, for which the government was developing a policy.

Robert Gallo announced the discovery of HIV-2.

The conference marked an international acceptance in recognizing AIDS. Between 1986-7, the number of countries which reported AIDS statistics to the WHO doubled. The conference brought recognition to many countries' national HIV education programs. There was no single research breakthrough at the conference which emerged as particularly newsworthy in the mass media.
