= Human T-lymphotropic virus 2 =

Species of virus

- Specialty: Infectious diseases
- Symptoms: Mild cognitive Impairment, Mycosis fungoides
- Duration: Chronic, incurable
- Causes: HTLV-2
- Risk factors: Unsafe sex, haemophiliacs
- Diagnostic method: Blood test
- Differential diagnosis: HIV/AIDS, Lymphoma, HTLV-1
- Prevention: Practicing safe-sex, use of clean needles, screening blood transfusions, Avoiding breastfeeding.
- Medication: Antiretrovirals, chemotherapy
- Prognosis: 95% present with no symptoms, generally good
- Frequency: 15-20 million people worldwide

Human T-lymphotropic virus 2

Virus classification
- (unranked): Virus
- Realm: Riboviria
- Kingdom: Pararnavirae
- Phylum: Artverviricota
- Class: Revtraviricetes
- Order: Ortervirales
- Family: Retroviridae
- Genus: Deltaretrovirus
- Species: Deltaretrovirus priTlym2

A virus closely related to HTLV-I, human T-lymphotropic virus 2 (HTLV-II or HTLV-2) shares approximately 70% genomic homology (structural similarity) with HTLV-I. It was discovered by Robert Gallo and colleagues.

HTLV-2 is prevalent in Africa and among Indigenous peoples in Central and South America, as well as among drug users in Europe and North America. It can be passed down from mother to child through breast milk, and through blood transfusions, sexual contact, and use of intravenous drug usage.

HTLV-II entry in target cells is mediated by the glucose transporter GLUT1.

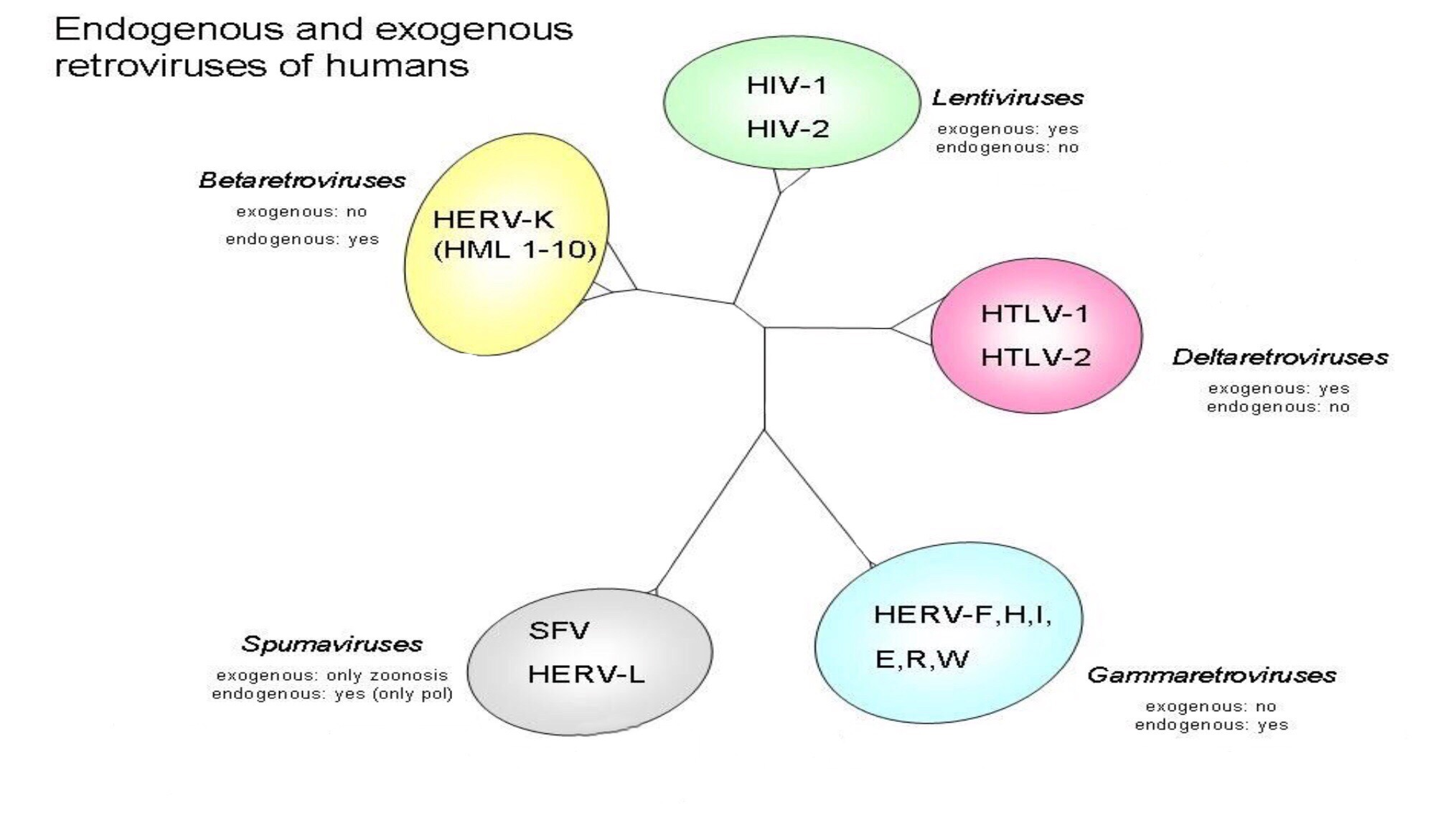
A phylogeny of the subtypes of HTLV and their relationships between endogenous and exogenous retroviruses in the human genome. HERV = human endogenous retrovirus, SFV = simian foamy virus

== Virology ==
HTLV-1 and HTLV-2 share broad similarities in their overall genetic organization and expression pattern, but they differ substantially in their pathogenic properties. The virus utilizes the GLUT-1 and NRP1 cellular receptors for their entry, although HTLV-1, but not HTLV-2, is dependent on heparan sulfate proteoglycans. Cell-to-cell transmission is essential for the virus replication and occurs through the formation of a virological synapse. The family of Human T-lymphotropic virus (Figure 2) can be further categorized into four subtypes. The figure also divides the retroviruses into exogenous and endogenous. Retroviruses can exist in two different forms: endogenous which consists of normal genetic components and exogenous which are horizontally transferred genetic components that are usually infectious agents that cause disease i.e. HIV. In (Figure 3) open reading frames (ORF) are shown which can if translated predict which genes will be present and this can help to better understand human retroviruses. Of the four subtypes, HTLV-2 may be linked to Cutaneous T-cell lymphoma (CTCL). In one study involving cultured lymphocytes from patients with mycosis fungoides (Figure 1), PCR amplification showed gene sequences of HTLV-II. This finding may suggest a possible correlation with HTLV-2 and CTCL. Further research and studies must be conducted to show a positive relationship.

== Transmission ==
Perinatal transmission and breastfeeding and through blood transfusion, sexual contact, and use of intravenous drug usage.

=== Epidemiology ===
HTLV-1 and HTLV-2 are both involved in actively spreading epidemics, affecting 15-20 million people worldwide. ^{[4]} In the United States, the overall prevalence is 22 per 100,000 population, with HTLV-2 more common than HTLV-1. Data collection performed from 2000 to 2009 among US blood donors has shown a general decline since the 1990s.

== Clinical significance ==
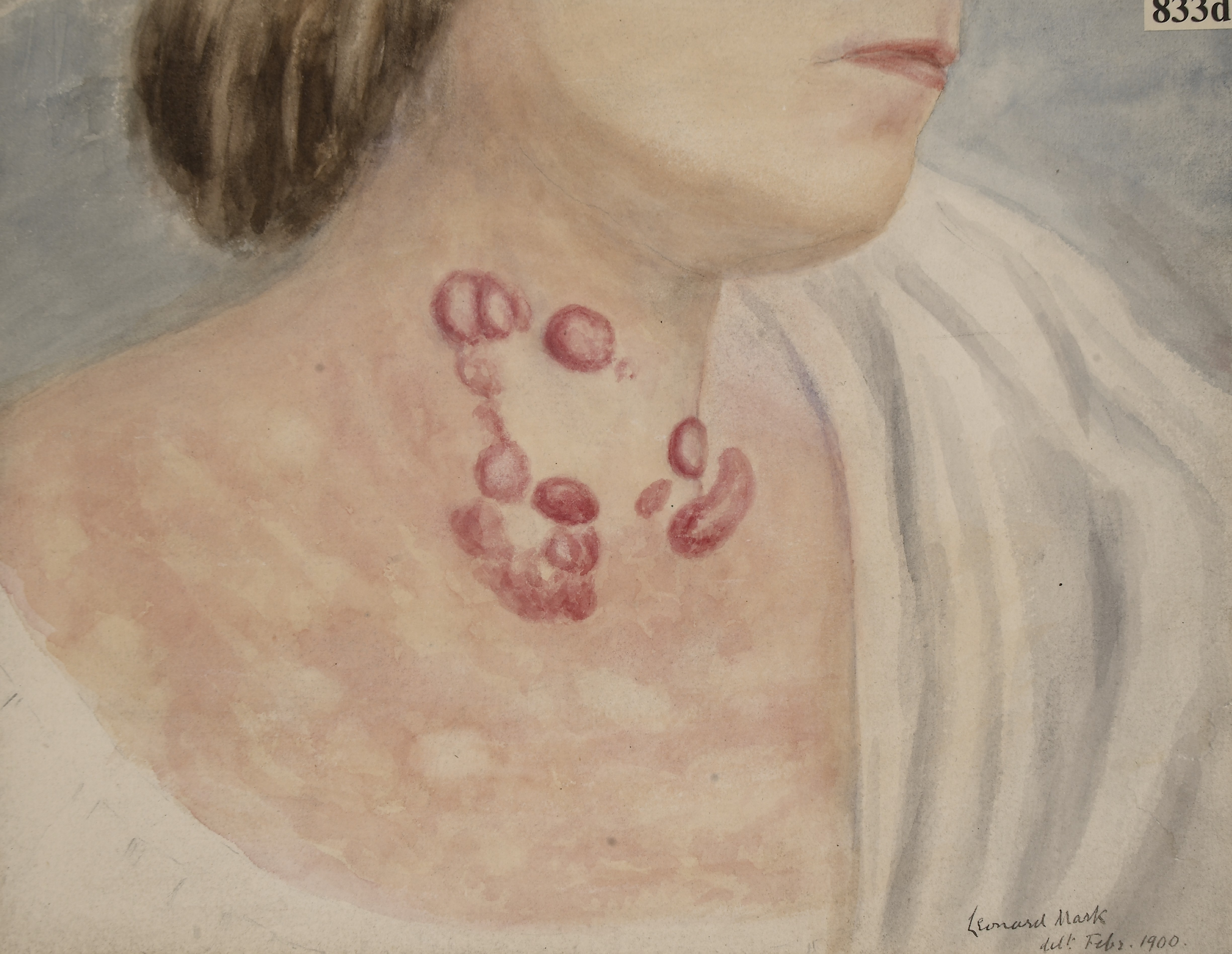
Figure 1. Mycosis fungoides, a skin disease showing nodules and plaques composed of lymphocytes spread across the skin, has been associated with HTLV-II infection

Infection with HTLV-2 generally causes no signs or symptoms and the virus has not been definitively linked with any specific health problems, but has been associated with several cases of myelopathy/tropical spastic paraparesis (HAM/TSP)-like neurological disease. It is suspected that some affected people may later develop neurological problems such as:

- Sensory neuropathies (conditions that affect the nerves that provide feeling)
- Gait abnormalities
- Bladder dysfunction
- Mild cognitive impairment
- Motor abnormalities (loss of or limited muscle control or movement, or limited mobility)
- Erectile dysfunction
- Mycosis fungoides

Although evidence is limited, there may also be a link between HTLV-2 and chronic lung infections (i.e. pneumonia and bronchitis), asthma and dermatitis. An impact on platelet count has been observed.

In the 1980s, HTLV-2 was identified in a patient with an unidentified T cell lymphoproliferative disease that was described as having characteristics similar to the B cell disorder, hairy cell leukemia. HTLV-2 was identified in a second patient with a T cell lymphoproliferative disease; this patient later developed hairy cell leukemia, but HTLV-2 was not found in the hairy cell clones.

== Treatment ==
There are few treatments including chemotherapy and antiretrovirals that can slow the viral load but no cure or definitive treatment exists for HTLV-2.

=== Diagnosis ===
Human T- leukemia, type 2 (HTLV-2) is usually diagnosed based on blood tests that detect the virus. However, HTLV-2 is often never suspected or diagnosed since most people never develop any signs or symptoms of the infection. Diagnosis may occur during blood donation, testing performed due to an infection, or a work-up for an HTLV-2-associated medical problems.

=== Prevention ===
Due to there being no cure for HTLV II the prevention is focused on early detection and preventing the spread of HTLV-2 to others. blood donors, promoting safe sex, and discouraging needle sharing can decrease the number of new infections. Mother-to-child transmission can be reduced by screening pregnant women so infected mothers can avoid breastfeeding.

=== Prognosis ===
The long-term outlook for most people infected with HTLV-2 is good. Infection with HTLV-2 is lifelong, but 95% of affected people have no signs or symptoms of the condition. Although, HTLV-2-related health problems tend to be significantly milder than those associated with HTLV1.
