= HL23V =

HL23V was reputedly a type C RNA tumor virus first isolated in 1975 from cultured human acute myelogenous leukaemia peripheral blood leukocytes in the laboratory of Robert Gallo, which would have been the first cancer-causing retrovirus isolated from human sera. It was later shown to be a laboratory contaminant of three monkey viruses. The journal Nature, which had published the original research, later retracted the article. Investigative journalist John Crewdson, writing in 2003, described how Gallo pretended mysterious laboratory accidents such as the unplugging of a laboratory freezer to excuse his failure to share samples of "HL23V" to researchers. As "HL23V" would have been the first human retrovirus discovered, bringing attention to Gallo and thus scientific prizes, observers noted that "23" was the number of Robert Gallo's birthday.

Later in 1986, Max Essex of Harvard would announce the "discovery" of "HTLV-IV" in Senegalese women, supposedly a type C relative of HIV (then called HTLV-III) thought to be HIV-2. This similarly was determined to be a contaminant.

== See also ==
- Simian sarcoma associated virus (SSAV or SSAV-1), one of two associated viruses comprising HL23V
- HTLV-1, the actual first human pathogenic retrovirus discovered in 1981
