= Mir-873 microRNA precursor family =

mir-873

Identifiers
- Symbol: mir-873
- Rfam: RF00910
- miRBase family: MIPF0000390

Other data
- RNA type: microRNA
- Domain: Eukaryota;
- PDB structures: PDBe

In molecular biology mir-873 microRNA is a short RNA molecule. MicroRNAs function to regulate the expression levels of other genes by several mechanisms.

== Dysmaculinisation in males ==
Significant miR-873 reductions have been observed in the brains of dysmasculinised second generation males following the introduction of prenatal stress factors. Sexual dimorphisms in the brain are altered and there is female-like expression of key neurodevelopment genes. The common target gene for miR-873, β-glycan, has increased expression. It is thought that miR-873, along with other miRNAs, may play a role in organisation of the sexually dimorphic brain due to a marked response to organisational testosterone.

== Chromatin remodelling ==
miR-873 is associated with translational regulation of factors involved in chromatin remodelling, and is downregulated by the human T-cell leukaemia virus type 1 (HTLV-1) transactivating protein, Tax. Specifically, it has been found to directly target the chromatin remodelling factors p300 and p/CAF.

== See also ==
- MicroRNA
