= HTLV-III =

HTLV-3 is:

- a former name for the human immunodeficiency virus (now known as HIV).
- now the name of a different virus, the human T-lymphotrophic virus type 3
