= Paolo Lusso =

Italian academic

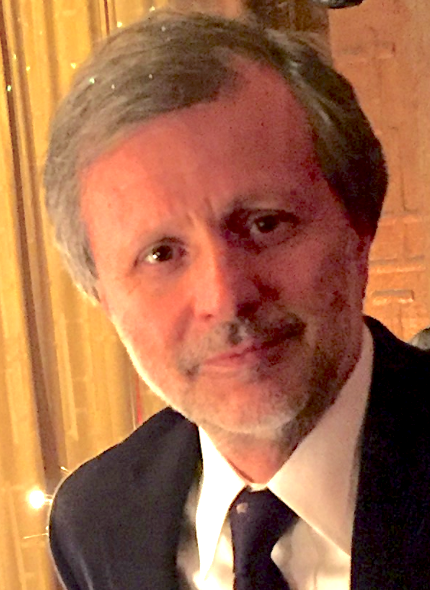
- Portrait of Paolo Lusso
- Born: Torino, Italy
- Citizenship: Italian, US
- Education: University of Torino, Italy (M.D.)
- Spouse(s): Patrizia Farci, M.D.
- Children: Emanuele Lusso
- Scientific career
- Fields: Virology, Immunology, Infectious Diseases
- Workplaces: National Cancer Institute (NCI), Bethesda; San Raffaele Scientific Institute, Milan; University of Cagliari; National Institute of Allergy and Infectious Diseases (NIAID), Bethesda

Paolo Lusso is an Italian doctor and scientist who specializes in virology and immunology. He is the Chief of the Viral Pathogenesis Section at the Laboratory of Immunoregulation and Infectious Diseases of the National Institute of Allergy and Infectious Diseases (NIAID) in Bethesda, Maryland, US. He is best known for his 1995 discovery of three chemokines (chemotactic cytokines) that naturally block HIV-1, RANTES, MIP-1α and MIP-1β, which inaugurated the field of HIV and chemokines.

== Life and career ==
Paolo Lusso was born and raised in Turin, Italy, and earned his M.D. summa cum laude from the University of Turin in 1981. He later earned a Ph.D. in Oncology from the Ministry of University and Research (MUR), Rome, Italy, and was certified in Internal Medicine and Infectious Diseases. In 1986, he joined the Laboratory of Tumor Cell Biology led by American biomedical researcher Robert Gallo at the National Cancer Institute in Bethesda, Maryland (USA). He returned to Italy in 1994 to become the Chief of the Laboratory of Human Virology at the San Raffaele Scientific Institute in Milan. He also became associate professor of Infectious Diseases and director of the post-graduate school of Infectious Diseases first at the University of Bologna and later at the University of Cagliari. In 2006, he rejoined the National Institutes of Health, where he became chief of the Viral Pathogenesis Section in the Laboratory of Immunoregulation at the National Institute of Allergy and Infectious Diseases. He is the executive editor of Current HIV Research, an elected member of the European Molecular Biology Organization (EMBO) and an elected Fellow of the American Academy of Microbiology (AAM). He is married with Patrizia Farci, M.D. They have one son, Emanuele.

== Research ==
Lusso's major scientific accomplishments include the establishment of the first connection between the fields of HIV-1 and the chemokine system with the discovery of three chemokines that naturally block HIV-1 (i.e., RANTES, MIP-1α and MIP-1β; cited nearly 4,000 times according to Google Scholar), the elucidation of multiple mechanisms of interaction between the CD4^{+} T-lymphotropic human herpesvirus HHV-6 and HIV-1, the in-vitro and in-vivo characterization of chemokine receptor usage by HIV-1, the identification of the cellular receptors for HHV-6 and HHV-7, the discovery of a second receptor (CD4)-binding site for HIV-1, and the development of a protective mRNA vaccine against HIV-1 (in collaboration with Moderna; featured on the cover page of the journal Nature Medicine). The HIV-1 vaccine designed by Lusso utilizes mRNA to instruct the body to produce virus-like particles (VLPs), which closely mimic real-life HIV-1 virions (albeit lacking infectivity) and, thereby, induce more effective immune responses. It has demonstrated protective efficacy in rhesus macaques.

== Awards and recognitions ==
- "Breakthrough of the Year" (for the discovery of HIV-suppressive chemokines), Science, Washington, D.C. (USA), 1996.
- Elected member of the European Molecular Biology Organization (EMBO), 2004.
- Norman P. Salzman Mentorship Award in Basic and Clinical Virology, 2015.
- Elected Fellow of the American Academy of Microbiology (AAM), 2018.
- Career Award for Outstanding Contributions to the Field of Virology, Italian Society for Virology (SIV-ISV), 2025.
