= David Katzenstein =

American virologist and AIDS researcher (1952–2021)

David Katzenstein (January 3, 1952 – January 25, 2021) was an American virologist and prominent AIDS researcher. He was professor emeritus of infectious diseases and global health at Stanford University.

== Early life and education ==
Katzenstein was born in Hartford, Connecticut. His father, Henry Katzenstein was a physicist, and his mother, Constance Allenberg Katzenstein, was a clinical psychologist. He attended the University of California, San Diego where he earned a BA in biology in 1973. He was an intern in internal medicine at the University of New Mexico, working with the indigenous tribes found there. He also received his MD from UCSD in 1977.

== Teaching ==
After completing his residency in San Diego in 1980, he taught at the University of California, Davis, and until 1986 at the University of Minnesota.

== Research ==
He developed a relationship with the medical microbiology department at the University of Zimbabwe's medical school while he was at the University of California. As a result of this relationship he became "one of the first U.S.-based H.I.V. researchers to commit to working in this region of the world." Katzenstein worked as a senior research fellow at the Food and Drug Administration's Center for Biologics Evaluation and Research from 1987 until 1989, where he worked under Anthony Fauci. At that time he became a faculty member at Stanford University as a clinical assistant professor of infectious diseases. He became the associate medical director of the AIDS Clinical Trial Unit at Stanford, which conducted clinical trials and research on antiretroviral drugs which helped people with HIV live longer.

== Director of the Biomedical Research and Training Institute ==
He joined the Biomedical Research and Training Institute in Harare in 2016, after retiring from his position at Stanford and became its director. There he trained clinical researchers, and brought modern monitoring and diagnostic systems to community health centers. He also published research papers.

== Memberships ==
He served on the editorial board of Current HIV Research. He was a member of the American Society for Microbiology, the Infectious Disease Society of America, the Society for General Microbiology, the International AIDS Society, the American Federation for Clinical Research and the Southern Africa Treat Research Network.

== Personal life ==
In 2009, Katzenstein was in a hiking accident in Big Sur, California. He fell 90 feet into a ravine sustaining a compound leg fracture needing 17 separate surgeries. The bone became infected, and he never fully recovered, at first using a wheelchair but eventually using a cane. Katzenstein was married to Sharon Mayes, who died in 2007.

== Death ==
Katzenstein died in Harare, Zimbabwe, of COVID-19 during the COVID-19 pandemic in Zimbabwe, at the age of 69, 22 days after his birthday. He was survived by a brother and two sisters; a step-daughter, and her sons.
