= Gibbon ape leukemia virus =

Virus classification
- (unranked): Virus
- Realm: Riboviria
- Kingdom: Pararnavirae
- Phylum: Artverviricota
- Class: Revtraviricetes
- Order: Ortervirales
- Family: Retroviridae
- Genus: Gammaretrovirus
- Species: Gammaretrovirus gibleu

Synonyms
- Gibbon sarcoma and leukemia virus

Species of virus

Gibbon-ape leukemia virus (GaLV) is an oncogenic, type C retrovirus that has been isolated from primate neoplasms, including the white-handed gibbon and woolly monkey. The virus was identified as the etiological agent of hematopoietic neoplasms, leukemias, and immune deficiencies within gibbons in 1971, during the epidemic of the late 1960s and early 1970s. Epidemiological research into the origins of GaLV has developed two hypotheses for the virus' emergence. These include cross-species transmission of the retrovirus present within a species of East Asian rodent or bat, and the inoculation or blood transfusion of a MbRV-related virus into captured gibbons populations housed at medical research institutions. The virus was subsequently identified in captive gibbon populations in Thailand, the US and Bermuda.

GaLV is transmitted horizontally by contact with excretory products of infected gibbons. However, it is also hypothesised to be vertically transmitted via parent-progeny transmission. Phylogenetic analysis have revealed 7 strains of GaLV; GaLV-SF, GaLV-SEATO, GaLV-BR, GALV-X, GaLV-Mar, GaLV-H and SSV, which have emerged as a result of selection pressures from the host immune system. Recently, full genome sequences of these strains have been made available which broadens the possibilities for GaLV's utility as a viral vector in gene transfer.

== Epizootiology ==
=== History ===
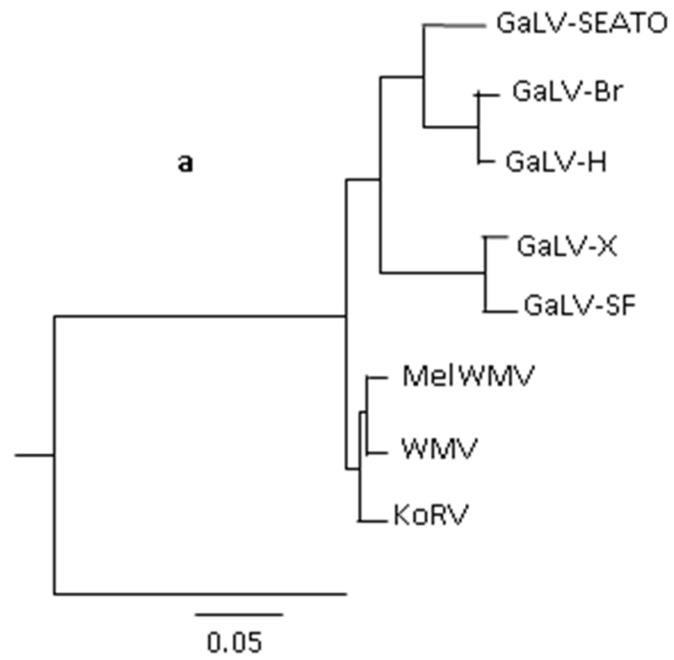
GaLV Phylogenetic trees derived from genome sequences of GaLV strains; GaLV-SEATO, GaLV-Br, GaLV-H, GaLV-X and GaLV-SF.

Phylogenies of Gammaretrovirus
- Mottaghinia et al. (2024), focusing on the clade containing G. gibleu and G. koa

Cases of malignant lymphomas and leukemias were not described in gibbons until the 1960s, when several cases of haematopoietic neoplasia were reported in a single colony of white-handed gibbons housed at the SEATO research facility in Bangkok, Thailand. In 1971, phylogenetic analysis of the Leukemia-inducing retrovirus, lead to the identification of GaLV-SEATO, published within De Paoli et al. (1971). Following this discovery, five other strains of GaLV was identified from animals whose associated neoplastic syndromes were exclusively recorded in captive gibbon populations, which include:

- GaLV-SF: identified from a gibbon lymphosarcoma in San Francisco and within captured gibbons populations at the University of California San Francisco Medical Center and the University of California. (Kawakami et al. and Snyder et al., 1973)
- GALV‐X: detected in cell culture from a human T-cell line infected with HIV-1 in Louvain, Belgium and at the National Cancer Institute in Maryland, US.
- GALV‐H: identified from a gibbon with lymphocytic leukemias from a colony of free-ranging gibbons at the Hall's Island, Bermuda.
- GALV‐Br: Identified in frozen brain samples of non-leukemic gibbons at the Gulf South Research Institute in Louisiana. (Gallo et al., 1978)
- GaLV-Mar: detected in cell culture (in vitro) derived from marmoset cells.
- Simian sarcoma (SSV): a defective GALV recombinant, derived from a single isolate of fibrosarcoma in a Woolly Monkey that was exposed to a GALV-infected captive gibbon. For viral replication to occur within the host, simian sarcoma-associated virus (SSAV) must also be present. SSAV is also called WMV, the woolly monkey virus, though detection in the woolly monkey Legothrix lagothrica is likely due to a case of gibbon-to-monkey transmission. The ICTV treats SSV as a separate species, woolly monkey sarcoma virus.

These strains exhibit high genetic similarity, demonstrated through DNA sequencing which reveals approx. 90% sequence identity and more than 93% amino acid genome identity between strains of GaLV. Differences between these strains occurs in the env gene, with divergence ranging from 85% to 99%.

=== Origins ===
The discovery of a contagious oncogenic gammaretrovirus in sub-human primates stimulated a great deal of research into the pathogenesis of GaLV and its origins including the virus' intermediate host, which is currently disputed. Virologist initially suggested that GaLV was related to murine leukaemia virus (MLV) detected in Southeast Asian rodents. The endogenous retroviruses with similar homology are; McERV, detected within Mus caroli, and Mus dunni endogenous virus (MDEV) isolated from the earth-coloured mouse (Lieber et al. 1975, Callahan et al. 1979). Furthermore, this hypothesis was based on results derived from low resolution serological and DNA homology methods. Thus, present phylogenetic analysis of proviral sequences of GALV‐SEATO and MLV shows a 68–69% similarity for pol and 55% similarity for env, thus indicating the limited sequence similarity. Therefore, there are no published proviral sequences from rodent hosts which share a sufficiently high degree of sequence identity to GALV to confirm an intermediate rodent host as the precursor for GaLV.

An alternative hypothesis is based on the high sequence similarity of GaLV-SEATO and the Melomys burtoni retrovirus (MbRV), isolated from a species of rodent from Papua New Guinea. Immunological analysis highlights that MbRV shares 93% sequence homology with GaLV-SEATO which is significantly higher than McERV and MDEV. However, due to the lack of geographic overlap of grassland melomys in PNG and Thailand, MbRV was initially considered ill-suited as the intermediate host of GaLV. However, in 2016 the Mammal Review published "Is gibbon ape leukaemia virus still a threat?" which offered a valid hypothesis for the spread of MbRV from PNG to Thailand by divulging SEATO facility reports and reviewing geographical movement of gibbons during the 1960s and 1970's. The SEATO facility report demonstrated that gibbons were frequently inoculated with biomaterial from humans, Southeast Asian rodents and other gibbons, for pathogenetic study of human diseases including malaria and dengue fever. It is therefore proposed that blood and tissue samples used at SEATO were contaminated with MbRV-related virus and later introduced into Gibbon test subjects via blood transfusion or inoculation, thereby resulting in the development of GaLV within two gibbons (S-76 and S-77).

The last hypothesis is based on the sequence similarity of GaLV and retroviruses present within Southeast Asian bat species. Mobile bat species are potential intermediate hosts of GALV as they can disperse rapidly over large geographical areas and have also been linked to several zoonotic diseases.

In any case, an Australo-Papuan origin is likely, as the local fauna harbors several GaLV-like viruses infecting a wide range of monkeys, apes, bats, rodents, and koalas. Three of these viruses (KoRV, MelWMV-NG, cMWMV) are vertically transmitted.

=== Replication cycle ===
GaLV belongs to the retrovirus family which utilises an enzyme called reverse transcriptase in viral replication. Retroviruses have single stranded genomes (ssRNA) which undergoes reverse transcription to form double-stranded DNA (dsNDA) prior to proviral integration into the genome of the host cell. The GaLV replication cycle proceeds as follows:

1. Binding: The first step of GaLV retroviral replication is the adsorption of adsorbate particles on the surface of human cells using receptor molecules SLC20A1 (GLVR-1, PIT-1) and SLC20A2 (GLVR-2, PIT-2). Both molecules are cellular proteins (phosphate transporters).
2. Entry into host cell: Then GaLV particles use these cell-surface proteins on the cell membrane, as specific receptors to enter their host cells.
3. Reverse transcription: The viral core then enters the cytoplasm of the target cell where the enzyme, reverse transcriptase, generates a complementary DNA strand from 3' to 5'.
4. Nuclear entry: The proviral integration of GaLV into the host genome requires entry into the nucleus of the target cell. However, GaLV is incapable of infecting non-dividing cells and therefore relies on the breakdown of the nuclear membrane during mitosis cell division for nuclear entry.
5. Replication: Once the proviral DNA enters the nucleus of the host cell, replication occurs via polypeptide synthesis and becomes integrated into the host genome.

=== Viral resistance ===
Research published within the Retroviruses and Insights into Cancer Journal, highlights the potential of viral resistance within gibbon-apes, due to the partial proviral transcription of an intact envelope gene. The expression of the GaLV envelope gene was exhibited within an asymptomatic gibbon despite long term exposure to another highly viremic gibbon. Therefore, the expression of the GaLV envelope in the absence of replication-competent GaLV may have rendered the animal resistant to GaLV infection. Furthermore, antibodies against the retrovirus was identified in gibbons without evidence of disease which suggests a natural immunological resistance to GaLV.

=== Transmission ===
GaLV is an exogenous virus that is horizontally transmitted via contact with GaLV contaminated biomaterials such as urine and feces. This is confirmed within hybridization assay which evidenced the lack of proviral genome within uninfected gibbons. Furthermore, experimental research conducted at the Comparative Oncology Laboratory demonstrates the "horizontal transmission of GaLV within a 14-month-old uninfected gibbon which contracted GaLV within six weeks of exposure to viremic individuals." Furthermore, GaLV is also transmitted prenatally via parent-progeny transmission in utero, of which offspring exhibit a large quantity of proviral DNA in opposed to postnatal transmission.

== Signs and symptoms ==
Conditions associated with GALV include neoplastic syndromes leading to susceptible secondary and often fatal diseases including; malignant lymphoma, lymphoblastic leukemia, osteoporosis and granulocytic leukemia. In cases of granulocytic leukemia, increased granulocytes in the peripheral blood infiltrated bone marrow and liver lymph nodes, causing a greenish hue (chlorosis) within these tissues. Pathology study published by Kawakami et al in 1980, identifies the development of chronic granulocytic leukemia within young GaLV infected gibbons after latency periods of 5–11 months. Additionally, the introduction of GaLV into 14-month-old gibbons, demonstrated the production of neutralising antibodies which enabled individuals to remain asymptomatic and free of hematopoietic disease, thereby demonstrating the host's immune response to GaLV infection.

== In medicine ==
=== GaLV envelope protein ===
GaLV Envelope Protein has biomedical significance due to its utility as a viral vector in cancer gene therapy and gene transfer. Retroviral vectors are used in ex vivo gene therapy, which involves the modification of cells in vitro, to replace genes that code for dysfunctional proteins. The inserted gene undergoes transcription and translation within the nucleus and ribosome of the host cell producing "normal" secretable proteins. The earliest retroviral vectors were based on the Moloney murine leukemia virus (MMLV) which when pseudotyped with GaLV envelope protein, enabled gene transfer to various host cells. Furthermore, the development of "hybrid murine amphotropic viral envelope with the extracellular domains of GALV also helps to increase the cell infection rate within the host during gene therapy."

Gene transfer is dependent on the relationship between receptor expression and transduction efficiency. Human T-lymphocytes have two surface receptors (GLVR-1 and GLVR-2) that detect the presence of GaLV. Furthermore, Lam et al evidenced the 8 fold greater expression of GLVR-1 than GLVR-2, which demonstrates that human T lymphocyte gene transfer methods should utilise the GaLV envelope protein that binds to the GLVR-1 surface receptor. However, because gammaretroviruses are incapable of infecting non-dividing cells, the utility of GaLV envelope protein in gene transfer is being superseded by lentiviral vectors.
