= Bovine leukemia virus =

Virus classification
- (unranked): Virus
- Realm: Riboviria
- Kingdom: Pararnavirae
- Phylum: Artverviricota
- Class: Revtraviricetes
- Order: Ortervirales
- Family: Retroviridae
- Genus: Deltaretrovirus
- Species: Deltaretrovirus bovleu

Synonyms
- Bovine leukosis virus; Bovine type C oncovirus

Species of virus

Bovine leukemia virus (BLV) is a retrovirus which causes enzootic bovine leukosis in cattle. It is closely related to the human T‑lymphotropic virus type 1 (HTLV-I). BLV may integrate into the genomic DNA of B‑lymphocytes as a DNA intermediate (the provirus), or exist as unintegrated circular or linear forms. Besides structural and enzymatic genes required for virion production, BLV expresses the Tax protein and microRNAs involved in cell proliferation and oncogenesis . In cattle, most infected animals are asymptomatic; leukemia is rare (about 5% of infected animals), but lymphoproliferation is more frequent (30%).

== Vectors ==
BLV is vectored by insects Anopheles albimanus, Anopheles freeborni, Anopheles quadrimaculatus, Anopheles stephensi, Stomoxys calcitrans, and various Tabanidae including Tabanus atratus and Tabanus fuscicostatus and by the tick Boophilus microplus.

== Disease in cattle ==
=== Transmission ===
Many potential routes of BLV transmission exist. Transmission through procedures that transmit blood between animals such as gouge dehorning, vaccination and ear tagging with instruments or needles that are not changed or disinfected between animals is a significant means of BLV spread. Rectal palpation with common sleeves poses a risk that is increased by inexperience and increased frequency of palpation. Transmission via colostrum, milk, and in utero exposure is generally considered to account for a relatively small proportion of infections. Embryo transfer and artificial insemination also account for a small number of new infections if common equipment and/or palpation sleeves are used. While transmission has been documented via blood feeding insects, the significance of this risk is unclear. Transmission relies primarily on the transfer of infected lymphocytes from one animal to the next, and BLV positive animals with lymphocytosis are more likely to provide a source for infection. Virus particles are difficult to detect and not used for transmission of infection.

=== Clinical signs ===
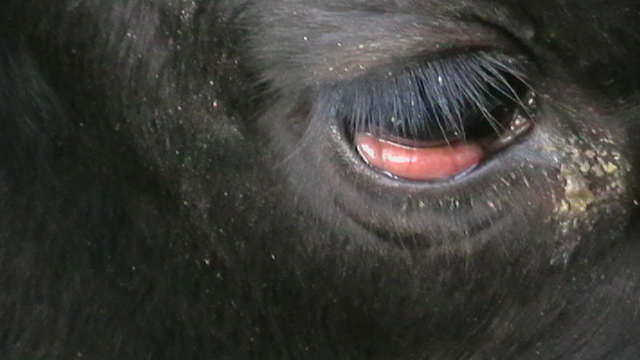
Conjunctival prolapse is a sign of bovine leukosis

In general, BLV causes only a benign mononucleosis-like disease in cattle. Only some animals later develop a B-cell leukemia called enzootic bovine leukosis. Under natural conditions the disease is transmitted mainly by milk to the calf.

The variety of organs where white blood cells occur explains the many symptoms: enlargement of superficial lymph nodes, a digestive form, a cardiac form, a nervous form, a respiratory form, and others. Lymph node enlargement is often an early clinical sign. An unexpected clinical finding is protrusion of the conjunctival membrane, due to enlargement of retro-ocular lymph nodes.

=== Diagnosis ===
Diagnosis relies on agar gel immunodiffusion, ELISA (enzyme linked immunosorbent assay) and PCR (polymerase chain reaction). Post-mortem findings are characteristic and include widespread white tumours in most organs.

=== Treatment and control ===
No treatment is available for the disease. Testing and removing positive animals from the herd is one method of control. In herds where the disease is widespread, it is important to limit spread by avoiding contact with blood between animals.

=== Epidemiology and eradication efforts ===
In Europe attempts were made to eradicate the virus by culling infected animals. The first country considered to be free of infection was Denmark. Soon the United Kingdom followed. Like the North American states, those of the Eastern bloc in Europe did not try to get rid of the virus. But the Eastern Europe states started to become leukosis-free after the political changes at the end of the last century. A quote from a USDA fact sheet, "The high individual animal prevalence of BLV reported in the Dairy 1996 study suggests that testing and culling seropositive animals may not be a cost effective method to control the disease. Instead, preventing disease transmission by implementing preventive practices would likely be more cost-effective.

High prevalence of virus was found from testing by USDA. "As part of the 2007 dairy study, bulk tank milk was collected from 534 operations with 30 or more dairy cows and tested with an Enzyme Linked-Immunosorbent Assay (ELISA) for the presence of antibodies against BLV. Results showed that 83.9 percent of U.S. dairy operations were positive for BLV (table 1). BLV infection can be detected by ELISA or PCR.

=== Vaccination ===
A safe and effective vaccine against BLV has been developed. The approach is based on a provirus with deletions or mutations in genes required for efficient replication (R3,G4, microRNAs, envelope). The attenuated vaccine effectively protects from BLV infection in endemic regions characterized by a high BLV prevalence. Compared to wild-type infection, the humoral response against BLV antigens is only slightly reduced in vaccinated animals. The proviral loads of the attenuated vaccine remain most frequently undetectable. The attenuated strain is not transmitted from mother to offspring, supporting the safety of the vaccine. This vaccine thus induces a persistent anti-BLV immune response through maintaining a low level of infectivity, while preventing the risk of infection by the wild-type virus.

== Potential infection in humans ==
Soon after BLV was discovered in the 1970s, ten studies were done looking for antibodies to BLV in humans. However, no antibodies were found and so researchers concluded that BLV was not a risk to human health. However, more sensitive techniques for detecting antibodies were developed, and in 2003 a test of more than 200 people using these new tests found that more than a third carried antibodies reactive to BLV, and the question began to be researched again.

Several studies have been carried out to determine whether BLV causes disease in humans, testing mostly farm workers who drink raw milk from infected cows.[9] Some long-term studies may be necessary, as there appears to be a correlation in instances of cancer among butchers and slaughterhouse workers. In 2014, researchers discovered the presence of BLV positive cells in the human breast tissue in a sample of US women, and a case-control study published in 2015 suggested that exposure to BLV is associated with breast cancer, also in US women. A later study of Australian women detected retrotranscribed BLV DNA in breast tissue of 40/50(80%) of women with breast cancer versus 19/46(41%) of women with no history of breast cancer, indicating an age-adjusted odds ratio and confidence interval of 4.72(1.71-13.05). These results corroborate the findings of the previous study of US women with an even higher odds ratio for the Australian population. A case-control study of Texas women established an association between BLV presence in breast tissue and breast cancer status with an odds ratio OR 5.1.

In 2019, a review of possible role of Bovine Leukemia Virus in breast cancer is proposed by Gertrude C Buehring.

Another case-control study conducted on Chinese patients did not find any association between BLV and breast cancer. However this study did not look at tissue samples from breast cancer, only blood work. A subsequent evaluation of the Chinese study pointed out weaknesses in methodology used, e.g. a veterinary test kit designed and calibrated for cattle inappropriately used to test for human antibodies, despite warnings against this in kit instructions. An exhaustive analysis of 51 whole genomes of breast cancers by next generation sequencing (NGS) did not show any trace of BLV DNA and thus excludes clonal insertion (integration into human genomic DNA) of BLV into the DNA of breast cancer cells. The DNA sequences available to examine were derived from metastatic sites, according to the statement by the provider (US National Cancer Institute). Since no reads matched BLV related sequences, the NGS also excluded the presence of partial genomes and unintegrated proviral DNA. Another study of 95 women in California found that more than a third had evidence of BLV DNA in their blood cells, and a third had antibodies to BLV, but that these two BLV markers were not correlated with each other in individual donors.

== Infection in other species ==
There are other mammal hosts including Bubalus bubalis, Mus musculus, Oryctolagus cuniculus and Ovis aries. Natural infection of animals other than cattle and buffalo are rare, although many animals are susceptible to artificial infection. After artificial infection of sheep most animals succumb to leukemia. Rabbits get a fatal AIDS-like disease similar to Pasteurella, different from the benign human snuffles. It is not known whether this naturally occurring rabbit disease is linked to BLV infection. "Although several species can be infected by inoculation of the virus, natural infection occurs only in cattle (Bos taurus and Bos indicus), water buffaloes, and capybaras. Sheep are very susceptible to experimental inoculation and develop tumours more often and at a younger age than cattle. A persistent antibody response can also be detected after experimental infection in deer, rabbits, rats, guinea-pigs, cats, dogs, sheep, rhesus monkeys, chimpanzees, antelopes, pigs, goats and buffaloes."

== Research directions ==
Because of the close relationship between BLV and HTLV-I, the research on BLV is important. One can use the experience with BLV for understanding HTLV-I induced diseases like ATL (adult T-cell leukemia) and HAM/TSP (HTLV-1-associated myelopathy/Tropical spastic paraparesis)-like neurological disorders. A number of case-control studies have been conducted, but research into BLV-related diseases has not been as extensive as that conducted into other viral diseases.

== See also ==
- Bovine leukaemia virus RNA packaging signal
