= Woolly monkey sarcoma virus =

Virus classification
- (unranked): Virus
- Realm: Riboviria
- Kingdom: Pararnavirae
- Phylum: Artverviricota
- Class: Revtraviricetes
- Order: Ortervirales
- Family: Retroviridae
- Genus: Gammaretrovirus
- Species: Gammaretrovirus woomonsar

Species of virus

Woolly monkey sarcoma virus (WMSV), with synonym Simian sarcoma virus (often abbreviated by SSV, but this may also stand for some species called Sulfolobus spindle-shaped virus, that belong to different genera in family Fuselloviridae) is a species of gammaretrovirus that infects primates. First isolation was from a fibrosarcoma in a woolly monkey (Lagothrix lagothrica). For its reproduction the virus needs a helper or associated virus which is called Simian sarcoma associated virus (SSAV), also known as woolly monkey virus (WMV).

The WMSV/SSV genome is nearly identical to the WMV/SSAV genome, except the part corresponding to the env gene on the WMV/SSAV genome is replaced by an oncogene called p28/v-sis. The lack of an env renders it reliant on the SSAV for reproduction while the presence of the oncogene makes it sarcoma-causing. v-sis is derived from a primate PDGFB (c-sis) gene that the ancestral WMSV/SSV had picked up instead of its own env gene.

== Simian sarcoma associated virus ==
WMV/SSAV is its own independently-replicating retrovirus. It is usually lumped into the same species as the gibbon ape leukemia virus (GALV). It was originally detected in woolly monkeys co-housed in the same cage as gibbons, so the detection may have been due to a gibbon-to-monkey transmission rather than indicating the true natural host of the virus. Cladistically, the WMV/SSAV branch of the GALV-WMV clade also includes many rodent virues, including the Melomys burtoni retrovirus (MbRV), melomys woolly monkey retrovirus (MelWMV), and complete melomys woolly monkey retrovirus (cMWMV). cMWMV is a complete endogenous retrovirus found in some populations of Melomys leucogaster, still very capable of producing infectious virions, in contrast to earlier Melomys-harbored relatives which were incomplete.

== See also ==
- HL23V
