= SLC20A1 =

Protein-coding gene in the species Homo sapiens

Identifiers
- Aliases: SLC20A1, GLVR1, Glvr-1, PIT1, PiT-1, solute carrier family 20 member 1
- External IDs: OMIM: 137570; MGI: 108392; GeneCards: SLC20A1

Gene location (Human)
Chr.	Chromosome 2 (human)
Band	2q14.1	Start	112,645,939 bp
Band	2q14.1	End	112,663,825 bp

Gene location (Mouse)
Chr.	Chromosome 2 (mouse)
Band	2 F1|2 62.79 cM	Start	129,040,684 bp
Band	2 F1|2 62.79 cM	End	129,053,536 bp
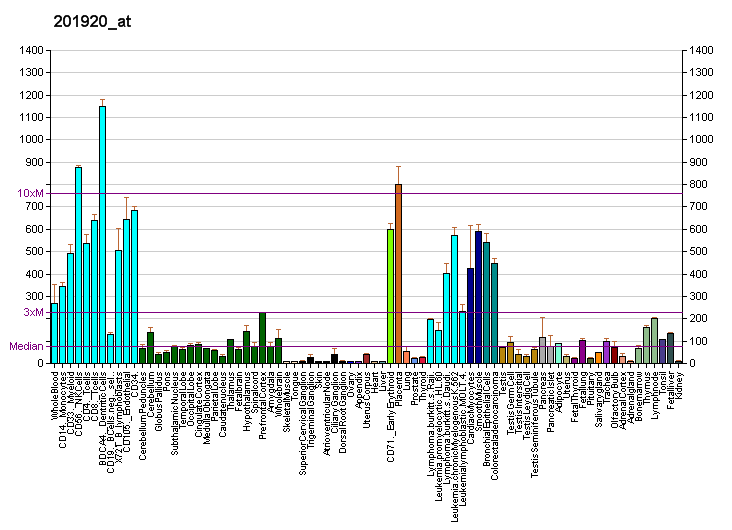
RNA expression pattern
Bgee	Human / Mouse (ortholog); Top expressed in: mucosa of transverse colon; granulocyte; cartilage tissue; trachea; retinal pigment epithelium; mucosa of urinary bladder; trabecular bone; parietal pleura; appendix; mucosa of paranasal sinus / Top expressed in: pontine nuclei; left colon; medial vestibular nucleus; facial motor nucleus; lobe of cerebellum; deep cerebellar nuclei; cerebellar vermis; fetal liver hematopoietic progenitor cell; anterior horn of spinal cord; dorsal tegmental nucleus; More reference expression data
BioGPS	More reference expression data
Gene ontology
Molecular function	sodium:phosphate symporter activity; high-affinity inorganic phosphate:sodium symporter activity; symporter activity; signal transducer activity; inorganic phosphate transmembrane transporter activity; sodium:inorganic phosphate symporter activity
Cellular component	integral component of membrane; plasma membrane; integral component of plasma membrane; membrane
Biological process	phosphate-containing compound metabolic process; positive regulation of I-kappaB kinase/NF-kappaB signaling; phosphate ion transmembrane transport; phosphate ion transport; ion transport; sodium ion transmembrane transport; sodium ion transport; signal transduction; transmembrane transport; sodium-dependent phosphate transport; transport
Sources:Amigo / QuickGO
Orthologs
Databases	NCBI: entry; OMA: entry
Species	Human	Mouse
Entrez	6574	20515
Ensembl	ENSG00000144136	ENSMUSG00000027397
UniProt	Q8WUM9	Q61609
RefSeq (mRNA)	NM_005415	NM_001159593; NM_015747; NM_001355252
RefSeq (protein)	NP_005406	NP_001153065; NP_056562; NP_001342181
Location (UCSC)	Chr 2: 112.65 – 112.66 Mb	Chr 2: 129.04 – 129.05 Mb
PubMed search
- Wikidata
View/Edit Human	View/Edit Mouse

Sodium-dependent phosphate transporter 1 is a protein that in humans is encoded by the SLC20A1 gene.

Retrovirus receptors allow infection of human and murine cells by various retroviruses. The receptors that have been identified at the molecular level include CD4 (MIM 186940) for human immunodeficiency virus, Rec1 for murine ecotropic virus, and GLVR1 for gibbon ape leukemia virus (see MIM 182090). These 3 proteins show no homology to one another at the DNA or protein level. GLVR1 is a sodium-dependent phosphate symporter.[supplied by OMIM]

== Research ==
It was reported that mutations of the gene may cause epispadias or bladder exstrophy.

== See also ==
- Solute carrier family
