= Viral synapse =

Viral synapse (or virological synapse) is a molecularly organized cellular junction that is similar in some aspects to immunological synapses. Many viruses, including herpes simplex virus (HSV), human immunodeficiency virus (HIV), and human T-lymphotropic virus (HTLV) have been shown to instigate the formation of these junctions between the infected ("donor") and uninfected ("target") cell to allow cell-to-cell transmission. As viral synapses allow the virus to spread directly from cell to cell, they also provide a means by which the virus can escape neutralising antibodies.

== Formation and function ==
Formation of these synapses has been shown to involve reorientation of the cytoskeleton, which is triggered by engagement of ICAM-1 on the infected cell's surface and expression of several viral proteins. Viruses use the microtubule cytoskeleton to migrate to the viral synapse. By recruiting the receptors and viral particles at the point of contact, these synaptic structures significantly enhance the likelihood of a productive infection. Viral synapses are thought to explain how cell-to-cell transfer can operate in the HIV infection even when there is a low number of viral particles and a relatively low number of CD4 receptors. A recent study proposes that the primary “killing units” of CD4 T cells leading to CD4 T-cell depletion and progression to AIDS are infected cells (not cell-free viral particles) residing in lymphoid tissues that mediate cell-to-cell spread of the virus via virological synapses. These findings highlight a previously unappreciated role for the virological synapse in HIV pathogenesis.
