= Pralatrexate =

Chemical compound

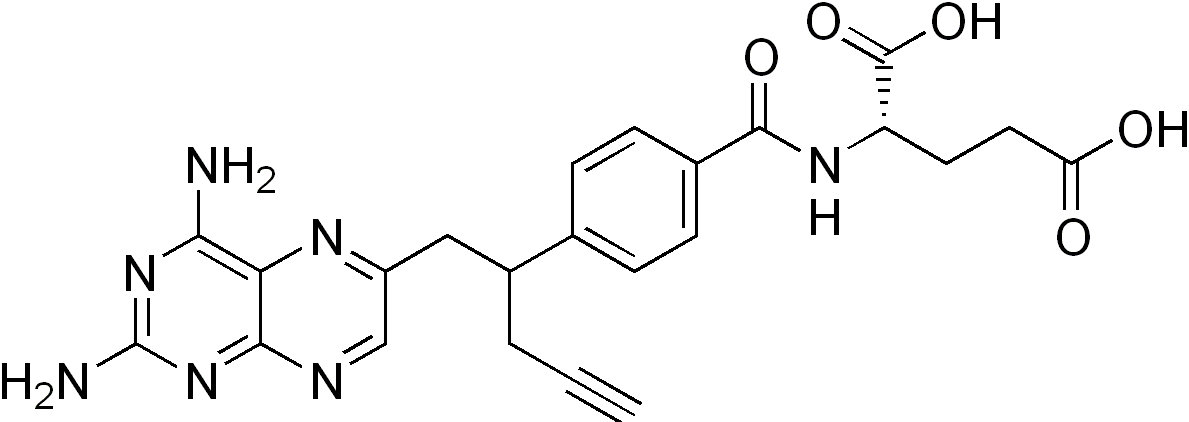

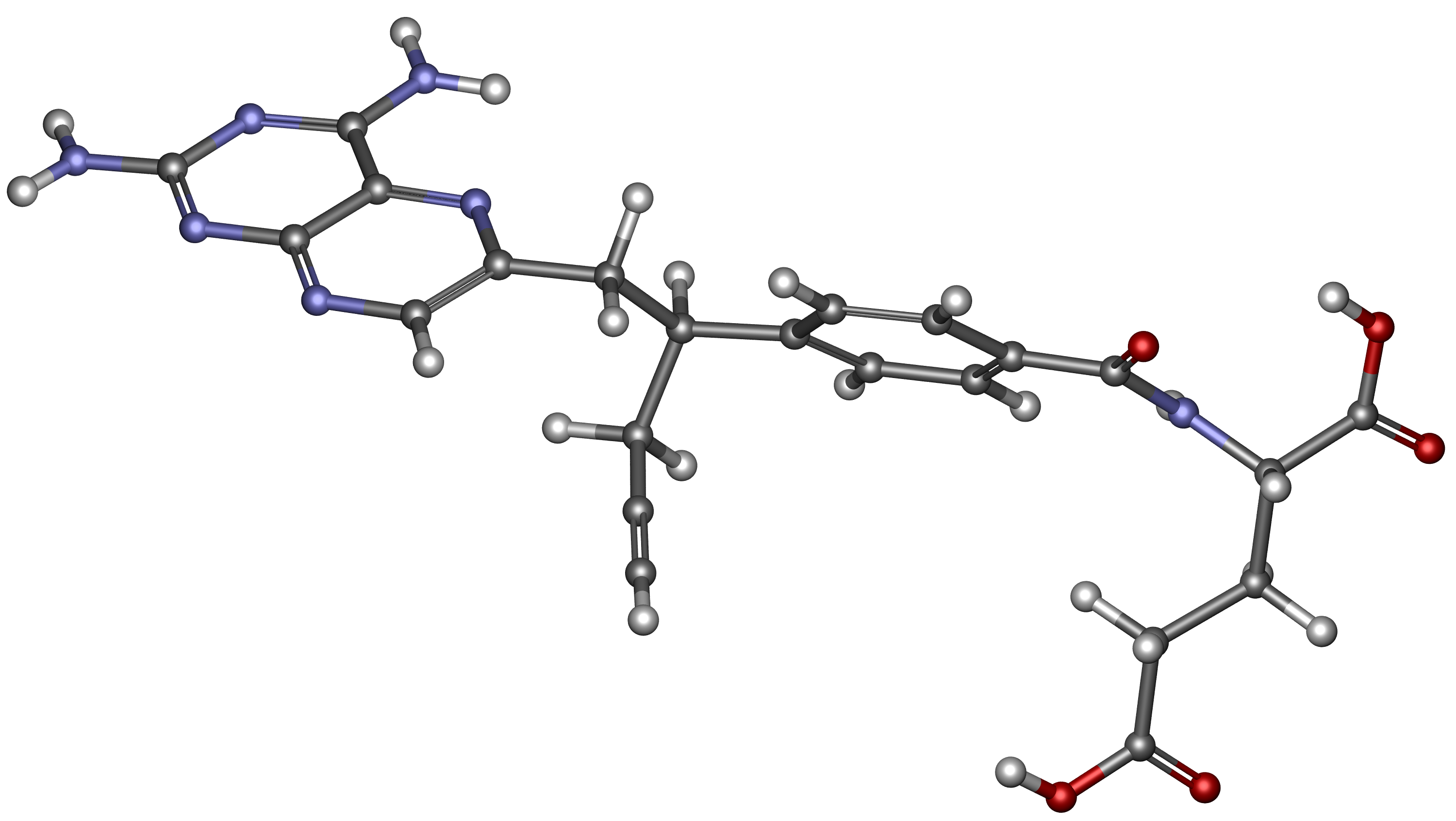

Clinical data
- Trade names: Folotyn
- AHFS/Drugs.com: Monograph
- License data: US FDA: Pralatrexate
- Routes of administration: Intravenous
- ATC code: L01BA05 (WHO)

Legal status
- Legal status: AU: S4 (Prescription only); CA: ℞-only; US: ℞-only

Identifiers
- IUPAC name: N-(4-{1-[(2,4-diaminopteridin-6-yl)methyl]but-3-yn-1-yl}benzoyl)-L-glutamic acid
- CAS Number: 146464-95-1
- PubChem CID: 148121
- IUPHAR/BPS: 6840
- DrugBank: DB06813
- ChemSpider: 130578
- UNII: A8Q8I19Q20
- KEGG: D05589
- ChEBI: CHEBI:71223
- ChEMBL: ChEMBL1201746
- CompTox Dashboard (EPA): DTXSID3048578
- ECHA InfoCard: 100.205.791

Chemical and physical data
- Formula: C_{23}H_{23}N_{7}O_{5}
- Molar mass: 477.481 g·mol^{−1}
- 3D model (JSmol): Interactive image
- SMILES: O=C(O)[C@@H](NC(=O)c1ccc(cc1)C(CC#C)Cc2nc3c(nc2)nc(nc3N)N)CCC(=O)O
- InChI: InChI=1S/C23H23N7O5/c1-2-3-14(10-15-11-26-20-18(27-15)19(24)29-23(25)30-20)12-4-6-13(7-5-12)21(33)28-16(22(34)35)8-9-17(31)32/h1,4-7,11,14,16H,3,8-10H2,(H,28,33)(H,31,32)(H,34,35)(H4,24,25,26,29,30)/t14?,16-/m0/s1; Key:OGSBUKJUDHAQEA-WMCAAGNKSA-N

Pralatrexate, sold under the brand name Folotyn, is a medication used for the treatment of relapsed or refractory peripheral T-cell lymphoma (PTCL).

Pralatrexate was approved for medical use in the United States in September 2009, as the first treatment for Peripheral T-cell Lymphoma (PTCL), an often aggressive type of non-Hodgkins lymphoma.

== Medical uses ==
Pralatrexate is indicated for the treatment of people with relapsed or refractory peripheral T-cell lymphoma (PTCL).

=== Available forms ===
It is administered intravenously weekly for 6 weeks in 7-week cycles, with mandatory folic acid and vitamin B12 supplementation to mitigate toxicities like mucositis.

== Side effects ==
Pralatrexate is associated with several notable side effects, most prominently mucositis, which is considered the most frequently observed adverse event during treatment for relapsed or refractory peripheral T-cell lymphoma. Mucositis risk can be reduced through supplementation with leucovorin, cyanocobalamin, and folic acid. Other adverse effects described include myelosuppression, anemia, thrombocytopenia, neutropenia, and gastrointestinal symptoms, which require monitoring and supportive care to mitigate toxicity.

== Mechanism of action ==
Pralatrexate is a folate analog metabolic inhibitor designed to selectively enter cancer cells that overexpress the reduced folate carrier (RFC-1). Once inside the cell, pralatrexate competitively inhibits dihydrofolate reductase (DHFR), disrupting folate-dependent processes crucial for DNA synthesis, RNA production, and cell division, ultimately leading to apoptosis. Its enhanced cellular uptake and polyglutamylation contribute to prolonged intracellular retention and potent cytotoxicity, distinguishing it from other antifolate agents.

== Discovery ==
Research on this class of drugs began in the 1950s at SRI International, where scientists were focused on developing new chemotherapies and antifolates that would be effective against tumor cells.

In the late 1970s, researchers at Memorial Sloan Kettering Cancer Center discovered, that cancerous cells take in natural folate through a protein identified as plasma membrane transporter (now referred to as "reduced folate carrier type 1" or "RFC-1"). Further research showed that when normal cells evolve into cancerous cells they often overproduce RFC-1 to ensure they get enough folate.

A subsequent scientific collaboration was ultimately formed among SRI International, Memorial Sloan Kettering Cancer Center, and the Southern Research Institute with the intention of developing an antifolate with greater therapeutic selectivity – an agent that could be more effectively internalized into tumors (transported into the cells through RFC-1) and would be more toxic to cancer cells than normal cells.

This collaboration, supported by the National Cancer Institute, led to the identification of pralatrexate in the mid-1990s. Pralatrexate was later licensed to Allos Therapeutics in 2002 for further development. Allos Therapeutics, Inc. was acquired by Spectrum Pharmaceuticals, Inc. on September 5, 2012. Allos is a wholly owned subsidiary of Spectrum.

== Society and culture ==
=== Legal status ===
==== US approval ====
Pralatrexate (Folotyn®) is a folate analogue metabolic inhibitor approved by the U.S. Food and Drug Administration (FDA) in September 2009 as a single-agent therapy for relapsed or refractory (R/R) PTCL, a rare and aggressive subtype of non-Hodgkin lymphoma comprising about 10-15% of cases. It was the first drug specifically approved for this indication, based on accelerated approval criteria emphasizing overall response rate (ORR) as a surrogate for clinical benefit in a disease with limited treatment options and poor prognosis (median overall survival [OS] of 5-11 months post-relapse).

==== EU rejection ====
The European Medicines Agency (EMA) rejected pralatrexate (Folotyn) due to a lack of sufficient clinical evidence of the drug's benefits, which it deemed did not outweigh the risks. The EMA's Committee for Medicinal Products for Human Use (CHMP) highlighted key concerns regarding the study design and the lack of comparative data. This differed from the U.S. Food and Drug Administration (FDA), which granted accelerated approval based on a single-arm trial, which lacked the rigor required for a traditional approval, which was demanded by the EMA.

=== Economics ===
Some oncologists, patient groups, and insurance companies criticized the cost of $30,000 a month or more, which could reach a total of $126,000 during a course of treatment. This is especially troublesome, considering that the development cost of this small molecule pharmaceutical is significantly lower than the development cost of similarly-priced biopharmaceuticals.
