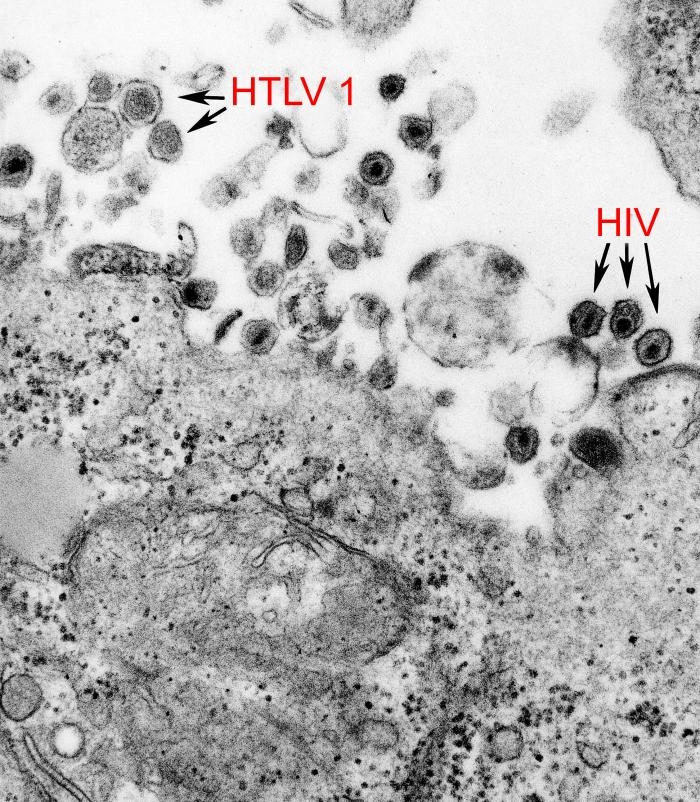
- a micrograph showing both Human T-lymphotropic virus 1 and HIV

Scientific classification
- (unranked): Virus
- Realm: Riboviria
- Kingdom: Pararnavirae
- Phylum: Artverviricota
- Class: Revtraviricetes
- Order: Ortervirales
- Family: Retroviridae
- Subfamily: Orthoretrovirinae
- Genus: Deltaretrovirus

Groups included
- Primate T-lymphotropic virus 1; Primate T-lymphotropic virus 2; Primate T-lymphotropic virus 3; Human T-lymphotropic virus 4 (unrecognized); Simian T-lymphotropic virus 5 (unrecognized)

= Primate T-lymphotropic virus =

Informal grouping of virus species

The primate T-lymphotropic viruses (PTLVs) are a group of retroviruses that infect primates, using their lymphocytes to reproduce. The ones that infect humans are known as human T-lymphotropic virus (HTLV), and the ones that infect Old World monkeys are called simian T-lymphotropic viruses (STLVs). PTLVs are named for their ability to cause adult T-cell leukemia/lymphoma, but in the case of HTLV-1 it can also cause a demyelinating disease called tropical spastic paraparesis. On the other hand, newer PTLVs are simply placed into the group by similarity and their connection to human disease remains unclear.

HTLVs have evolved from STLVs by interspecies transmission. Within each species of PTLV, the HTLV is more similar to its cognate STLV than to the other HTLVs. There are currently three species of PTLVs recognized by the ICTV (P/H/STLV-1, -2, -3), plus two that are reported but unrecognized (HTLV-4, STLV-5). The first known, and still most medically important PTLV is HTLV-1, discovered in 1980.

HTLVs belong to the genus Deltaretrovirus. The only other recognized species in the genus is Bovine leukemia virus, an economically-important cattle pathogen. As its name suggests, this virus causes leukemia in cows.

== General virology ==
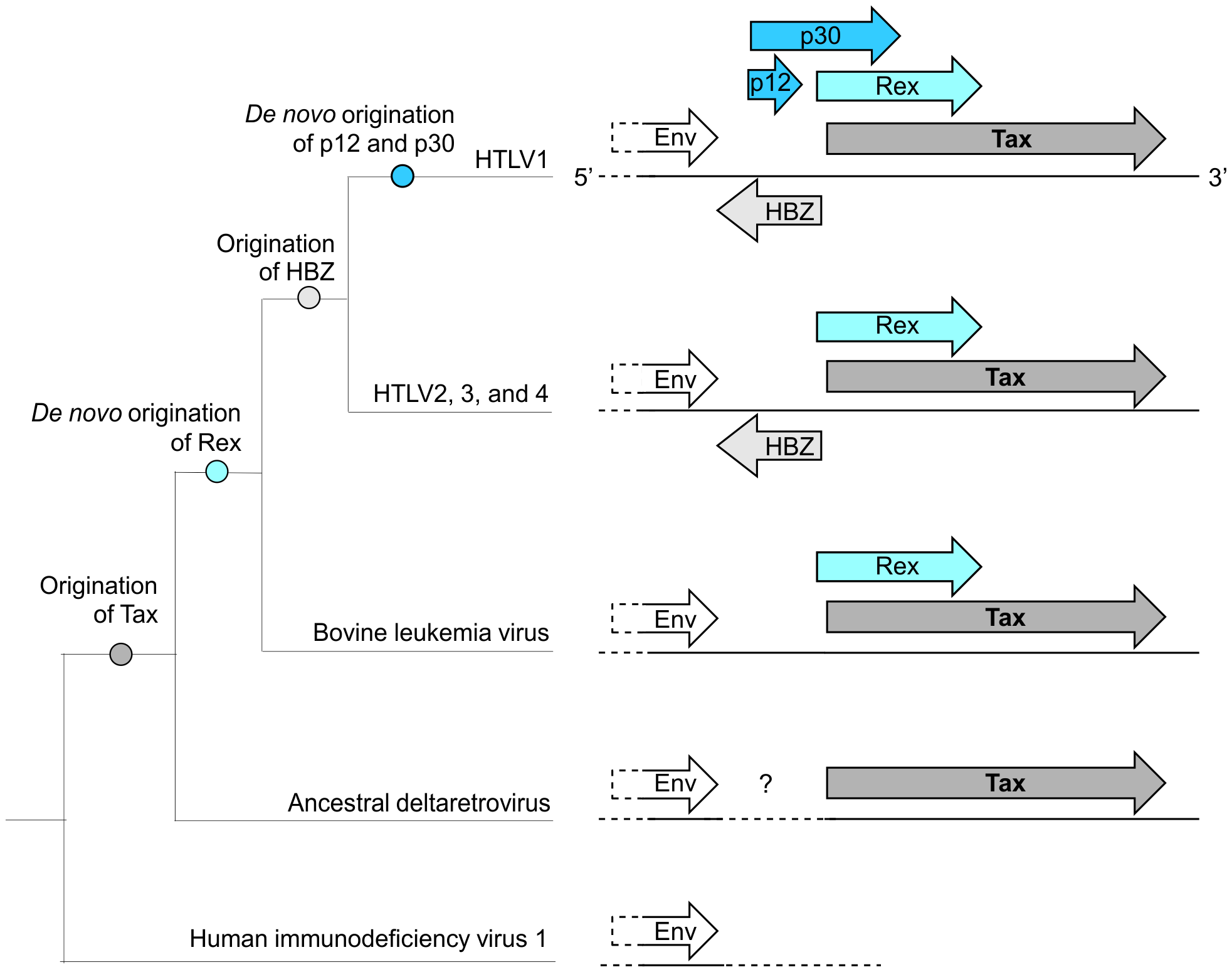
Genomic organization of Deltaretrovirues; gag-pro-pol part trimmed off.

HTLV-1 is the prototypical PTLV, from which comparisons are drawn for the newly-known types. A retrovirus, PTLV shares the common gag-pro-pol-env set of genes, yet shows great complexity in the unique 3' end. These new proteins provide a great source of new adaptive function:

- Tax, the transactivator, is common to all Deltaretrovirus. In a HTLV-1 infection, it is the first protein to be expressed, and in turn is responsible for the expression of the provirus at the LTR during the early phase.
- Rex is also common to all extant Deltaretrovirus. As it gets expressed, Rex binds mRNA to control the extent of splicing.
- HBZ is the first novel protein, only common among PLTV. It encodes a basic leucine zipper, and is known to be enhance HLTV-1 replication and oncogenicity. It is encoded in the opposite ("antisense") direction compared to all other ORFs.
- p12, p8, p30, p13 are the newest class of proteins only found in HTLV-1.

HTLV-1 has three tandem imperfect 21-base repeats as the long terminal repeat, but other PTLVs only have two.

The lifecycle is common to retroviruses, starting at the envelope glycoprotein (Env) surface subunit (SU) binding to a cellular receptor (in this case GLUT1 and a host of other molecules), and ending with lysis of the cell (in this case, a lymphocyte). The virion is spherical to pleomorphic, about 80-100 nm in diameter. Unusually, the single-stranded RNA genome is present in two copies, forming a dimer specifically packed by parts of the gag protein.

== Nomenclatural clarification ==
The use of "HTLV-3" can cause some confusion, because the name HTLV-III was one of the names for HIV in early AIDS literature, but has since fallen out of use. The name HTLV-IV has also been used to describe HIV-2. A large Canadian study documented this confusion among healthcare workers, where >90% of HTLV tests ordered by physicians were actually intended to be HIV tests.

== PTLV-1 ==
PTLV-1 is the medically most important species in the class. Discovered by Robert Gallo and colleagues in 1980, HTLV-1 has been implicated in several kinds of diseases, including tropical spastic paraparesis and as a virus cancer link for adult T-cell leukemia/lymphoma. Between 1 in 20 and 1 in 25 infected people are thought to develop cancer as a result of the virus. STLV-1 is oncogenic in Japanese macaques.

HTLV-1 has seven reported subtypes (subtypes A through G). The great majority of infections are caused by the cosmopolitan subtype A. The HTLV-I/STLV-I history might suggest a simian migration from Asia to Africa not much earlier than 19,500–60,000 years ago.

== HTLV-2 ==
Discovered in 1982, HTLV-2 has not yet been conclusively linked to any disease. It generally causes no symptoms. It might impact the platelet count, contribute to chronic lung infections, or lead to future cutaneous T-cell lymphoma (CTCL), among a host of other proposals.

== HTLV-3 ==
HTLV-3 was discovered in 2005 in rural Cameroon, and were, it is presumed, transmitted from monkeys to hunters of monkeys through bites and scratches. Multiple strains have been identified. A strain has been fully sequenced.

PTLV-3 is about 40% different from PTLV-1 and -2. It occasionally cross-reacts with HTLV-2 tests. It is not yet known how much further transmission has occurred among humans, or whether the virus can cause disease.

== HTLV-4 ==
HTLV-4 was discovered at the same site as HTLV-3 in 2005. Even less is known about this virus, as no simian counterpart has ever been found. The International Committee on Taxonomy of Viruses does not recognize it as a species. The sequence is, however, available.

== STLV-5 ==
STLV-5 is a name used for a highly divergent PTLV-1 strain isolated from Macaca arctoides.

== Transmission ==
HTLV-1 and HTLV-2 can be transmitted sexually, by blood to blood contact (e.g. by blood transfusion or sharing needles when using drugs) and via breast feeding.

== Epidemiology ==
Two HTLVs are well established. HTLV-1 and HTLV-2 are both involved in actively spreading epidemics, affecting 15–20 million people worldwide.

HTLV-1 is the more clinically significant of the two: at least 500,000 of the individuals infected with HTLV-1 eventually develop an often rapidly fatal leukemia, while others will develop a debilitative myelopathy, and yet others will experience uveitis, infectious dermatitis, or another inflammatory disorder. HTLV-2 is associated with milder neurologic disorders and chronic pulmonary infections. In the United States, HTLV-1/2 seroprevalence rates among volunteer blood donors average 0.016 percent.

No specific illnesses have yet been associated with HTLV-3 and HTLV-4.

== Vaccination and treatments ==
While there is no present licensed vaccine, there are many factors which make a vaccine against HTLV-1 feasible. The virus displays relatively low antigenic variability, natural immunity does occur in humans, and experimental vaccination using envelope antigens has been shown to be successful in animal models. Plasmid DNA vaccines elicit potent and protective immune responses in numerous small-animal models of infectious diseases. However, their immunogenicity in primates appears less potent. In the past two decades a large initiative has been put forth to understand the biological and pathogenic properties of the human T-cell lymphotropic virus type 1 (HTLV-1); this has ultimately led to the development of various experimental vaccination and therapeutic strategies to combat HTLV-1 infection. These strategies include the development of envelope glycoprotein derived B-cell epitopes for the induction of neutralizing antibodies, as well as a strategy to generate a multivalent cytotoxic T-lymphocyte (CTL) response against the HTLV-1 Tax antigen. A vaccine candidate that can elicit or boost anti-gp46 neutralizing antibody response may have a potential for prevention and therapy against HTLV-1 infection.

Potential treatments include prosultiamine, a vitamin B-1 derivative, which has been shown to reduce viral load and symptoms; azacytidine, an anti-metabolite, which has been credited with the cure of a patient in Greece; tenofovir disoproxil (TDF), a reverse-transcriptase inhibitor used for HIV; cepharanthine, an alkaloid from Stephania cephalantha Hayata; and phosphonated carbocyclic 2'-oxa-3'aza nucleosides (PCOANs). A newer formulation of TDF, called tenofovir alafenamide (TAF), also has promise as a treatment with less toxicity.
