= Deltaretrovirus =

Virus classification
- (unranked): Virus
- Realm: Riboviria
- Kingdom: Pararnavirae
- Phylum: Artverviricota
- Class: Revtraviricetes
- Order: Ortervirales
- Family: Retroviridae
- Subfamily: Orthoretrovirinae
- Genus: Deltaretrovirus

Species
- See text

Genus of viruses

Deltaretrovirus is a genus of the Retroviridae family. It consists of exogenous horizontally transmitted viruses found in several groups of mammals. The genus contains Bovine leukemia virus and three species of primate T-lymphotropic virus.

The genus of viruses is known for its propensity to target immune cells and oncogenicity, evident in the names of the four named species. Infection is usually asymptomatic, but inflammation and cancer can develop over time.

== Classification ==
The genus contains the following species, listed by scientific name and followed by the exemplar virus of the species:

- Deltaretrovirus bovleu, Bovine leukemia virus
- Deltaretrovirus priTlym1, Primate T-lymphotropic virus 1
- Deltaretrovirus priTlym2, Primate T-lymphotropic virus 2
- Deltaretrovirus priTlym3, Primate T-lymphotropic virus 3

Two additional PTLVs are known but not recognized: HTLV-4 (South Cameroon, 2005) and STLV-5 (Mac B43 strain, highly divergent PTLV-1).

In addition, eight endogenous retroviruses identified as Deltaretrovirus are known as of 2019. Two of these were complete enough to show ORFs; the rest only showing long terminal repeats.

== Hosts ==
Known exogenous deltaretroviruses infect cattle and primates.

The two complete endogenous ones were found in bats and dolphins; the others in Solenodon, mongoose, and fossa. These endogenous examples fill in the large gap in the host range.
