= Current HIV Research =

- Discipline: HIV research
- Language: English
- Edited by: Yuntao Wu

Publication details
- History: Since 2003
- Publisher: Bentham Science Publishers
- Frequency: Bimonthly
- Impact factor: 0.8 (2025)

Standard abbreviations
- ISO 4: Curr. HIV Res.

Indexing
- CODEN: CHRUBF
- ISSN: 1570-162X (print); 1873-4251 (web)
- OCLC no.: 55201118

Links
- Journal homepage

Current HIV Research is a bimonthly peer-reviewed medical journal focusing on HIV/AIDS research, established in 2003. The journal is edited by Yuntao Wu and is published by Bentham Science Publishers. According to the Journal Citation Reports, the journal has a 2025 impact factor of 0.8.

== Abstracting and indexing ==
The journal is abstracted and indexing in:

- BIOSIS Previews
- Chemical Abstracts
- EMBASE
- MEDLINE
- Science Citation Index Expanded
- Scopus
