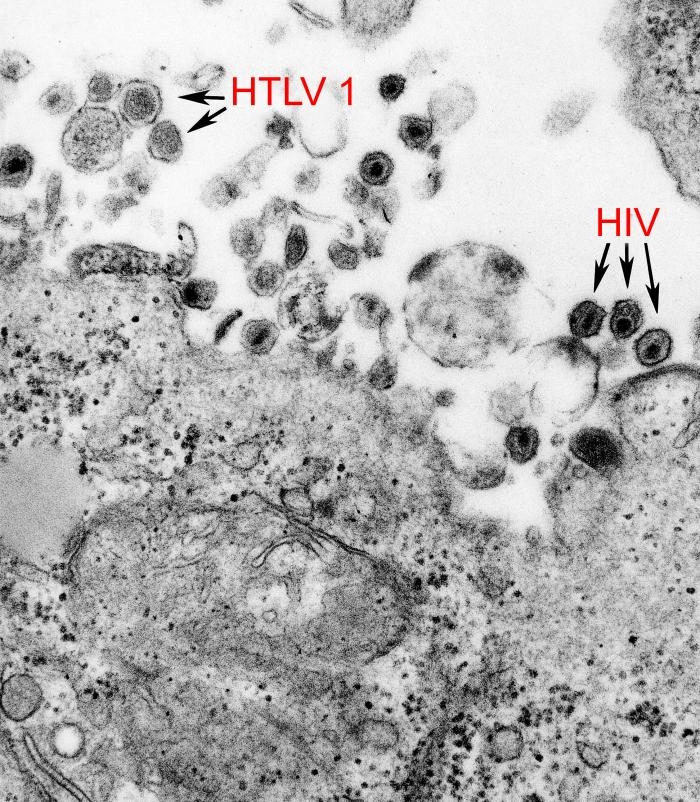
- a micrograph showing both Human T-lymphotropic virus 1 and HIV

Virus classification
- (unranked): Virus
- Realm: Riboviria
- Kingdom: Pararnavirae
- Phylum: Artverviricota
- Class: Revtraviricetes
- Order: Ortervirales
- Family: Retroviridae
- Genus: Deltaretrovirus
- Species: Deltaretrovirus priTlym1

= Human T-lymphotropic virus 1 =

Species of virus

Human T-cell lymphotropic virus type 1 or human T-lymphotropic virus (HTLV-I or HTLV-1), also called the adult T-cell lymphoma virus type 1, is a retrovirus of the human T-lymphotropic virus (HTLV) family.

Most people with HTLV-1 infection do not appear to develop health conditions that can be directly linked to the infection. However, there is a subgroup of people who experience severe complications. The most well characterized are adult T-cell lymphoma (ATL) and HTLV-I-associated myelopathy/tropical spastic paraparesis (HAM/TSP), both of which are only diagnosed in individuals testing positive to HTLV-1 infection. The estimated lifetime risk of ATL among people with HTLV-1 infection is approximately 5%, while that of HAM/TSP is approximately 2%.

In 1977, Adult T-cell lymphoma (ATL) was first described in a case series of individuals from Japan. The symptoms of ATL were different from other lymphomas known at the time. The common birthplace shared amongst most of the ATL patients was suggestive of an infectious cause, referred to as ATLV. Strikingly, ATLV had the transforming activity in vitro. These studies established that HTLV-1 was the causitive agent of ATL. The retrovirus is now generally called HTLV-I because later studies proved that ATLV is the same as the firstly identified human retrovirus called HTLV discovered by Bernard Poiesz and Francis Ruscetti and their co-workers in the laboratory of Robert C. Gallo at the National Cancer Institute. Persistent lifelong infection is established when HTLV-1 integrates into the host genome as a provirus. A patient infected with HTLV-1 can be diagnosed when antibodies against HTLV-1 are detected in the serum.

== Virology ==
HTLV-1 is a retrovirus belonging to the family retroviridae and the genus deltaretrovirus. It has a positive-sense RNA genome that is reverse transcribed into DNA and then integrated into the cellular DNA. Once integrated, HTLV-1 continues to exist only as a provirus which can spread from cell to cell through a viral synapse. Few, if any, free virions are produced and there is usually no detectable virus in the blood plasma though the virus is present in genital secretions. Like HIV, HTLV-1 predominantly infects CD4+ T cells.

The viral RNA is packed into the icosahedral capsid inside the proteinaceous inner envelope. The lipid outer envelope is of host cell origin but contains viral transmembrane and surface proteins. The virion is spherical with a diameter of about 100 nm.

HTLV-1 is genetically classified into seven subtypes, each defined by a unique geographic distribution influenced by population migration. The most globally widespread is the cosmopolitan subtype A, which further branches into several subgroups: transcontinental, Japanese, West African, North African, Senegalese, and Afro-Peruvian. While subtypes B, D, E, F, and G are localized to distinct regions in Africa, subtype C is predominant in Australia and Oceania.

HTLV-1 is believed to have originated from the simian T-lymphotropic virus type 1 (STLV-1), a retrovirus prevalent among numerous nonhuman primates in intertropical Africa. This theory is supported by the significant genetic diversity of HTLV-1 subtypes in Africa, potentially arising from repeated zoonotic transmissions during human interactions with STLV-1 endemic nonhuman primates. This correlation is further reinforced by the observation that individuals bitten by nonhuman primates exhibit HTLV-1 strains with sequences remarkably homologous to the STLV-1 found in local primate species.

== Epidemiology ==
The global distribution of HTLV-I is highly heterogeneous, with focal occurrence in diverse regions. Within areas where HTLV-I is found, its occurrence varies considerably, with endemic clusters often situated near populations with lower prevalence. This pattern might be influenced by the founder effect, suggesting prolonged viral transmission within isolated groups, but this theory warrants further investigation. Consistent findings reveal that HTLV-1 prevalence increases with age and is usually higher in adult females than males. Areas broadly regarded as having endemic regions include Japan, Iran, the Americas, the Caribbean, Melanesia, Central and West Africa, and Australia. Globally, there remains a lack of robust data from populous countries like India and Nigeria and most of North and East Africa. As such, current global prevalence estimates, which are based on known endemic regions, likely underestimate the true global prevalence.

In Australia, HTLV-I has a notably high prevalence among Aboriginal communities in Central Australia. Community-based cross-sectional studies from Central Australia report HTLV-1 prevalences exceeding 30%, representing the highest reported prevalence for any population worldwide. In Taiwan, in Iran, and in Fujian (a Chinese province near Taiwan) the prevalence is 0.1–1%. The infection rate is about 1% in Papua New Guinea, the Solomon Islands, and Vanuatu, where genotype C predominates. In Europe HTLV-1 is uncommon, although it is present in some populations, generally people who have migrated from known endemic regions. In the Americas, HTLV-1 is found in some Indigenous populations and descendants of African ancestry from where it is thought to have originated. Prevalence ranges from 0.1 to 1%. In Africa, the prevalence is not well known, but it is about 1% in some countries.

HTLV-I infection in the United States appears to be about half as prevalent among IV drug users and about one-tenth as prevalent in the population at large as HIV infection. Although little serologic data exist, the prevalence of infection is thought to be highest among blacks living in the Southeast. A prevalence rate of 30% has been found among black intravenous drug users in New Jersey, and a rate of 49% has been found in a similar group in New Orleans.

It is also high among the Inuit of Northern Canada, in Japan, northeastern Iran, Peru, the Pacific coast of Colombia and Ecuador, and the Caribbean.

== Transmission ==
HTLV-1 has three main routes of transmission. Vertical transmission is most common, through which an infected mother transmits the virus to her child. The risk to a fetus while inside the womb is minimal, given the virtual absence of viral particles in human plasma. Most vertical infection occurs through breastfeeding. About 25% of infants who are breastfed by infected mothers are infected, while less than 5% of children born to but not breastfed by infected mothers are infected. Sexual transmission is the second-most common, whereby an individual infects another through an exchange of bodily fluids. Some evidence has suggested that male-to-female transmission is more efficient than female-to-male transmission. For example, one study in Japan found a 61% transmission rate for males to females vs. a less than 1% rate for females to males. The least common is parenteral transmission through blood transfusion, with an infection rate of 44-63% estimated in one study, and needle sharing among intravenous drug users. With proper prophylaxis (e.g. breastfeeding counseling for mothers, condom use, and donor blood screening), rates of transmission can be effectively reduced. The importance of the various routes of transmission is believed to vary geographically. The research in discordant couples showed that the probability of sexual transmission is about 0.9 per 100 person-years.

- In Japan, the geographic clustering of infections suggests that the virus is more dependent on mother-to-child transmission.
- In the Caribbean, the geographic distribution of the virus is more uniform, and it is more common among those with many sexual partners, indicating that sexual transmission is more common.

== Tropism ==
The term viral tropism refers to which cell types HTLV-I can infect. Although HTLV-1 is primarily found in CD4^{+} T cells, other cell types in the peripheral blood of infected individuals have been found to contain HTLV-1, including CD8^{+} T cells, dendritic cells, and B cells. HTLV-I entry is mediated through the interaction of the surface unit of the virion envelope glycoprotein (SU) with its cellular receptor GLUT1, a glucose transporter, on target cells.

== Associated diseases ==
=== Malignancies ===
==== Adult T cell leukemia/lymphoma ====
HTLV-1 is also associated with adult T-cell leukemia/lymphoma and has been quite well studied in Japan. The time between infection and onset of cancer also varies geographically. It is believed to be about sixty years in Japan and less than forty years in the Caribbean. The cancer is thought to be due to the pro-oncogenic effect of viral RNA incorporated into host lymphocyte DNA. Chronic stimulation of the lymphocytes at the cytokine level may play a role in the development of the malignancy. The lymphoma ranges from a very indolent and slowly progressive type to a very aggressive and nearly uniformly lethal proliferative type.

==== Cutaneous T-cell lymphoma ====
There is some evidence that HTLV-1 is a causative agent of cutaneous T-cell lymphoma.

=== Inflammatory diseases ===
==== HTLV myelopathy/tropical spastic paraparesis ====
HTLV-1 is also associated with a progressive demyelinating upper motor neuron disease known as HTLV-1 associated myelopathy/tropical spastic paraparesis (HAM/TSP), characterized by sensory and motor deficits, particularly of the lower extremities, incontinence and impotence. Only 0.3 to 4% of infected individuals develop HAM/TSP, but this will vary from one geographic location to another.

Signs and symptoms of HTLV myelopathy include:

- Motor and sensory changes in the extremities
- Spastic gait in combination with weakness of the lower limbs
- Clonus
- Bladder dysfunction (neurogenic bladder) and bladder cancer

Other neurologic findings that may be found in HTLV include:

- Mild cognitive impairment
- Erectile dysfunction

==== Arthropathy ====
HTLV-1 is associated with a rheumatoid-like arthropathy, although the evidence is contradictory. In these cases, patients have a negative rheumatoid factor.

==== Uveitis ====
Studies from Japan demonstrated that HTLV-1 infection may be associated with an intermediate uveitis. At onset the patients present with blurred vision and floaters. The prognosis is favorable—the condition usually resolves within weeks.

=== Opportunistic infections ===
Individuals infected with HTLV-1 are at risk for opportunistic infections—diseases not caused by the virus itself but by alterations in the host's immune functions.

HTLV-1, unlike the distantly related retrovirus HIV, has an immunostimulating effect which becomes immunosuppressive. The virus activates a subset of T-helper cells called Th1 cells. The result is a proliferation of Th1 cells and overproduction of Th1-related cytokines (mainly IFN-γ and TNF-α). Feedback mechanisms of these cytokines cause a suppression of the Th2 lymphocytes and a reduction of Th2 cytokine production (mainly IL-4, IL-5, IL-10 and IL-13). The result is a reduction in the ability of the infected host to mount an adequate immune response to invading organisms that require a predominantly Th2-dependent response (these include parasitic infections and the production of mucosal and humoral antibodies).

In the central Australian Aboriginal population, HTLV-1 is thought to be related to their extremely high rate of death from sepsis. It is also particularly associated with bronchiectasis, a chronic lung condition predisposing to recurrent pneumonia. It is also associated with chronic infected dermatitis, often superinfected with Staphylococcus aureus and a severe form of Strongyloides stercoralis infection called hyper-infestation which may lead to death from polymicrobial sepsis. HTLV-1 infection has also been associated with Tuberculosis.

== Treatment ==
Treatment of opportunistic infections varies depending on the type of disease and ranges from careful observation to aggressive chemotherapy and antiretroviral agents. Adult T cell lymphoma is a common complication of HTLV infection and requires aggressive chemotherapy, typically R-CHOP. Other treatments for ATL in HTLV-infected patients include interferon alpha, zidovudine with interferon alpha and CHOP with arsenic trioxide. Treatments for HTLV myelopathy are even more limited and focus mainly on symptomatic therapy. Therapies studied include corticosteroids, plasmapheresis, cyclophosphamide, and interferon, which may produce a temporary symptomatic improvement in myelopathy symptoms.

Valproic acid has been studied to determine if it might slow the progression of HTLV disease by reducing viral load. Although in one human study, it was effective in reducing viral load, there did not appear to be a clinical benefit. Recently, however, a study of valproic acid combined with zidovudine showed a major decrease in the viral load of baboons infected with HTLV-1. It is important to monitor HTLV patients for opportunistic infections such as cytomegalovirus, histoplasmosis, scabies, pneumocystis pneumonia, and staphylococcal infections. HIV testing should also be performed, as some patients may be co-infected with both viruses.

Allogenic bone marrow transplantation has been investigated to treat HTLV-1 disease with varied results. One case report describes an HTLV-1-infected woman who developed chronic refractory eczema, corneal injury, and adult T-cell leukemia. She was subsequently treated with allogeneic stem cell transplantation and had complete resolution of symptoms. One year post-transplant, she has had no recurrence of any symptoms, and furthermore has had a decrease in her proviral load.
