= Robert Gallo =

American biomedical researcher (born 1937)

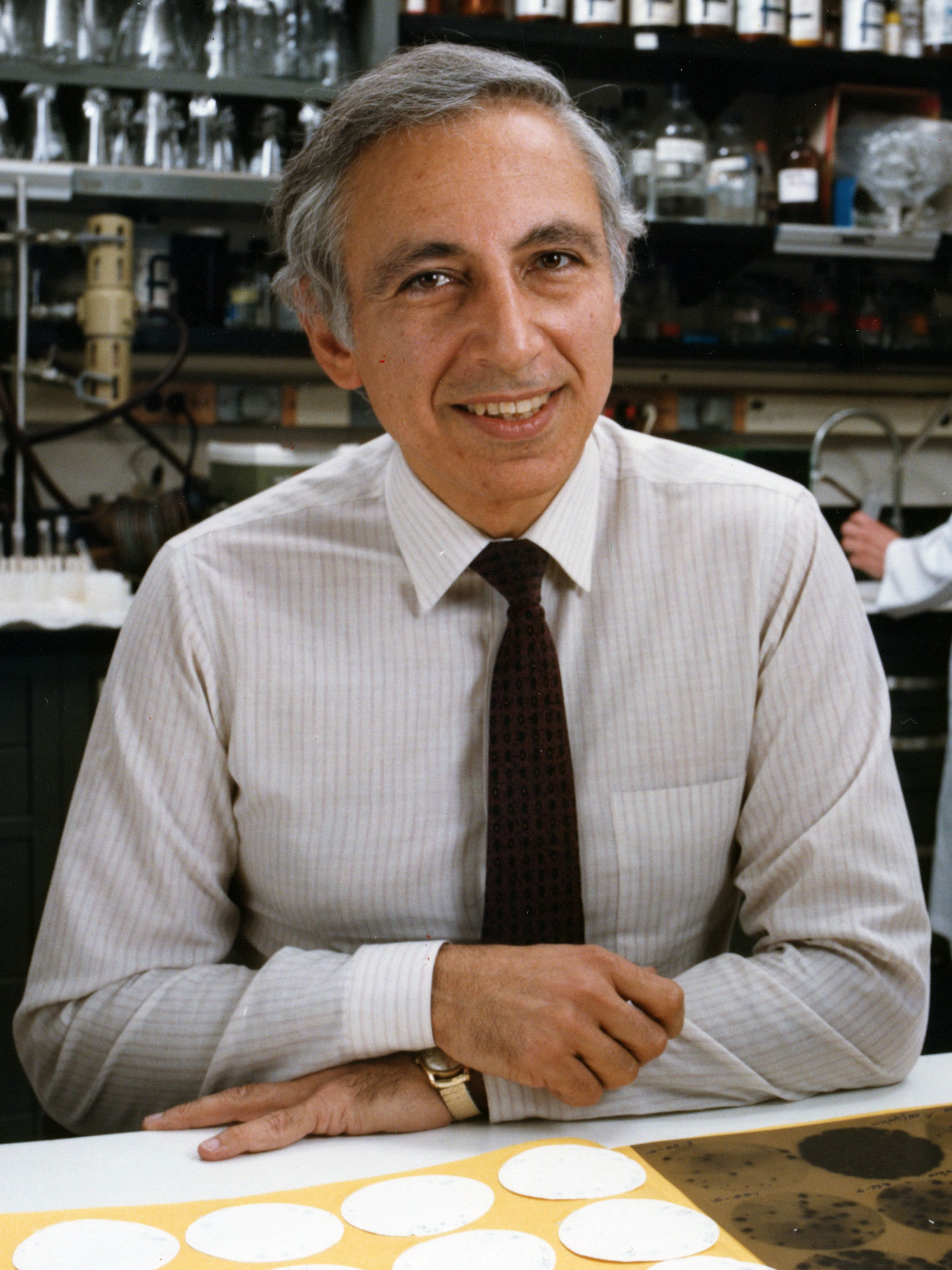
- Gallo in 1980
- Born: Robert Charles Gallo; March 23, 1937 (age 89); Waterbury, Connecticut, U.S.
- Education: Providence College (BS); Thomas Jefferson University (MD)
- Years active: 1963–present
- Known for: Co-discoverer of HIV
- Medical career
- Profession: Medical doctor
- Institutions: National Cancer Institute
- Sub-specialties: Infectious disease and virology
- Research: Biomedical research
- Awards: Lasker Award (1982, 1986); Charles S. Mott Prize (1984); Dickson Prize (1985); Japan Prize (1988); Paul Ehrlich and Ludwig Darmstaedter Prize (1999); Gold Mercury International Award (2006); Dan David Prize (2009)

Robert Charles Gallo (/ˈɡɑːloʊ/; born March 23, 1937) is an American biomedical researcher. He is best known for his role in establishing the human immunodeficiency virus (HIV) as the infectious agent responsible for acquired immune deficiency syndrome (AIDS) and in the development of the HIV blood test, and he has been a major contributor to subsequent HIV research.

Gallo is the director and co-founder of the Institute of Human Virology (IHV) at the University of Maryland School of Medicine in Baltimore, Maryland, established in 1996 in a partnership including the State of Maryland and the City of Baltimore. In November 2011, Gallo was named the first Homer & Martha Gudelsky Distinguished Professor in Medicine. Gallo is also a co-founder of biotechnology company Profectus BioSciences, Inc. and co-founder and scientific director of the Global Virus Network (GVN).

Gallo was the most cited scientist in the world from 1980 to 1990, according to the Institute for Scientific Information, and he was ranked third in the world for scientific impact for the period 1983–2002. He has published over 1,300 papers.

== Early life and education ==
Gallo was born in Waterbury, Connecticut, to a working-class family of Italian descent. He earned a B.S. degree in biology in 1959 from Providence College and received a M.D. from Jefferson Medical College in Philadelphia, Pennsylvania, in 1963. After completing his medical residency at the University of Chicago, he became a researcher at the National Cancer Institute, where he worked for 30 years, mainly as head of the Laboratory of Tumor Cell Biology.

== Career ==
Gallo states that his choice of profession was influenced by the early death of his sister from leukemia, a disease to which he initially dedicated much of his research.

=== Interleukin-2 (IL-2) and the discovery of human retroviruses ===
After listening to a talk by biologist David Baltimore and further stimulation from his virologist colleague, Robert Ting, concerning the work of the late Howard Martin Temin, Gallo became interested in the study of retroviruses, and made their study the primary activity of his lab. In 1976, Doris Anne Morgan, a first year post-doctoral fellow in Gallo's lab, was asked by Gallo to examine culture fluid of activated lymphocytes for the possible production of growth factors. Soon she was successful in growing T lymphocytes. Gallo, Morgan and Frank Ruscetti, another researcher in Gallo's lab, coauthored a paper in Science describing their method. The Gallo group identified this as T-cell growth factor (TCGF). The name was changed in 1978 to IL-2 (interleukin-2) by the Second International Lymphokine Conference (which was held in Interlaken, Switzerland). Although earlier reports had described soluble molecules with biologic effects, the effects and biochemistry of the factors were not well characterized. One such example was the report by Julius Gordon in 1965, which described blastogenic transformation of lymphocytes in extracellular media. However, cell growth was not demonstrated and the affected cell type was not identified, making the identity of the factor(s) involved unclear and its natural function unknown.

The discovery of IL-2 allowed T cells, previously thought to be dead end cells, to be grown significantly in culture for the first time, opening research into many aspects of T cell immunology. Gallo's lab later purified and biochemically characterized IL-2. This breakthrough also allowed researchers to grow T-cells and study the viruses that affect them, such as human T-cell leukemia virus, or HTLV, the first retrovirus identified in humans, which Bernard Poiesz, another post-doctoral fellow in Gallo's lab played a key role in its isolation. HTLV's role in leukemia was clarified when Kiyoshi Takatsuki and other Japanese researchers, puzzling over an outbreak of a rare form of leukemia, later independently found the same retrovirus, and both groups showed HTLV to be the cause. At the same time, a similar HTLV-associated leukemia was identified by the Gallo group in the Caribbean. In 1982, Gallo received the Lasker Award: "For his pioneering studies that led to the discovery of the first human RNA tumor virus [the old name for retroviruses] and its association with certain leukemias and lymphomas."

=== HIV/AIDS research ===
On May 4, 1984, Gallo and his collaborators published a series of four papers in the scientific journal Science demonstrating that a retrovirus they had isolated, called HTLV-III in the belief that the virus was related to the leukemia viruses of Gallo's earlier work, was the cause of AIDS. A French team at the Pasteur Institute in Paris, France, led by Luc Montagnier, had published a paper in Science in 1983, describing a retrovirus they called LAV (lymphadenopathy associated virus), isolated from a patient at risk for AIDS.

Gallo was awarded his second Lasker Award in 1986 for "determining that the retrovirus now known as HIV-1 is the cause of Acquired Immune Deficiency Syndrome (AIDS)." He is the only recipient of two Lasker Awards. In 1986, Gallo, Dharam Ablashi, and Syed Zaki Salahuddin discovered human herpesvirus 6 (HHV-6), later found to cause Roseola infantum, an infantile disease. In 1989, at a conference sponsored by the Catholic Church at Vatican City on HIV/AIDS, Gallo promised attendees that there would be an effective vaccine by 1992.

In 1991, following years of controversy surrounding a 1987 out of court settlement between the National Institutes of Health and France's Pasteur Institute, Gallo admitted the virus he claimed to have discovered in 1984 was in reality a virus sent to him from France the year before, putting an end to a six-year effort by Gallo and his employer, the National Institutes of Health, to claim the AIDS virus as an independent discovery. By the end of 1992 the Office of Research Integrity (ORI) found Gallo to be guilty of research misconduct. In late 1993 the ORI dropped the allegations because, based on "new standards", the evidence was insufficient to prove their case. As a result, in 1994 the French-American blood-test agreement was tweaked, so that Montagnier received a bigger share of royalties from the sale of test kits.

In 1995, Gallo with his colleagues Paolo Lusso and Fiorenza Cocchi published their discovery that chemokines, a class of naturally occurring compounds, are potent and specific HIV inhibitors. This discovery was heralded by Science magazine as one of the top scientific breakthroughs of the year. The role chemokines play in controlling the progression of HIV infection has influenced thinking on how AIDS works against the human immune system and led to a class of drugs used to treat HIV, the chemokine antagonists or entry inhibitors, and helped (conceptually) in the advances that led to the discovery of the cell co-receptor for HIV infection, because this is the molecule the HIV inhibitory molecules bind.

Gallo and two longtime scientific collaborators, Robert R. Redfield and William A. Blattner, founded the Institute of Human Virology in 1996. Gallo's team at the institute maintain an ongoing program of scientific research and clinical care and treatment for people living with HIV/AIDS, treating more than 5,000 patients in Baltimore and 500,000 patients at institute-supported clinics in Africa and the Caribbean. In July 2007, Gallo and his team were awarded a $15 million grant from the Bill and Melinda Gates Foundation for research into a preventive vaccine for HIV/AIDS. Additionally, in 2011 Gallo and his team received $23.4 million from a consortium of funding sources to support the next phase of research into the Institute of Human Virology's (IHV) promising HIV/AIDS preventive vaccine candidate. The IHV vaccine program grants included $16.8 million from the Bill & Melinda Gates Foundation, $2.2 million from the U.S. Army's Military HIV Research Program (MHRP), and other research funding from a variety of sources including the U.S. National Institutes of Health (NIH).

==== Priority and the 2008 Nobel Prize ====
Assignment of priority for the discovery of HIV has been controversial and was a subplot in the 1993 American television film docudrama (and earlier book about the early history of AIDS) And the Band Played On. In the film, Gallo was portrayed by Alan Alda.

Montagnier's group in France isolated HIV almost one and a half years before Gallo, while Gallo's group demonstrated that the virus causes AIDS and generated much of the science that made the discovery possible, including a technique previously developed by Gallo's lab for growing T cells in the laboratory. When Montagnier's group first published their discovery, they said HIV's role in causing AIDS "remains to be determined."

In 1989, the investigative journalist John Crewdson suggested that Gallo's lab might have misappropriated a sample of HIV isolated at the Pasteur Institute by Montagnier's group. Investigations by the National Institutes of Health (NIH) and the HHS ultimately found no conclusive proof of intentional fraud and demonstrated that they had numerous isolates of HIV of their own. As part of these investigations, the United States Office of Research Integrity at the National Institutes of Health commissioned Hoffmann–La Roche scientists to analyze archival samples established at the Pasteur Institute and the Laboratory of Tumor Cell Biology (LTCB) of the National Cancer Institute between 1983 and 1985. They concluded that the virus used in Gallo's lab had come from Montagnier's lab; it was a virus from a patient that had contaminated a virus sample from another patient. On request, Montagnier's group had sent a sample of this culture to Gallo, not knowing it contained two viruses. The sample then contaminated the pooled culture on which Gallo was working. On 12 December 1985 the Institut Pasteur filed suit to challenge a patent for an HIV test that had been granted on 28 May 1985 to the United States Department of Health and Human Services (HHS). In 1987, the two governments agreed to split equally the proceeds from the patent, naming Montagnier and Gallo co-discoverers. Montagnier and Gallo resumed collaborating with each other again for a chronology that appeared in Nature in 1987.

In the November 29, 2002 issue of Science, Gallo and Montagnier published a series of articles, one of which was co-written by both scientists, in which they acknowledged the pivotal roles that each had played in the discovery of HIV, as well as a historical review in the New England Journal of Medicine.

In 2008, Montagnier and his colleague Françoise Barré-Sinoussi from the Institut Pasteur were awarded the Nobel Prize in Physiology or Medicine for their work on the discovery of HIV. Harald zur Hausen also shared the Prize for his discovery that human papilloma viruses lead to cervical cancer, but Gallo was left out. Gallo said that it was "a disappointment" that he was not named a co-recipient. Montagnier said he was "surprised" Gallo was not recognized by the Nobel Committee: "It was important to prove that HIV was the cause of AIDS, and Gallo had a very important role in that. I'm very sorry for Robert Gallo."

== Organizations ==
In 2005, Gallo co-founded Profectus BioSciences, Inc., a biotechnology company. Profectus develops and commercializes technologies to reduce the morbidity and mortality caused by human viral diseases, including HIV.

In March 2011, Gallo founded the Global Virus Network in conjunction with William Hall of University College Dublin and Reinhard Kurth of the Robert Koch Institute. The network's goals include increasing collaboration among virus scholars, expanding virologist training programs, and overcoming gaps in research, especially during the early stages of viral epidemics.
