= Elizabeth Beach Keller =

American biochemist

- Born: 28 December 1918; Fujian, China
- Died: 27 December 1997 (aged 78); Rochester, New York
- Education: Cornell University
- Known for: Protein formation, cloverleaf model of transfer RNA
- Scientific career
- Fields: Biochemistry, Molecular biology
- Workplaces: Cornell University, Harvard University, Massachusetts Institute of Technology

Elizabeth Beach Keller (1918—1997) was an American biochemist. She is noted for her discoveries on protein formation. These included her development of the cloverleaf model of transfer RNA (ribonucleic acid), which shows how transfer RNA helps in directing the genetic information within the DNA to form proteins. This model was included in Robert W. Holley's set of works that earned him a share of the Nobel Prize.

== Biography ==
Keller was born Elizabeth Waterbury Beach on December 28, 1918, in Diongloh, Fujian province, China. She was the youngest daughter of Frederick P. Beach and Ruth W. Beach, who were congregational missionaries stationed in the Chinese province. Her formal education began when the family relocated to the United States. She spent two years at Oberlin College before obtaining her Bachelor of Science degree at the University of Chicago. Keller completed her master's degree at George Washington University and her Ph.D. in biochemistry at Cornell Medical College, where she investigated the formation and transfer of methyl groups in metabolisms for her dissertation.

Keller was married to Geoffrey Keller in 1941 but the marriage later ended in divorce.

== Career ==
After completing her postgraduate degree, Keller first worked at the Cornell Medical College as an assistant professor. From 1948 to 1949, she was an Atomic Energy Commission fellow at Ohio State University's College of Medicine. After this period, she investigated the process of making proteins in cells at Harvard University and the Massachusetts Institute of Technology (1949–1960). Her collaboration with Paul Zamecnik included several studies that investigated the incorporation of labeled amino acids into proteins. Keller's research paved the way for more productive in vitro experiments on protein synthesis after she introduced the use of radioactive leucine in the process. Her and Zamecnik's work with Mahlon Hoagland also led to the discovery of the initial stages of protein synthesis.

In 1965, she joined Cornell University and worked with Holley, who was studying the transfer-RNA structure. She found that the workings of transfer RNA is best shown through the cloverleaf model and had demonstrated it using pipe cleaners and pieces of Velcro. The cloverleaf model itself was one of the secondary structures for the first tRNA sequence that she developed with James Penswick, a student member of the Holley group. The study would later earn for Holley the Nobel Prize in Physiology or Medicine in 1968. Keller as well as the other members of the research team received part of the prize money.

After her work at Cornell, Keller's research focused more on cancer-causing genes. While she retired in 1988, she continued her research work until close to her death. Keller died on December 27, 1997, in Rochester, New York due to complications from acute leukemia.

== Works ==
- The effect of guanosine diphosphate and triphosphate on the incorporation of labeled amino acids into proteins (1956)
- Intron Splicing: A Conserved Internal Signal in Introns of Animal Pre-mRNAs (1984)
- The Biosynthesis of RNA's: Mechanisms and Controls (1985)
- Effects of therapeutic touch on tension headache pain (1986)

== See also ==
- History of RNA biology
- List of RNA biologists
