= Pauline Londeix =

French activist researcher and writer (born 1986)

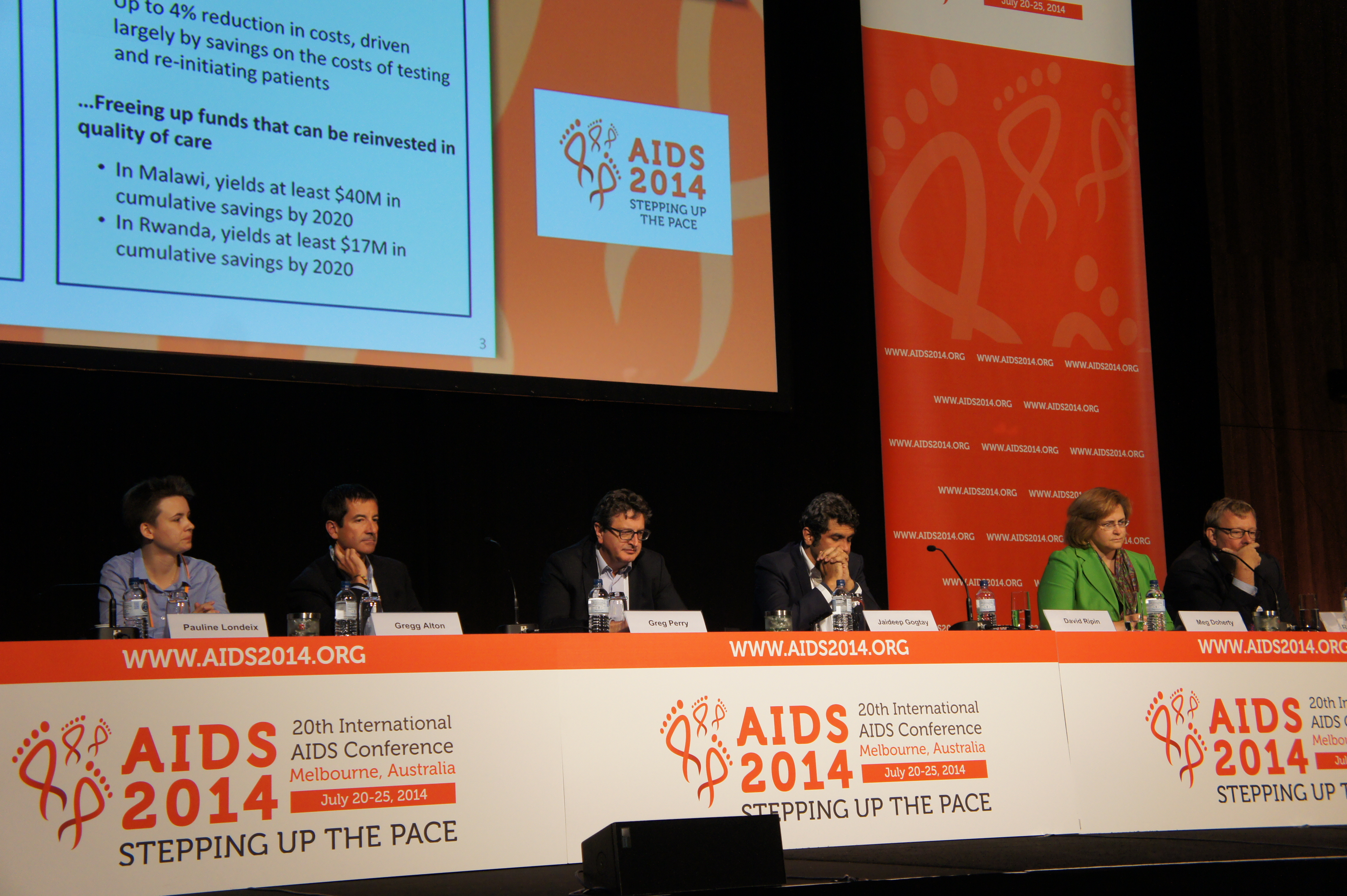
Pauline Londeix with Gregg Alton and Gregg Perry, at the International AIDS conference 2014 in Melbourne

Pauline Londeix (born in 1986) is a French activist researcher and writer, who has been particularly involved in the fight for access to generic medicines used against HIV and Hepatitis C virus (HCV), in particular through contributing to challenging monopolies and intellectual property barriers in the Global South, but also in high income countries, such as France. In 2008, she was the Vice President of the French HIV/AIDS organisation Act Up-Paris. In 2011, she co-founded Act Up-Basel.

== Background ==
She has been involved in the fight against HIV/AIDS since 2005. In 2009, she took part to a cross interview with Françoise Barré-Sinoussi in the French daily paper Libération. Since 2011, she has been particularly involved in the access to new hepatitis C breakthrough treatments : the direct acting antivirals. She is the main author of the Medecins du Monde's report "New treatments for hepatitis C virus : strategies for achieving universal access" (2014) that was presented during the International aids conference that took place in Melbourne. She is the author or the co-author of various articles and reports linked to access to medicines.

== See also ==
- HIV/AIDS
- ACT UP
