= Luc Montagnier =

French virologist and Nobel laureate (1932–2022)

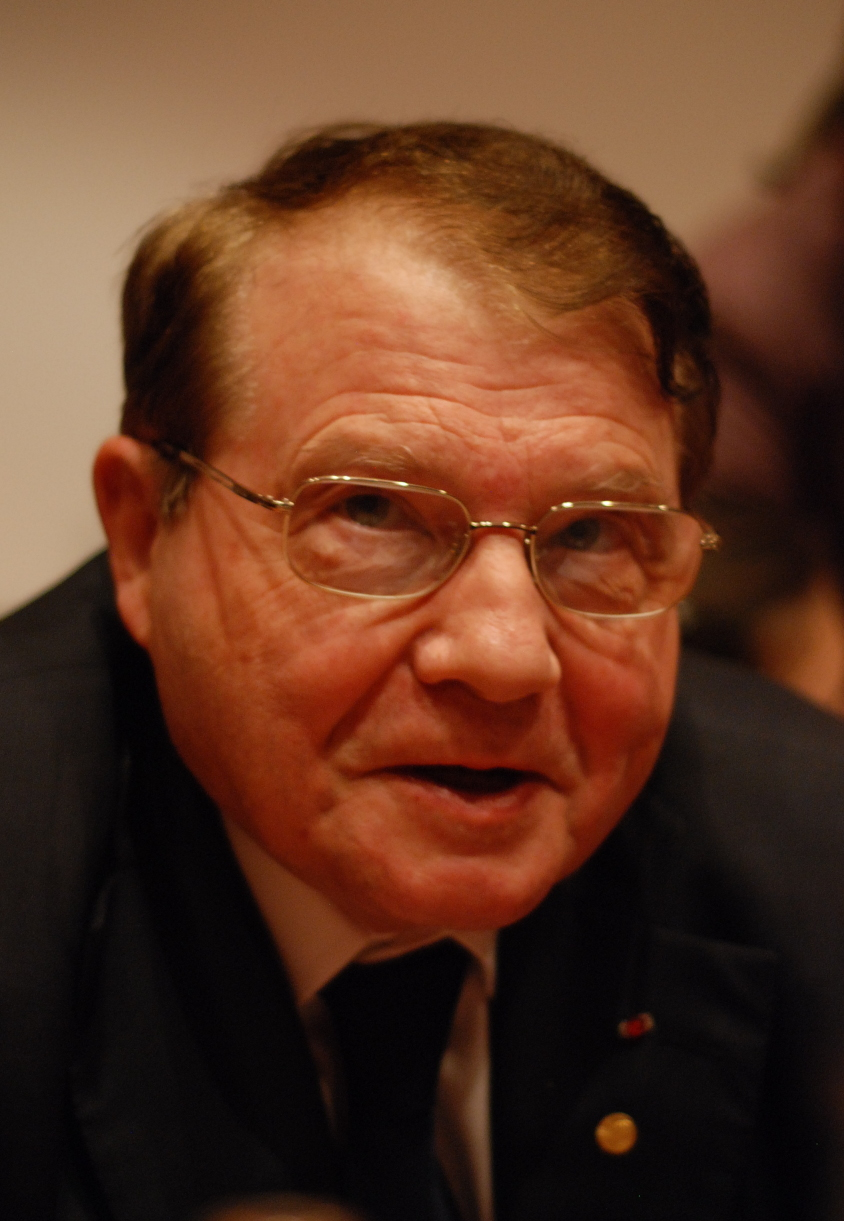
- Montagnier in 2008
- Born: 18 August 1932; Chabris, Indre, France
- Died: 8 February 2022 (aged 89); Neuilly-sur-Seine, France
- Education: University of Poitiers; University of Paris
- Known for: Co-discoverer of HIV
- Awards: 1986 Louis-Jeantet Prize for Medicine; 1988 Japan Prize; 2008 Nobel Prize in Physiology or Medicine
- Scientific career
- Fields: Virology
- Workplaces: Pasteur Institute; Shanghai Jiao Tong University

Luc Montagnier (US: /ˌmɒntənˈjeɪ, ˌmoʊntɑːnˈjeɪ/ MON-tən-YAY, MOHN-tahn-YAY, French: [lyk mɔ̃taɲe]; 18 August 1932 – 8 February 2022) was a French virologist and joint recipient, with Françoise Barré-Sinoussi and Harald zur Hausen, of the 2008 Nobel Prize in Physiology or Medicine for his discovery of the human immunodeficiency virus (HIV). He worked as a researcher at the Pasteur Institute in Paris and as a full-time professor at Shanghai Jiao Tong University in China.

In 2017, Montagnier was criticised by other academics for using his Nobel prize status to "spread dangerous health messages outside of his field of knowledge". During the COVID-19 pandemic, Montagnier promoted the lab-leak theory that SARS-CoV-2, the causative virus, was deliberately created and escaped from a laboratory. Such a claim has been rejected by other virologists.

== Early life and education ==
Montagnier was born in Chabris in central France. Montagnier became interested in science as a teenager. He studied science at the University of Poitiers, France, and then became an assistant in the Faculty of Sciences at Sorbonne University, where he obtained a PhD.

== Career ==
In 1960, Montagnier moved to Carshalton, UK as a postdoctoral fellow at the now defunct Virus Research Unit of the Medical Research Council (United Kingdom). In 1963, he moved to the Glasgow Institute of Virology. He developed a soft agar culture medium to culture viruses.

From 1965 until 1972 he was Laboratory Chief at the Institut Curie, then moved to the Institut Pasteur working on the effects of interferon on viruses.

=== Discovery of HIV ===
In 1982, Willy Rozenbaum, a clinician at the Hôpital Bichat hospital in Paris, asked Montagnier for assistance in establishing the cause of a mysterious new syndrome, AIDS (known at the time as "gay-related immune deficiency" or GRID). Rozenbaum had suggested at scientific meetings that the cause of the disease might be a retrovirus. Montagnier and members of his group at the Pasteur Institute, notably including Françoise Barré-Sinoussi and Jean-Claude Chermann, had extensive experience with retroviruses. Montagnier and his team examined samples taken from Rozenbaum's AIDS patients in 1983 and found the virus that would later become known as HIV in a lymph node biopsy. They named it "lymphadenopathy-associated virus", or LAV, since it was not then clear that it was the cause of AIDS, and published their findings in the journal Science on 20 May 1983.

A team led by Robert Gallo of the United States published similar findings in the same issue of Science and later confirmed the discovery of the virus and presented evidence that it caused AIDS. Gallo called the virus "human T-lymphotropic virus type III" (HTLV-III) because of perceived similarities with HTLV-I and -II, which had previously been discovered in his lab. Because of the timing of the discoveries, whether Montagnier's or Gallo's group was first to isolate HIV was for many years the subject of an acrimonious dispute. HIV isolates usually have a high degree of variability because the virus mutates rapidly. In comparison, the first two-human immunodeficiency virus type 1 (HIV-1) isolates, Lai/LAV (formerly LAV, isolated at the Pasteur Institute) and Lai/IIIB (formerly HTLV-IIIB, isolated from a pooled culture at the Laboratory of Tumor Cell Biology (LTCB) of the National Cancer Institute) were strikingly similar in sequence, suggesting that the two isolates were in fact the same, and likely from the same source.

In November 1990, the Office of Scientific Integrity at the National Institutes of Health attempted to clear up the matter by commissioning a group at Roche to analyze archival samples established at the Pasteur Institute and the Laboratory of Tumor Cell Biology (LTCB) of the National Cancer Institute between 1983 and 1985. The group, led by American epidemiologist Sheng-Yung Chang, examined archival specimens and concluded in Nature in 1993 that the American sample in fact originated from the French lab.

Chang determined that the French group's LAV was a virus from one patient that had contaminated a culture from another. On request, Montagnier's group had sent a sample of this culture to Gallo, not knowing it contained two viruses. It then contaminated the pooled culture on which Gallo was working.

Before the 1993 publication of Chang's results, Gallo's lab was accused and initially found guilty of "minor misconduct" by the Office of Scientific Integrity in 1991, and then by the newly created Office of Research Integrity in 1992 for the misappropriation of a sample of HIV produced at the Pasteur Institute. The subsequent publication in 1993 of Chang's investigation cleared Gallo's lab of the charges, although his reputation had already been tainted by the accusations.

Today it is agreed that Montagnier's group first isolated HIV, but Gallo's group is credited with discovering that the virus causes AIDS and with generating much of the science that made the discovery possible, including a technique previously developed by Gallo's lab for growing T cells in the laboratory. When Montagnier's group first published their discovery, they said HIV's role in causing AIDS "remains to be determined."

The question of whether the true discoverers of the virus were French or American was more than a matter of prestige. A US government patent for the AIDS test, filed by the United States Department of Health and Human Services and based on what was claimed to be Gallo's identification of the virus, was at stake. In 1987, both governments attempted to end the dispute by arranging to split the prestige of the discovery and the proceeds from the patent 50–50, naming Montagnier and Gallo co-discoverers. The two scientists continued to dispute each other's claims until 1987.

It was not until French President François Mitterrand and American President Ronald Reagan met in person that the major issues were ironed out. The scientists finally agreed to share credit for the discovery of HIV, and in 1986, both the French and the US names (LAV and HTLV-III) were dropped in favor of the new term human immunodeficiency virus (virus de l'immunodéficience humaine, abbreviated HIV or VIH) (Coffin, 1986). They concluded that the origin of the HIV-1 Lai/IIIB isolate discovered by Gallo was the same as that discovered by Montagnier (but not known by Montagnier to cause AIDS). This compromise allowed Montagnier and Gallo to end their feud and collaborate with each other again, writing a chronology that appeared in Nature that year.

On 29 November 2002 issue of Science, Gallo and Montagnier published a series of articles, one of which was co-written by both scientists, in which they acknowledged the pivotal roles that each had played in the discovery of HIV.

== Personal life and death ==
In 1961, Montagnier married Dorothea Ackerman, and they had three children. He died in Neuilly-sur-Seine on 8 February 2022, at the age of 89.

== Awards and honors ==
The 2008 Nobel Prize in Physiology or Medicine was awarded to Montagnier and Françoise Barré-Sinoussi for the discovery of HIV. They shared the Prize with Harald zur Hausen, who discovered that human papilloma viruses can cause cervical cancer. Montagnier said he was "surprised" that Robert Gallo was not also recognized by the Nobel Committee: "It was important to prove that HIV was the cause of AIDS, and Gallo had a very important role in that. I'm very sorry for Robert Gallo." According to Maria Masucci, a member of the Nobel Assembly, "there was no doubt as to who made the fundamental discoveries."

Montagnier was the co-founder of the World Foundation for AIDS Research and Prevention and co-directed the Program for International Viral Collaboration. He was the founder and a former president of the Houston-based World Foundation for Medical Research and Prevention. He received more than 20 major awards, including the National Order of Merit (Commander, 1986) and the Légion d'honneur (Knight: 1984; Officer: 1990; Commander: 1993; Grand Officer: 2009), He was a recipient of the Lasker Award and the Scheele Award (1986), the Louis-Jeantet Prize for medicine (1986), the Gairdner Award (1987), the Golden Plate Award of the American Academy of Achievement (1987), King Faisal International Prize (1993) (known as the Arab Nobel Prize), and the Prince of Asturias Award (2000). He was also a member of the Académie Nationale de Médecine, and was awarded the honorary Doctor of Humane Letters (L.H.D.) from Whittier College in 2010.

== Controversies ==
=== Electromagnetic signals from DNA ===
In 2009, Montagnier published two controversial independent research studies, one of which was entitled "Electromagnetic Signals Are Produced by Aqueous Nanostructures Derived from Bacterial DNA Sequences". Jeff Reimers, of the University of Sydney, said that if its conclusions are true, "these would be the most significant experiments performed in the past 90 years, demanding re-evaluation of the whole conceptual framework of modern chemistry". The paper concluded that diluted DNA from pathogenic bacterial and viral species was able to emit "specific radio waves" and that "these radio waves [are] associated with 'nanostructures' in the solution that might be able to recreate the pathogen".

They were published in a new journal, of which he was chair of the editorial board, allegedly detecting electromagnetic signals from bacterial DNA (M. pirum and E. coli) in water that had been prepared using agitation and high dilutions, and similar research on electromagnetic detection of HIV RNA in the blood of AIDS patients treated by antiretroviral therapy.

=== Homeopathy ===
On 28 June 2010, Montagnier spoke at the Lindau Nobel Laureate Meeting in Germany, "where 60 Nobel prize winners had gathered, along with 700 other scientists, to discuss the latest breakthroughs in medicine, chemistry and physics." He "stunned his colleagues ... when he presented a new method for detecting viral infections that bore close parallels to the basic tenets of homeopathy. Although fellow Nobel prize winners – who view homeopathy as quackery – were left openly shaking their heads, Montagnier's comments were rapidly embraced by homeopaths eager for greater credibility. Cristal Sumner, of the British Homeopathic Association, said Montagnier's work gave homeopathy 'a true scientific ethos'."

When asked by Canada's CBC Marketplace program if his work was indeed a theoretical basis for homeopathy as homeopaths had claimed, Montagnier replied that one "cannot extrapolate it to the products used in homeopathy".

==== Responses, criticisms, and interviews ====
The homeopathy paper met with harsh criticism for not being peer-reviewed, and its claims unsubstantiated by modern mainstream conventions of physics and chemistry. In response to Montagnier's statement that the generally unfavorable response is due to the "non-understanding or misunderstanding of the breakthrough findings", blogger Andy Lewis has written that he has found it difficult to assert what the paper "actually claims", saying: "The paper ... lacks any rigour. ... important experimental steps are described dismissively in a sentence and little attempt is made to describe the detail of the work". While homeopaths claim his research as support for homeopathy, many scientists have greeted it with scorn and harsh criticism.

In a 24 December 2010 Science magazine interview entitled "French Nobelist Escapes 'Intellectual Terror' to Pursue Radical Ideas in China", he was questioned about his research and plans. In the interview he stated that Jacques Benveniste, whose controversial homeopathic work had been discredited, was "a modern Galileo". When asked if he was not "worried that your colleagues will think you have drifted into pseudo-science", he replied: "No, because it's not pseudoscience. It's not quackery. These are real phenomena which deserve further study." He also mentioned that his applications for funding had been turned down and that he was leaving his home country to set up shop in China so he could escape what he called the "intellectual terror" which he claimed had prevented others from publishing their results. He stated that China's Shanghai Jiao Tong University is more "open minded" to his research. There he was chairman of the editorial board of a new journal which published his research, Interdisciplinary Sciences: Computational Life Sciences.

Montagnier was also questioned on his beliefs about homeopathy, to which he replied: "I can't say that homeopathy is right in everything. What I can say now is that the high dilutions are right. High dilutions of something are not nothing. They are water structures which mimic the original molecules. We find that with DNA, we cannot work at the extremely high dilutions used in homeopathy; we cannot go further than a 10^{−18} dilution, or we lose the signal. But even at 10^{−18}, you can calculate that there is not a single molecule of DNA left. And yet we detect a signal."

A 12 January 2011 New Scientist editorial described the controversial nature of the research, while also noting how many researchers "reacted with disbelief", with chemist and university president Gary Schuster comparing it to "pathological science". Evolutionary biologist PZ Myers also described the work as "pathological science". He described the paper as "one of the more unprofessional write-ups I've ever run across", and criticized the publication process as having an "unbelievable turnaround" time: "another suspicious sign are the dates. This paper was submitted on 3 January 2009, revised on 5 January 2009, and accepted on 6 January 2009", leading him to ask: "Who reviewed this, the author's mother? Maybe someone even closer. Guess who the chairman of the editorial board is: Luc Montagnier."

On 25 May 2012, he gave the keynote address at the 2012 conference for AutismOne, an anti-vaccination group. Similar to the controversy he aroused by extolling homeopathy, his latest group, Chronimed, claimed to have made a discovery for autistic children that was sharply criticized by computational biologist Steven Salzberg.

In 2017, 106 academic scientists wrote an open letter "calling [Montagnier] to order". The letter read: "We, academics of medicine, cannot accept that one of our peers is using his Nobel prize [status] to spread dangerous health messages outside of his field of knowledge."

=== COVID-19 pandemic ===
In 2020, Montagnier argued that SARS-CoV-2, the virus that causes COVID-19, was man-made in a laboratory and that it might have been the result of an attempt to create a vaccine for HIV/AIDS. His allegation came after the United States had launched a probe into whether the virus came from a laboratory. According to Montagnier, the "presence of elements of HIV and germ of malaria in the genome of coronavirus is highly suspect and the characteristics of the virus could not have arisen naturally." Montagnier's conclusions were rejected as hasty by the scientific community, considering the gene sequences were common among similar organisms; no evidence arose that SARS-CoV-2 was genetically engineered. Bioinformatics analyses show that the common sequences are short, that their similarity is insufficient to support the hypothesis of common origin, and that the identified sequences were independent insertions which occurred at varied points during the evolution of coronaviruses.

In a 2021 interview with the French media group "Hold Up", Montagnier claimed that the use of vaccinations for COVID was steering the evolution of new strains, and that the process of antibody-dependent enhancement (ADE) would cause vaccinated individuals to suffer more strongly. The former claim had no obvious basis in fact, while ADE had only ever been conclusively demonstrated for dengue virus infections, and not for COVID-19.

For his defense of such anti-scientific views, Montagnier has been cited as an example of the phenomenon called Nobel disease.

== See also ==
- And the Band Played On, a book written about the discovery of AIDS
  - And the Band Played On, a film based on the book
- History of RNA biology
- HIV trial in Libya
- List of RNA biologists
