= Chabris =

- Commune
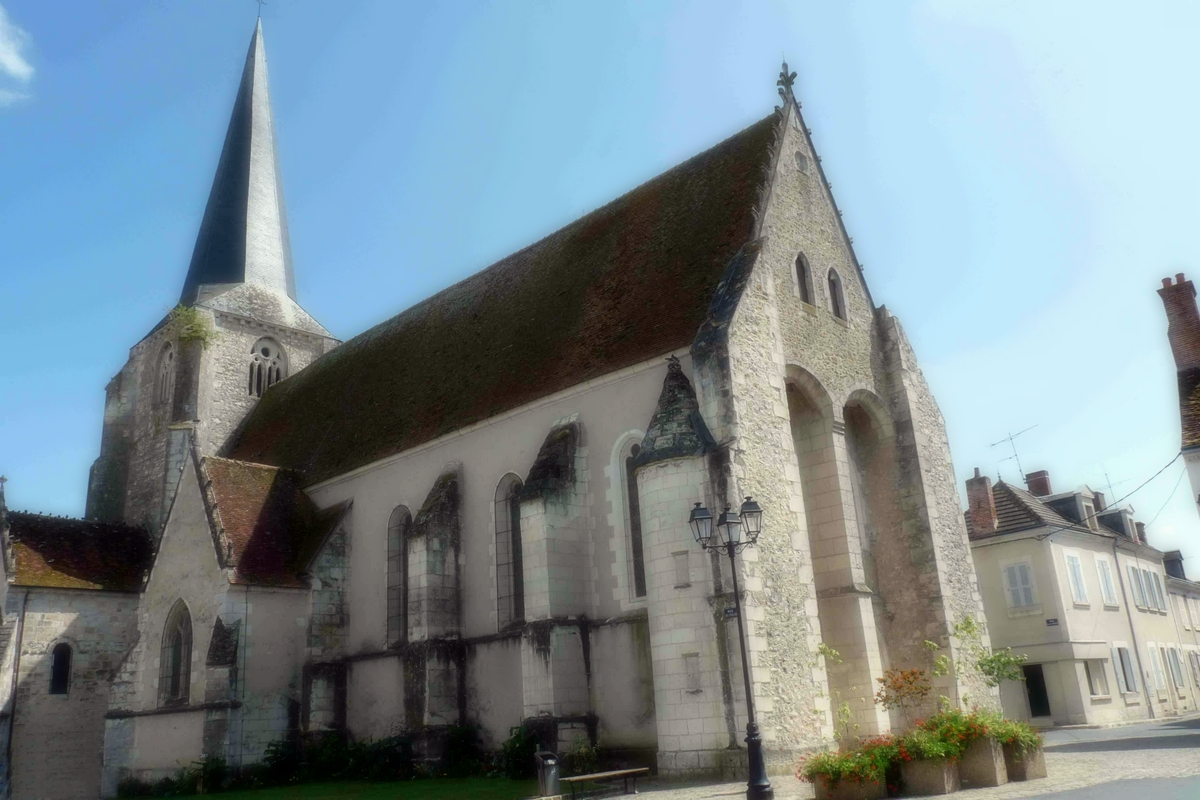
- The church of Saint-Christophe-et-Saint-Phalier, in Chabris

- Coat of arms
- Location of Chabris
- Location within France Location within Centre-Val de Loire
- Coordinates: 47°15′20″N 1°39′15″E
- Country: France
- Region: Centre-Val de Loire
- Department: Indre
- Arrondissement: Issoudun
- Canton: Valençay
- Intercommunality: Chabris - Pays de Bazelle

Government
  - Mayor (2020–2026): Fabrice Vaury
- Area^{1}: 41.22 km^{2} (15.92 sq mi)
- Elevation: 80 m (260 ft)
- Highest elevation: 134 m (440 ft)
- Lowest elevation: 72 m (236 ft)
- Population (2023): 2,740
  - Density: 66.5/km^{2} (172/sq mi)
- Time zone: UTC+01:00 (CET)
  - Summer (DST): UTC+02:00 (CEST)
- INSEE/Postal code: 36034 /36210
- ^{1} French Land Register data, which excludes lakes, ponds, glaciers > 1 km^{2} (0.386 sq mi or 247 acres) and river estuaries.

Chabris (French pronunciation: [ʃabʁi]) is a commune in the Indre department in central France.

Located at an important river crossing-place on the road from Valençay to Romorantin with a bridge since Roman times, Chabris was once the site of the ancient Bishop of Bourges's feudal fortress. Its church was built over the tomb of the 6th century hermit Saint Phalier. There is a twinning with Lonsee, in Germany.

== Population ==
Historical population

Year	Pop.	±% p.a.
1793	1,937	—
1800	1,923	−0.10%
1806	2,055	+1.11%
1821	2,236	+0.56%
1831	2,511	+1.17%
1836	2,563	+0.41%
1841	2,530	−0.26%
1846	2,781	+1.91%
1851	2,872	+0.65%
1856	2,958	+0.59%
1861	3,030	+0.48%
1866	3,111	+0.53%
1872	3,116	+0.03%
1876	3,044	−0.58%
1881	3,043	−0.01%
1886	3,026	−0.11%
1891	2,927	−0.66%
1896	2,836	−0.63%
1901	2,780	−0.40%

Year	Pop.	±% p.a.
1906	2,792	+0.09%
1911	2,737	−0.40%
1921	2,552	−0.70%
1926	2,441	−0.89%
1931	2,372	−0.57%
1936	2,437	+0.54%
1946	2,385	−0.22%
1954	2,358	−0.14%
1962	2,391	+0.17%
1968	2,493	+0.70%
1975	2,493	+0.00%
1982	2,589	+0.54%
1990	2,672	+0.40%
1999	2,652	−0.08%
2007	2,749	+0.45%
2012	2,759	+0.07%
2017	2,750	−0.07%
2023	2,740	−0.06%

Source: EHESS and INSEE (1968-2023)

== Personalities ==
- Luc Montagnier was born in Chabris on 18 August 1932, French virologist and co-recipient of the 2008 Nobel Prize in Physiology or Medicine for his discovery of HIV.

== See also ==
- Communes of the Indre department
