= Thomas Cech =

American biochemist

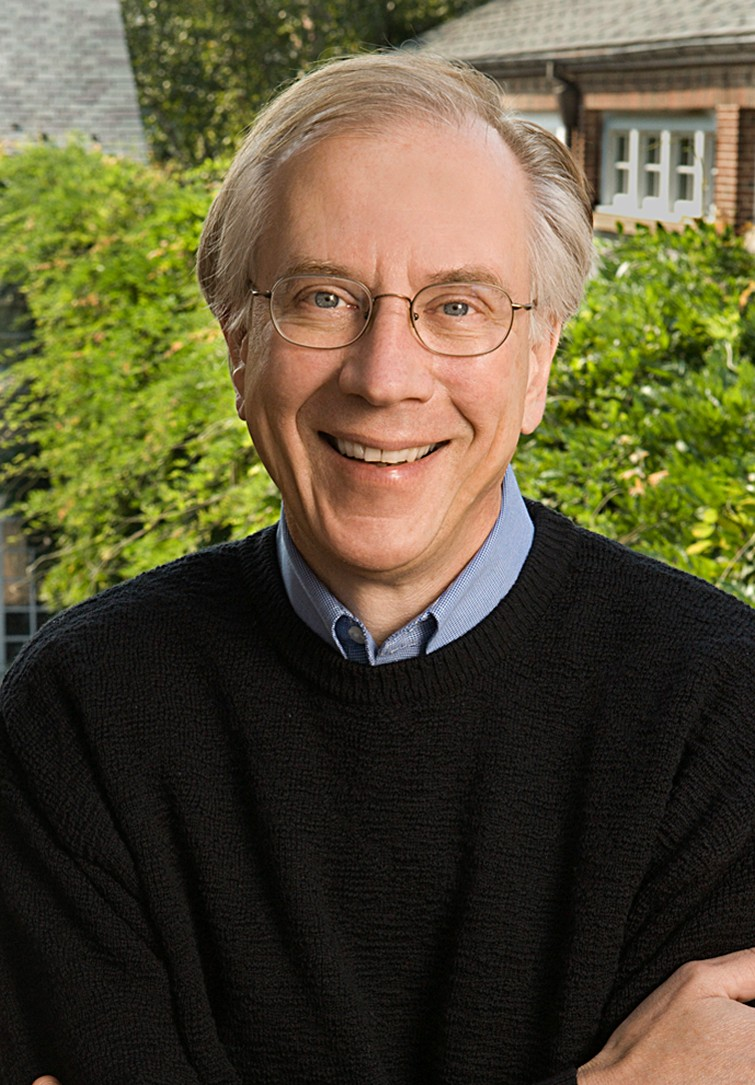
- Cech in 2005
- Born: December 8, 1947 (age 78); Chicago, Illinois, US
- Education: Grinnell College (B.A., 1970); University of California, Berkeley (Ph.D., 1975)
- Known for: Ribozyme, Telomerase
- Awards: Pfizer Award in Enzyme Chemistry (1985); Newcomb Cleveland Prize (1986); NAS Award in Molecular Biology (1987); Louisa Gross Horwitz Prize (1988); Rosenstiel Award (1988); Nobel Prize in Chemistry (1989); National Medal of Science (1995); Othmer Gold Medal (2007)
- Scientific career
- Workplaces: University of Colorado, Howard Hughes Medical Institute
- Thesis: Characterization of the most rapidly renaturing sequences in the main band DNA of the mouse (Mus musculus) (1975)
- Doctoral advisor: John E. Hearst

Thomas Robert Cech (Note: Pronounced "check") (born 8 December 1947) is an American chemist who shared the 1989 Nobel Prize in Chemistry with Sidney Altman “for their discovery of catalytic properties of RNA.”

Cech discovered that RNA could itself cut strands of RNA, suggesting that life might have started as RNA. He found that RNA can not only transmit instructions, but can act as a catalyst to speed up the necessary reactions.

He has also studied telomeres, and his lab discovered an enzyme, TERT (telomerase reverse transcriptase), which is part of the process of restoring telomeres after they are shortened during cell division.

As president of Howard Hughes Medical Institute (2000–2008) he promoted science education, and he teaches an undergraduate chemistry course at the University of Colorado.

== Early life and career ==
Cech was born to parents of Czech origin (his grandfather was Czech, his other grandparents were first-generation Americans) in Chicago. He grew up in Iowa City, Iowa. In junior high school, he knocked on the doors of geology professors at the University of Iowa, and asked them to discuss crystal structures, meteorites and fossils.

A National Merit Scholar, Cech entered Grinnell College in 1966. There he studied Homer's Odyssey, Dante's Inferno, constitutional history and chemistry. He married his organic chemistry lab partner, Carol Lynn Martinson, and graduated with a B.A. in 1970.

In 1975, Cech completed his PhD in chemistry at the University of California, Berkeley and in the same year, he entered the Massachusetts Institute of Technology where he engaged in postdoctoral research. In 1978, he obtained his first faculty position at the University of Colorado where he lectured undergraduate students in chemistry and biochemistry, and where he remains on the faculty, currently as distinguished professor in the department of biochemistry. In 2000, Cech succeeded Purnell Choppin as president of the Howard Hughes Medical Institute in Maryland. He also continued to head his biochemistry laboratory at the University of Colorado, Boulder. On April 1, 2008, Cech announced that he would step down as the president of HHMI, to return to teaching and research, in spring 2009. Returning to Boulder, Cech became the first executive director of the BioFrontiers Institute, a position he held until 2020. He also taught general chemistry to freshmen.

Cech is the author of The Catalyst: RNA and the Quest to Unlock Life’s Deepest Secrets, published in June 2024.

== Research ==
Cech's main research area is that of the process of transcription in the nucleus of cells. He studies how the genetic code of DNA is transcribed into RNA. In the 1970s, Cech had been studying the splicing of RNA in the unicellular organism Tetrahymena thermophila when he discovered that an unprocessed RNA molecule could splice itself. In 1982, Cech became the first to show that RNA molecules are not restricted to being passive carriers of genetic information – they can have catalytic functions and can participate in cellular reactions. RNA-processing reactions and protein synthesis on ribosomes in particular are catalysed by RNA. RNA enzymes are known as ribozymes and have provided a new tool for gene technology. They also have the potential to provide new therapeutic agents – for example, they have the ability to destroy and cleave invading, viral RNAs.

Cech's second area of research is on telomeres, the structure that protects the ends of chromosomes. Telomeres are shortened with every duplication of DNA, and must be lengthened again. He studies telomerase, the enzyme that copies the telomeric sequences and lengthens them. The active site protein subunits of telomerase comprise a new class of reverse transcriptases, enzymes previously thought to be restricted to viruses and transposable elements. Telomerase is activated in 90% of human cancers. Therefore, a drug that would inhibit its activity could be useful in treating cancer.

== Awards ==
Cech's work has been recognised by many awards and prizes including: lifetime professorship by the American Cancer Society (1987), the Louisa Gross Horwitz Prize from Columbia University (1988), the Heineken Prize of the Royal Netherlands Academy of Sciences (1988), the Albert Lasker Basic Medical Research Award (1988), the Nobel Prize in Chemistry (1989, shared with Sidney Altman), the Golden Plate Award of the American Academy of Achievement in 1990 and the National Medal of Science (1995). In 1987, Cech was elected to the United States National Academy of Sciences and in 1988 he was elected to the American Academy of Arts and Sciences. Cech was elected to the American Philosophical Society in 2001. In 2003, Cech gave the University of Colorado's George Gamow Memorial Lecture. In 2007, he received the Othmer Gold Medal for outstanding contributions to progress in chemistry and science.

== See also ==
- History of RNA biology
- List of RNA biologists
