= RNA =

Family of large biological molecules

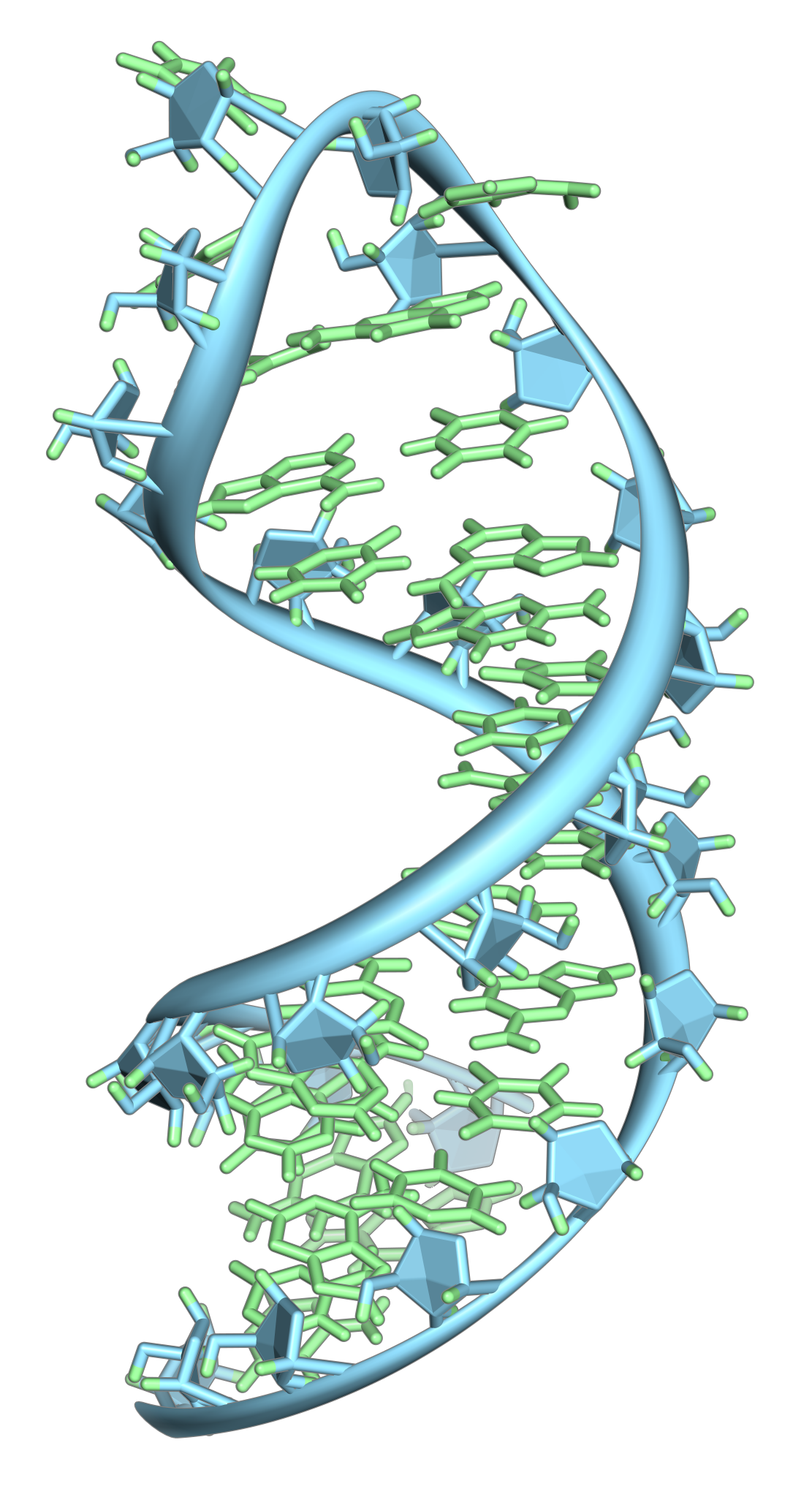
A hairpin loop from a pre-mRNA. Highlighted are the nucleobases (green) and the ribose-phosphate backbone (blue). This is a single strand of RNA that folds back upon itself.

Ribonucleic acid (RNA) is a polymeric molecule that is essential for most biological functions, either by performing the function itself (non-coding RNA) or by forming a template for the production of proteins (messenger RNA). RNA and deoxyribonucleic acid (DNA) are nucleic acids. The nucleic acids constitute one of the four major macromolecules essential for all known forms of life. RNA is assembled as a chain of nucleotides. Cellular organisms use messenger RNA (mRNA) to convey genetic information (using the nitrogenous bases of guanine, uracil, adenine, and cytosine, denoted by the letters G, U, A, and C) that directs synthesis of specific proteins. Many viruses encode their genetic information using an RNA genome.

Some RNA molecules play an active role within cells by catalyzing biological reactions, controlling gene expression, or sensing and communicating responses to cellular signals. One of these active processes is protein synthesis, a universal function in which RNA molecules direct the synthesis of proteins on ribosomes. This process uses transfer RNA (tRNA) molecules to deliver amino acids to the ribosome, where ribosomal RNA (rRNA) then links amino acids together to form coded proteins.

It has become widely accepted in science that early in the history of life on Earth, prior to the evolution of DNA and possibly of protein-based enzymes as well, an "RNA world" existed in which RNA served as both living organisms' storage method for genetic information—a role fulfilled today by DNA, except in the case of RNA viruses—and potentially performed catalytic functions in cells—a function performed today by protein enzymes, with the notable and important exception of the ribosome, which is a ribozyme.

== Chemical structure of RNA ==
=== Basic chemical composition ===
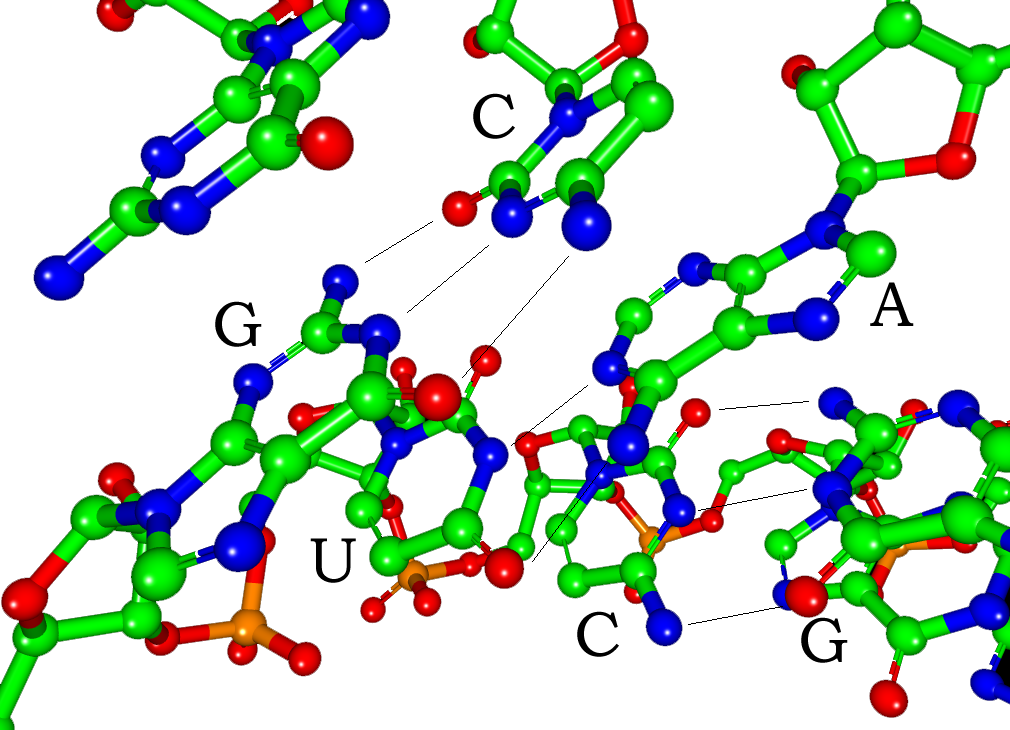
Watson-Crick base pairs in a siRNA. Hydrogen atoms are not shown.

Each nucleotide in RNA contains a ribose sugar, with carbons numbered 1' through 5'. A base is attached to the 1' position, in general, adenine (A), cytosine (C), guanine (G), or uracil (U). Adenine and guanine are purines, and cytosine and uracil are pyrimidines. A phosphate group is attached to the 3' position of one ribose and the 5' position of the next. The phosphate groups have a negative charge each, making RNA a charged molecule (polyanion). The bases form standard hydrogen bonds between cytosine and guanine and between adenine and uracil, while guanine and uracil can pair through a non-canonical G–U wobble base pair. However, other interactions are possible, such as a group of adenine bases binding to each other in a bulge, or the GNRA tetraloop that has a guanine–adenine base-pair.

=== Differences between DNA and RNA ===
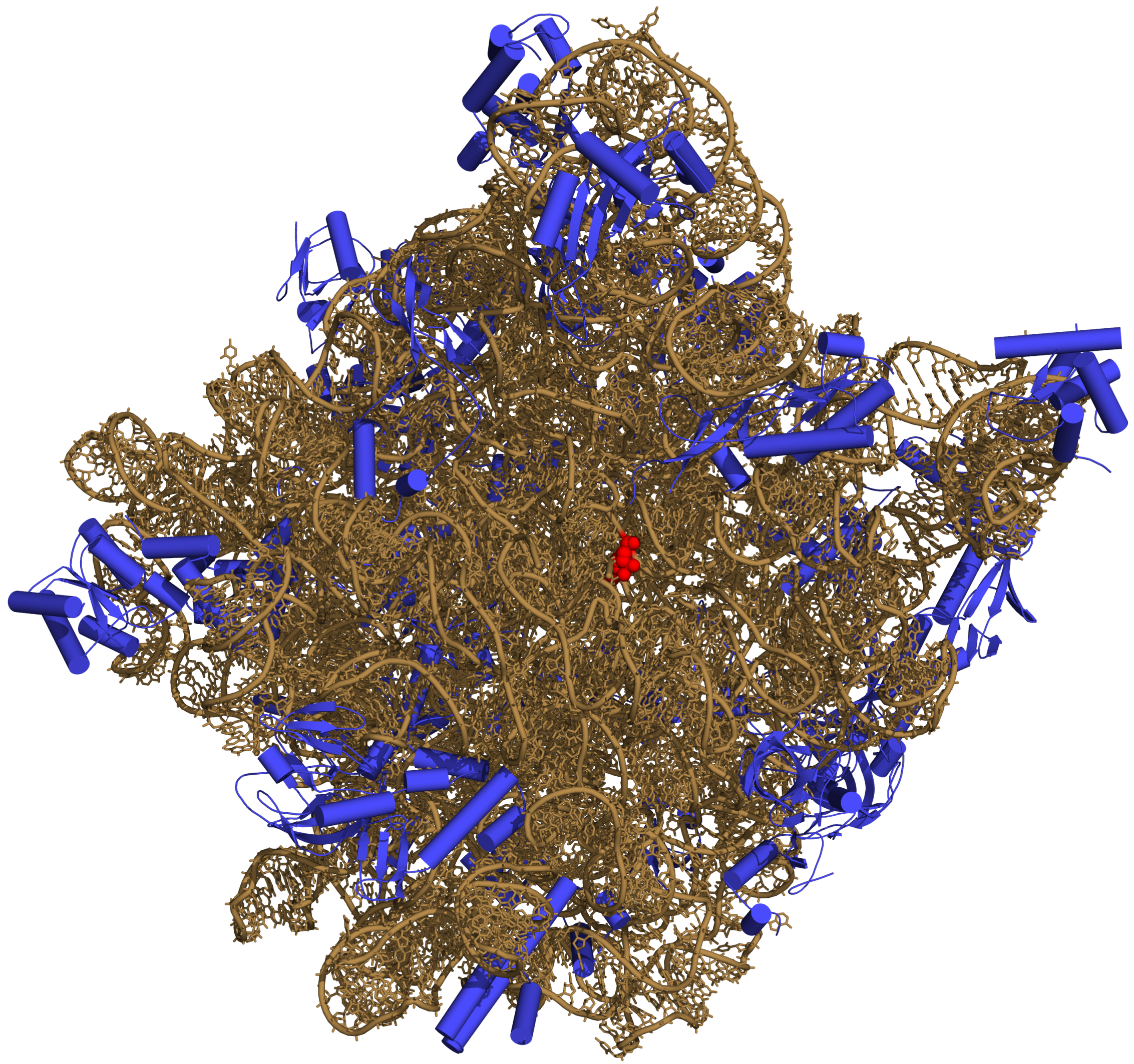
Three-dimensional representation of the 50S ribosomal subunit. Ribosomal RNA is in brown, proteins in blue. The active site is a small segment of rRNA, indicated in red.

The chemical structure of RNA is very similar to that of DNA, but differs in three primary ways:

- Unlike double-stranded DNA, RNA is usually a single-stranded molecule (ssRNA) in many of its biological roles and consists of much shorter chains of nucleotides. However, double-stranded RNA (dsRNA) can form and (moreover) a single RNA molecule can, by complementary base pairing, form intrastrand double helixes, as in tRNA.
- While the sugar-phosphate "backbone" of DNA contains deoxyribose, RNA contains ribose instead. Ribose has a hydroxyl group attached to the pentose ring in the 2' position, whereas deoxyribose does not. The hydroxyl groups in the ribose backbone make RNA more chemically labile than DNA by lowering the activation energy of hydrolysis.
- The complementary base to adenine in DNA is thymine, whereas in RNA, it is uracil, which is an unmethylated form of thymine.

Like DNA, most biologically active RNAs, including mRNA, tRNA, rRNA, snRNAs, and other non-coding RNAs, contain self-complementary sequences that allow parts of the RNA to fold and pair with itself to form double helices. Analysis of these RNAs has revealed that they are highly structured. Unlike DNA, their structures do not consist of long double helices, but rather collections of short helices packed together into structures akin to proteins.

In this fashion, RNAs can achieve chemical catalysis (like enzymes). For instance, determination of the structure of the ribosome—an RNA-protein complex that catalyzes the assembly of proteins—revealed that its active site is composed entirely of RNA.

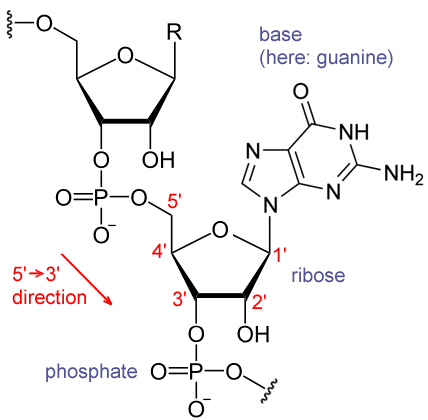
Structure of a fragment of an RNA, showing a guanosyl subunit

An important structural component of RNA that distinguishes it from DNA is the presence of a hydroxyl group at the 2' position of the ribose sugar. The presence of this functional group causes the helix to mostly take the A-form geometry, although in single strand dinucleotide contexts, RNA can rarely also adopt the B-form most commonly observed in DNA. The A-form geometry results in a very deep and narrow major groove and a shallow and wide minor groove. A second consequence of the presence of the 2'-hydroxyl group is that in conformationally flexible regions of an RNA molecule (that is, not involved in formation of a double helix), it can chemically attack the adjacent phosphodiester bond to cleave the backbone.

=== Secondary and tertiary structures ===
The functional form of single-stranded RNA molecules, just like proteins, frequently requires a specific spatial tertiary structure. The scaffold for this structure is provided by secondary structural elements that are hydrogen bonds within the molecule. This leads to several recognizable "domains" of secondary structure like hairpin loops, bulges, and internal loops. In order to create, i.e., design, RNA for any given secondary structure, two or three bases would not be enough, but four bases are enough. This is likely why nature has "chosen" a four base alphabet: fewer than four would not allow the creation of all structures, while more than four bases are not necessary to do so. Since RNA is charged, metal ions such as Mg^{2+} are needed to stabilise many secondary and tertiary structures.

The naturally occurring enantiomer of RNA is D-RNA composed of D-ribonucleotides. All chirality centers are located in the D-ribose. By the use of L-ribose or rather L-ribonucleotides, L-RNA can be synthesized. L-RNA is much more stable against degradation by RNase.

Like other structured biopolymers such as proteins, one can define topology of a folded RNA molecule. This is often done based on arrangement of intra-chain contacts within a folded RNA, termed as circuit topology.

=== Chemical modifications ===
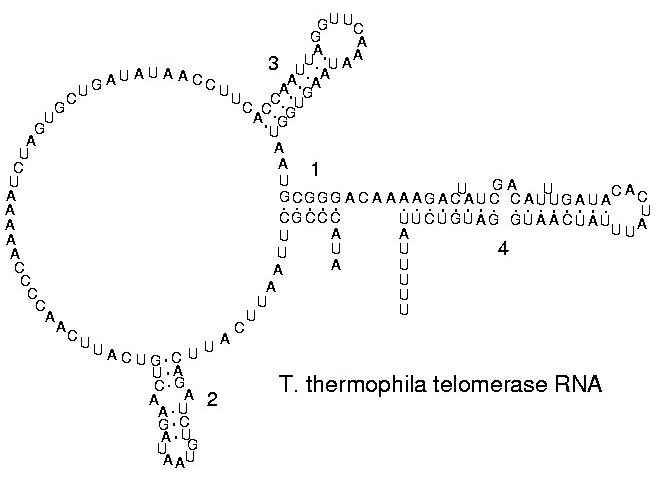
Secondary structure of a telomerase RNA

RNA is transcribed with only four bases (adenine, cytosine, guanine and uracil), but these bases and attached sugars can be modified in numerous ways as the RNAs mature. Pseudouridine (Ψ), in which the linkage between uracil and ribose is changed from a C–N bond to a C–C bond, and ribothymidine (T) are found in various places (the most notable ones being in the TΨC loop of tRNA). Another notable modified base is hypoxanthine, a deaminated adenine base whose nucleoside is called inosine (I). Inosine plays a key role in the wobble hypothesis of the genetic code.

There are more than 100 other naturally occurring modified nucleosides. The greatest structural diversity of modifications can be found in tRNA, while pseudouridine and nucleosides with 2'-O-methylribose often present in rRNA are the most common. The specific roles of many of these modifications in RNA are not fully understood. However, it is notable that, in ribosomal RNA, many of the post-transcriptional modifications occur in highly functional regions, such as the peptidyl transferase center and the subunit interface, implying that they are important for normal function.

== Types of RNA ==
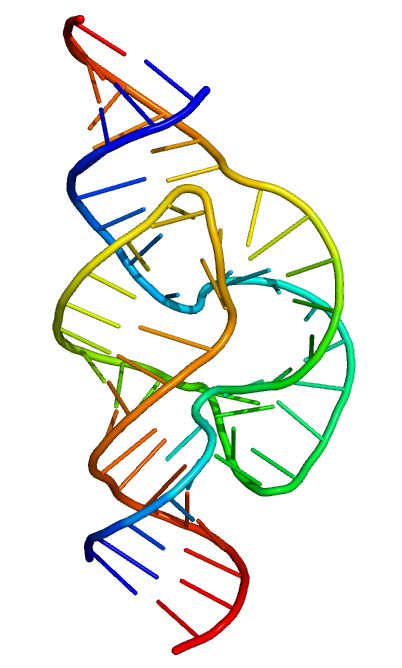
Structure of a hammerhead ribozyme, a ribozyme that cuts RNA

Messenger RNA (mRNA) is the type of RNA that carries information from DNA to the ribosome, the sites of protein synthesis (translation) in the cell cytoplasm. The coding sequence of the mRNA determines the amino acid sequence in the protein that is produced. However, many RNAs do not code for protein (about 97% of the transcriptional output is non-protein-coding in eukaryotes).

These so-called non-coding RNAs ("ncRNA") can be encoded by their own genes (RNA genes), but can also derive from mRNA introns. The most prominent examples of non-coding RNAs are transfer RNA (tRNA) and ribosomal RNA (rRNA), both of which are involved in the process of translation. There are also non-coding RNAs involved in gene regulation, RNA processing and other roles. Certain RNAs are able to catalyse chemical reactions such as cutting and ligating other RNA molecules, and the catalysis of peptide bond formation in the ribosome; these are known as ribozymes.

According to the length of RNA chain, RNA includes small RNA and long RNA. Usually, small RNAs are shorter than 200 nt in length, and long RNAs are greater than 200 nt long. Long RNAs, also called large RNAs, mainly include long non-coding RNA (lncRNA) and mRNA. Small RNAs mainly include 5.8S ribosomal RNA (rRNA), 5S rRNA, transfer RNA (tRNA), microRNA (miRNA), small interfering RNA (siRNA), small nucleolar RNA (snoRNAs), Piwi-interacting RNA (piRNA), tRNA-derived small RNA (tsRNA) and small rDNA-derived RNA (srRNA). There are certain exceptions as in the case of the 5S rRNA of the members of the genus Halococcus (Archaea), which have an insertion, thus increasing its size.

=== RNAs involved in protein synthesis ===
Messenger RNA (mRNA) carries information about a protein sequence to the ribosomes, the protein synthesis factories in the cell. It is coded so that every three nucleotides (a codon) corresponds to one amino acid. In eukaryotic cells, once precursor mRNA (pre-mRNA) has been transcribed from DNA, it is processed to mature mRNA. This removes its introns—non-coding sections of the pre-mRNA. The mRNA is then exported from the nucleus to the cytoplasm, where it is bound to ribosomes and translated into its corresponding protein form with the help of tRNA. In prokaryotic cells, which do not have nucleus and cytoplasm compartments, mRNA can bind to ribosomes while it is being transcribed from DNA. After a certain amount of time, the message degrades into its component nucleotides with the assistance of ribonucleases.

Transfer RNA (tRNA) is a small RNA chain of about 80 nucleotides that transfers a specific amino acid to a growing polypeptide chain at the ribosomal site of protein synthesis during translation. It has sites for amino acid attachment and an anticodon region for codon recognition that binds to a specific sequence on the messenger RNA chain through hydrogen bonding.

A diagram of how mRNA is used to create polypeptide chains

Ribosomal RNA (rRNA) is the catalytic component of the ribosomes. The rRNA is the component of the ribosome that hosts translation. Eukaryotic ribosomes contain four different rRNA molecules: 18S, 5.8S, 28S and 5S rRNA. Three of the rRNA molecules are synthesized in the nucleolus, and one is synthesized elsewhere. In the cytoplasm, ribosomal RNA and protein combine to form a nucleoprotein called a ribosome. The ribosome binds mRNA and carries out protein synthesis. Several ribosomes may be attached to a single mRNA at any time. Nearly all the RNA found in a typical eukaryotic cell is rRNA.

Transfer-messenger RNA (tmRNA) is found in many bacteria and plastids. It tags proteins encoded by mRNAs that lack stop codons for degradation and prevents the ribosome from stalling.

=== Regulatory RNA ===
The earliest known regulators of gene expression were proteins known as repressors and activators – regulators with specific short binding sites within enhancer regions near the genes to be regulated. Later studies have shown that RNAs also regulate genes. There are several kinds of RNA-dependent processes in eukaryotes regulating the expression of genes at various points, such as RNA interference repressing genes post-transcriptionally, long non-coding RNAs shutting down blocks of chromatin epigenetically, and enhancer RNAs inducing increased gene expression. Bacteria and archaea have also been shown to use regulatory RNA systems such as bacterial small RNAs and CRISPR. Fire and Mello were awarded the 2006 Nobel Prize in Physiology or Medicine for discovering microRNAs (miRNAs), specific short RNA molecules that can base-pair with mRNAs.

==== MicroRNA (miRNA) and small interfering RNA (siRNA) ====
Post-transcriptional expression levels of many genes can be controlled by RNA interference, in which miRNAs, specific short RNA molecules, pair with mRNA regions and target them for repression. RNA interference is carried out by the RNA-induced silencing complex, which uses a miRNA guide to regulate complementary mRNAs through base pairing interactions and results in either degradaing the mRNA or blocking its translation.

==== Long non-coding RNAs ====
Next to be linked to regulation were Xist and other long noncoding RNAs associated with X chromosome inactivation. Their roles, at first mysterious, were shown by Jeannie T. Lee and others to be the silencing of blocks of chromatin via recruitment of Polycomb complex so that messenger RNA could not be transcribed from them. Additional lncRNAs, currently defined as RNAs of more than 200 base pairs that do not appear to have coding potential, have been found associated with regulation of stem cell pluripotency and cell division.

==== Enhancer RNAs ====
The third major group of regulatory RNAs is called enhancer RNAs. It is not clear at present whether they are a unique category of RNAs of various lengths or constitute a distinct subset of lncRNAs. In any case, they are transcribed from enhancers, which are known regulatory sites in the DNA near genes they regulate. They up-regulate the transcription of the gene(s) under control of the enhancer from which they are transcribed.

=== Small RNA in prokaryotes ===
==== Small RNA ====
At first, regulatory RNA was thought to be a eukaryotic phenomenon, a part of the explanation for why so much more transcription in higher organisms was seen than had been predicted. But as soon as researchers began to look for possible RNA regulators in bacteria, they turned up there as well, termed as small RNA (sRNA). Currently, the ubiquitous nature of systems of RNA regulation of genes has been discussed as support for the RNA World theory. There are indications that the enterobacterial sRNAs are involved in various cellular processes and seem to have significant role in stress responses such as membrane stress, starvation stress, phosphosugar stress and DNA damage. Also, it has been suggested that sRNAs have been evolved to have important role in stress responses because of their kinetic properties that allow for rapid response and stabilisation of the physiological state. Bacterial small RNAs generally act via antisense pairing with mRNA to down-regulate its translation, either by affecting stability or affecting cis-binding ability. Riboswitches have also been discovered. They are cis-acting regulatory RNA sequences acting allosterically. They change shape when they bind metabolites so that they gain or lose the ability to bind chromatin to regulate expression of genes.

==== CRISPR RNA ====
Archaea also have systems of regulatory RNA. The CRISPR system, recently being used to edit DNA in situ, acts via regulatory RNAs in archaea and bacteria to provide protection against virus invaders.

== RNA synthesis and processing ==
=== Synthesis ===
Synthesis of RNA typically occurs in the cell nucleus and is usually catalyzed by an enzyme—RNA polymerase—using DNA as a template, a process known as transcription. Initiation of transcription begins with the binding of the enzyme to a promoter sequence in the DNA (usually found "upstream" of a gene). The DNA double helix is unwound by the helicase activity of the enzyme. The enzyme then progresses along the template strand in the 3' to 5' direction, synthesizing a complementary RNA molecule with elongation occurring in the 5' to 3' direction. The DNA sequence also dictates where termination of RNA synthesis will occur.

Primary transcript RNAs are often modified by enzymes after transcription. For example, a poly(A) tail and a 5' cap are added to eukaryotic pre-mRNA and introns are removed by the spliceosome.

There are also a number of RNA-dependent RNA polymerases that use RNA as their template for synthesis of a new strand of RNA. For instance, a number of RNA viruses (such as poliovirus) use this type of enzyme to replicate their genetic material. Also, RNA-dependent RNA polymerase is part of the RNA interference pathway in many organisms.

=== RNA processing ===
Uridine to pseudouridine is a common RNA modification.

Many RNAs are involved in modifying other RNAs. Introns are spliced out of pre-mRNA by spliceosomes, which contain several small nuclear RNAs (snRNA), or the introns can be ribozymes that are spliced by themselves. RNA can also be altered by having its nucleotides modified to nucleotides other than A, C, G and U. In eukaryotes, modifications of RNA nucleotides are in general directed by small nucleolar RNAs (snoRNA; 60–300 nt), found in the nucleolus and cajal bodies. snoRNAs associate with enzymes and guide them to a spot on an RNA by basepairing to that RNA. These enzymes then perform the nucleotide modification. rRNAs and tRNAs are extensively modified, but snRNAs and mRNAs can also be the target of base modification. RNA can also be methylated.

== RNA in genetics ==
=== RNA genomes ===
Like DNA, RNA can carry genetic information. RNA viruses have genomes composed of RNA that encodes a number of proteins. The viral genome is replicated by some of those proteins, while other proteins protect the genome as the virus particle moves to a new host cell. Viroids are another group of pathogens, but they consist only of RNA, do not encode any protein and are replicated by a host plant cell's polymerase.

=== Reverse transcription ===
Reverse transcribing viruses replicate their genomes by reverse transcribing DNA copies from their RNA; these DNA copies are then transcribed to new RNA. Retrotransposons also spread by copying DNA and RNA from one another, and telomerase contains an RNA that is used as template for building the ends of eukaryotic chromosomes.

=== Double-stranded RNA ===
Double-stranded RNA

Double-stranded RNA (dsRNA) is RNA with two complementary strands, similar to the DNA found in all cells, but with the replacement of thymine by uracil and the adding of one oxygen atom. dsRNA forms the genetic material of some viruses (double-stranded RNA viruses). Double-stranded RNA, such as viral RNA or siRNA, can trigger RNA interference in eukaryotes, as well as interferon response in vertebrates. In eukaryotes, double-stranded RNA (dsRNA) plays a role in the activation of the innate immune system against viral infections.

=== Circular RNA ===
In the late 1970s, it was shown that there is a single stranded covalently closed, i.e. circular form of RNA expressed throughout the animal and plant kingdom (see circRNA). circRNAs are thought to arise via a "back-splice" reaction where the spliceosome joins a upstream 3' acceptor to a downstream 5' donor splice site. So far the function of circRNAs is largely unknown, although for few examples a microRNA sponging activity has been demonstrated.

== Key discoveries in RNA biology ==
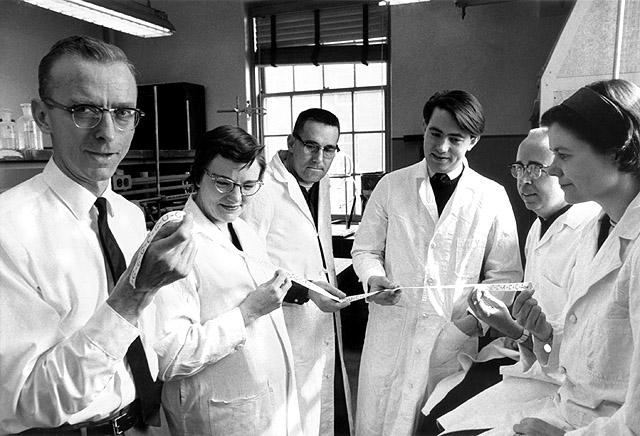
Robert W. Holley, left, poses with his research team.

Research on RNA has led to many important biological discoveries and numerous Nobel Prizes. Nucleic acids were discovered in 1868 by Friedrich Miescher, who called the material 'nuclein' since it was found in the nucleus. It was later discovered that prokaryotic cells, which do not have a nucleus, also contain nucleic acids. The role of RNA in protein synthesis was suspected already in 1939. Severo Ochoa won the 1959 Nobel Prize in Medicine (shared with Arthur Kornberg) after he discovered an enzyme that can synthesize RNA in the laboratory. However, the enzyme discovered by Ochoa (polynucleotide phosphorylase) was later shown to be responsible for RNA degradation, not RNA synthesis. In 1956 Alex Rich and David Davies hybridized two separate strands of RNA to form the first crystal of RNA whose structure could be determined by X-ray crystallography.

The sequence of the 77 nucleotides of a yeast tRNA was found by Robert W. Holley in 1965, winning Holley the 1968 Nobel Prize in Medicine (shared with Har Gobind Khorana and Marshall Nirenberg).

In the early 1970s, retroviruses and reverse transcriptase were discovered, showing for the first time that enzymes could copy RNA into DNA (the opposite of the usual route for transmission of genetic information). For this work, David Baltimore, Renato Dulbecco and Howard Temin were awarded a Nobel Prize in 1975. In 1976, Walter Fiers and his team determined the first complete nucleotide sequence of an RNA virus genome, that of bacteriophage MS2.

In 1977, introns and RNA splicing were discovered in both mammalian viruses and in cellular genes, resulting in a 1993 Nobel to Philip Sharp and Richard Roberts. Catalytic RNA molecules (ribozymes) were discovered in the early 1980s, leading to a 1989 Nobel award to Thomas Cech and Sidney Altman. In 1990, it was found in Petunia that introduced genes can silence similar genes of the plant's own, now known to be a result of RNA interference.

At about the same time, 22 nt long RNAs, now called microRNAs, were found to have a role in the development of C. elegans. Studies on RNA interference earned a Nobel Prize for Andrew Fire and Craig Mello in 2006, and another Nobel for studies on the transcription of RNA to Roger Kornberg in the same year. The discovery of gene regulatory RNAs has led to attempts to develop drugs made of RNA, such as siRNA, to silence genes. Adding to the Nobel prizes for research on RNA, in 2009 it was awarded for the elucidation of the atomic structure of the ribosome to Venki Ramakrishnan, Thomas A. Steitz, and Ada Yonath. In 2023 the Nobel Prize in Physiology or Medicine was awarded to Katalin Karikó and Drew Weissman for their discoveries concerning modified nucleosides that enabled the development of effective mRNA vaccines against COVID-19.

=== Relevance for prebiotic chemistry and abiogenesis ===
In 1968, Carl Woese hypothesized that RNA might be catalytic and suggested that the earliest forms of life (self-replicating molecules) could have relied on RNA both to carry genetic information and to catalyze biochemical reactions—an RNA world. In May 2022, scientists discovered that RNA can form spontaneously on prebiotic basalt lava glass, presumed to have been abundant on the early Earth.

In March 2015, DNA and RNA nucleobases, including uracil, cytosine and thymine, were reportedly formed in the laboratory under outer space conditions, using starter chemicals such as pyrimidine, an organic compound commonly found in meteorites. Pyrimidine, like polycyclic aromatic hydrocarbons (PAHs), is one of the most carbon-rich compounds found in the universe and may have been formed in red giants or in interstellar dust and gas clouds. In July 2022, astronomers reported massive amounts of prebiotic molecules, including possible RNA precursors, in the galactic center of the Milky Way Galaxy.

== Medical applications ==
RNA, initially deemed unsuitable for therapeutics due to its short half-life, has been made useful through advances in stabilization. Therapeutic applications arise as RNA folds into complex conformations and binds proteins, nucleic acids, and small molecules to form catalytic centers. RNA-based vaccines are thought to be easier to produce than traditional vaccines derived from killed or altered pathogens, because it can take months or years to grow and study a pathogen and determine which molecular parts to extract, inactivate, and use in a vaccine. Small molecules with conventional therapeutic properties can target RNA and DNA structures, thereby treating novel diseases. However, research is scarce on small molecules targeting RNA and approved drugs for human illness. Ribavirin, branaplam, and ataluren are currently available medications that stabilize double-stranded RNA structures and control splicing in a variety of disorders.

Protein-coding mRNAs have emerged as new therapeutic candidates, with RNA replacement being particularly beneficial for brief but torrential protein expression. In vitro transcribed mRNAs (IVT-mRNA) have been used to deliver proteins for bone regeneration, pluripotency, and heart function in animal models. SiRNAs, short RNA molecules, play a crucial role in innate defense against viruses and chromatin structure. They can be artificially introduced to silence specific genes, making them valuable for gene function studies, therapeutic target validation, and drug development.

mRNA vaccines have emerged as an important new class of vaccines, using mRNA to manufacture proteins which provoke an immune response. Their first successful large-scale application came in the form of COVID-19 vaccines during the COVID-19 pandemic.

== See also ==
- Biomolecular structure
- RNA virus
- DNA
- History of RNA biology
- List of RNA biologists
- RNA Society
- Macromolecule
- RNA-based evolution
- Aptamer
- RNA origami
- Transcriptome
- RNA world hypothesis
