= List of RNA biologists =

For related information, see the articles on History of RNA Biology, History of Molecular Biology, and History of Genetics.

Name	Dates	Institution	Awards
Abelson, John	born 1938	University of California, San Francisco	1985 National Academy of Sciences (US)
Altman, Sidney	1939–2022	Yale University	1989 Nobel Prize in Chemistry, 1990 National Academy of Sciences (US)
Ambros, Victor	born 1953	University of Massachusetts Chan Medical School	2007 National Academy of Sciences (US), 2008 Lasker Award, 2009 Horwitz Prize, 2015 Breakthrough Prize, 2024 Nobel Prize in Physiology or Medicine
Atkins, John		University College Cork	2007 Royal Irish Academy Gold Medal Award
Baltimore, David	1938–2025	California Institute of Technology	1974 National Academy of Science (US), 1975 Nobel Prize in Physiology or Medicine
Barré-Sinoussi, Françoise	born 1947	Pasteur Institute	2008 Nobel Prize in Physiology or Medicine
Bartel, David		Massachusetts Institute of Technology	2005 National Academy of Science Award in Molecular Biology
Baulcombe, David	born 1952	Cambridge University	2008 Lasker Award
Belfort, Marlene	born 1945	Wadsworth Center	1999 National Academy of Sciences (US)
Benzer, Seymour	1921–2007	California Institute of Technology	1961 National Academy of Science (US), 1971 Lasker Award, 1976 Horwitz Prize
Birnstiel, Max	1933–2014	University of Zurich	1983 National Academy of Science (US)
Blackburn, Elizabeth	born 1948	University of California, San Francisco	1993 National Academy of Sciences (US), 2006 Lasker Award, 2007 Horwitz Prize, 2009 Nobel Prize in Physiology or Medicine
Breaker, Ronald R.	born 1964	Yale University	2006 National Academy of Science Award in Molecular Biology
Brenner, Sydney	1927–2019	Salk Institute	1971 & 2000 Lasker Award, 1977 National Academy of Science (US), 2002 Nobel Prize in Physiology or Medicine
Brown, Donald D.	1931–2023	Carnegie Institution for Science	1973 National Academy of Science (US), 1985 Horwitz Prize
Bruening, George		University of California, Davis	1992 National Academy of Science (US)
Burge, Christopher	born 1968	Massachusetts Institute of Technology	2001 Overton Prize, 2003 Searle Scholar Award
Carthew, Richard	born 1956	Northwestern University	1995 Pew Biomedical Scholar
Caruthers, Marvin	born 1940	University of Colorado, Boulder	1994 National Academy of Science (US)
Cech, Thomas	born 1947	University of Colorado, Boulder	1987 National Academy of Sciences (US), 1988 Lasker Award, 1988 Horwitz Prize, 1989 Nobel Prize in Chemistry
Chambon, Pierre	born 1931	Institute for Genetics and Cell and Molecular Biology, Strasbourg	1985 National Academy of Science (US), 1999 Horwitz Prize
Crick, Francis	1916–2004	Salk Institute	1960 Lasker Award, 1962 Nobel Prize in Physiology or Medicine
Dahlberg, James E.		University of Wisconsin, Madison	1996 National Academy of Sciences (US)
Darnell, James	born 1930	Rockefeller University	1973 National Academy of Science (US), 2002 Lasker Award
Darnell, Robert	born 1957	Rockefeller University	2010 National Academy of Medicine (US), 2014 National Academy of Science (US)
Doolittle, W. Ford	born 1941	Dalhousie University	2002 National Academy of Science (US)
Doudna, Jennifer	born 1964	University of California, Berkeley	2002 National Academy of Sciences (US), 2020 Nobel Prize in Chemistry (US)
Dulbecco, Renato	1914–2012	CNR Institute of Biomedical Technologies (Italy)	1961 National Academy of Science (US), 1964 Lasker Award, 1975 Nobel Prize in Physiology or Medicine
Feigon, Juli		University of California, Los Angeles	2009 National Academy of Science (US)
Fire, Andrew	born 1959	Stanford University	2004 National Academy of Science (US), 2006 Nobel Prize in Physiology or Medicine
Gall, Joseph G.	1928–2024	Carnegie Institution	1972 National Academy of Science (US), 2006 Lasker Award, 2007 Horwitz Prize
Gallo, Robert	born 1937	National Institutes of Health (US)	1982 & 1986 Lasker Award
Gilbert, Walter	born 1932	Harvard University	1976 National Academy of Sciences (US), 1979 Lasker Award, 1979 Horwitz Prize, 1980 Nobel Prize in Chemistry
Greider, Carol	born 1961	Johns Hopkins University	2003 National Academy of Sciences (US), 2006 Lasker Award, 2007 Horwitz Prize, 2009 Nobel Prize in Physiology or Medicine
Guthrie, Christine		University of California, San Francisco	1993 National Academy of Science (US)
Hannon, Greg	born 1964	Cold Spring Harbor Laboratory	2007 National Academy of Science Award in Molecular Biology
Henkin, Tina M.		Ohio State University	2006 National Academy of Science Award in Molecular Biology
Hoagland, Mahlon	1921–2009	Worcester Foundation for Biomedical Research	1984 National Academy of Sciences (US)
Holley, Robert	1922–1993	Cornell University	1965 Lasker Award, 1968 Nobel Prize in Physiology or Medicine
Hurwitz, Jerard		Sloan-Kettering Institute	1974 National Academy of Sciences (US)
Jacob, François	1920–2013	Pasteur Institute	1965 Nobel Prize in Physiology or Medicine, 1969 National Academy of Science (US)
Joyce, Gerald	born 1956	Scripps Research Institute	2001 National Academy of Sciences (US)
Kaesberg, Paul		University of Wisconsin, Madison	1991 National Academy of Sciences (US)
Khorana, H. Gobind	1922–2011	Massachusetts Institute of Technology	1966 National Academy of Sciences (US), 1968 Nobel Prize in Physiology or Medicine, 1968 Horwitz Prize, 1968 Lasker Award
Klug, Aaron	1926–2018	Medical Research Council (UK)	1981 Horwitz Prize, 1982 Nobel Prize in Chemistry, 1984 National Academy of Science (US)
Kornberg, Roger	born 1947	Stanford University	1993 National Academy of Sciences (US), 2006 Nobel Prize in Chemistry, 2006 Horwitz Prize
Lambowitz, Alan		University of Texas, Austin	2004 National Academy of Sciences (US)
Maquat, Lynne	born 1952	University of Rochester	2011 National Academy of Sciences (US), 2015 Canada Gairdner International Award, 2017 National Academy of Medicine (US), 2018 Wiley Prize in Biomedical Sciences
Mello, Craig	born 1960	University of Massachusetts Chan Medical School	2006 Nobel Prize in Physiology or Medicine
Montagnier, Luc	1932–2022	Pasteur Institute	1986 Lasker Award, 2008 Nobel Prize in Physiology or Medicine
Moore, Peter	born 1939	Yale University	National Academy of Sciences (US)
Nirenberg, Marshall	1927–2010	National Institutes of Health (USA)	1967 National Academy of Sciences (US), 1968 Nobel Prize in Physiology or Medicine, 1968 Lasker Award, 1968 Horwitz Prize
Noller, Harry	born 1939	University of California, Santa Cruz	1992 National Academy of Sciences (US)
Nomura, Masayasu	1927–2011	University of California, Irvine	1978 National Academy of Sciences (US)
Ochoa, Severo	1905–1993	New York University	1959 Nobel Prize in Physiology or Medicine
Orgel, Leslie	1927–2007	Salk Institute	1990 National Academy of Sciences (US)
Pace, Norman R.	born 1942	University of Colorado, Boulder	1991 National Academy of Science (US)
Ptashne, Mark	born 1940	Sloan-Kettering Institute	1985 Horwitz Prize, 1997 Lasker Award
Ramakrishnan, Venkatraman	born 1952	Medical Research Council (UK)	2004 National Academy of Sciences (US), 2009 Nobel Prize in Chemistry
Roberts, Richard	born 1943	New England Biolabs	1993 Nobel Prize in Physiology or Medicine
Rich, Alexander	1924–2015	Massachusetts Institute of Technology	1970 National Academy of Sciences (US)
Roeder, Robert	born 1942	Rockefeller University	1988 National Academy of Science (US), 1999 Horwitz Prize, 2003 Lasker Prize
Rosbash, Michael		Brandeis University	2003 National Academy of Science (US), 2017 Nobel Prize in Physiology or Medicine (US)
Ruvkun, Gary	born 1952	Harvard University	2008 Lasker Award, 2008 National Academy of Sciences, 2009 Horwitz Prize, 2015 Breakthrough Prize, 2024 Nobel Prize in Physiology or Medicine
Schimmel, Paul		Scripps Research Institute	1990 National Academy of Sciences (US)
Sharp, Philip	born 1944	Massachusetts Institute of Technology	1983 National Academy of Science (US), 1988 Lasker Award, 1988 Horwitz Prize, 1993 Nobel Prize in Physiology or Medicine
Shatkin, Aaron		Rutgers University	1981 National Academy of Science (US)
Singer, Maxine	1931–2024	Carnegie Institution of Washington	1979 National Academy of Sciences (US), 1992 National Medal of Science (US)
Söll, Dieter	born 1935	Yale University	1997 National Academy of Sciences (US)
Spiegelman, Sol	1914–1983	Columbia University	1974 Lasker Award
Steitz, Joan	born 1941	Yale University	1983 National Academy of Sciences (US)
Steitz, Thomas	1940–2018	Yale University	1990 National Academy of Sciences (US), 2009 Nobel Prize in Chemistry
Stevens, Audrey	1932–2010	Oak Ridge National Laboratory	1998 National Academy of Science (US)
Szostak, Jack	born 1952	Harvard University	1998 National Academy of Sciences (US), 2006 Lasker Award, 2009 Nobel Prize in Physiology or Medicine
Temin, Howard	1934–1994	University of Wisconsin, Madison	1975 Nobel Prize in Physiology or Medicine
Tinoco, Ignacio	1930–2016	University of California, Berkeley	1985 National Academy of Sciences (US)
Tjian, Robert	born 1949	University of California, Berkeley	1991 National Academy of Sciences (US), 1999 Horwitz Prize
Todd, Alexander	1907–1997	University of Cambridge	1957 Nobel Prize in Chemistry
Turner, Douglas		University of Rochester	2011 Gordon Hammes Lectureship
Uhlenbeck, Olke		Northwestern University	1993 National Academy of Sciences (US)
Watson, James	1928–2025	Cold Spring Harbor Laboratory	1960 Lasker Award, 1962 Nobel Prize in Physiology or Medicine, 1962 National Academy of Science (US)
Yanofsky, Charles	1925–2018	Stanford University	1966 National Academy of Science (US), 1971 Lasker Award, 1976 Horwitz Prize
Yonath, Ada	1939–2026	Weizmann Institute of Science	2003 National Academy of Sciences (US), 2005 Horwitz Prize, 2009 Nobel Prize in Chemistry
Zamecnik, Paul	1912–2009	Worcester Foundation for Biomedical Research	1968 National Academy of Sciences (US), 1996 Lasker Award
Zamore, Phillip	born 1963	University of Massachusetts Chan Medical School	2014 National Academy of Inventors, 2023 National Academy of Sciences (US), 2023 National Academy of Medicine, 2023 American Academy of Arts and Sciences
Zinder, Norton	1928–2012	Rockefeller University	1969 National Academy of Science (US)
