= Thomas A. Steitz =

American biochemist (1940–2018)

Thomas Steitz ForMemRS
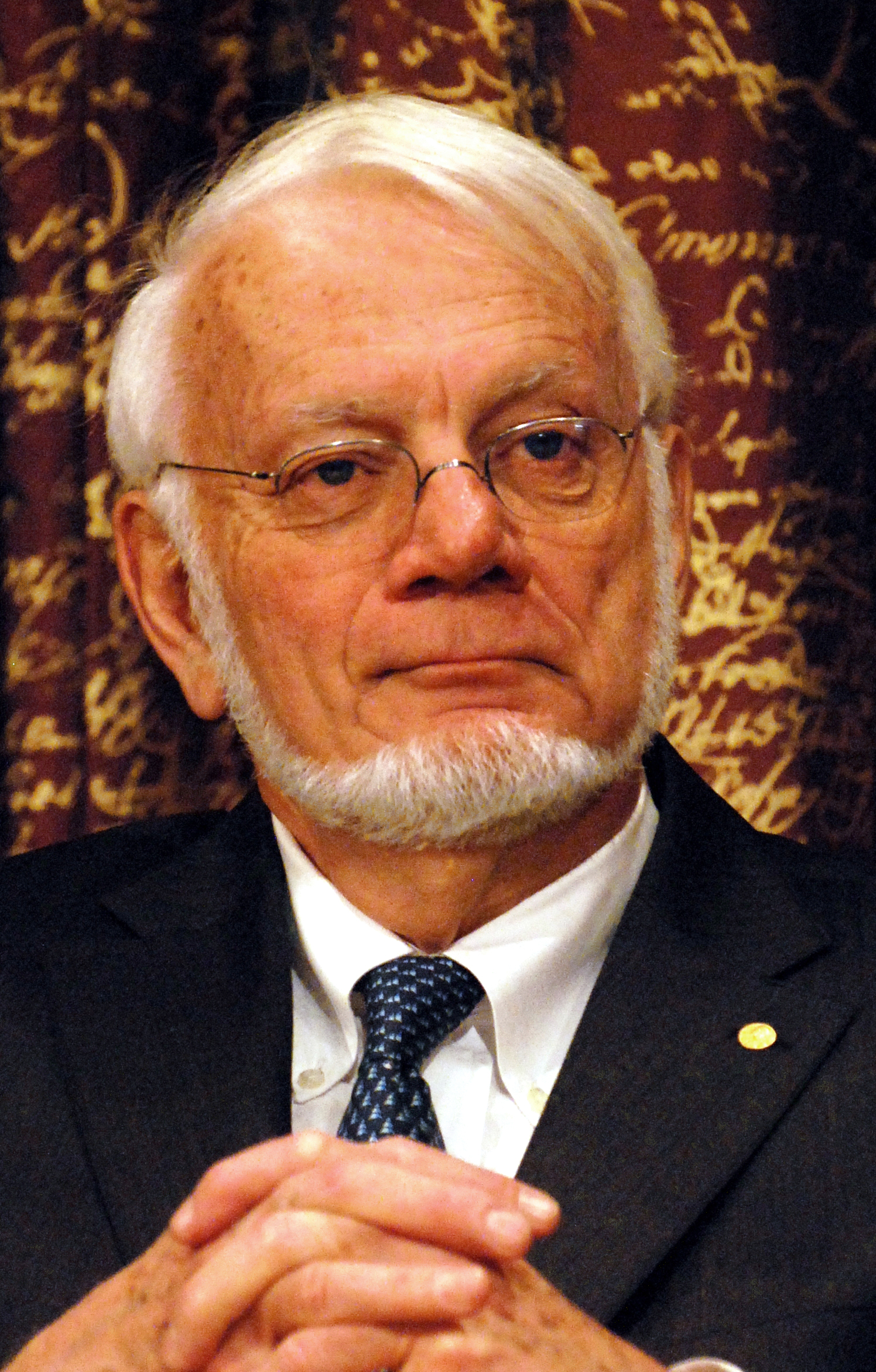
- Steitz in 2009
- Born: Thomas Arthur Steitz; August 23, 1940; Milwaukee, Wisconsin, U.S.
- Died: October 9, 2018 (aged 78); Branford, Connecticut, U.S.
- Education: Wauwatosa High School, Lawrence University, Harvard University
- Known for: Bio-crystallography
- Spouse: Joan A. Steitz
- Children: 1
- Awards: Sir Hans Krebs Medal (2000); Keio Medical Science Prize (2006); Gairdner Foundation International Award (2007); Nobel Prize in Chemistry (2009)
- Scientific career
- Fields: Crystallography; Structural biology
- Workplaces: Howard Hughes Medical Institute, Yale University, University of California, Berkeley
- Thesis: The 6⁰A crystal structure of carboxypeptidase A (1967)
- Doctoral advisor: William N. Lipscomb, Jr.
- Other academic advisors: David M. Blow
- Notable students: Nenad Ban
- Website: steitzlab.yale.edu

Thomas Arthur Steitz (August 23, 1940 – October 9, 2018) was an American biochemist, a Sterling Professor of Molecular Biophysics and Biochemistry at Yale University, and investigator at the Howard Hughes Medical Institute, best known for his pioneering work on the ribosome.

Steitz was awarded the 2009 Nobel Prize in Chemistry along with Venkatraman Ramakrishnan and Ada Yonath "for studies of the structure and function of the ribosome". Steitz also won the Gairdner International Award in 2007 "for his studies on the structure and function of the ribosome which showed that the peptidyl transferase (EC 2.3.2.12) was an RNA catalyzed reaction, and for revealing the mechanism of inhibition of this function by antibiotics".

== Education and career ==
Born in Milwaukee, Wisconsin, Steitz studied chemistry as an undergraduate at Lawrence University in Appleton, Wisconsin, graduating in 1962. In June 2010, the University renamed its chemistry building Thomas A. Steitz Hall of Science.

He received a Ph.D. in biochemistry and molecular biology from Harvard University in 1966 where he worked under the direction of subsequent 1976 chemistry Nobel Prize winner William N. Lipscomb, Jr. While at Harvard, after the training task of determining the structure of the small molecule methyl ethylene phosphate, Steitz made contributions to determining the atomic structures of carboxypeptidase A (EC 3.4.17.1) and aspartate carbamoyltransferase (EC 2.1.3.2), each the largest atomic structure determined in its time.

Steitz did postdoctoral research as a Jane Coffin Childs Postdoctoral Fellow at the MRC Laboratory of Molecular Biology during 1967–1970.

Steitz briefly held an assistant professorship at the University of California, Berkeley, but he resigned on the grounds that the institution would not accept his wife Joan into a faculty position because she was a woman.

Both Tom and Joan Steitz instead joined the Yale faculty in 1970, where he continued to work on cellular and structural biology. Steitz and Peter Moore determined the atomic structure of the large 50S ribosomal subunit using X-ray crystallography, and published their findings in Science in 2000. In 2009, Steitz was awarded the Nobel Prize in Chemistry for his ribosome research.

He was also a Macy Fellow at the University of Göttingen during 1976–1977 and a Fairchild Scholar at the California Institute of Technology during 1984–1985.

Steitz was also one of the founders of a company, Rib-X Pharmaceuticals, now Melinta Therapeutics for the development of new antibiotics based on the ribosome.

== Honors ==
- Nobel Prize in Chemistry (2009)
- Elected a Foreign Member of the Royal Society (ForMemRS) in 2011

== Private life ==
He enjoyed skiing, hiking, and gardening.

It should also be noted that Tom valued a good time. He always looked forward to department happy hours, wine tastings and any other excuse for a party. He hosted many wonderful Halloween parties at his home, always appropriately attire in costume.

Steitz was married to Joan A. Steitz, a distinguished molecular biologist who is also a Sterling Professor of Molecular Biophysics and Biochemistry at Yale. He lived with her in Branford, Connecticut and had one son, Jon, and two grandchildren, Adam and Maddy. He died on October 9, 2018, of complications during treatment of pancreatic cancer.

== Publications ==
- Steitz, T. A., et al. "Determination of the Atomic-Resolution Crystal Structure of the Large Subunit from the Ribosome of Haloarcula marismortui;", nsls newsletter, (November 2000).
- Steitz, T. A., et al. "The Atomic Resolution Crystal Structure of the Large Ribosomal Subunit from Haloarcula marismortui", NSLS Activity Report (2000).

== See also ==
- History of RNA biology
- List of RNA biologists
