= Robert W. Holley =

American biochemist (1922–1993)

- Born: Robert William Holley; January 28, 1922; Urbana, Illinois
- Died: February 11, 1993 (aged 71); Los Gatos, California
- Education: University of Illinois at Urbana–Champaign; Cornell University
- Known for: Transfer RNA
- Awards: Albert Lasker Award for Basic Medical Research (1965); NAS Award in Molecular Biology (1967); Nobel Prize in Physiology or Medicine (1968)
- Scientific career
- Fields: Biochemistry
- Workplaces: Salk Institute for Biological Studies

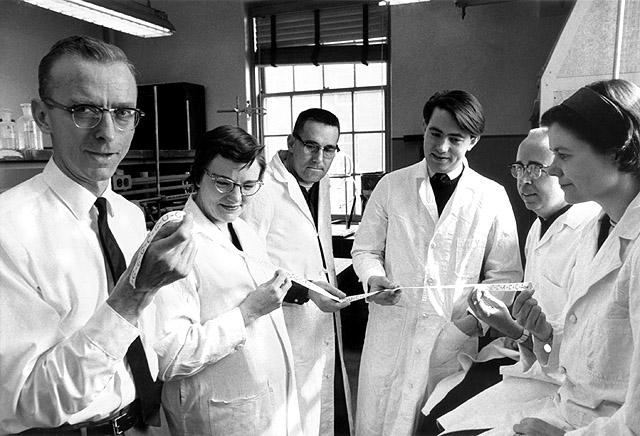
Robert W. Holley, on the far left

Robert William Holley (January 28, 1922 – February 11, 1993) was an American biochemist. He shared the Nobel Prize in Physiology or Medicine in 1968 (with Har Gobind Khorana and Marshall Warren Nirenberg) for describing the structure of alanine transfer RNA, linking DNA and protein synthesis.

Holley was born in Urbana, Illinois, and graduated from Urbana High School in 1938. He went on to study chemistry at the University of Illinois at Urbana-Champaign, graduating in 1942 and commencing his PhD studies in organic chemistry at Cornell University. During World War II Holley spent two years working under Professor Vincent du Vigneaud at Cornell University Medical College, where he was involved in the first chemical synthesis of penicillin. Holley completed his PhD studies in 1947.

Following his graduate studies Holley remained associated with Cornell. He became an assistant professor of organic chemistry in 1948, and was appointed as professor of biochemistry in 1962. He began his research on RNA after spending a year's sabbatical (1955–1956) studying with James F. Bonner at the California Institute of Technology.

Holley's research on RNA focused first on isolating transfer RNA (tRNA), and later on determining the sequence and structure of alanine tRNA, the molecule that incorporates the amino acid alanine into proteins. Holley's team of researchers determined the tRNA's structure by using two ribonucleases to split the tRNA molecule into pieces. Each enzyme split the molecule at location points for specific nucleotides. By a process of "puzzling out" the structure of the pieces split by the two different enzymes, then comparing the pieces from both enzyme splits, the team eventually determined the entire structure of the molecule. The group of researchers include Elizabeth Beach Keller, who developed the cloverleaf model that describes transfer RNA, during the course of the research.

The structure was completed in 1964, and was a key discovery in explaining the synthesis of proteins from messenger RNA. It was also the first nucleotide sequence of a ribonucleic acid ever determined. Holley was awarded the Nobel Prize in Physiology or Medicine in 1968 for this discovery, and Har Gobind Khorana and Marshall W. Nirenberg were also awarded the prize that year for contributions to the understanding of protein synthesis.

Using the Holley team's method, other scientists determined the structures of the remaining tRNA's. A few years later the method was modified to help track the sequence of nucleotides in various bacterial, plant, and human viruses. He died in 1993

In 1968 Holley became a resident fellow at the Salk Institute for Biological Studies in La Jolla, California.

According to the New York Times obituary, "He was an avid outdoorsman and an amateur sculptor of bronze." His widow Ann died in 1996.

== See also ==
- History of RNA biology
- List of RNA biologists
