= Françoise Barré-Sinoussi =

French virologist and Nobel laureate (born 1947)

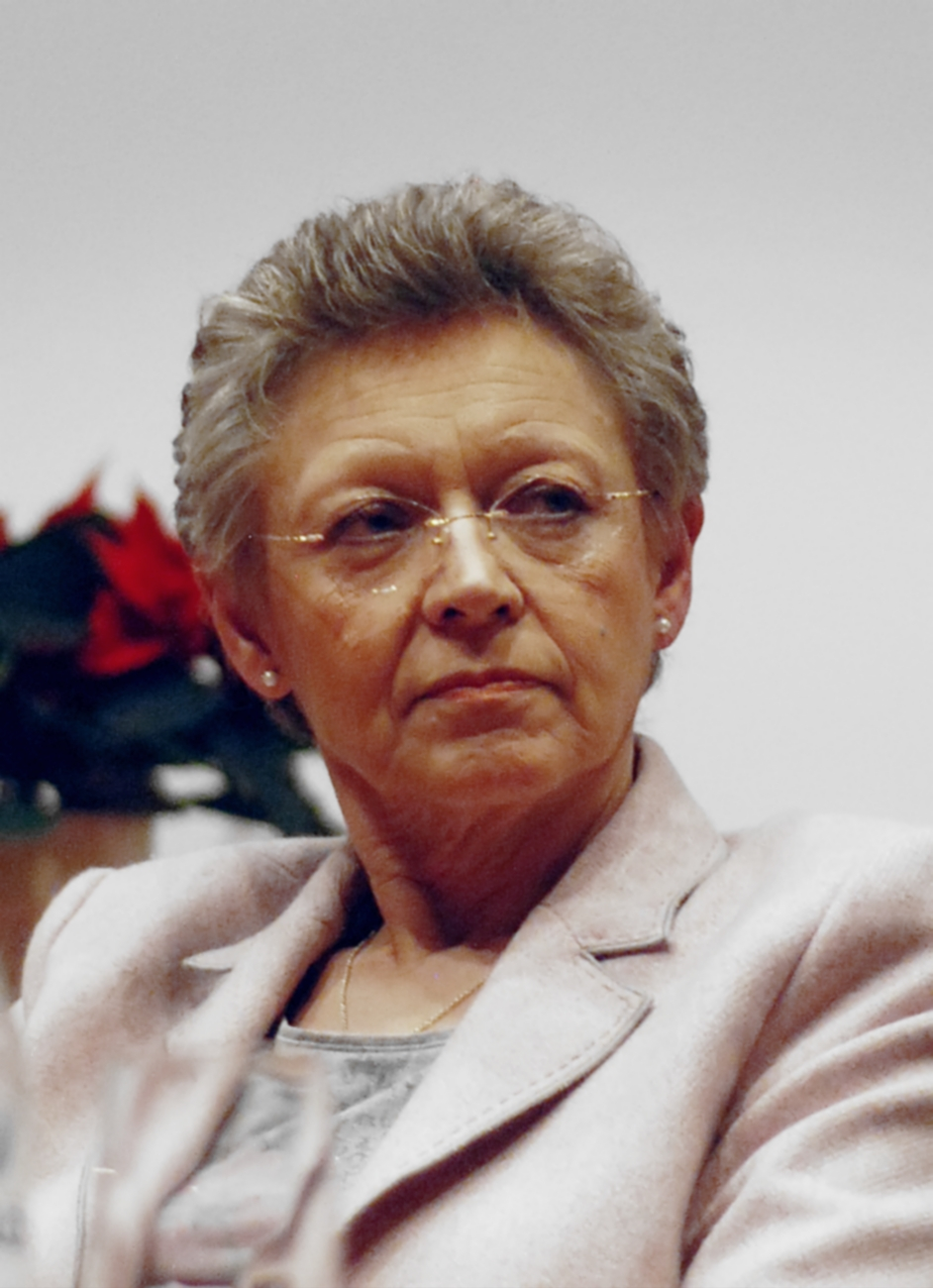
- Barré-Sinoussi in 2008
- Born: 30 July 1947 (age 79); Paris, France
- Education: University of Paris
- Known for: Co-discoverer of HIV
- Awards: 2008 Nobel Prize in Physiology or Medicine
- Scientific career
- Fields: Virology
- Workplaces: Pasteur Institute

Françoise Barré-Sinoussi (French: [fʁɑ̃swaz baʁesinusi]; born 30 July 1947) is a French virologist and Director of the Regulation of Retroviral Infections Division (French: Unité de Régulation des Infections Rétrovirales) and Professor at the Institut Pasteur in Paris. Born in Paris, Barré-Sinoussi performed some of the fundamental work in the identification of the human immunodeficiency virus (HIV) as the cause of AIDS. In 2008, Barré-Sinoussi was awarded the Nobel Prize in Physiology or Medicine, together with her former mentor, Luc Montagnier, for their discovery of HIV. She mandatorily retired from active research on 31 August 2015, and fully retired by some time in 2017.

== Early life ==
Barré-Sinoussi was interested in science from a very young age. During her vacations as a child, she would spend hours analyzing insects and animals, comparing their behaviors and trying to understand why some run faster than others for example. Soon after, Barré-Sinoussi realized she was very talented in the sciences compared to her humanity courses. She expressed interest to her parents that she would like to attend university to study science or become a researcher. Barré-Sinoussi admitted that she was more interested in becoming a doctor but at the time she was under the false impression that studying medicine was both more expensive and lengthier than a career in science. After two years studying at the university, Barré-Sinoussi attempted to find part-time work in a laboratory to ensure that she had made the right career choice. After nearly a year of searching for laboratory work, she was finally accepted by the Pasteur Institute. Her part-time work at the Pasteur Institute quickly became full-time. She began to only attend university to take the exams and had to rely on her friends' class notes because she was not regularly attending class. However, Barré-Sinoussi was actually scoring higher on her exams than before because she finally had the motivation because she had realized a career in science was what she wanted to do.

== Academic career ==
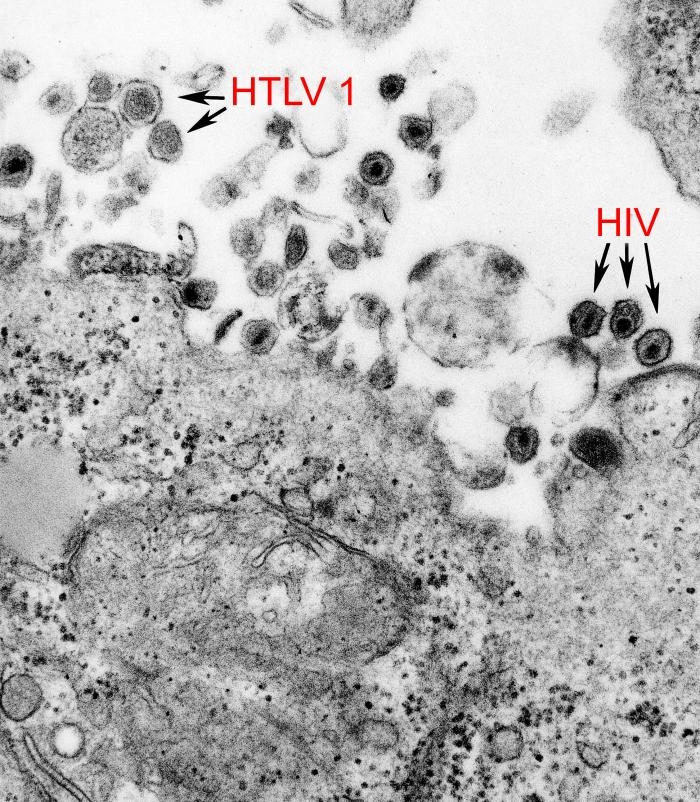
The human T-lymphotropic virus type 1 (HTLV-1), and the human immunodeficiency virus (HIV)

Barré-Sinoussi joined the Pasteur Institute in Paris in the early 1970s. She received her PhD in 1974 and interned at the U.S. National Institutes of Health before returning to the Pasteur Institute in Montagnier's unit.

During the early AIDS epidemic in 1981–1984, the viral cause of the outbreak had not yet been identified. Working with Luc Montagnier, Jean-Claude Chermann and others at the institute, Barré-Sinoussi isolated and grew a retrovirus from a biopsied swollen lymph node of a patient at risk for AIDS. This virus would later be known as HIV-1, the causative agent behind the outbreak. This discovery allowed for the development of diagnostic tests to aid in controlling the spread of the virus, for informing policy on the treatment of people living with AIDS, and for many important advancements in the science of HIV/AIDS that ultimately saved countless lives.

Barré-Sinoussi started her own laboratory at the Pasteur Institute in 1988. Among Barré-Sinoussi's many recent research contributions are studies of various aspects of the adaptive immune response to viral infection, the role of innate immune defenses of the host in controlling HIV/AIDS, factors involved in mother-to-child transmission of HIV, and characteristics that allow a small percentage of HIV-positive individuals, known as elite suppressors or controllers, to limit HIV replication without antiretroviral drugs. She has co-authored over 240 scientific publications, has participated in over 250 international conferences, and has trained many young researchers.

Barré-Sinoussi has actively contributed to several scientific societies and committees at the Institut Pasteur as well as to other AIDS organizations, such as the National Agency for AIDS Research in France. She has also been implicated at an international level, notably as a consultant to the WHO and the UNAIDS-HIV.

Since the 1980s, Barré-Sinoussi has initiated collaborations with developing countries and has managed multidisciplinary networks with dedication. In 2016, she was interviewed by the Sunday Observer and reflected on how Jamaica is dealing with HIV. She constantly works on establishing permanent links between basic research and clinical research with the aim of achieving concrete improvements in the areas of prevention, clinical care, and treatment.

Professor Barré-Sinoussi believes that scientists have made steady progress given the development of antiretroviral treatment which UNAIDS states is being accessed by 17 million of the people globally who are living with AIDS, but finding a cure, or cures, will take time, and a continued investment in research. As the co-chair of the 21st International AIDS Society (IAS), she said the search for curative strategy of HIV is a goal of paramount importance and a priority for the future of HIV research. Moreover, even though research to achieve such cures is in a formative stage, significant advances are being made towards a HIV cure.

In 2009, she wrote an open letter to Pope Benedict XVI in protest over his statements that condoms are at best ineffective in the AIDS crisis.

In July 2012 Barré-Sinoussi became President of the International AIDS Society.

=== Path to HIV discovery ===
When Francoise Barré-Sinoussi began working on retroviruses at the Pasteur Institute there were large programs in the United States working on the association between cancer and retroviruses, so she decided to study the link between retroviruses and leukemia in mice. After the new disease emerged (not yet named AIDS), a group of French physicians came to the Pasteur Institute to ask the rather simple question: is this new disease caused by a retrovirus? After much discussion with other colleagues, including Luc Montagnier, they concluded the agent causing this new disease may be a retrovirus but it was not HTLV, the only known retrovirus at the time, because of differing defining characteristics. In the early 1980s, Barré-Sinoussi was already familiar with the technique of detecting reverse transcriptase activity. If reverse transcriptase activity is present, it confirms that the virus is a retrovirus. In December 1982, heavy research began and clinical observations suggested that the disease attacked immune cells because of the significant CD4 cell depletion. However, the depletion of the CD4 lymphocytes made it very difficult to isolate the virus in patients with the disease later known as AIDS. Because of the difficulty isolating an infected cell from a patient with late disease progression, Barré-Sinoussi and her colleagues decided to use a lymph node biopsy from a patient with generalized lymphadenopathy. Generalized lymphadenopathy was a common symptom of patients in the early stages of disease progression. In the second week of checking the biopsied cell cultures for reverse transcriptase activity, enzymatic activity was detected and increased for a short time until the reverse transcriptase activity decreased dramatically after the T-lymphocytes in the culture began to die. Barré-Sinoussi and her colleagues decided to add lymphocytes from a blood donor in order to save the culture and it proved successful after the virus transmitted to the newly added lymphocytes from the blood donor and significant reverse transcriptase activity was again detected. At this point, the virus was named LAV for Lymphadenopathy Associated Virus, which would later be renamed to HIV, the human immunodeficiency virus. 1983 marked the beginning of Barré-Sinoussi's career researching HIV that continued until her retirement. 1983 was also the year it became clear that HIV was not only a target for what was known as the 4Hs, homosexuals, hemophiliacs, Haitians and heroin addicts, but that HIV was also targeting heterosexuals – making the likelihood that the HIV related disease, AIDS, was an epidemic very high.

== Leadership ==
Francoise Barré-Sinoussi remained at the Pasteur Institute and was appointed head of the Biology of Retroviruses Unit in 1992. The Biology of Retroviruses Unit was reconfirmed in 2005 and renamed the Regulation of Retrovirial Infections Unit. Currently, the unit is working on vaccine research against HIV and the correlates of protection against AIDS for immunotherapy. Barré-Sinoussi's career has also included integration with resource-limited countries, such as Vietnam and Central African Republic. Her experiences working in developing nations with the World Health Organization were truly eye-opening experiences for her and motivated her to continue to collaborate scientifically with various countries through Africa and Asia. This collaboration has promoted many exchanges and workshops between young scientists from resource-limited countries and researches in Paris.

Francoise Barré-Sinoussi was elected to the International AIDS Society (IAS) Governing Council in 2006 and served as the president of the IAS from 2012 to 2016. Barré-Sinoussi worked on the Conference Advisory Committee for the 9th IAS Conference on HIV Science, which took place in July 2017 and is currently serving as co-chair of the IAS, working toward an HIV cure initiative.

== Awards and Honors ==
Barré-Sinoussi shared the 2008 Nobel Prize in Physiology or Medicine with Luc Montagnier for their co-discovery of HIV, and with Harald zur Hausen, who discovered the viral cause of cervical cancer that led to the development.

In addition to the Nobel Prize, Barré-Sinoussi has received awards and honors including:

- The Sovac Prize
- The Körber European Science Prize (aka Körber Foundation Prize for the Promotion of European Science)
- The Prize of the French Academy of Sciences (Académie des sciences)
- The King Faisal International Prize
- The International AIDS Society Prize
- Barré-Sinoussi was named an Officer of the National Order of the Legion of Honour (Ordre national de la Légion d'honneur) in 2006 and was raised to Commander in 2009. She was promoted to the dignity of Grand Officer in 2013.
- She received an honorary Doctor of Science degree from Tulane University in May 2009, and an honorary Doctor of Medicine from the University of New South Wales in July 2014.
- Françoise Barré-Sinoussi was awarded a doctoral honoris causa on 4 October 2014 by the École polytechnique fédérale de Lausanne.
- In 2019, Time created 89 new covers to celebrate women of the year starting from 1920; it chose Barré-Sinoussi for 1983.

== See also ==
- History of RNA biology
- List of female Nobel laureates
- List of RNA biologists
- Timeline of women in science
