= Mahlon Hoagland =

American biochemist (1921–2009)

Mahlon Bush Hoagland
- Born: October 5, 1921; Boston, Massachusetts, USA
- Died: September 18, 2009 (aged 87); Thetford, Vermont
- Education: Harvard Medical School
- Known for: Discovery of amino-acid activating enzymes and tRNA
- Spouse: Elizabeth Stratton Hoagland
- Parent: Hudson Hoagland
- Awards: Franklin Medal
- Scientific career
- Fields: Biochemist
- Workplaces: Harvard Medical School, Dartmouth Medical School, Worcester Foundation for Experimental Biology

Mahlon Bush Hoagland (October 5, 1921 – September 18, 2009) was an American biochemist who discovered transfer RNA (tRNA), the translator of the genetic code.

== Biography ==
=== Early life ===
Mahlon Bush Hoagland was born in Boston, Massachusetts, in 1921 to Hudson Hoagland and Anna Hoagland. Hudson was an American physiologist who was known for co-founding the Worcester Foundation for Experimental Biology with Gregory Pincus. Mahlon Hoagland graduated from The Hill School in 1940 and attended Williams College, and in 1948 received his M.D. from Harvard Medical School with intentions of becoming a pediatric surgeon. After a bout with tuberculosis, Hoagland was forced to change career directions and became involved with research.

After graduating from Harvard Medical School he, his daughter Judith and his wife Elizabeth Stratton Hoagland lived in the home of designer Louise Kenyon and her family. Kenyon was part of the Folly Cove Designers and Hoagland worked with them in Annisquam for several years while he commuted to Boston for work.

Hoagland took a research position at Massachusetts General Hospital in the lab of Paul Zamecnik, where he researched and detailed the role of transfer RNA in forming proteins. He was working with Zamecnick and Elizabeth Keller when he discovered the initial steps of protein synthesis.

From 1953 to 1967, Hoagland served as an associate professor of microbiology at Harvard Medical School. In 1967, upon leaving Harvard he was appointed professor in the biochemistry department at the Dartmouth Medical School. In 1970, Hoagland became scientific director of the Worcester Foundation for Experimental Biology, retiring in 1985 after 15 years in the directorship.

=== Work ===
By the time Hoagland had joined Huntington Laboratories, his colleagues there were well known for their work in protein synthesis. In the early 1950s, Hoagland and his associates were able to show that polypeptide synthesis occurs on ribosomes. They did this by giving a rat injections of radioactive amino acids, waiting for a defined period of time, extracting the liver, and examining sub-cellular fractions for radioactivity. He found that after longer periods of times (hours, days) radioactively labeled proteins were present in all subcellular fractions. However, if they allowed less time to pass, radioactivity was found in only certain particles, which they deemed the sites of proteins synthesis. These particles were named ribosomes.

During their experiments with rat liver cells, Hoagland and Zamecnik noticed that in the presence of ATP, amino acids associate with heat soluble RNA, which was later named transfer RNA (tRNA). This amino acid and tRNA complex was later called aminoacyl-tRNA. Hoagland's major contribution to the laboratory was in his work with amino acid activating enzymes. He discovered that certain enzymes were required to activate amino acids so they could associate with tRNA molecules and eventually be incorporated into new protein molecules. These enzymes were named aminoacyl tRNA synthetases. Incidentally, this lab's discovery of tRNA supported the theory of complementarity (molecular biology) proposed by Watson and Crick.

He was awarded the Franklin Medal in 1976.

Mahlon Hoagland's other work involved the carcinogenic effects of beryllium, biosynthesis of coenzyme A, as well as liver regeneration and control.

== Works ==
- Hoagland, MB et al. "A soluble ribonucleic acid intermediate in protein synthesis.”Journal of Biological Chemistry. 1958 Mar; 231(1):241-57.
- Hoagland, M.B. Toward the Habit of Truth: A life in Science. New York: Norton, 1990.
- Dodson, Bert, and Mahlon Hoagland. The Way Life Works: The Science Lover's Illustrated Guide to How Life Grows, Develops, Reproduces, and Gets Along. New York: Times Books, 1995.
