= Bobbi Campbell =

American nurse and early AIDS activist (1952–1984)

- Bobbi Campbell (left), with his lover Bobby Hilliard, on the cover of Newsweek, August 8, 1983
- Born: Robert Boyle Campbell, Jr. January 28, 1952; Columbus, Georgia, U.S.
- Died: August 15, 1984 (aged 32); San Francisco, California, U.S.
- Cause of death: Cryptosporidiosis, resulting from AIDS
- Resting place: New Tacoma Cemetery, Tacoma, Washington, U.S.
- Other names: "KS poster boy"; "AIDS poster boy"
- Occupation: Public health nurse
- Known for: AIDS activism, co-writing the Denver Principles

Robert Boyle "Bobbi" Campbell Jr. (January 28, 1952 – August 15, 1984) was a public health nurse and an early United States AIDS activist. In September 1981, at the age of 29, Campbell became the 16th person in San Francisco to be diagnosed with Kaposi's sarcoma, when that was a proxy for an AIDS diagnosis. He was the first to come out publicly as a person with what came to be known as AIDS, writing a regular column in the San Francisco Sentinel, syndicated nationwide, describing his experiences and posting photos of his KS lesions to help other San Franciscans know what to look for, as well as helping write the first San Francisco safer sex manual, Play Fair!.

He rapidly became one of the leading activists co-founding People With AIDS San Francisco in 1982 and then, the following year, with HIV+ men from across the U.S., he co-wrote the Denver Principles, the defining manifesto of the People With AIDS Self-Empowerment Movement. Appearing on the cover of Newsweek and being interviewed on national news reports, Campbell raised the national profile of the AIDS crisis among heterosexuals and provided a recognizable face of the epidemic for affected communities. He also lobbied Margaret Heckler, Secretary of Health and Human Services in the Reagan administration over both practical issues and stigmatising medical practices affecting people with AIDS. He also continued to campaign for LGBT+ rights, speaking outside the 1984 Democratic National Convention a month before his death from cryptosporidiosis.

== Before the AIDS crisis ==
Born in Georgia in 1952 and raised in Tacoma, Washington, Bobbi Campbell earned a degree in nursing from the University of Washington and volunteered at The Seattle Counseling Services for Sexual Minorities, the first gay-run counseling service for gay people in the country, while being politically active in Seattle during the city's initial wave of gay liberation in the 1970s. He lived communally in Capitol Hill with other gay male activists at what was known informally as the "East John Street Gay Men's Collective", described by his former lover Tom Richards as "a notorious and famous house with colorful and smart people."

Campbell moved from Seattle to San Francisco in 1975, getting a job in a hospital near The Castro and immersing himself in the political and social life of the community, which had become a center for the LGBT community over the previous few years. By 1981, he had enrolled in a training program at University of California, San Francisco, to become an adult health nurse practitioner, with a view to focusing on healthcare in the gay and lesbian community.

== Diagnosis and local activism ==
Starting with a case of shingles in February 1981, Bobbi Campbell suffered a succession of unusual illnesses, including leukopenia later that summer. After hiking the Pinnacles National Monument with his boyfriend in September that year, he noticed on his feet lesions of Kaposi's sarcoma (KS), then thought of as a rare cancer of elderly Jewish men but with alarming numbers of cases appearing in California and New York City and now known to be closely associated with AIDS. He was formally diagnosed as having KS by dermatologist Marcus Conant on October 8, 1981. This would become Conant's first diagnosis of a patient with what would become known as AIDS; Campbell brought Conant a rose every year to commemorate the anniversary of his diagnosis.

While the New York Native was printing several stories about the "gay cancer" beginning to make its way round the city, with detailed medical writing by Lawrence D. Mass, a gay physician and psychiatrist, the San Francisco gay press largely ignored the nascent epidemic. Campbell's interest in educational outreach and professional interest in gay sexual health combined to inspire him to raise awareness himself. As a result, in October 1981, the same month he was diagnosed, Campbell put pictures of his KS lesions in the window of the Star Pharmacy at 498 Castro Street, urging men with similar lesions to seek medical attention. In doing so, he created and displayed San Francisco's first AIDS poster.

After speaking with Randy Alfred, a friend and editor of the San Francisco Sentinel, Campbell agreed to write a column "to demystify the AIDS story". In his first article, on December 10, 1981, he proclaimed himself to be the "KS Poster Boy" (later "AIDS Poster Boy"), becoming the first person in the US to publicly disclose that he was suffering from "gay cancer", writing:

The purpose of the poster boy is to raise interest and money in a particular cause, and I do have aspirations of doing that regarding gay cancer. I'm writing because I have a determination to live. You do, too—Don't you?

This article turned into a regular column in the Sentinel—and syndicated in newspapers serving the LGBT community nationwide—describing his experiences. On January 10, 1982, Campbell was interviewed by Alfred for The Gay Life program on KSAN-FM, with doctors Marcus Conant and Paul Volberding; the interview has been archived by the GLBT Historical Society.

Campbell joined the Sisters of Perpetual Indulgence at the time of the health crisis in early 1982; in his "sister" persona as Sister Florence Nightmare RN, he co-authored the first San Francisco safer sex manual, Play Fair!, written in plain sex-positive language, using humor to leaven practical advice. The Sisters were early awareness and fundraisers for the oncoming AIDS pandemic and continue to raise awareness of sexual health; many Orders regularly pass out condoms and participate in events to educate people on sexual health issues.

In February 1982, on the invitation of Conant and Volberding, Campbell and Dan Turner, who had just himself been diagnosed with KS, attended what turned out to be the founding meeting of the KS/AIDS Foundation, which later became the San Francisco AIDS Foundation, of which Campbell then served on the board. Campbell also became involved with the Shanti Project (which moved from its original focus, supporting people with terminal cancer, to help provide emotional support to people diagnosed with AIDS coming to terms with death) and persuaded reluctant physicians to allow him to meet and counsel AIDS patients at Conant's KS clinic.

== The People With AIDS Movement ==
In 1982, Campbell and Turner convened a meeting that spawned People With AIDS San Francisco, founding the "People With AIDS Self-Empowerment Movement" or PWA Movement, rapidly followed by Michael Callen and Richard Berkowitz, authors of How to Have Sex in an Epidemic, in New York City. As well as arguing that people with AIDS should expect to participate actively in the response to the AIDS crisis, the PWA Movement rejected the terms "AIDS victim" and "AIDS patient," as Campbell explained in interviews, for example:

The BAR ran a story on a friend of mine ... the headline read "Coalition treasurer KS victim" and my friend, who is the subject of this interview, was very unhappy because the implication of "KS victim" means the bus has run over you and you're laying there in the street, flattened. And he's very much alive; so am I. I do not feel like a "victim."

With other members of People With AIDS San Francisco, Campbell organized the first candlelight march to bring attention to the plight of people with AIDS and to remember those who had died of AIDS. On May 2, 1983, they marched behind a banner of "Fighting for our lives" for the first time, drawing around 10,000 people. On May 23, 1983, People With AIDS San Francisco voted to send Campbell and Turner to the Fifth National Lesbian and Gay Health Conference, at which the Second National AIDS Forum would be held.

Campbell and his colleagues' push to persuade service organizations to sponsor gay men with AIDS to attend the Conference was a key moment in the People With AIDS Self-Empowerment Movement. Michael Callen subsequently wrote that, despite a growing sense of being patronised, it had not occurred to the AIDS-diagnosed New Yorkers to "be anything more than the passive recipients of the genuine care and concern"; once people with AIDS realised they could advocate for themselves, lessons learned from the feminist and the civil rights movement helped with a more-widespread acceptance of the notion of self-empowerment.

The national PWA movement came fully together when Campbell took charge of a discussion where, with Callen, Turner and others, he drafted the Denver Principles, the defining manifesto of the PWA Movement, which, again, start with the rejection of the terms "victim" and "patient." Campbell and the San Franciscans had different thoughts on the origin (etiology) of AIDS from Callen and the New Yorkers—Campbell described as "crazy" the idea that AIDS was caused by promiscuity, a perspective espoused by Callen and Berkowitz (and their physician Joseph Sonnabend) at the time—and the Denver Principles represent a "careful synthesis" of these two positions:

The activists—in an echo of the Lavender Menace radical feminists storming the NOW convention stage in 1970—decided to storm the stage of the closing session of the Second National AIDS Forum in order to present the Denver Principles. As each of the 11 men read out one of the 11 statements, they did so with the "Fighting for our lives" banner behind them, from the San Francisco march earlier that month; these words became the slogan of the PWA Movement.

After the conference, Campbell flew to New York with Callen, Berkowitz and Artie Felson, organizing and planning for local and national PWA organizations on the plane. On arrival, they organized a PWA organization in the city despite initial opposition from the Gay Men's Health Crisis. They also planned a national PWA organization which opened in New York City in June 1984. PWA-New York went on to create the first safer sex poster to appear in a gay bathhouse in the city.

In June 1984, the annual San Francisco's Gay Freedom Day Parade was dedicated for the first time to people with AIDS. Dykes on Bikes have led the parade since the mid-1970s and People With AIDS followed immediately behind.

== Wider activism ==
Initially, there was very little coverage of the AIDS crisis outside the gay community—while 1982 saw 800 reported cases and 350 AIDS-related deaths in the US, there were only 6 stories about AIDS on major network news and print media up to May 1983 included little coverage beyond the gay press and the San Francisco Chronicle—Lawrence Altman, medical writer at The New York Times had a piece refused in 1981, and Jerry Bishop, a science writer at The Wall Street Journal, had a piece on AIDS refused by his editor in early 1982, whereas the Chronicle hired Randy Shilts to report on AIDS full-time in 1982. Campbell and Conant featured in the earliest nationally broadcast news reports on the "gay cancer" on June 12, 1982, where Barry Petersen interviewed Campbell, Larry Kramer and James Curran, who led the CDC taskforce, for CBS News.

After being criticized for omitting any coverage of a Madison Square Garden benefit in April 1983, The New York Times increased its coverage of AIDS, setting the tone for an increase across print media. One of the most high-profile early pieces introducing AIDS to the heterosexual community was the cover article of the August 8, 1983, edition of Newsweek, showing Campbell and his lover Bobby Hilliard and headlined "EPIDEMIC: The Mysterious and Deadly Disease Called AIDS May Be the Public Health Threat of the Century. How Did it Start? Can it Be Stopped?"—only the second time an openly gay man had appeared on the cover of a mass-market news magazine, albeit with Hilliard identified as Campbell's "friend." The following week, with Callen, Berkowitz, Felson and Turner, he met with Margaret Heckler, Secretary of Health and Human Services in the Reagan administration. They found Heckler to be receptive to suggestions and, when Campbell pushed the issue of delays in people with AIDS's claims for Social Security, she promised to raise it with her counterpart at the Social Security Administration.

At the first Clinical Nursing Conference on AIDS, in Washington, D.C., on October 7, 1983, Campbell presented a poster session, "dressed for the part" in white pants and a lab coat. The poster session was designed to help clinicians and nurses understand the message of the Denver Principles, about respect for people with AIDS, rather than considering them as "victims." While at the conference, he attended a talk by an infection control nurse at the National Institutes of Health where he discovered the agency's "maximum awareness" policy recommended the use of electric green "AIDS Precaution" tags on AIDS patients' rooms, blood tubes and laundry. With Artie Felson, he shouted his disgust at the "creepy" policy from the back of the room and arranged an impromptu meeting of the National Association of People With AIDS, where they decided to pay visit to Heckler at her office in Bethesda, Maryland. They spoke with Shelley Lengel, a spokesperson for the new National AIDS Helpline, however Lengel did not call them back with further information about the policy.

In January 1984, when Dan White, the assassin of gay San Francisco Supervisor Harvey Milk and Mayor George Moscone, was due to be paroled, Campbell and Hilliard stood outside Soledad State Prison. As White had been transported to Los Angeles for fear of retributive attacks, attendant media had little to cover beyond Campbell with a sign reading "Dan White's homophobia is more deadly than AIDS," bringing further national attention to the health crisis.

Later that year, Campbell traveled with Angie Lewis to New Orleans for the annual convention of the American Nursing Association in June, where they gave a 45-minute or hour-long presentation—possibly a plenary session—about AIDS and HIV, having been invited at the last minute; Lewis suggested this may have been because the ANA were unsure about hosting the session.

Campbell gave one of his last speeches at the National March for Lesbian and Gay Rights when the 1984 Democratic National Convention was held in San Francisco in July. He was introduced as a feminist, a registered Democrat and a Person With AIDS; he had served as a board director of the National AIDS Foundation and on the steering committee of the Federation of AIDS-related Organizations, founded the National Association of People With AIDS and testified in front of Congressional subcommittees. Campbell told the crowd that he had hugged his boyfriend on the cover of Newsweek, and then kissed Hilliard on stage "to show Middle America that gay love is beautiful," criticizing the Christian right for using scripture to justify their homophobia. After criticising the lack of progress being made by the Reagan administration, he held 15 seconds of silence for the 2,000 who had died of AIDS at that point "and [for] those who will die before this is over," before laying out a series of concerns for politicians to address—including increased funding for both research and support services and a warning of the potential for discrimination with the advent of a test for HTLV-3 (now known as HIV)—and appealing to all candidates in the upcoming elections to meet with people with AIDS.

Two weeks later, Campbell appeared on CBS Evening News in a live satellite interview with Dan Rather. While the rumors and fear of AIDS had reached a mainstream audience, the facts had not yet, so Campbell was placed in a glass booth, with technicians refusing to come near him to wire up microphones for the interview.

== Death and legacy ==
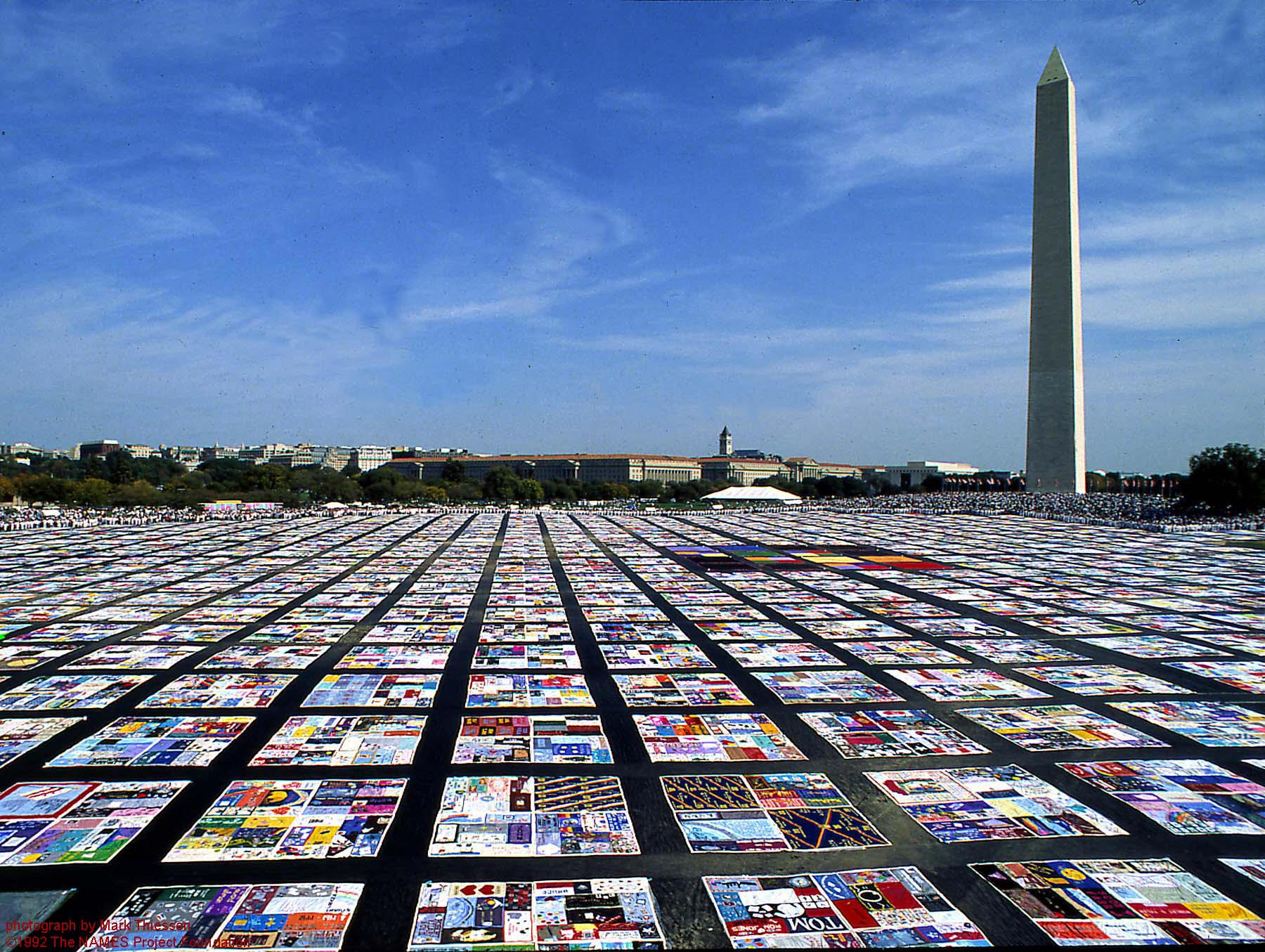
NAMES Project AIDS Memorial Quilt in front of the Washington Monument

A few days after the DNC speech, another case of shingles left scars across his head; within weeks he was hospitalized with cryptosporidiosis and subsequently cryptococcal meningitis. At noon on August 15, 1984, exactly a month after his DNC speech and after two days on life support in intensive care, Campbell died at San Francisco General Hospital when his blood pressure dropped rapidly. His parents and his partner Bobby Hilliard were by his side. Campbell was 32 years old and had lived for over 3½ years with AIDS.

Two days later, the city closed Castro Street for Campbell's funeral cortège, where 1,000 people gathered to remember Campbell. A "reverential chant" by the Sisters of Perpetual Indulgence was followed by several speeches, including Conant and Hilliard as well as Campbell's parents and local performers (including Lea DeLaria and Holly Near) and an audio recording of Paul Boneberg introducing Campbell at the National March for Lesbian and Gay Rights a month earlier. In his August 23 obituary in the Bay Area Reporter, Allen White described the event as "exactly what should be expected to remember a hero in a crisis." The Gay Life radio show on KSAN-FM, presented by Randy Alfred, Campbell's editor at the Sentinel, covered his memorial across two weeks, on September 16 and 23, 1984. His body was taken back to Washington state and interred at New Tacoma Cemetery in Tacoma, Washington. Campbell had kept a journal throughout his life; Angie Lewis arranged for the journal to be donated to the UCSF Archives and Special Collections.

The 1985 Lesbian/Gay Freedom Day Parade was dedicated to Campbell, "for the work he did as a Person With AIDS, and as a symbol for all of us who continue to fight against the threat that AIDS poses to our survival." In 2015, the group "Let's Kick ASS—AIDS Survivor Syndrome" were looking to have a commemorative plaque erected at the site of the Star Pharmacy (now a Walgreens), where Campbell first put up images of his KS lesions. As of 2016, Bobbi Campbell is memorialized on 4 separate panels of the NAMES Project AIDS Memorial Quilt.

In the 1993 docudrama TV movie And the Band Played On, adapted from Randy Shilts's book of the same name about the early days of the AIDS crisis, Campbell was played by Donal Logue. Campbell was portrayed by Kevin McHale in the 2017 docudrama miniseries When We Rise written by Dustin Lance Black to chronicle the gay rights movement. The name "Bobbi Campbell" and the names of several other key figures of the time were featured in the American Mock Trial Association's 2007–08 National Case Problem, albeit in a fictional case, unrelated to Campbell's life.
