= How to Have Sex in an Epidemic =

1983 book by Richard Berkowitz and Michael Callen

- Authors: Richard Berkowitz; Michael Callen
- Language: English
- Subject: Safe sex
- Publication date: 1983
- Publication place: United States
- Media type: Print

How to Have Sex in an Epidemic: One Approach is a 1983 manual by Richard Berkowitz and Michael Callen, under the direction of Joseph Sonnabend, to advise men who have sex with men (MSM) about how to avoid contracting the infecting agent which causes AIDS. It was among the first publications to recommend the use of condoms to prevent the transmission of STDs in men having sex with men, and has even been named, along with Play Fair!, as one of the foundational publications in the advent of modern safe sex.

== Background ==
=== Authors ===
The booklet was co-written by Michael Callen and Richard Berkowitz, with scientific advisement from Dr. Sonnabend. Callen's partner Richard Dworkin was the editor. Both Callen and Berkowitz had been diagnosed with AIDS when they wrote the booklet and had a thorough knowledge of the sexual culture of gay and bisexual men in New York City. Sonnabend describes the symbiotic relationship between the three as one in which he contributed medical and scientific information while Callen added the more political points and Berkowitz, who had educated himself with Sonnabend's scientific archives for the sake of his own treatment, synthesized the two.

=== HIV/AIDS epidemic ===
In May 1983, when How to Have Sex in an Epidemic was published, the AIDS epidemic in New York City has only recently begun and panic about the unknown causes, means of transmission and potential for treatment for AIDS was spreading rapidly. The misconception that there was something inherent in the lifestyle of all gay men that put them at risk for infection was common at the time and led to the development of a stigma surrounding both the disease and gay sex. Doctor Sonnabend wrote that "it may be impossible for those who did not directly experience the uncertainty and terror of the early years of AIDS to appreciate the circumstances under which these guidelines [for safe sex] were constructed."

At the time when How to Have Sex in an Epidemic was written, there was no consensus on the cause of AIDS, but two main theories existed: the "new agent theory," which was increasingly the scientific consensus, and the "multifactorial theory," which Callen, Berkowitz and Sonnabend adopted as their basis for sexual education around AIDS transmission prevention. The new agent theory proposed that AIDS was caused by a single, previously unknown pathogen, likely a retrovirus similar to the Human T-lymphotropic virus (HTLV). According to the multifactorial theory, however, continual overexposure to semen, specifically cytomegalovirus (CMV) in semen, lead to an eventual state of immunosuppression that characterized AIDS. This was based on prior scientific studies that revealed the role that CMV can play in causing cellular immune-related abnormalities. The multifactorial theory espoused in the manual has since been disproven; the majority of scientists are now in agreement that AIDS is caused by the transmission of the retrovirus HIV.

As a result of the lack of agreement on AIDS cause and transmission, it was difficult to determine the risk of various forms of sexual contact. Berkowitz, in the introduction to his autobiography, describes how, in the early years of the epidemic, risk categorizations were rewritten every few months: "anal sex with a condom became an endless back and forth dance, from high risk to medium risk to low risk to possibly safe." It was this confusion that prompted the authors to create a safe sex manual that clearly outlined for men having sex with men the dangers of each type of contact and various methods to protect oneself from exposure.

=== LGBT culture and politics ===
After the Sexual Revolution and the Gay Liberation in the 1960s and '70s, sex in urban gay epicenters was not only newly acceptable, but also often seen as key to gay identity and resistance to heteronormativity. AIDS brought up a renewed fear about negative media coverage and the civil rights violations that LGBT people might face from targeted quarantines and a denial of basic healthcare services. As such, the issue of safe sex was a contentious one, and any arguments criticizing frequent sex were poorly received by the majority of the community. A large sector of LGBT community leadership worried that raising awareness about AIDS and gay sex would be off-putting to the straight majority and damage the image of the subculture as a whole. Activists still deeply entrenched in the battle to protect the political gains of the past decade tended to overlook the AIDS crisis as a political attack, a topic too controversial to address, or an overreaction by self-hating gay men.

The authors of How to Have Sex in an Epidemic were aware of the political risks they took in creating the booklet: Berkowitz noted in his autobiography the possibility that their writing could be used as ammunition by homophobic institutions and leaders. However, their advocacy was motivated by the increasingly critical state of the health crisis and their shared belief in what Callen described as the danger of "put[ting] political considerations over the tragedy of even a single gay man's death."

Before the AIDS epidemic, condoms were mostly advertised and used for preventing pregnancies and therefore were not considered a viable safe sex or STD prevention tool among the LGBT community: David France estimates that less than 1% of men who have sex with men in New York City used them regularly in the 1970s, despite the fact that many other sexually transmitted diseases, including cytomegalovirus and hepatitis B, were already at "endemic" levels. Sonnabend writes about condoms at the time: "I think most gay men said, 'Oh thank god, that's one thing we don't have to worry about,'" and many didn't know how to use one. However, as Callen, Berkowitz and Sonnabend would show them, condoms really were something to worry about and could be an easy way to prevent disease and death while continuing to have a normal and fulfilling sex life.

Along with Play Fair!, its San Francisco counterpart written by a drag group called the Sisters of Perpetual Indulgence, How to Have Sex in an Epidemic was the first sex-positive manual for safe sex—in other words, it did not present sex in a negative, shameful or moralistic light. Sonnabend writes in the introduction to the booklet that one of their goals was to "explore the many different forms of sexual expression open to gay men." As David France later recounted, the authors actively tried to avoid condescension or arrogance in their writing (despite the fact that Callen himself had acknowledged that telling people how to have sex is inherently an arrogant thing to do), instead attempting to establish a dialogue, "queen to queen," between themselves and the people for whom they created the manual. Callen even educated himself about different philosophers, including Hannah Arendt, to get an idea of the best way to productively use writing to influence people through rhetoric and written arguments. The independent and community-driven nature of this approach to LGBT-related safe sex, according to Cindy Patton, can be traced back to the "self-help model" promoted in the women's health movement.

== Content ==
The primary message of How to Have Sex in an Epidemic is 1) to use protection (i.e., condoms) during sex and 2) to limit the specific sex acts one performs to those with a lower risk of contagion. It was a model that attempted to challenge traditional anti-promiscuity and anti-gay viewpoints in previous safe sex education and AIDS prevention—as Callen and Berkowitz argued, it's what you do, not how often you do it or who you do it with. In other words, they had searched for, and come up with, what they termed the possibility of "life-affirming sex."

The categories below contain summaries of the chapters of How to Have Sex in an Epidemic and the arguments presented therein:

=== What causes AIDS? ===
The authors introduce the two presiding theories of AIDS transmission and present their arguments for the multifactorial model. They describe the role of CMV in causing abnormalities in immune cells, as well as the potential for gradual immune overload by semen and harmful immune complexes resulting from the binding of antibodies to antigens on other STDs. This section presents evidence against the "new agent theory" but acknowledges that in either case, AIDS is likely sexually transmitted and therefore the best method of prevention will be the use of protection and more critical choice in which sexual acts to perform.

=== CMV in connection with AIDS ===
In this section, Callen and Berkowitz elaborate on the multifactorial model to provide a basis for later applications of safe sex practices. They cite the New England Journal of Medicine study that found that traces of CMV were found in 94% of MSM in a New York City cohort in 1981, but later estimate that CMV was present in ¼ of sexually active gay men in 1982–83, which, when factoring in the average frequency and diversity of partners in the population of sexually active gay men in New York City, would still amount to a high number of exposures per year. The reasoning behind their support of the multifactorial theory was the concurrent epidemics of AIDS and CMV in the same sexual networks and locations; they called it the "one common link found in all gay men with AIDS." They summarize the characteristics of CMV and its links to AIDS as the following:

- Cytomegalovirus itself is a type of herpesvirus that is present in bodily fluids.
- It remains in the body for more than a year after the immune system has fought off its initial effects.
- It often manifests again in people with severely compromised immune systems (i.e., those with AIDS).
- It was also found in some KS tumors of people with AIDS, and can activate the Epstein Barr virus, causing lymphoma and lymphadenopathy (both common symptoms of AIDS).
- Like HIV, CMV has a latency period that makes it easily transmittable and impossible to discern when picking sexual partners.

This part of the manual stresses the fact that it's not a single infection putting people at risk, but instead repeated exposure to the virus in semen, particularly through anal-receptive intercourse. In addition to the specific cytomegalovirus in sperm, the authors argue that simply exposing the body to such high intake levels of sperm itself can present a health risk. Although the multifactorial model had been criticized for failing to account for the sudden appearance of AIDS, the authors use the fact that the rate of CMV infections in urban sexually active gay men rose significantly in last decade as evidence of the "new" component that accounts for the rapid increase in AIDS cases. They advise readers to get tested for CMV and describe which tests to get (e.g. antibody tests or viral isolation of CMV from urine and semen), but also acknowledge that the price of such tests ($200) and the fact that it was not routinely offered at traditional clinics and labs might make it inaccessible to most patients.

=== Ethics and responsibility ===
In this section, the authors stress the need for the gay male community to come together to protect itself. A central component of this was that one's own sexual health and the health of others should "never became separated." They wrote that it was important to think about not only what sexual acts would put oneself in a risky position in terms of disease transmission, but also what would be dangerous for one's partner. They recognize the importance of maintaining mental control during sex, and argue that although it's easy to forget about safety in the heat of the moment, the growing threat of sickness and death should be enough to motivate people to act with foresight. Their primary piece of advice within the "control" subsection is not abstinence; instead, it centers around the importance of staying sober during sexual encounters in order to make informed decisions. This, Callen and Berkowitz write, means not drinking, smoking, or taking poppers before going clubbing. They also emphasize the importance of communication with one's partner in the broader discussion of maintaining control, including the need to talk about health concerns, disease status, and convince him to engage in whatever sexual acts safely.

=== Risk categories ===
Much of the rest of the pamphlet is dedicated to discussing the many possible forms of sexual expression available to gay and bisexual men and providing a thorough analysis of the risk associated with each particular act. This analysis is warranted by the fact that, as the authors recognized, different diseases spread through different types of contact, and specifically AIDS/CMV (as they saw it back then) is much more easily transmitted through certain sex acts.

Note that some of these categorizations are incorrect given current knowledge about HIV transmission, and the descriptions below should not be presumed to be the medical consensus.

- Sucking (i.e. giving oral sex): The authors categorize sucking as having a "moderate" risk: although the exposure to semen is not as direct as when it is taken in anally, they state that oral sex, for the person coming into contact with semen, is not risk free (for CMV infection) except with condom use. The compromise they suggest is to avoid having your partner come in your mouth, and, if they do accidentally, to spit out the ejaculate to reduce the risk of transmission.
- Getting sucked (receiving oral sex): According to How to Have Sex, oral sex probably has no risk for the receiver, but there are still hygiene protocols such as washing, not coming in the person's mouth, etc. that someone in this position should follow to protect the health of his partner. Additionally, it is only risk free from the perspective of CMV/AIDS, as there are plenty of other pathogens that can be transmitted through oral sex.
- Fucking (anal penetrative/insertive): This is another position where the authors identified little to no risk for CMV transmission. Again, their main argument is that it is still necessary to wear a condom to protect one's partner, and, by extension, the sexually active community of men who have sex with men as a whole. Because condoms were not commonly used at the time, the authors conceded that if someone finds it difficult to get used to the sensation to the point where they are dissuaded from using a condom altogether, they should at least pull out before coming to prevent exposing their partner to semen. They also point out the risk of condoms tearing, particularly as most at the time were designed for vaginal, not anal, intercourse. David France recounts that while Callen and Berkowitz were ready to put all of anal sex into the "never again category" (i.e. high risk), Sonnabend, from his experience in clinical practice, was able to see that the people with the majority of the infections were those who were bottoms (i.e. those in the anal-receptive position), which then allowed him to discern a differential in risk depending on one's position in the sexual relationship.
- Getting fucked (i.e. anal-receptive): Being penetrated in unprotected anal sex was identified as the act with the greatest risk for contracting CMV, and, under the multifactorial model, AIDS. This follows naturally from the fact that anal sex results in the ejaculation of semen into the rectum, where it is easily absorbed by the mucosa into the bloodstream. Callen and Berkowitz made sure to acknowledge, however, that this statement about high risk is not a condemnation of bottoms/men who are penetrated in gay sex. The authors incorporate a feminist critique into the pamphlet, arguing that the ingrained concept that manliness is compromised in the act of being penetrated in gay sex can create a certain degree of defensiveness when it comes to accepting that this is inherently a more dangerous position to be in, in terms of contracting AIDS. This is a prime example of how How to Have Sex attempted to address every element of its education in a sex-positive and affirming way. "Remember that the issue is disease—not sex," they tell their readers.
- Rimming (anal-oral): The authors identified this as a high risk activity, stating that there is no way to rim in a risk-free way without being in a monogamous relationship where both people have been tested. Their advice is to avoid it unless the above criteria are met.
- Kissing: How to Have Sex describes kissing as an activity with moderate risk of CMV transmission, although this risk, they say, can be mitigated partially by kissing with closed lips. They discuss the social and emotional importance of kissing and the negative impact that avoiding it could have on the gay community.
- Low risk alternatives: The authors include various pieces of advice about how to change or moderate one's sexual behavior to avoid getting infected. Among these are masturbation and alternative methods of penetration, including the use of fingers, toys, dildos, etc. They describe dildos as a good and relatively safe way to avoid contracting STDs, with the caveat that they be 1) flexible and relatively short to avoid wounds, 2) washed and disinfected regularly, and 3) not shared from person to person. They suggest ways of getting creative with mutual masturbation and jerk-off clubs, as well as "closed circles of fuck buddies," that create the possibility for safer but non-monogamous sex. They describe jerk-off clubs as typically having a friendly and welcoming atmosphere and clearly posted rules, and encourage their readers to ask around for these in their area or develop their own versions. However, Callen, Berkowitz and Sonnabend also acknowledge that the "closed circles," based on the concept that a group of uninfected people can freely have unprotected sex as long as they do so only within that same group, are very much reliant on the trustworthiness of all members and are therefore more risky than monogamy. Furthermore, it was difficult to determine one's HIV status at the time of the book's publishing, given that the virus itself hadn't even been isolated, much less an antibody test designed to diagnose infection.
- Water sports (sexual activity involving urine): Because CMV is found in high quantities in urine, How to Have Sex describes water sports as something to be avoided, particularly anything that resulted in urine inside the rectum.
- Fisting: This activity, although it is described as "extremely dangerous" in other capacities, had no known connection to AIDS.
- Sadism and masochism: The authors take a positive stance on S&M, but emphasize the importance of setting limits and using protection within this environment and limiting the acts one performs to avoid direct bodily fluid contact between people. Most important in this setting, they explain, is prior communication between the people involved about the need to have safe sex, which can naturally be incorporated into the customary setting of boundaries, safe words, etc. that occurs in the context of S&M.
- Washing up: Although this is not a sexual act, per se, Callen and Berkowitz stress the importance of washing with soap and water both before and after sex. They recommend Betadine soap with iodine and an antimicrobial soap scrub called Hibiclens. True to their sex-positive style, they recommend making showering part of the foreplay.
- "Backrooms, Bookstores, Balconies, Meatracks and Tearooms" and "The Baths": These locations, generally sites designed for cruising and casual, public sex, were a highly risky environment for disease spread of all kinds. Backrooms and similar spaces tend to be dark and have limited washing facilities. The authors recognize that it is still possible to have medically safe sex in these situations, only much more difficult. The solutions, then, as presented in How to Have Sex, are "talking, washing, light and rubbers." They recommend talking to one's potential partner, even something as simple as "been here long?" to scope out how potentially infectious the person is, as well as to communicate about one's safe sex preferences (be it using condoms, not performing certain acts, using dildos, etc.). The authors say that, if the person gets defensive (which is understandable, given that the implication is that he will give you a disease), you should politely move on. They strongly recommend going to a place with shower facilities and also suggest some form of examination of one's partner's body before sex as another assessment of their health; they write, "you don't have to be clinical. Make it a part of foreplay." Lastly, in these situations where sex is often anonymous, exchanging numbers is a good way to be able to keep track of one's sexual encounters and communicate should someone become infected—this is part of the more community-driven mindset that the authors wanted to promote around sex. Lastly, Berkowitz and Callen recognize that visiting the baths is habitual for many gay men, and discuss the strategy that some have been using of masturbating before going to give oneself more self control and prevent risky behavior.
- Poppers: A common theory circulating in the early `80s was that the use of poppers (amyl and butyl nitrates), a common party drug in the LGBT nightclub scene, was a cofactor for AIDS transmission. However, the authors of How to Have Sex refute this idea, citing scientific proof vindicating the drug, although they also mention that there is a small transmission risk increase associated with taking poppers because it dilates the blood vessels, thus facilitating the entry of microorganisms. They also draw attention to the dangers of poppers outside the realm of disease transmission, including the drugs' extreme toxicity when swallowed.
- Buying sex: Callen and Berkowitz stress the importance sexual health in sex work, as well. To those in the position of paying for the sex, they say to make sure their partner respects their health concerns, or else look for someone else. They also warn their readers that, while escort services may claim that their employees are healthy, they cannot actually know for sure and cannot be entirely trusted.
- Hustling/selling sex: True to their sex-positive and nonjudgemental tone, the authors first acknowledge hustling as an important source of income for some men who have sex with men. Instead of condemning prostitution, they suggest that sex workers advertise protected sex specifically. They also recognize the unique difficulties posed for hustlers in prioritizing their sexual health because they are "in the business of satisfying others' needs" and emphasize the need to establish guidelines for safe sex before getting together. According to How to Have Sex, bilateral prevention of disease transfer in sex work is important in a global health context because sex workers were key to the national and international spread of AIDS.

=== Should people with AIDS have sex? ===
Callen, Berkowitz and Sonnabend begin this section by stating that, regardless of how controversial and subjective the question may be, some people with AIDS do continue to have sex after being infected, whether knowingly or unknowingly, although many may be so incapacitated that sex is "the furthest thing from their minds." The solution, they argue, does not involve treating people with AIDS (PWA) like lepers, as they are just as human as the rest of the population, desire the same human contact and will simply end up being unwilling to disclose their HIV status if automatic ostracism is the result. In all likelihood, the authors contend, the risk of unprotected sex to the person with AIDS is higher than to the uninfected person, as any number of STDs can have a dangerous health impact on someone with a compromised immune system. For a person with AIDS to go to the baths or backrooms would therefore be "extremely unwise."

Based on the multifactorial model of AIDS transmission, the uninfected person would simply be at risk for being exposed to high levels of CMV-infected semen. However, the reality is that the risk of having sex with someone with AIDS is higher than they described because it is caused by a single virus (HIV) that PWA (and people with HIV pre-AIDS) have and uninfected people do not. Either way, they conclude in all capital letters that AIDS PATIENTS HAVE AN ETHICAL OBLIGATION TO ADVISE POTENTIAL PARTNERS OF THEIR HEALTH STATUS." It should be up to the uninfected person to make the informed decision to have sex, evaluating all the risk factors. However, sex between a PWA and an uninfected person, according to the pamphlet, would be fine if they are monogamous lovers and use protection. Given scientific evidence against casual transmission of AIDS, the authors saw no reason to discourage other forms of affection and touching.

=== Guilt, morality and sex negativity ===
How to Have Sex in an Epidemic stresses the importance of separating valid medical advice from moral-based arguments disguised as medicine. In this section, the authors discuss the difficulties posed by the obvious connection between gay sex and the disease, especially given that men who have sex with men, as well as transgender women, were, even before the outbreak of AIDS, often accused of having too much sex by the Moral Majority. Advice during the initial stage of the epidemic was to "cut down" on the frequency of sex, without giving any thought to the type of sex. The authors describe their attempt to correct this incomplete advice by educating people on what types of sexual acts are higher risk as a way to present them with an alternative to abstinence/self-denial and encourage a sex-positive mentality.

The example they provide in the pamphlet is a man who decides to limit the number of times he has sex to 12 per year, but does not change what he does with his partners or how he does it (e.g. with protection or not). The authors conclude that this will not prevent him from putting himself at high risk for contracting AIDS at some point during the year. They stress that sex is not a vice, and therefore giving up sex to avoid getting AIDS is not the same as giving up smoking to avoid lung cancer. The advice to cut down on only the frequency of sex and sexual partners was even less productive under the "new virus model" as opposed to the multifactorial model.

Callen and Berkowitz also bring up the fact that anonymous sex was highly criticized by the straight majority, but telling one's partner one's name will not make a difference to the infectivity of the pathogen. However, they recognize anonymity during sex might make the issue of protecting one's partner from disease transmission less pressing and/or personally important.

This section of the manual also highlights the importance of talking to one's physicians and making sure the information one gets about the disease is reliable by looking at multiple sources and doing individual research. They conclude: "If we are to celebrate our gayness and get on with Gay Liberation, we must stay healthy. To stay healthy, we must realize that the issue isn't gayness or sex; the issue is simply disease."

=== Love ===
The penultimate section of How to Have Sex in an Epidemic was added after both Sonnabend and Richard Dworkin read it over and were struck by the complete absence of the word "love" in a manual about safe sex. Afterwards, the authors realized the potential it had as a moral and emotional justification for the use of protection and added this section, starting by admitting, "It came as quite a shock to us to find that we had written almost 40 pages on sex without mentioning the word "love" once." David France explain that Callen and Berkowitz both "cared deeply for their vast sexual communities" and Sonnabend agreed, saying, "you could really love somebody even for just four hours. Genuinely."

In this section, the authors describe the years post-Sexual Revolution as a time when sex and love were accepted as being distinct and that STD epidemics were a product of this newfound freedom, not just within the LGBT community but everywhere. If one cares about one's partner or accepts sex as something that is "interpersonally meaningful," they argue, that should be motivation enough to use protection for the sake of both one's partner and oneself. The authors build on their feminist critique, claiming that the challenge facing the gay male community is to undo their "socialization as men" who are "trained to destroy" and to compete with one another and instead promote a community of people who take care of one another. Maybe, they argue, the goal of gay male liberation is to be able to love one's partner even when society teaches them not to. "Men loving men was the basis of gay male liberation, but we have now created 'cultural institutions' in which love or even affection can be totally avoided," they write. They also pose the question to their readers: "Have we modified the belief that we could dance our way to liberation into the belief that we could somehow fuck our way there?" They end with this statement: "If you Love the person you are fucking with – even for one night – you will not want to make them sick. Maybe affection is our best protection."

=== Conclusion ===
In the pamphlet's short section of "closing thoughts," the authors reiterate that "the party of the `70s is over" and that ignorance in the baths and backrooms has now turned into a form of oppression. They add that, because many members of the LGBT community are not well educated or able to afford successive healthcare visits, it's doubly important to disseminate correct, reliable information was widely as possible. Their final call is not for an end to sex, but an end to "sex without responsibility."

== Effects ==
Although MSM showed a wide range of responses to the epidemic in terms of sexual practices—some became celibate, others became monogamous, and many made no changes whatsoever—behavioral studies showed "dramatic declines" in risk-related sexual behavior in white gay men, as well as increased frequency in condom use (from 1% in 1981 to 70% in 1987), and the impetus for this change, particularly the increase in condom use, has been partially attributed to sex-positive educational materials like How to Have Sex in an Epidemic. The increasing practice of safe sex is reflected in HIV transmission statistics, which show a peak of new infection rates from between 1983–85, followed by a significant decrease in the following years. These trends were primarily seen in white MSM: infection rates in Black and Latino MSM continued to rise or stayed static in the later half of the 1980s. Gay rights activist and writer Jeffrey Escoffier summarizes the impact of this grassroots safe sex advocacy:

safer sex fairly quickly replaced 'easy sex' as the primary framework within which gay men conducted their sex lives. By and large, changes in gay sexual behavior originated in the dissemination of the safer sex framework within the community.

Even before mainstream, government-regulated condom campaigns became common in New York City (in the 1990s), the LGBT community began promoting condom use among its members to protect from AIDS. France recounts watching "a team of lesbians on a flatbed truck lovingly hurl the things [condoms] into the air like rose petals over the heads of their gay brothers" on Christopher Street. Condoms rose in popularity "as fast as Madonna's debut album" and it soon became common to see "Hudson River white fish"—i.e., used condoms floating in the river—in popular cruising spots for MSM. Condom sales spikes in the mid 80s (20% between 1986–1987) and companies began producing them in varying sizes, colors, and flavors and expanding their advertisements to appeal to gay men, among other demographics. Due to the awakening to safe sex in the LGBT community, condom use in San Francisco MSM between 1983 and 1987 quadrupled, and as a result, rectal gonorrhea diagnoses dropped significantly, up to 80% between 1983 and 1986 in a cohort of New York City primarily white MSM. Despite the lack of concrete statistics about the sexual practices of queer men in the 1980s, David France estimates that tens of thousands of lives were saved by the safe sex movement.

However, the authors of How to Have Sex also faced significant barriers in disseminating their message, most of which was due to their message's lack of popularity within the majority of the LGBT community. All of their applications for grants were rejected, and attempts to create a broader educational campaign built around the booklet's teachings were blocked by both the New York City government and organizations within the LGBT community. The Gay Men's Health Crisis offered to buy all 5,000 pamphlets and promote them, with the condition that any mentions of the multifactorial model be removed from the writing. The authors refused. Berkowitz said in an interview that it was "infuriating" that in 1985, the city still hadn't adopted any standard safe sex education.

The advent of safe sex in urban gay male populations came too late for many people: by 1983, more than 1,476 people had died from AIDS and David France estimated that as much as half of all MSM in New York City and San Francisco had been infected. Retrospective analysis by the CDC found that there were between 250,000–300,000 people living with HIV in the United States in 1983, and the number of people newly infected between 1983–1984 was around 150,000). However, the model set forth by Callen and Berkowitz at least provided the possibility of a "return to intimacy" for people with AIDS, which, despite being based on a now-defunct notion of how the syndrome arose, was important in combating the social death that many PWA faced after diagnosis.

How to Have Sex in an Epidemic was also credited with laying a foundation for safe sex education outside of the LGBT community. Duke Global Health Institute founder Michael Merson describes lessons from this grassroots movement—e.g. the importance of contraceptives over abstinence—as being key in "a generation of prevention approaches to follow," including PEPFAR (which was criticized for its emphasis on abstinence) and The Global Fund.

In 1983, it was generally accepted knowledge that AIDS was at least indirectly sexually transmitted. However, it was the stigma and lack of education around this fact that made the frankness and sex-positivity How to Have Sex in an Epidemic all the more important. The fact that the authors did not advocate for abstinence, were open to people's differing personal preferences, and emphasized that gay sex, anal-receptive sex in particular, was not dangerous or immoral in and of itself, made it much more effective and well-received by the gay community. According to Jeffrey Escoffier, given that many members of the LGBT community saw gay sex as transgressive and empowering, safe sex, particularly the use of condoms that had been traditionally seen as only necessary for heterosexual sex, was therefore a "normalization" of gay sex and a loss of gay power. Thus, safe sex education that did not detract from the uniqueness and power in gay sex was vital; Sonnabend himself recognizes that "perhaps the most valuable contribution of How to Have Sex in an Epidemic was its ability to propose condom use in a manner that was able to celebrate sex."

== Inaccuracies ==
In 1981, when Sonnabend was formulating the multifactorial theory of HIV/AIDS transmission, the available data did not clearly disprove either his model or the new agent theory, and there was no time to wait for the debate to be cleared up before offering concrete prevention methods. It was widely accepted that AIDS was sexually transmitted, and the fraught political environment made both models unappealing for different reasons. Sonnabend argued that "to propose without supporting evidence that any minority group might be carrying a potentially fatal new, mutant virus is unconscionable"; however, the multifactorial model also came under attack for being homophobic and moralistic in its approach to frequent and impersonal sex. Because the virus seemed almost entirely isolated to MSM in the early 1980s, it was difficult to see how and why a single virus would target a single demographic group. The new agent theory was adopted by the Gay Men's Health Crisis but was also, according to Callen and Berkowitz, a tool used by the religious right to justify homophobia and dialogues condemning sex outside of marriage, as well as a reflection of the "Western tradition of blaming calamity on the Third World."

Despite the fact that How to Have Sex in an Epidemic was based on incomplete knowledge of the causes of AIDS, the advice given in the 40 pages was relevant to HIV/AIDS prevention, at least when it comes to sex-related modes of transmission. Its central argument was to avoid getting semen and CMV in one's rectum, although, as the authors pointed out in the first section of the booklet, CMV could be substituted for the new, unidentified retrovirus that was hypothesized to cause AIDS.

However, there are several instances in which the advice is inaccurate and no longer a part of safe sex education. The authors put more emphasis than necessary on the lifestyle argument—that there are inherent behavioral patterns in the MSM community responsible for causing AIDS—and failed to recognize that a single exposure could result in infection. Under the multifactorial model, kissing a PWA, rimming and swallowing during oral sex all appear more risky than they actually are; on the other hand, having sex with a person with AIDS was more risky than the multifactorial theory suggested because a single contact can result in seroconversion. The multifactorial model was also unnecessarily critical of promiscuity (although the authors make sure to clarify that promiscuity is only problematic given high preexisting rates of STDs in the sexual network). In 2008, Sonnabend defended the pamphlet's focus on promiscuity, arguing that high quantities of unprotected sex were a "very significant health hazard" whether or not one put their faith in the multifactorial model, and, indeed, a high frequency of sexual encounters was still relevant given that it increased the probability of contact with an HIV+ person.

The multifactorial model also gave the authors and their writing a certain degree of hope that the endpoint to AIDS was not necessarily death (which it seemed to be at the time): they believed that stopping exposure to semen and CMV after infection could improve the health of the infected individual. The asymptomatic latency period had not yet been defined, and accounts of people with AIDS, including Berkowitz himself, maintaining a relatively healthy standard of living post-diagnosis convinced the authors of the importance of continued use of protection among people with AIDS who have sex. As is now common knowledge, once one has been infected with HIV it is almost impossible to completely rid one's body of the virus. However, the advice to continue using protection after being diagnosed was important in not only preventing future transmission to uninfected people but also to protecting the person with AIDS from being exposed to more pathogens through sex.

Historians, as well as the authors themselves, recognize that the creation of How to Have Sex in an Epidemic was only possible given their belief in the multifactorial model. Safe sex advocates would have been much less likely to propose condom use had they known that a single exposure was enough to contract HIV. For proponents of the single agent theory, "to suggest condom use would be tantamount to suggesting that one place a thin latex film between oneself and certain death," as Sonnabend put it. Following the discovery of the HIV and the almost unanimous acceptance of the single agent theory in the scientific community, the authors have acknowledged the inaccuracies in their safe sex manual, while pointing out its continued importance.

Berkowitz describes How to Have Sex in an Epidemic as being more conservative than it needed to be, given that it operated on the sole principle that gay men should avoid getting sperm in their own or their partner's rectum without knowing the other's status. He says, "at least we figured out very early that it was the recipient of anal sex that we needed to warn — and that we needed to celebrate."

== Publication and reception ==
=== Publication ===
After the pamphlet went through numerous drafts and editions, Callen and Berkowitz had difficulty finding somewhere to publish it, given its controversial subject matter and point of view. It was rejected by the Gay Men's Health Crisis, a prominent LGBT community health group that promoted the single virus theory, as well as by the state of New York when they reached out for help with publication. The authors collected donations from the LGBT community in New York City to fund the printing, and received a significant donation from philanthropist and HIV/AIDS activist Randall Klose. Callen even contributed his own tax refund to the cause. In May 1983, they ordered 5,000 copies from Tower Press and distributed the copies around gay social establishments in the city, including bars, bookstores, clubs and other shops. The copyright is attributed to "News From the Front Publications," which was created by Callen, Berkowitz and Sonnabend founded in 1983 for the very purpose of printing and distributing their booklet. This independent publication method reflects the grassroots, personal nature of the pamphlet: as Sonnabend wrote, "HTHS originated entirely in the community of people with and at risk for AIDS, from individuals with no organizational affiliation."

=== Reception ===
==== By the New York City LGBT community ====
How to Have Sex was met with a mixed response from its target audience (queer men/MSM) in New York City. Sales exceeded what the authors had expected, and within two weeks of the initial publication they had ordered a second batch, and, soon after, a third to meet popular demand. David France describes himself and his friends being "absorbed" by the material: "the pool table sat idle as a dozen of us passed around copies, hungry for guidance through the terror that sex was causing." It has been lauded as the "first sex-positive guide to practicing safe sex" and is widely regarded as revolutionizing the tone of safe sex education, particularly in the LGBT community. The only real sacrifices in behavior that it required were abstaining from substance use in sex-related situations, rather than abstinence from any form of sex itself. Most readers reacted well to the positive and casual tone of the writing, as well as the frank descriptions of sexual acts. Edmund White, author of The Joys of Gay Sex, said of the pamphlet: "this is the sanest, most sensible advice I've read yet about AIDS" and Dennis Altman, author of The Homosexualization of America said, "at last: a response to the effect of aids on our lives that goes beyond fears and myths to suggest positive actions." David France called it "a survival guide for the plague years." Many gay men were simply glad for any concrete advice in the midst of such confusion, particularly advice that did not present celibacy as the only safe option.

==== Controversy ====
As expected, How to Have Sex did receive significant criticism from other gay men and gay organizations for its critical take on promiscuity. Callen and Berkowitz had attempted to tone down their critical tone from their first major publication, "We Know Who We Are: Two Gay Men Declare War on Promiscuity" in a 1982 issue of the New York Native, which had harshly condemned the "excessiveness" and "pigging out" that was occurring in the gay nightclub scene. They incorporate consistent affirmation of gay sex throughout the forty pages, including sentences like the following:

As you read on, we hope we make at least one point clear: Sex doesn't make you sick — diseases do. Gay sex doesn't make you sick — gay men who are sick do.

Many gay community members and leaders saw the writing in How to Have Sex as moralistic and attributed the advice against some types of sex to internalized homophobia, self-hatred and an "anti-sexual sense of guilt." A response written by Michael Lynch and Bill Lewis in the Toronto Politic, a Canadian gay newspaper, criticized Callen and Berkowitz for blowing the epidemic out of proportion and allowing the medical community to "pathologize" gay men, and the authors faced frequent accusations of victim-blaming and siding with the religious right. It was not an easy message for some gay men to receive: in an interview for Berkowitz' biographical film, Sex Positive, Larry Kramer described it as a blast of "cold water in the face."

However, all three authors firmly believed in the importance of disseminating their message despite negative reactions. Callen wrote in his book Surviving AIDS that "to be attacked for trying to save the lives of others was deeply wounding. But we felt we had no choice." Sonnabend argued that political correctness and the "desire to be nonjudgemental" were beginning to interfere with medical practitioners' primary commitment to take care of their patients and was becoming a public health issue. Callen even applauded the negative responses to their advocacy published in the New York Native, because it ended up causing debate and dramatically widening the audience and popularity of How to Have Sex in an Epidemic. "It turns out historically to have been one of the advantages of our status as heretics," he was quoted saying in How to Survive a Plague.

Callen and Berkowitz do address the personal and political implications of their safe sex advice, specifically the loss of autonomy and joy the community might experience from having to police sexual behavior. In "We Know Who We Are" they wrote:

ultimately, it may be more important to let people die in pursuit of their own happiness than to limit personal freedom by regulating risk.

==== By the straight community ====
In his memoir, Berkowitz wrote, "there was little chance we would water down our safe sex manifesto to make it more presentable for the general public in the Reagan era." Although he and Callen both stressed that How to Have Sex in an Epidemic was not intended for straight audiences, its popularity and importance as a foundational safe sex manifesto ensured that it got at least some level of attention beyond the LGBT community of New York City. According to the London School of Hygiene and Tropical Medicine archives, the pamphlet was purchased by numerous public libraries (twelve known examples) and universities, as well as seven known high schools, a surprising number of which were in traditionally conservative states that still had functioning sodomy laws. The frank description of gay sex did not seem to dissuade more mainstream institutions, although it is unclear whether they were aware of the explicit content of the manual before purchasing it.

The primary readership of How to Have Sex in an Epidemic was still gay men in New York City, but knowledge of the work spread to people of all sexualities around the country, and even, in some cases, internationally. Soon after its initial publication, the booklet was given a review in the New York Review of Books, and later a newscaster came from West Germany to interview the authors about their work. Callen, Berkowitz and Sonnabend also received response letters from around the country and from international readers.

== Historical significance ==
Social scientists have credited How to Have Sex in an Epidemic and a 1982 pamphlet called Play Fair! by the Sisters of Perpetual Indulgence as the first literature to recommend safe sex as a strategy for reducing the risk of contracting the transmitting agent which causes AIDS. A similar AIDS education manual, entitled "Can We Talk?" was published by the Harvey Milk LGBT Democratic Club in San Francisco at the beginning of 1983, although it is less often credited as being foundational for safe sex.

=== For HIV/AIDS Activism and Gay Politics ===
Despite the negative press that How to Have Sex received for what many perceived as a criticism of promiscuity, many queer theorists have acknowledged the importance of the pamphlet and others like it to the evolution of the broader LGBT rights movement. The politics at the time were fraught, and the AIDS epidemic revealed what Callen and Berkowitz described as the danger of having "a positive political force [i.e. the LGBT liberation] tied to a dangerous lifestyle [i.e. promiscuity without condom use]." The viewpoint presented in the booklet is one that attempted to challenge the institutions that had arisen in the urban gay male community, including bathhouses and backrooms, that had an economic "stake in keeping us promiscuous," according to the authors. There was a common notion in the community at the time that STDs were supposed to be what Edmund White called "red badges of courage in a war against a sex negative society," but as the cost of life from these diseases rose, members of that same community saw the need to change practices to make sex safer, and How to Have Sex is a result of that phenomenon. Thus, it is part of the shift in behavior and mentality from the 70s to the 80s resulting directly from the AIDS epidemic. The following quote from "We Know Who We Are" demonstrates the authors' call to action:

The motto of promiscuous gay men has been 'so many men, so little time.' In the `70s we worried about so many men; in the `80s we will have to worry about so little time. For us, the party that was the `70s is over. For some, perhaps, homosexuality may always mean promiscuity. They may very well die for that belief. The last 13 years since Stonewall have demonstrated tremendous change. So must the next 13 years.

=== For the People With AIDS Self-Empowerment Movement ===
Along with buddy programs, The Denver Principles, the San Francisco model of care, and activism occurring around the country, pamphlets like How to have Sex and Play Fair! have been described as key elements of the People With AIDS Self-Empowerment Movement. Sonnabend called the method presented in the manual a "do it yourself" approach that "did not wait for others to take care of pressing needs." As Berkowitz explained, having the power to control one's sex life and to prevent oneself from getting sick was the essence of self-empowerment at a time when AIDS was taking away gay men's sexual freedom and ability to enact a rebellion against heteronormativity through sex.

=== For Safe Sex ===
Along with Play Fair!, How to have Sex was among the first safe sex educational materials produced and widely disseminated that addressed the subject in a positive and affirming light. David France described the authors' method and aims to modify the behaviors of an entire subculture as something so radical that, had they discussed its feasibility with social scientists beforehand, they might have been dissuaded from attempting it. That said, Berkowitz has lamented that the grassroots origins of safe sex were rapidly forgotten as it became increasingly touted as an invention from experts in the scientific community.

=== For Public Health ===
How to Have Sex in an Epidemic is evidence of a larger trend occurring in the 1980s and 1990s in which the impetus for treatment and prevention for HIV/AIDS came directly from the infected communities. As Alan Brandt argues, the AIDS epidemic did more than any other to blur the line between the healthcare field and the people they treated; community-based care became a central model for public and global health efforts related to this particular disease. Social scientists have recognized the importance of "vernacular knowledge" from within the gay community, such as the vocabulary used in How to Have Sex in an Epidemic being brought into a broader epidemiological/scientific context, because it was this intimate knowledge of sexual behavior among MSM that gave Callen and Berkowitz the authority to address the subject and the ability to do so in a way that appealed to their audience and avoided condescension. Queer theorist Douglas Crimp wrote:

We [gay men] were able to invent safe sex because we have always known that sex is not, in an epidemic or not, limited to penetrative sex. Our promiscuity taught us many things, not only about the pleasures of sex, but about the great multiplicity of those pleasures.

On a practical level, this sort of grassroots prevention advocacy was necessary because, in the early years of the epidemic when little was known about transmission and AIDS panic was highly prevalent, many mainstream medical institutions refused to offer care to people with AIDS or did so in a substandard manner. Both the booklet itself and the partnership of the contributors (i.e., between Callen, Berkowitz and Sonnabend) helped lay the foundation for greater collaboration between scientists and the affected communities they study.

How to have Sex in an Epidemic was an important medical text in that it gave straight healthcare professionals and mainstream institutions more in depth knowledge of gay culture in general, and sexual culture of MSM specifically, including a variety of niche sex acts. This information was critical for practitioners and researchers in their attempts to understand the risks associated with contracting HIV.

== In the media ==
- How to Have Sex in an Epidemic is featured in the second episode of the fifth season of the podcast Fiasco, hosted by Leon Neyfakh.
