= Shanti Project =

American non-profit organization

The Shanti Project is a non-profit human services agency based in San Francisco and founded in 1974 by Dr. Charles Garfield in Berkeley, CA. Its goals are to provide peer support and guidance to people affected by HIV/AIDS, cancer, and other life-threatening conditions. Since its inception, several organizations adhering to the Shanti model have been created in the United States, including projects in Los Angeles, California, Seattle, Washington and Laguna Beach, California.

Shanti Project began providing its first AIDS specific services in 1981 and became solely an AIDS service organization in 1984. In 2001 the organization also began serving Women with breast cancer in addition to people who are HIV+. Then in 2013, renamed the Women's Cancer Project for Margot Murphy because of a funding source secured through the generous family of Margot Murphy. In November, 2015 Shanti opened their services up to Women with any type of cancer.

== History ==
In December 1981, director Jim Geary and Steve Peskind, co-founder of the Buddhist AIDS Project, started the first known Kaposi’s Sarcoma support group. Group members Bobbi Campbell, Bobby Reynolds, and people with AIDS (PWA) activist Dan Turner contributed to the movement that created the foundational Denver Principles, listing recommendations and rights. This work led to the formation of the movement and groups such as ACT-UP and the People with AIDS Coalition.Helen Schietinger, nurse coordinator of an AIDS clinic at the University of San Francisco, was the Shanti Project's first residence program director.

== The Shanti Model ==
Shanti is a Sanskrit word meaning "inner peace" or "tranquility" and all of Shanti's direct service and educational programs are aimed at easing the burdens and improving the well-being of people in difficult life situations.The Shanti model of peer support is built upon several services

- mutual respect
- positive regard
- empowerment of the client (the assumption that the client has the solutions to his or her own problems and does not need your advice or direction)
- genuineness (being oneself, authenticity)
- acceptance of differences (does not mean agreement, but acceptance based on respect)
- empathy (allowing oneself to feel with another person)
- intention to be of service

== Shanti Project Collection ==
In 1999 Badman Recording Co. released a compact disc featuring various artists, titled Shanti Project Collection. A portion of the proceeds from the sale of the CD were donated to the Shanti Project. It has since been followed up with two more collections.
