= Think Positive =

Lebanese HIV/AIDS activist organization

- Founded: 2009
- Type: Non-profit
- Location: Beirut
- Region served: Lebanon

“Think Positive” is a Lebanese association (registration number 958) established in 2009. It started its activities with fighting HIV/AIDS, Drug Use, Sexually Transmitted Diseases and Stigma and Discrimination.

== Vision ==
Think Positive aims at counseling youths, women, and marginalized groups (people living with HIV/AIDS, people who use drugs, men who have sex with men, and female sex workers) in the Lebanese society.

== "HIV+ Phobia" campaign ==
The organization started implementing the activities of its regional campaign against “HIV+ Phobia” on October 15, 2009 in Lebanon, Jordan and Saudi Arabia.

== Goals ==
Think Positive aims to empower its target groups to be highly active in the social and health care systems at national level.

== Programs ==
- HIV/AIDS & STD’s Program.
- Social and Behavioral Empowerment Program.
- “Celebrating our Rights” Program.
- “Communicating Human Rights” Program.

== Services ==
- Capacity Building and Training Sessions.
- Social Media Training Sessions.
- Counseling.
- Voluntary Counseling and Testing.

== See also ==
- People With AIDS — self-empowering movement
- AIDS advocacy
- HIV and AIDS misconceptions
