= Play Fair! =

1982 AIDS brochure

- Authors: The San Francisco Order of the Sisters of Perpetual Indulgence
- Language: English
- Subject: Safe sex
- Publication date: 1982
- Publication place: United States
- Media type: Print

Play Fair! was a landmark brochure produced by the San Francisco Order of the Sisters of Perpetual Indulgence, and it was a key method of combating the emerging AIDS crisis. Play Fair! is credited as the first pamphlet to focus on safer sex, helping invent modern safe sex. One of the authors of the publication was public health nurse and AIDS activist Bobbi Campbell (a.k.a. Sister Florence Nightmare) who would go on to appear on the cover of the August 8, 1983 issue of Newsweek.

== Background ==
=== Sisters of Perpetual Indulgence ===
On Easter weekend in 1979, Ken Bunch, Fred Brungard, and Baruch Golden wore nun's habits and walked around San Francisco's Castro district and a nearby nude beach. The Castro was one of the U.S.'s hubs of gay culture at the time, but its fashion was one of bland masculinity, with a stereotype of being filled with "Castro clones" who all wore jeans and muscle shirts. Perhaps due to this contrast, and the power of the symbolism of the Catholic Church being used for drag, the trio's walk through the Castro electrified onlookers, "like someone had lit a stick of dynamite."

Bunch and Brungard had previously been classmates and co-chairs of the Gay Liberation Front chapter at the University of Iowa, where they and their friends had formed a drag troupe called the Sugar Plum Fairies. They had incorporated caked-on makeup and nun's habits into their acts, and the habits were in fact the only costumes Bunch kept when moving to San Francisco. After the pair and Golden realized the impact of their Easter weekend walk, they repeated public performances as nuns, and soon turned their act into a group, the Sisters of Perpetual Indulgence, that could be used for fun social activism. The organization rapidly produced fundraisers, protests, and performances using parodies of religious iconography, and by 1981 were labeled "ubiquitous" by the San Francisco Examiner. The group grew quickly during this time, adding new members in San Francisco and offshoot chapters in cities around the world.

=== Beginning of the HIV/AIDS pandemic ===
In the early 1980s, the HIV/AIDS pandemic started spreading across major U.S. cities, with doctors starting to identify two of its symptoms: Kaposi's Sarcoma and pneumocystis pneumonia. Researchers noted that many patients were gay men or used intravenous drugs, but knew little about the underlying illness. By 1982, some researchers had named the underlying condition Gay-Related Immune Deficiency ("GRID"), but later that year, they broadened the name to Acquired Immune Deficiency Syndrome ("AIDS").

By 1982, many members of the LGBTQ community were dying from the pandemic, yet they had few resources for help, with little governmental or media support. Sister Soami of the Sisters of Perpetual Indulgence recounted that in 1982, "we just knew something was happening, something sexually related." At the time, gay men's culture in U.S. cities celebrated sex and even disdained safer sex practices, since many known STIs were curable and the community was creating a culture of pride in the face of past oppression. These years also followed the broader sexual revolution and a period of U.S. drug culture, especially during parties: all these factors spread the pandemic rapidly.

In addition to the devastation that the HIV/AIDS pandemic brought to LGBTQ communities, its media coverage increased bigotry towards these communities. Because AIDS was first labeled GRID, public discussion of it blamed LGBTQ people for the disease. Symptoms were derided as "gay cancer" or "gay pneumonia," and the White House press secretary would make homophobic jokes when reporters asked about the pandemic. This stereotype became long-lasting in popular opinion, and was weaponized to fuel homophobia, transphobia, and biphobia.

== Creation ==
The Sisters wanted to support the LGBTQ community during the HIV/AIDS pandemic, especially because normal support systems like the government, churches, media, and families were actively pushing LGBTQ people away and deriding the pandemic. As the pandemic grew, the Sisters focused more resources on fighting it, supporting healthcare for community members, and promoting practical, joyful methods of staying safe during an overwhelming pandemic. From the beginning, the Sisters had been motivated by battling public bigotry, as well as internalized blame. They emphasized this in their mission "to promulgate universal joy and to expiate stigmatic guilt." Many of their educational and supportive campaigns thus focused on sex-positive, self-accepting and funny ways to battle stigma and illness.

Early members of the Sisters had healthcare expertise, and wanted to help gay men limit their exposure to the little-understood HIV/AIDS pandemic, as well as other STIs. Sister Florence Nightmare, RN (Bobbi Campbell) and Sister Roz Erection (Baruch Golden) were both public health nurses, and wanted to create a guide to safer sex that gay men would willingly read and learn from. Campbell had already developed lesions from Kaposi's Sarcoma by this time. The pair decided to make a funny and sex-positive guide for others, in line with the Sister's mission, and as a pragmatic way to increase its usefulness.

The two sisters developed the pamphlet in 1982, working with sisters Lida Dogslife, Blue Nun, Marie EverReady, and Francis Diana, with Sister Mary Media handling its design. They also recruited a doctor, William Olden and a cartoonist from Body Politic, Gary Ostrom. This became Play Fair! and was the first safer-sex pamphlet designed by gay men for gay men. In the pamphlet, the creators thank Jim Gilman and Hal Slate of the Caldron for fundraising, publisher Peter G. Frisch and John Knoebel of The Advocate for financial advice and support, Mark Thompson for advertising, Anderson Graphics for technical support, and ten organizations and individuals for their financial support. The creators raised funds themselves to print the pamphlets, and distributed 16,000 free copies during a parade for San Francisco's Gay Freedom Day on June 27, 1982. The Sisters called their actions that day the "Mass in a Time of War against V.D."

== Contents ==
The pamphlet is 4 pages long, colored in black, white, and pink. It promotes medically-supported safer-sex practices, promoting sex-positive strategies, condom use, STI education, and stigma reduction. The pamphlet uses humor and comics of nuns as a strategy for education.

The pamphlet begins with a note from the Sisters of Perpetual Indulgence to the gay male community. The story starts by saying that several months before, Mother Superior had noticed many members of the Sisters getting sick, and realized that they had contracted "numerous sexually transmitted diseases." Although the nuns had not realized the root cause of their illnesses, they now needed to learn how to change their behaviors to keep the community healthier. The note then lists a number of known STIs, as well as two symptoms of HIV/AIDS, without naming them as such, calling them "mysterious forms of cancer and pneumonia." Finally, the note states:

We are giving these diseases to ourselves and each other through selfishness and ignorance. We are destroying ourselves. Please read this pamphlet, and become aware, become responsible, and share the knowledge with your friends.

On page two, the pamphlet lists out "Mother Superior's Recommendations to Help Create a Disease-Free Convent and Community", with a list of practices to follow, including condom usage, STI testing, and hygienic measures, as well as practices to avoid, including anonymous sex and douching. It recommends 15 "gay-sensitive" clinics in San Francisco where STIs can be diagnosed or treated, along with recommendations for where to go for various STIs. It also includes a disclaimer that the brochure is targeted at the gay male community, and not "intended to relate to the situation for women." Finally, it acknowledges the creators and supporters of the pamphlet.

The last two pages explain a number of STIs. Each section begins with a story about a Sister who supposedly contracted the STI in question, then listing out its symptoms, when symptoms appear, how the STI is contracted, what happens if it's left untreated, and the cure. The "STIs" included are gonorrhea, non-gonococcal or non-specific urethritis, syphilis, herpes simplex, venereal warts, scabies, crabs, intestinal parasites, hepatitis A and B, Kaposi’s sarcoma and pneumocystis pneumonia, and guilt. Guilt is the one exception to physical conditions on the list, and the pamphlet explains that its symptoms appear "from 2 to 3 years of age and persist in many cases throughout life," with the cure being "respect and love yourself and others." This is the final sentence of the pamphlet, along with a comic captioned: "Mother Superior wants all Sisters to report for Guilt Disposal Duty, on the double."

== Legacy ==
=== The Sisters' safer sex education ===
The pamphlet was unique at the time for using humor and sex-positivity to promote safer sex practices, rather than focusing on abstinence. It was the start of the Sisters' focused efforts to combat the HIV/AIDS pandemic, which became a core part of their service. This included one of the earliest HIV/AIDS fundraisers in 1982, and the first candlelight vigil for AIDS awareness in 1983.

In the 1980s, other chapters of the Sisters produced their own educational pamphlets in similar styles. The Toronto chapter produced versions called Cum Clean, illustrated with new comics and cover photos of the nuns, as well as updating the section on AIDS. The Sisters distribute these pamphlets for free, often with condoms and lube. In later years they added "bliss kits" to be more inclusive of other bodies and sexual activities. The Sisters also quickly expanded their safer sex educational efforts beyond pamphlets. The Toronto chapter designed "Perpetually Indulgent Rainchecks" to destigmatize discussing STI checkups and safer sex while waiting for results.

In 1999, for the Sisters' 20th anniversary, the San Francisco chapter revised Play Fair! to be inclusive to all genders and body types. In 2002, the Abbey of St. Joan in Seattle took charge of pamphlet publication, with the London House of Common Sluts starting publication of its own version in 2009.

=== Impact and legacy ===
Play Fair! is generally credited as having invented "so-called safe sex" along with a manual from the following year: How to Have Sex in an Epidemic: One Approach. Play Fair! has also been labeled "the first safer sex pamphlet" "the first safer-sex guide designed for gay men by gay men" and "the first safer sex pamphlet anywhere in the world to use plain sex-positive language, practical advice, and humour."

A founder of the Sisters considered "Play Fair!" to be "one of the Order's greatest achievements in community education and support".

== See also ==
- Sisters of Perpetual Indulgence
- How To Have Sex in an Epidemic
