= Michael Callen =

American writer, musician and AIDS activist (1955–1993)

- Born: April 11, 1955; Rising Sun, Indiana, United States
- Died: December 27, 1993 (aged 38); Los Angeles, California, United States
- Cause of death: AIDS-related complications
- Occupations: Musician, author, and AIDS activist
- Known for: Early AIDS activist

Michael Callen (April 11, 1955 – December 27, 1993) was an American singer, songwriter, composer, author, and AIDS activist. Callen was diagnosed with AIDS in 1982 and became a pioneer of AIDS activism in New York City, working closely with his doctor, Dr. Joseph Sonnabend, and Richard Berkowitz. Together, they published articles and pamphlets to raise awareness about the correlation between risky sexual behaviors and AIDS.

As a major contributor to the foundation of AIDS activism, specifically activism from People With AIDS, Callen helped draft unprecedented documents such as How to Have Sex in an Epidemic: One Approach, and The Denver Principles. In addition to his written work, Callen was a leader and founder of activist organizations including The People with AIDS Coalition and the Community Research Initiative. As a musician, he was a member of the openly gay and politically active a cappella quintet The Flirtations and released two solo albums: Purple Heart in 1988 and Legacy in 1996. He consistently spoke out for AIDS activists and gay and lesbian organizations and made frequent speaking and performance appearances. Callen remained a primary public figure in AIDS activism until he died at age 38 from AIDS-related complications of pulmonary Kaposi's sarcoma at Midway Hospital Medical Center in Los Angeles, California. In Love Don't Need a Reason, biographer Matthew Jones wrote that Callen requested that Douglas Sadownick and Tim should be granted power of attorney over him.

== AIDS activist ==
=== Activism with Sonnabend, Berkowitz, and Dworkin ===
In 1982, Callen joined with fellow person with AIDS Richard Berkowitz and partner Richard Dworkin to write an essay entitled "We Know Who We Are: Two Gay Men Declare War on Promiscuity" for the New York Native. Inspired by Dr. Joseph Sonnabend's theory, the men suggested closing the baths as a way to stop the spread of AIDS. What the men referred to as "promiscuity" was the frequent backroom, unprotected sexual encounters that dominated the gay sexual culture of the time and place. In the post-Stonewall Riots and gay liberation years, the popular belief was that sex was a revolutionary act, and more sex was equivalent to being more liberated.

Callen co-authored the manual How to Have Sex in an Epidemic: One Approach, which was developed in collaboration with Berkowitz and Sonnabend in 1983. The authors outlined the tenets of safe sex, advocating for the increased use of condoms. Prior to the AIDS epidemic, condoms were advertised as a viable way to prevent pregnancy but not considered an effective tool for STD prevention.

In 1990, Callen wrote Surviving AIDS, which received an Honorable Mention from the American Medical Writers Association. In Surviving AIDS, Callen exposes what he calls the "propaganda of hopelessness", arguing that public health officials and researchers are more interested in the dead than the living, ultimately largely ignoring long-term survivors. The latter half of the book tells the story of 13 long-term survivors, including people of different sexes, ethnic, and sexual backgrounds.

=== Opposition ===
Despite his career and prominence as an activist, Callen was met with resentment, suspicion and opposition from others. Since he was diagnosed with AIDS in 1982 and survived over a decade, people speculated as to whether his diagnosis was real or fabricated to get attention. He responded to that criticism by releasing his medical reports and pictures of his lungs which showed his pulmonary Kaposi's Sarcoma. Additionally, Callen stood by his belief in the multifactorial theory when there was scientific proof that HIV was the cause of AIDS.

Callen openly questioned the HIV theory of AIDS and was especially critical of AZT monotherapy when it was first introduced: "The HIV paradigm has produced nothing of value for my life and I actually believe that treatments based on the arrogant belief that HIV has proven to be the sole and sufficient cause of AIDS has hastened the deaths of many of my friends."

=== Honors ===
In June 2019, Callen was one of the inaugural fifty American "pioneers, trailblazers, and heroes" inducted on the National LGBTQ Wall of Honor within the Stonewall National Monument (SNM) in New York City's Stonewall Inn. The SNM is the first U.S. national monument dedicated to LGBTQ rights and history, and the wall's unveiling was timed to take place during the 50th anniversary of the Stonewall riots.

Approximately five years after Callen's death, the Community Health Project (CHP), a primary care center located in New York City that serves the needs of the LGBT community and people living with HIV/AIDS, was renamed to the Callen-Lorde Community Health Center after Callen and activist Audre Lorde.

== Performance career ==
Michael Callen briefly was the lead of the a cappella group Mike & the Headsets. In 1982, Callen, along with Janet Cleary, Pamela Brandt, and Richard Dworkin formed a queer rock-and-roll band called Low Life. After Low Life disbanded, Callen's solo album Purple Heart was released and quickly acclaimed as a staple of gay men's music.

He was a founding member of the gay male a cappella singing group The Flirtations, with whom he recorded two albums. He also had a solo album, Purple Heart, which a review in The Advocate called "the most remarkable gay independent release of the past decade." Callen recorded two albums with The Flirtations, as well as a double disc album, Legacy, which was released by Significant Other Records in 1996 after Callen's death.

Additionally, Callen made cameo appearances in the films Philadelphia (1993) and Zero Patience (1993), in which he famously performed a song in falsetto as the fictitious "Miss HIV".

In partnership with Oscar winner Peter Allen and Marsha Melamet, Callen wrote his most famous song, "Love Don't Need a Reason", commissioned by Larry Kramer for his play, The Normal Heart. The song was introduced at a 1986 AIDS Walk and was performed frequently at gay pride and AIDS-related events around the country. The song has been covered by numerous gay men's choirs as well as the Peter Allen Broadway musical The Boy From Oz (1998).

== Bibliography ==
- 1983: How to Have Sex in an Epidemic: One Approach (co-author)
- 1990: Surviving AIDS (author)

== Discography ==
=== Albums ===
as part of The Flirtations

- The Flirtations (1990)
- The Flirtations: Live Out on the Road (1991)
- Feeding The Flame: Songs By Men to End AIDS (1992)

Solo

- Purple Heart (1988)
- Legacy (1996) – a 2-CD album (posthumously)

== Filmography ==
- Zero Patience (1993) – Miss HIV
- Philadelphia (1993) – The Flirtations (final film role)

== See also ==
- Callen-Lorde Community Health Center, an organization in New York City named for Michael Callen and Audre Lorde.
- ACRIA – organization co-founded by Callen and Joseph Sonnabend.
