= The Flirtations (group) =

American acapella group

- Origin: United States
- Genre: a cappella
- Years active: 1988–1997
- Past members: Jon Arterton; Michael Callen; Aurelio Font; TJ Myers; Eliot Pilshaw; Jimmy Rutland; Suede; Cliff Townsend

The Flirtations were an American pro-LGBT, male a cappella musical group active from 1988 to 1997. The original members were co-founders Jon Arterton and Elliot Pilshaw, Michael Callen, Aurelio Font and TJ Myers. On the Out On the Road album they were joined by Cliff Townsend and Jimmy Rutland. The group later reconfigured: for the album Three, Jon Arterton and Jimmy Rutland were joined by Suede.

Their music provided an opportunity for both a celebration of gay culture and a call to arms in the battle against AIDS and homophobia. Two of the group's original members died from AIDS: TJ Myers in 1989 and gay activist Michael Callen in 1993. The Flirtations performed at a number of prominent national venues including Carnegie Hall, and performed a song in the party scene of the film Philadelphia.

They also performed on a number of television shows including Good Morning America, The Phil Donohue Show, HBO's documentary Why Am I Gay?, and In the Life. In the course of their ten-year career they performed with fourteen different incarnations. Arterton was the group's main arranger and the only singer to participate in the group's entire career.

== Discography ==
- 1990: The Flirtations
- 1993: Live: Out on the Road
- 1996: Three

The Flirtations contributed one cut each to the following collections:

- 1992: Feeding The Flame: Songs By Men to End AIDS (The Flirt Song - by The Flirtations - Track 8 and Crazy World - by Michael Callen - Track 9)
- 1995: A love worth fighting for A celebration of gay and lesbian singers and songwriters, Volume one. (Angels, Punks And Raging Queens - The Flirtations - Track 12)
- 1995: Winter moon. A celebration of gay and lesbian singers and songwriters and friends, Volume two. (Do Not Turn Away - Michael Callen - Track 8 and Everything Possible - The Flirtations - Track 14)

== Further reading and viewing ==
- Jones, Matthew J., The Boys in the Girl Group: The Flirtations and the Queer Politics of A Cappella.
- Jones, Matthew J. (2016). ""Something Inside So Strong": The Flirtations and the Queer Politics of A Cappella". Journal of Popular Music Studies. 28 (2): 142–185. doi:10.1111/jpms.12168..
- Youtube Playlist of Flirtations and Michael Callen Videos
- KATHLEEN MEGAN, THE HARTFORD COURANT, KEEPING THE `SPIRIT' ALIVE, April 23, 2007
