= Safe sex =

Ways to reduce the risk of acquiring STIs

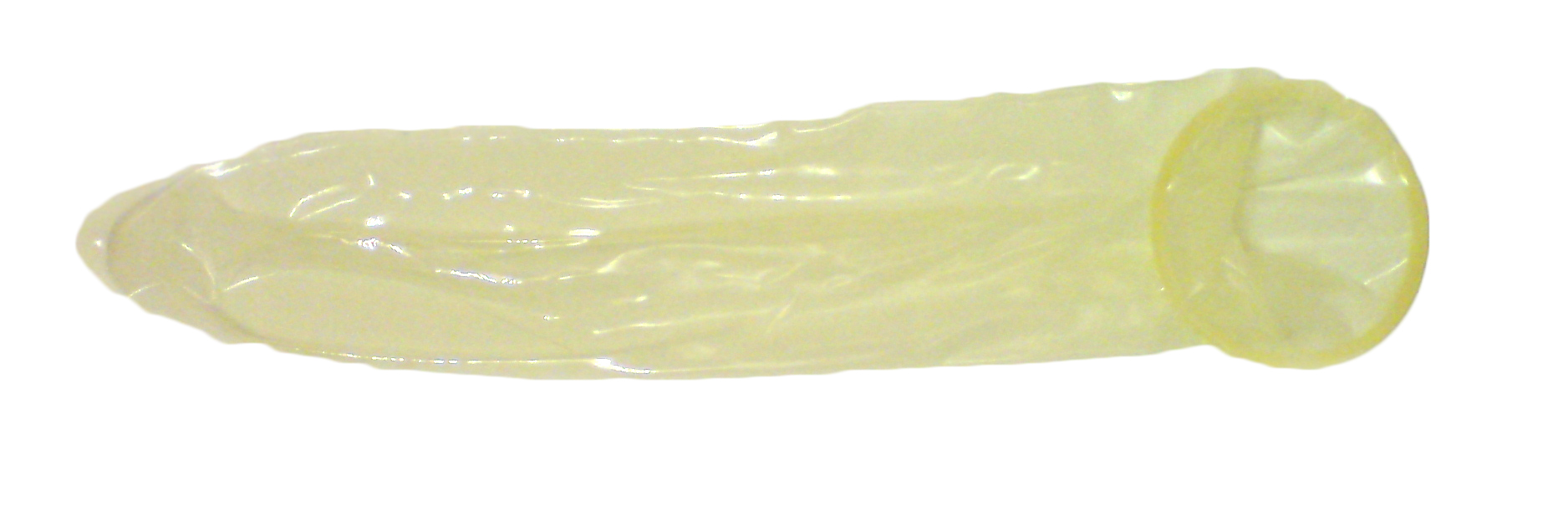
Male (or "external") condoms can be used to cover the penis for safer sex during vaginal or anal insertion or fellatio.

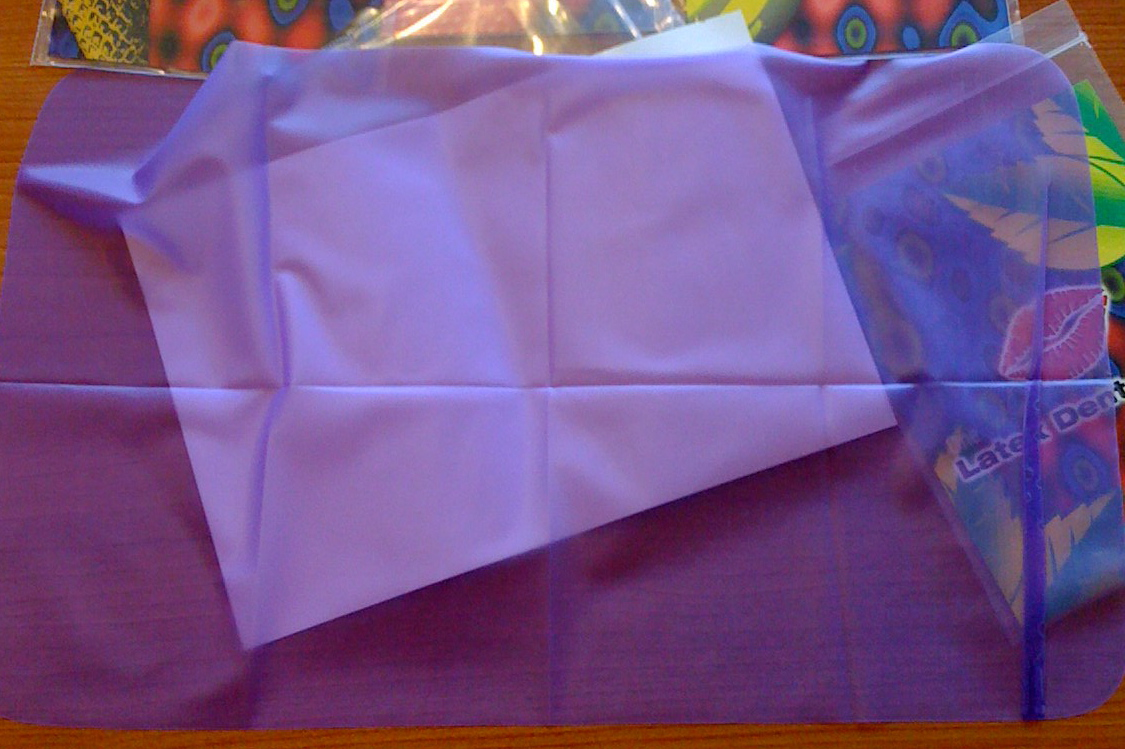
Dental dams can be used to cover the vulva or anus when engaging in cunnilingus or anilingus, respectively, for safer sex.

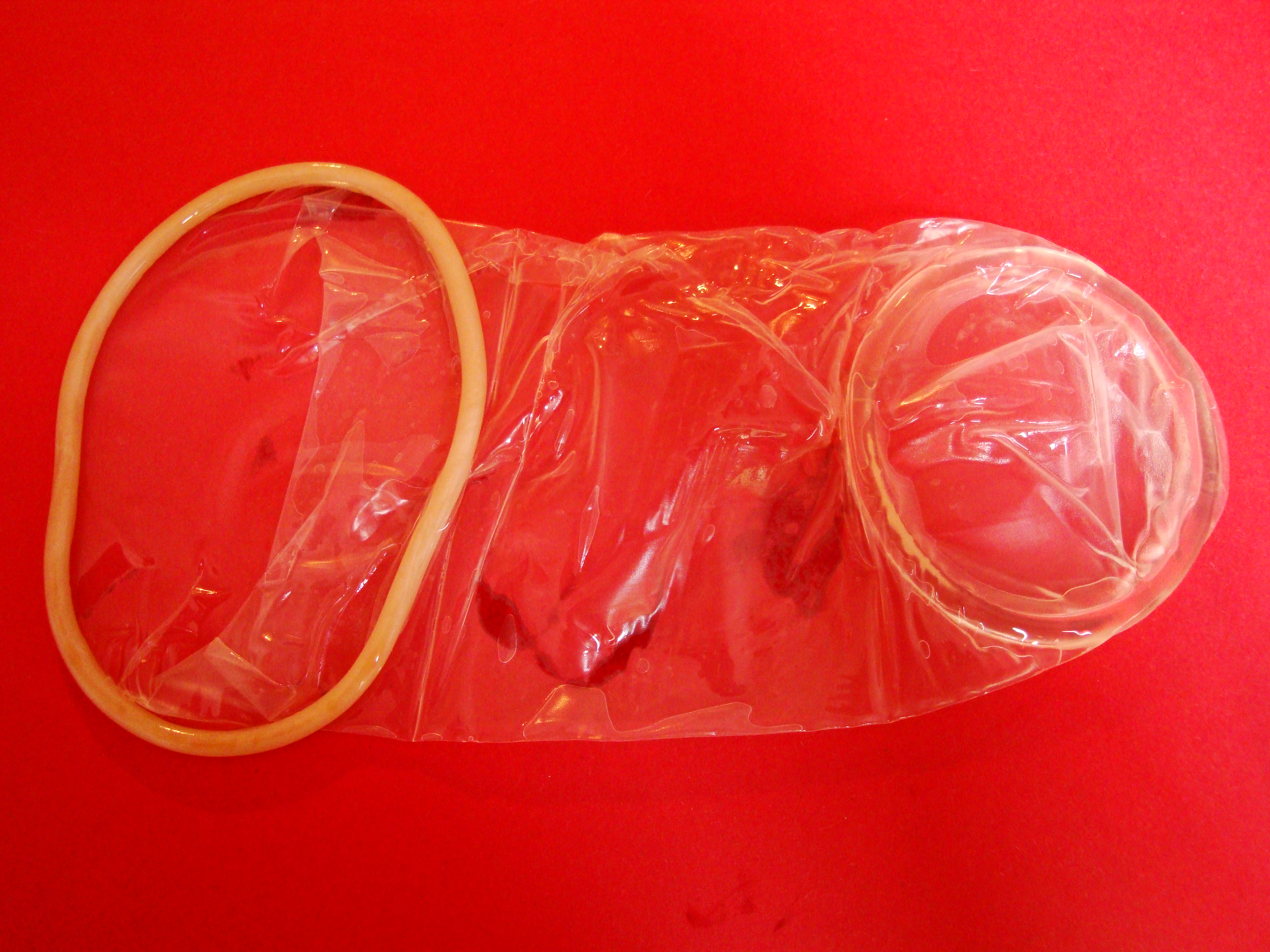
Internal condoms, also known as female condoms, can be used by receptive partners for safer sex.

Safe sex is sexual activity using protective methods or contraceptive devices (such as condoms) to reduce the risk of transmitting or acquiring sexually transmitted infections (STIs), especially HIV. The terms safer sex and protected sex are sometimes preferred, to indicate that even highly effective prevention practices do not eliminate all possible risks. It is also sometimes used colloquially to describe methods aimed at preventing pregnancy that may or may not also lower STI risks.

The concept of safe sex emerged in the 1980s as a response to the global AIDS epidemic, and possibly more specifically to the AIDS crisis in the United States. Promoting safe sex is now one of the main aims of sex education and STI prevention, especially reducing new HIV infections. Safe sex is regarded as a harm reduction strategy aimed at reducing the risk of STI transmission.

Although some safe sex practices (like condoms) can also be used as birth control (contraception), most forms of contraception do not protect against STIs. Likewise, some safe sex practices, such as partner selection and low-risk sex behavior, might not be effective forms of contraception.

== History ==
Death rates from unsafe sex gbd

Although strategies for avoiding STIs like syphilis and gonorrhea have existed for centuries and the term safe sex existed in English as early as the 1930s, the use of the term to refer to STI-risk reduction dates to the mid-1980s in the United States. It emerged in response to the HIV/AIDS crisis.

A year before the HIV virus was isolated and named, the San Francisco chapter of the Sisters of Perpetual Indulgence published a small pamphlet titled Play Fair! out of concern over widespread STIs among the city's gay male population. It specifically named illnesses (Kaposi's sarcoma and pneumocystis pneumonia) that would later be understood as symptoms of advanced HIV disease (AIDS). The pamphlet advocated a range of safe-sex practices, including abstinence, condoms, personal hygiene, use of personal lubricants, and STI testing/treatment. It took a casual, sex-positive approach while also emphasizing personal and social responsibility. In May 1983—the same month HIV was isolated and named in France—the New York City-based HIV/AIDS activists Richard Berkowitz and Michael Callen published similar advice in their booklet, How to Have Sex in an Epidemic: One Approach. Both publications included recommendations that are now standard advice for reducing STI (including HIV) risks.

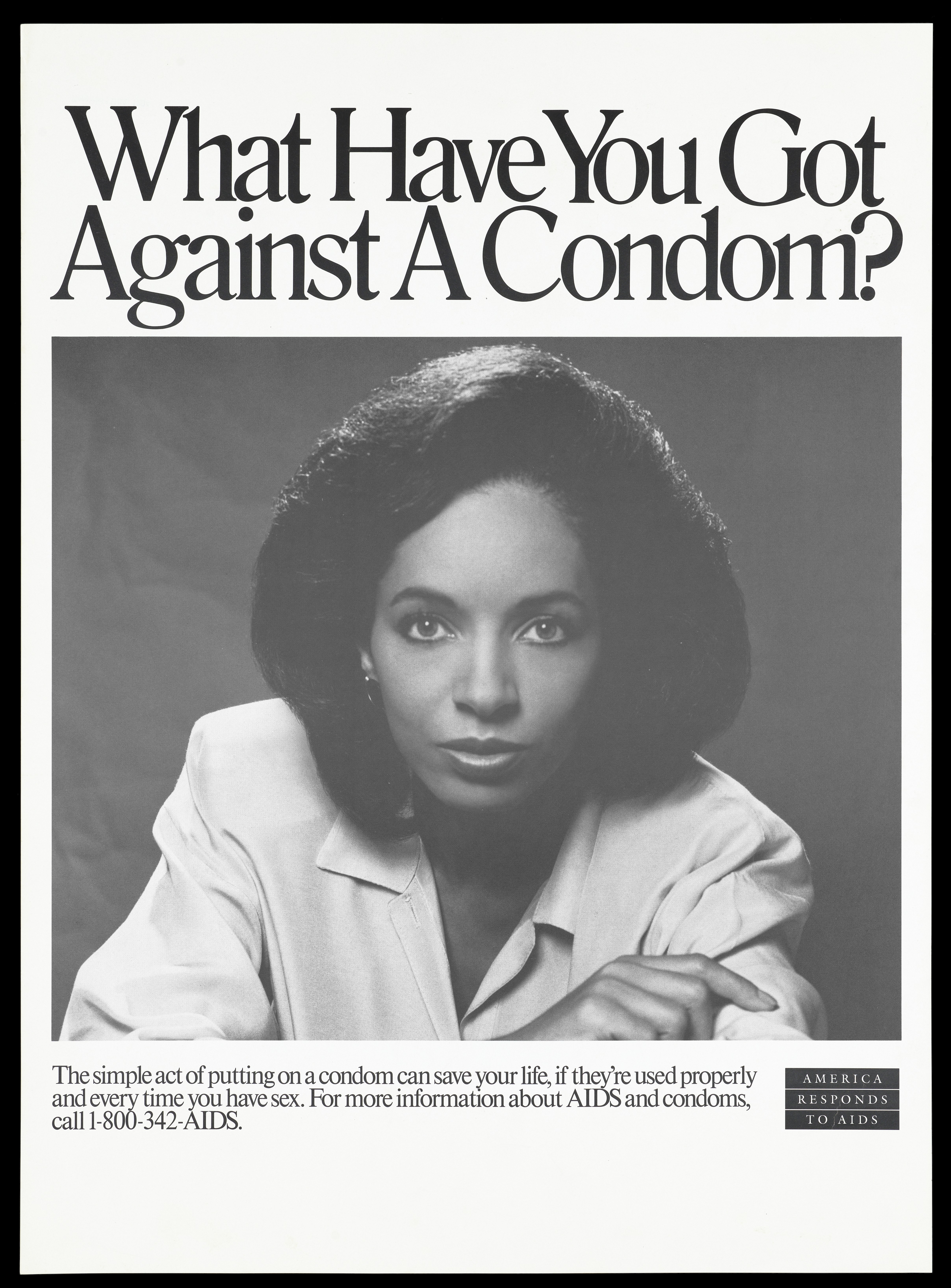
A poster promotes condom use.

Safe sex as a form of STI risk reduction appeared in journalism as early as 1984, in the British publication The Daily Intelligencer: "The goal is to reach about 50 million people with messages about safe sex and AIDS education."

Although safe sex is used by individuals to refer to protection against both pregnancy and HIV/AIDS or other STI transmissions, the term was born in response to the HIV/AIDS epidemic. It is believed that the term safe sex was used in the professional literature in 1984, in the content of a paper on the psychological effect that HIV/AIDS may have on gay and bisexual men.

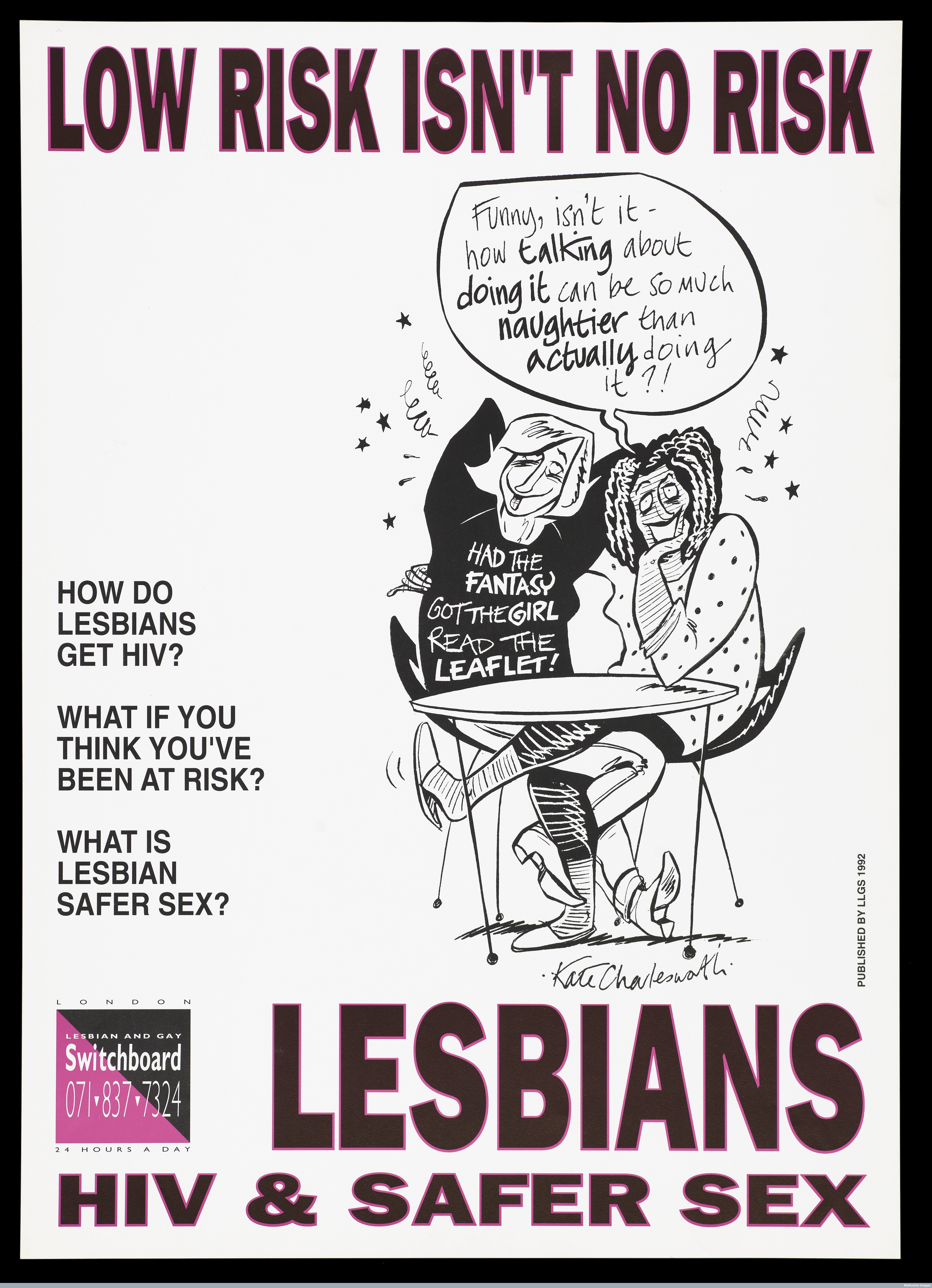
A poster aimed at lesbians says "Low risk isn't no risk". It uses the expression "safer sex".

A year later, the same term appeared in an article in The New York Times. This article emphasized that most specialists advised their AIDS patients to practice safe sex. The concept included limiting the number of sexual partners, using prophylactics, avoiding bodily fluid exchange, and resisting the use of drugs that reduced inhibitions for high-risk sexual behavior. Moreover, in 1985, the first safe sex guidelines were established by the 'Coalition for Sexual Responsibilities'. According to these guidelines, safe sex was practiced by using condoms also when engaging in anal or oral sex.

Although the term safe sex was primarily used in reference to sexual activity between men, in 1986 the concept was spread to the general population. Various programs were developed to promote safe sex practices among college students. These programs were focused on promoting the use of the condom, a better knowledge about the partner's sexual history, and limiting the number of sexual partners. The first book on this subject, Safe Sex in the Age of AIDS, appeared in the same year. It had 88 pages that described both positive and negative approaches to sexual life. Sexual behavior was loosely sorted into safe (kissing, hugging, massage, body-to-body rubbing, mutual masturbation, exhibitionism, phone sex, and use of separate sex toys); possibly safe (use of condoms); or unsafe.

In 1997, specialists in this matter promoted the use of condoms as the most accessible safe sex method (besides abstinence), and they called for TV commercials featuring condoms. During the same year, the Catholic Church in the United States issued its own safer sex guidelines on which condoms were listed. Two years later, the Vatican urged chastity and heterosexual marriage, attacking the American Catholic bishops' guidelines.

A 2006 survey found that the most common definitions of safe sex are condom use (68% of the interviewed subjects), abstinence (31.1% of the interviewed subjects), monogamy (28.4% of the interviewed subjects), and safe partner (18.7% of the interviewed subjects).

The term safer sex in Canada and the United States has gained greater use by health workers, reflecting that risk of transmission of sexually transmitted infections in various sexual activities is a continuum. Safer sex is thought to make it more obvious to individuals that any sexual activity carries a certain degree of risk. The term safe sex is still in common use in the United Kingdom, Australia and New Zealand.

The term safe love has also been used, notably by the French Sidaction in the promotion of men's underpants incorporating a condom pocket and including the red ribbon symbol in the design, which were sold to support the charity.

== Practices ==
Sexual Health Educators and Public Health Agencies recommend a range of safe-sex practices. Many of these practices can reduce (but not eliminate) risk of transmitting or acquiring STIs.

=== Phone sex/cybersex/sexting ===
Sexual activities, such as phone sex, cybersex, and sexting, that do not include direct contact with the skin or bodily fluids of sexual partners, carry no STI risks and, thus, are forms of safe sex.

=== Non-penetrative sex ===
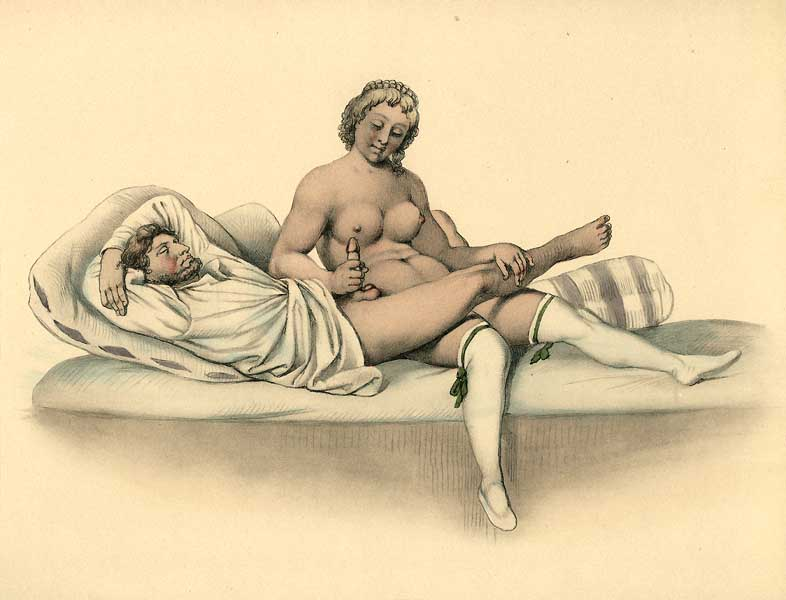
Watercolor of manual stimulation of the penis, Johann Nepomuk Geiger, 1840

A range of sex acts called non-penetrative sex or outercourse can significantly reduce STI risks. Non-penetrative sex includes practices such as kissing, mutual masturbation, circle jerks, manual sex, rubbing, or stroking. According to the Health Department of Western Australia, this sexual practice may prevent pregnancy and most STIs. However, non-penetrative sex may not protect against infections that can be transmitted via skin-to-skin contact, such as herpes and human papilloma virus. Mutual masturbation and manual sex carry some STI risk, especially if there is skin contact or shared bodily fluids with sexual partners; the risks are significantly lower than other sexual activities.

=== Condoms, dental dams, gloves ===
Barriers, such as condoms, dental dams, and medical gloves can prevent contact with body fluids (such as blood, vaginal fluid, semen, rectal mucus), and other means of transmitting STIs (like skin, hair and shared objects) during sexual activity.

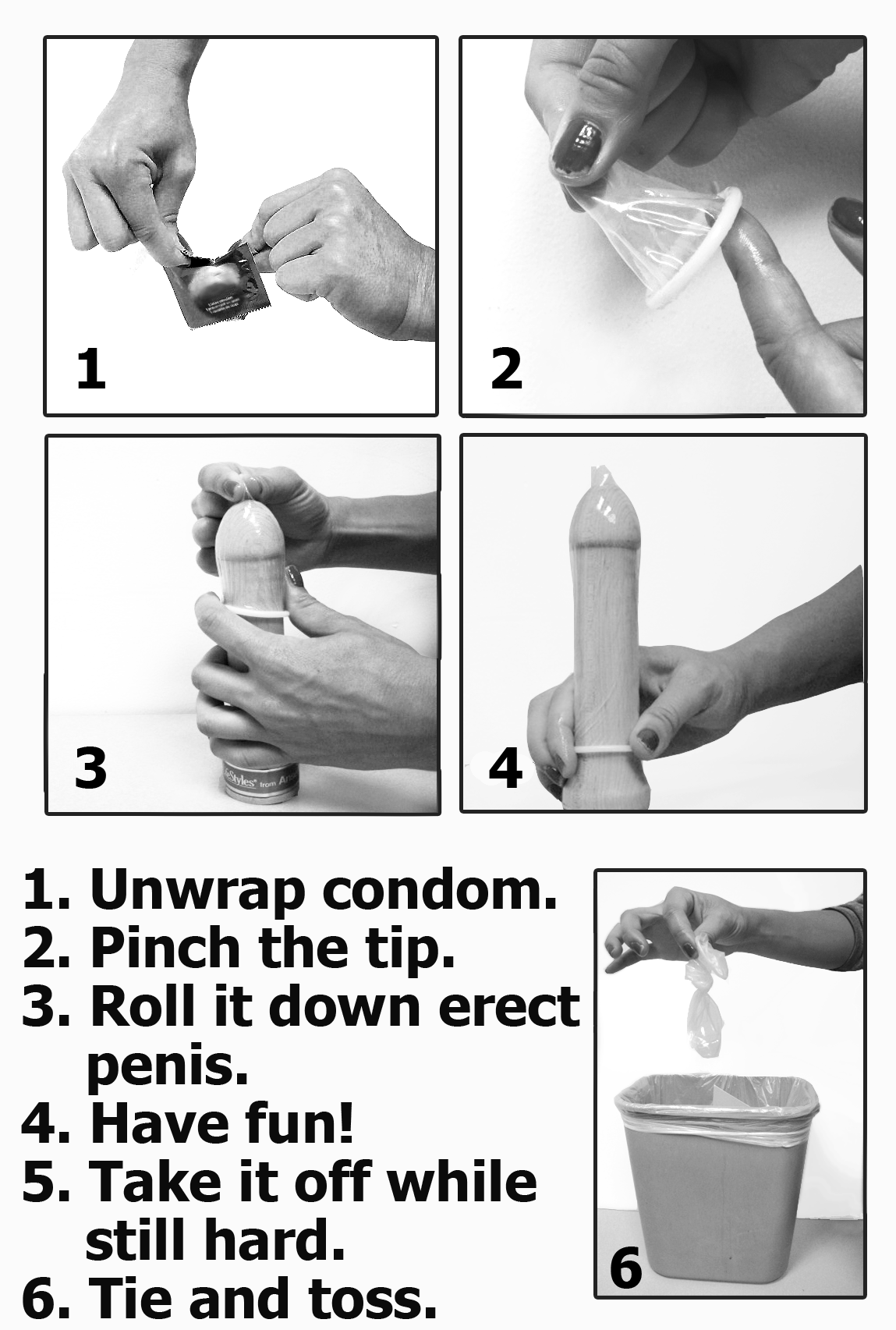
How to put a male condom on a penis

- External condoms can be used to cover the penis, hands, fingers, or other body parts during sexual penetration or oral sex. They are most frequently made of latex, and can also be made out of synthetic materials including polyurethane and polyisoprene.
- Internal condoms (also called female condoms) are inserted into the vagina or anus prior to sexual penetration. These condoms are made of either latex, polyurethane, or nitrile. External and internal condoms should not be used at the same time; they may break due to friction between the materials during sexual activity.
- A dental dam (originally used in dentistry) is a sheet of latex typically used for protection between the mouth and the vulva or anus when engaging in oral sex. Condoms or disposable gloves may be cut to act as a dental dam. Insufficient research has been conducted regarding whether plastic wrap can effectively serve as a dental dam. Authorities on sexual health cautiously recommend it due to its greater accessibility compared to dental dams.
- Medical gloves and finger cots made out of latex, vinyl, nitrile, or polyurethane can cover hands or fingers during manual sex or may be used as a makeshift dental dam during oral sex.
- Condoms, dental dams, and gloves can also be used to cover sex toys such as dildos during sexual stimulation or penetration. If a sex toy is to be used in more than one orifice or partner, a condom/dental dam/glove can be used over it and changed when the toy is moved.

Oil-based lubrication can break down the structure of latex condoms, dental dams or gloves, reducing their effectiveness for STI protection. Personal lubricants can also be water-based or silicone-based.

While the use of external condoms can reduce STI risks during sexual activity, they are not 100% effective. One study has suggested condoms might reduce HIV transmission by 85% to 95%; effectiveness beyond 95% was deemed unlikely because of slippage, breakage, and incorrect use. It also said, "In practice, inconsistent use may reduce the overall effectiveness of condoms to as low as 60–70%".^{p. 40.}

=== Pre-exposure prophylaxis (PrEP) ===
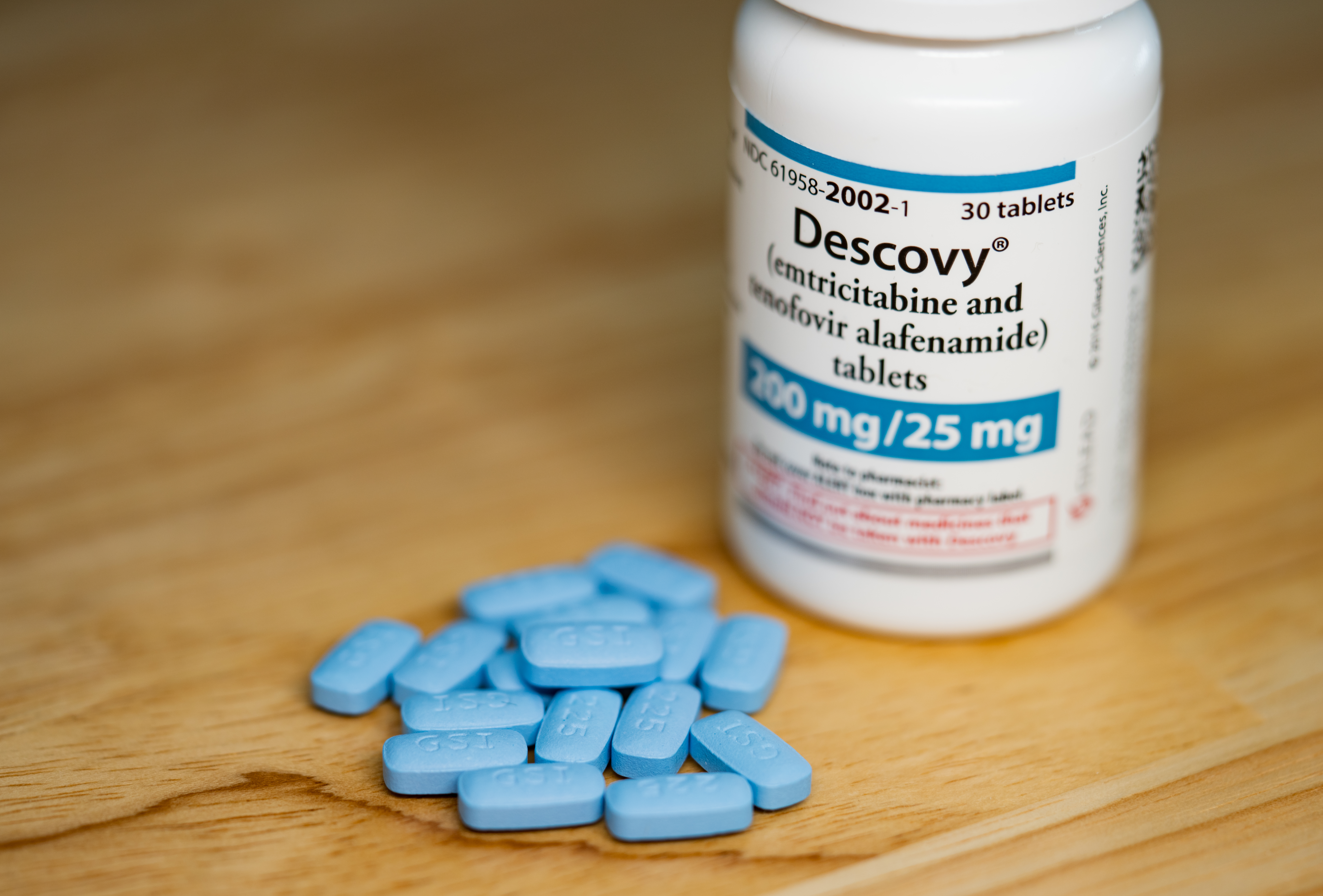
A bottle of PrEP pills

Pre-exposure prophylaxis (often abbreviated as PrEP) is the use of prescription drugs by those who do not have HIV to prevent HIV infection. PrEP drugs are taken prior to HIV exposure to prevent the transmission of the virus, usually between sexual partners. PrEP drugs do not prevent other STI infections or pregnancy.

As of 2018, the most widely approved form of PrEP combines two drugs (tenofovir and emtricitabine) in one pill. That drug combination is sold under the brand name Truvada by Gilead Sciences. It is also sold in generic formulations worldwide. Other drugs and modalities are being studied for use as PrEP.

Different countries have approved different protocols for using the tenofovir/emtricitabine-combination drug as PrEP. That two-drug combination has been shown to prevent HIV infection in different populations when taken daily, intermittently, and on demand. Numerous studies have found the tenofovir/emtricitabine combination to be over 90% effective at preventing HIV transmission between sexual partners. AVAC has developed a tool to track trends in PrEP uptake across the globe. In 2025, approval was announced for lencapavir, a PrEP shot that is effective for 6 months at a time, increasing the likelihood of adequate suppression.

=== Treatment as prevention ===
Treatment as Prevention (often abbreviated as TasP) is the practice of testing for and treating HIV infection as a way to prevent further spread of the virus. Those who know their HIV-positive status can use safe-sex practices to protect themselves and their partners (such as using condoms, sero-sorting partners, or choosing less-risky sexual activities). And, because HIV-positive people with durably suppressed or undetectable amounts of HIV in their blood cannot transmit HIV to sexual partners, sexual activity with HIV-positive partners on effective treatment is a form of safe sex (to prevent HIV infection). This fact has given rise to the concept of "U=U" ("Undetectable = Untransmittable").

=== Other forms of safe sex ===
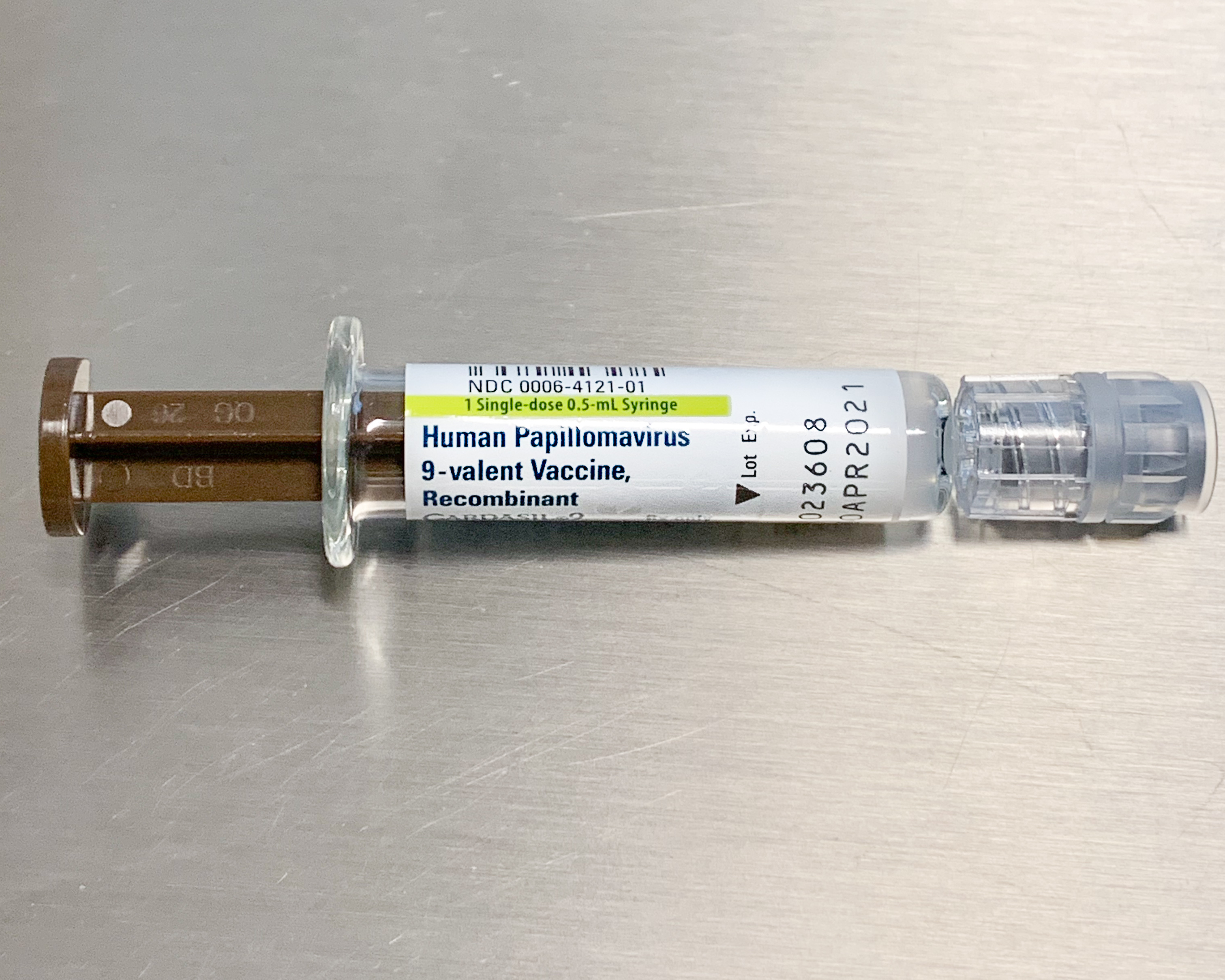
A syringe pre-filled with a vaccine that confers immunity against 9 types of HPV that are likely to cause genital warts and potentially cancer

Other methods proven effective at reducing STI risks during sexual activity are:

- Immunization against certain sexually transmitted viruses. The most common vaccines protect against hepatitis B and human papilloma virus (HPV), which can cause cervical cancer, penile cancer, oral cancer, and genital warts. Immunization before initiation of sexual activity increases the effectiveness of these vaccines. HPV vaccines are recommended for all teen girls and women, as well as teen boys and men, through age 26 and 21, respectively.
- Limiting the number of sexual partners, particularly casual sexual partners, or restricting sexual activity to those who know and share their STI status, can also reduce STI risks. Monamory and Polyamory are safe when all partners are non-infected. However, some monamorous people have been infected with sexually transmitted infections by partners who engage in infidelity or use injection drugs. The same risks apply to polyamorous people, who may face higher risks depending on how many people are in the polyamorous group.
- Communication with sexual partners about sexual history and STI status, preferred safe sex practices, and acceptable risks for partnered sexual activities.
- Engaging in less-risky sexual activities. In general, solo sexual activities are less risky than partnered activities. Sexual penetration of orifices (mouth, vagina, anus) and sharing body fluids (such as semen, blood, vaginal fluids, and rectal mucus) between sexual partners carry a higher risk for STIs.
- Regular STI testing and treatment, especially for those who are sexually active with more than one casual sexual partner. It is possible to attain and show proof of STI status from lab results. Some online dating apps and websites allow this information to be shared.
- Intentionally seeking partners that have matching STIs. This is especially common for HSV and HIV, because it is impossible or exceptionally difficult to cure them. Two partners who both have oral herpes have no risk of giving each-other oral herpes, although they could potentially spread the disease to new areas on their partners bodies. Especially in regions where more than one HIV subtype is endemic, it is possible to become infected with more than one type of HIV. Medication can prevent both transmitting and receiving additional subtypes.
- STI-suppressing medication like Acyclovir for herpes and ART for HIV can make it significantly safer for a partner with these STIs to have sex with someone who does not have them. Herpes-suppressing medication is usually touted as being able to reduce the duration of highly-contagious outbreaks, but proper adherence to HIV-suppressing medication can make someone completely unable to spread the virus. Medication adherence has been made easier with longer-lasting forms of the medicines, including lencapavir which lasts 6 months, instead of daily pills.

== Ineffective methods ==
Most methods of contraception are not effective at preventing the spread of STIs. This includes birth control pills, vasectomy, tubal ligation, periodic abstinence, IUDs and multiple non-barrier methods of pregnancy prevention. However, condoms, when used correctly, significantly reduce the risks of STI transmission and unwanted pregnancy.

The spermicide nonoxynol-9 has been claimed to reduce the likelihood of STI transmission. However, a technical report from 2001 by the World Health Organization has shown that nonoxynol-9 is an irritant and can produce tiny tears in mucous membranes, which may increase the risk of transmission by offering pathogens more easy points of entry into the system. They reported that nonoxynol-9 lubricant does not have enough spermicide to increase contraceptive effectiveness, and cautioned that they should not be promoted. There is no evidence that spermicidal condoms are better at preventing STI transmission compared to condoms that do not have spermicide. If used properly, spermicidal condoms can prevent pregnancy, but there is still an increased risk that nonoxynyl-9 can irritate the skin, making it more susceptible to infections.

The use of a diaphragm or contraceptive sponge provides some women with better protection against certain sexually transmitted infections, but they are not effective for all STIs.

Hormonal methods of preventing pregnancy (such as oral contraceptives [i.e., 'The pill'], depoprogesterone, hormonal Intrauterine devices, the vaginal ring, and the patch) offer no protection against STIs. The copper IUD and the hormonal IUD provide up to 99% protection against pregnancy, but no protection against STIs. Women with a copper intrauterine device may be subject to greater risk of infection from bacterial infections such as gonorrhea or chlamydia, although this is debated.

Coitus interruptus (or "pulling out"), in which the penis is removed from the vagina or mouth before ejaculation, may reduce transmission of STIs or rates of pregnancy but still carries significant risk. This is because pre-ejaculate, a fluid that oozes from the penile urethra before ejaculation, may contain STI pathogens. Additionally, the microbes responsible for some diseases, including genital warts and syphilis, can be transmitted through skin-to-skin or mucous membrane contact.

== Anal sex ==
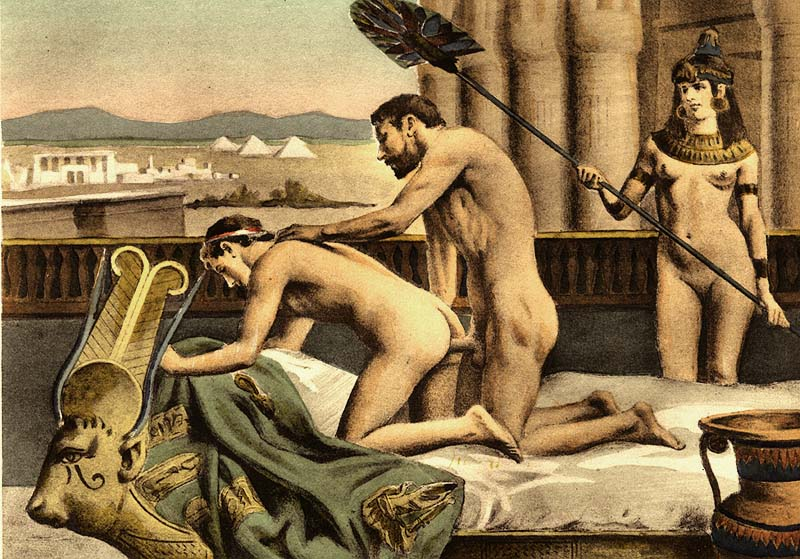
An illustration showing Hadrian and Antinous engaging in anal sex based on ancient descriptions from De Figuris Veneris

Unprotected anal penetration is considered a high-risk sexual activity because the thin tissues of the anus and rectum can be easily damaged. Slight injuries can allow the passage of bacteria and viruses, including HIV. This includes penetration of the anus by fingers, hands, or sex toys such as dildos. Condoms may be more likely to break during anal sex than during vaginal sex, increasing the risk of STI transmission.

The main risk that individuals are exposed to when performing anal sex is the transmission of HIV. Other possible infections include hepatitis A, B and C; intestinal parasite infections like Giardia; and bacterial infections such as Escherichia coli.

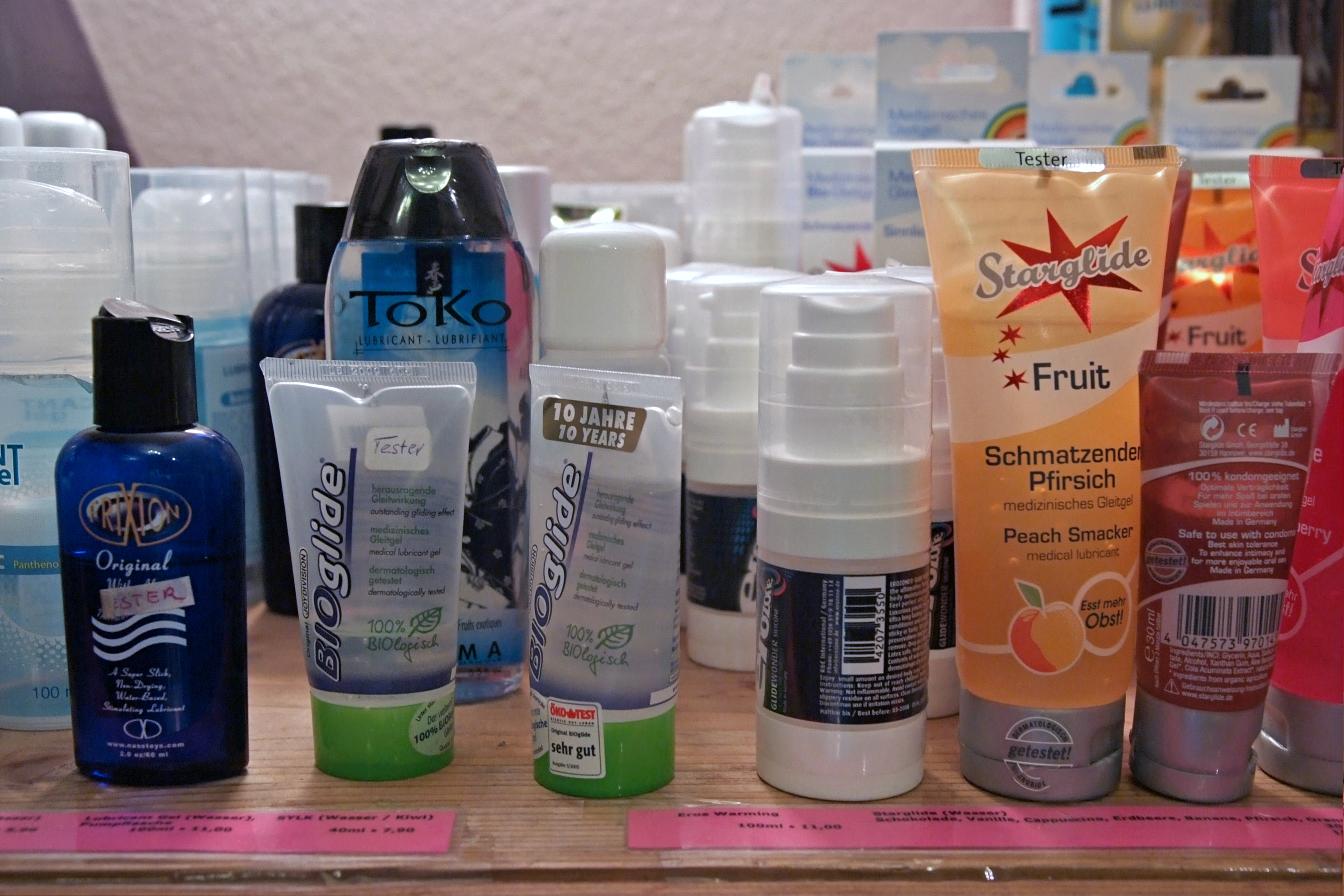
A variety of personal lubricants

It is recommended that anal sex be avoided by couples in which one of the partners has been diagnosed with an STI until the treatment has proven to be effective.

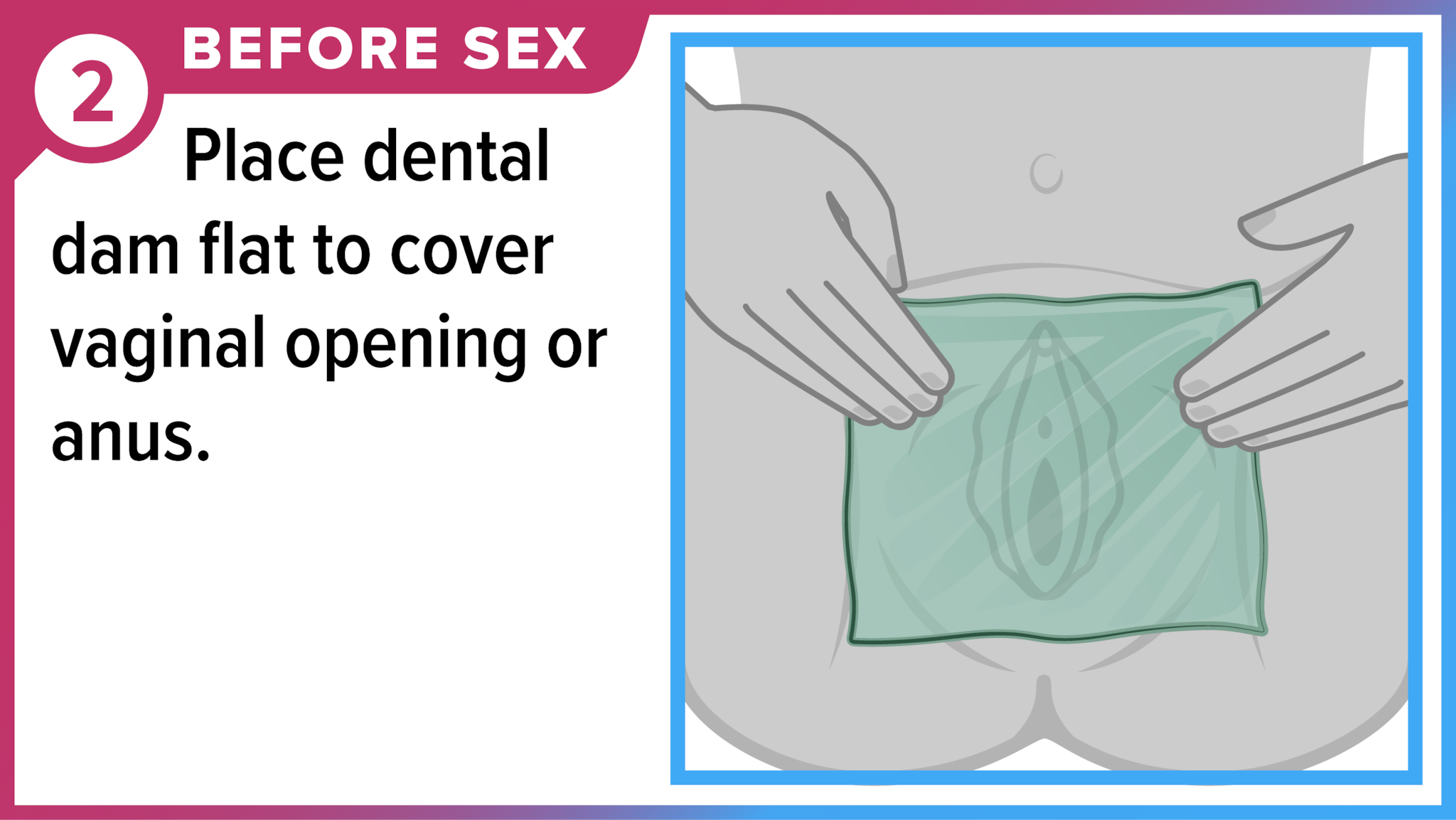
Part of a guide illustrating how cunnilingus or anilingus can be made safer with a dental dam.

To make anal sex safer, the couple can ensure that the anal area is clean and the bowel is empty, and the partner on whom anal penetration occurs should be able to relax. Regardless of whether anal penetration occurs by using a finger or the penis, the condom is the best barrier method to prevent transmission of STIs. Enemas can increase the risk of HIV infection and lymphogranuloma venereum proctitis.

Since the rectum can be easily damaged, the use of lubricants is highly recommended even when penetration occurs by using the finger. Especially for beginners, using a condom on the finger is both a protection measure against STIs and a source of lubricant. Most condoms are lubricated, and they allow less painful and easier penetration. Oil-based lubricants can damage latex condoms, causing them to fail; water-based and silicone-based lubricants are available instead. Non-latex condoms are available for people who are allergic to latex made out of polyurethane or polyisoprene. Polyurethane condoms can safely be used with oil-based lubricant. The internal condom may also be used effectively by the anal receiving partner.

Anal stimulation with a sex toy can be done with similar safety measures to anal penetration with a penis by using a condom on the sex toy if possible. Certain sex toys are easier to clean to a level of safety, and others are incapable of being cleaned thoroughly. In the 21st century, developments in sex technology have increased the availability of consumer devices intended for intimate use. Some manufacturers, such as Lovense, produce silicone-based products designed for compatibility with common safer-sex materials. Silicone toys are incompatible with silicone-based lubricants.

Public-health guidance recommends using water- or silicone-based lubricants with latex and similar barriers, as oil-based lubricants can weaken these materials and increase the risk of condom failure.

Sexual partners must wash and clean their penis after anal intercourse if they intend to penetrate the vagina. Bacteria from the rectum are easily transferred to the vagina, which may cause vaginal and urinary tract infections.

When anal–oral contact occurs, protection is recommended since this is a risky sexual behavior in which illnesses such as hepatitis A or STIs can be easily transmitted, as well as enteric infections. The dental dam or non-vented plastic wrap are effective protection means whenever anilingus is performed.

== Sex toys ==
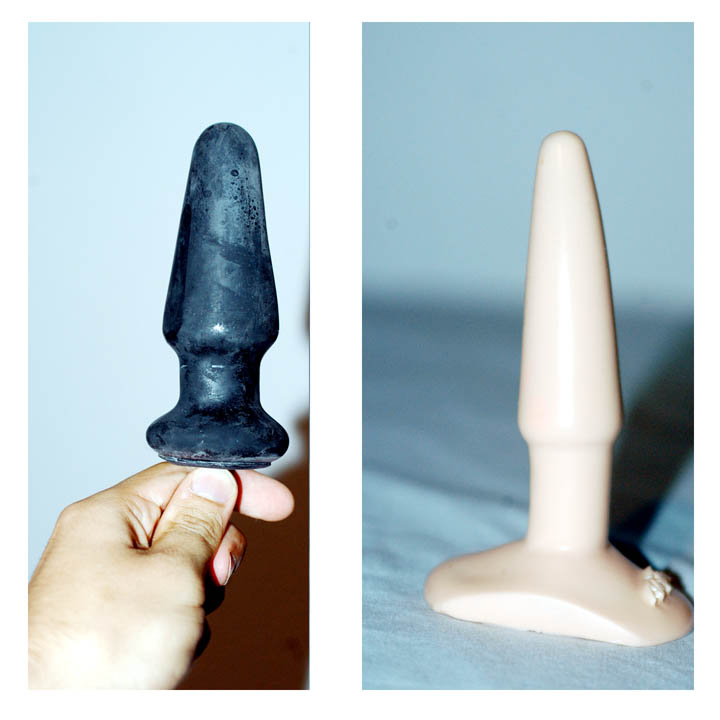
Two sex toys intended for anal use (note the flared bases)

Putting a condom on a sex toy provides better sexual hygiene and can help to prevent transmission of infections if the sex toy is shared, provided the condom is replaced when used by a different partner. Some sex toys are made of porous materials, and pores retain viruses and bacteria, which makes it necessary to clean sex toys thoroughly, preferably with the use of cleaners specifically for sex toys. Glass is non-porous, and medical-grade glass sex toys are more easily sterilized between uses.

All sex toys should be properly cleaned after use. The way in which a sex toy is cleaned varies depending on the type of material it is made of. Some sex toys can be boiled or cleaned in a dishwasher. Most sex toys come with advice on the best way to clean and store them, and these instructions should be carefully followed. A sex toy should be cleaned not only when it is shared with other individuals but also when it is used on different parts of the body (such as the mouth, vagina, or anus). In cases in which one of the partners is treated for an STI, it is recommended that the couple not share sex toys until the treatment has proven to be effective.

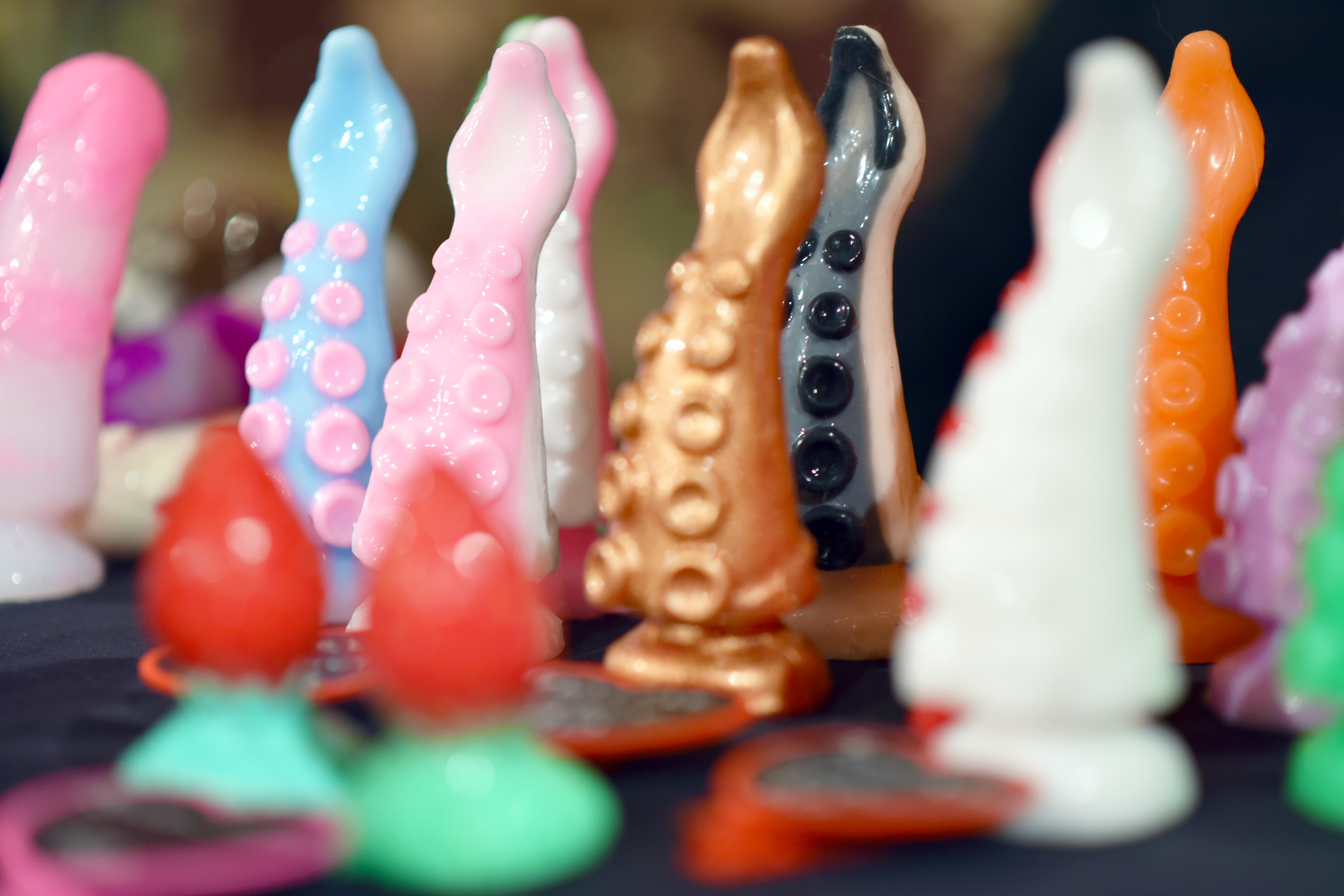
Tentacle sex toys made out of platinum grade silicone for safety and durability

Toys should be made of body-safe materials. Only materials that can be safely placed in the mouth and safely placed on the skin are safe to use. Many toys are made of toxic materials and are impossible to clean properly. These cheap and poisonous materials often degrade quickly over time. Some soft toys are made of medical grade silicone, which is properly non-porous and non-reactive with the body. Toys from unreliable sellers may be mislabeled. Other commonly recognized as safe materials include glass and titanium. If the material has additives such as pigments or softeners, those may also be toxic. A sex toy should regularly be checked for scratches or breaks that can be breeding grounds for bacteria. It is best if the damaged sex toy is replaced by a new, undamaged one. Even more hygiene protection should be considered by pregnant women when using sex toys. Sharing any sex toy that may draw blood, like whips or needles, is not recommended as it can spread serious blood-borne infections. Pathogens have different lifespans outside of the body and different resilience to disinfecting chemicals. HIV-containing fluids usually become unable to infect anyone within hours and HPV remains infectious on surfaces possibly for a week or longer. This means toys become safer simply by letting them rest sufficiently between partners, with hot and dry conditions accelerating this process.

== Abstinence ==
Sexual abstinence reduces STIs and pregnancy risks associated with sexual contact, but STIs may also be transmitted through non-sexual means, or by rape. HIV may be transmitted through contaminated needles used in tattooing, body piercing, or injections. Medical or dental procedures using contaminated instruments can also spread HIV, while some health-care workers have acquired HIV through occupational exposure to accidental injuries with needles. Evidence does not support the use of abstinence-only sex education. Abstinence-only sex education programs have been found to be ineffective in decreasing rates of HIV infection in the developed world and unplanned pregnancy. Abstinence-only sex education primarily relies on the consequences of character and morality while health care professionals are concerned about matters regarding health outcomes and behaviors.

== See also ==
- Bareback (sex)
- Celibacy
- Human sexual activity
- Julio and Marisol
- Masturbation
- Misconceptions about HIV/AIDS
- Party and play
- Post-exposure prophylaxis
- Sisters of Perpetual Indulgence
- Terrence Higgins Trust
