= Richard Berkowitz =

American AIDS activist and writer

- Born: October 6, 1955 (age 71); United States
- Occupations: Author and AIDS activist

Richard Berkowitz (born October 6, 1955) is a gay American author and activist best known as an early advocate of safe sex in response to the AIDS crisis among gay men in the 1980s. The award-winning 2008 documentary Sex Positive directed by Daryl Wein is about his life and activities.

== Life and career ==
Berkowitz was born to Jewish parents and raised in New Jersey, where he attended Rutgers University in the mid-1970s. While in college, he helped to organize what he believes was the first gay rights protest in the state, demonstrating against an anti-gay effigy hung by the Delta Kappa Epsilon fraternity. After college, Berkowitz moved to New York City in 1978 or 1979, earning a living as a self-described S&M hustler.

Even before AIDS was recognized as a syndrome, Berkowitz became concerned about protecting his clients, many of whom were married, from sexually transmitted diseases. He met physician Joseph Sonnabend and became a patient, learning from Sonnabend the practices for risk reduction that would later become known as safe sex. His early work with Sonnabend and singer and activist Michael Callen noted behaviors including drug use, multiple sexual partners, and unsafe sexual practices in the gay community for transmission. These claims were considered controversial by early leaders of Gay Men's Health Crisis and many activists took issue with the language of their message and its implications. The 1983 pamphlet How to Have Sex in an Epidemic: One Approach by Callen and Berkowitz (in consultation with Sonnabend) is widely considered the first sex-positive guide to practicing safe sex. Berkowitz tested positive for HIV in 1984 but was able to avoid taking any anti-viral drugs until 1995.

== In the media ==
- Berkowitz is the subject of the 2008 documentary Sex Positive directed by Daryl Wein and winner of the 2008 Outfest Grand Jury Prize for Best Documentary. The film was released on DVD in June 2010.
- Berkowitz is featured in the second episode of the fifth season of the podcast Fiasco, hosted by Leon Neyfakh.

== Selected publications ==
- Richard Berkowitz and Michael Callen, with Joseph Sonnabend (1983). How to Have Sex in an Epidemic: One Approach. News From The Front Publications
- Berkowitz, Richard (2003). Stayin' Alive: The Invention of Safe Sex. Basic Books. ISBN 978-0-8133-4092-0.
