= Jeffrey Escoffier =

American writer (1942–2022)

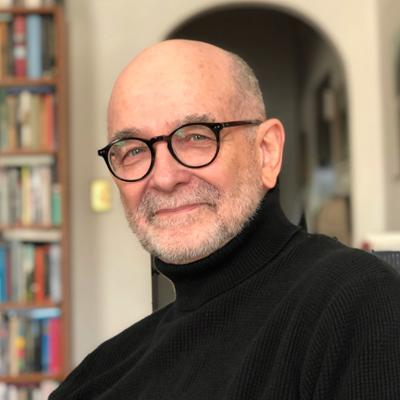
- Born: October 9, 1942; Baltimore, Maryland, U.S.
- Died: May 20, 2022 (aged 79); New York City, U.S.
- Education: St. John's College (Annapolis); Columbia University; University of Pennsylvania

Jeffrey Paul Escoffier (October 9, 1942 – May 20, 2022) was an American author, activist, and media strategist. He was a research associate at the Brooklyn Institute for Social Research. He has taught at the University of California, Berkeley and Davis; Barnard College; The New School; and Rutgers University–Newark. He lived and worked in Brooklyn, New York.

Escoffier earned his undergraduate degree at St. John's College, Annapolis, before doing his graduate work at Columbia University and the University of Pennsylvania. He was the director of health media and marketing for the New York City Department of Health and Mental Hygiene from 1999 to 2015. Escoffier was an active participant in the LGBT community in Philadelphia, San Francisco, and New York City.

== Life and career ==
Jeffrey Paul Escoffier was born to Iris (Miller) and George Wendel and on October 9, 1942, in Baltimore, Maryland, and raised in Manhattan and Staten Island. His mother was the owner of an antique shop and his father worked in the United States Army. Escoffier obtained a bachelor's degree from St. John's College and earned a master's degree in international relations from Columbia University. In 1970 he moved to Philadelphia, where he pursued his doctoral studies in economic history at the University of Pennsylvania. In 1972 he co-founded and served on the editorial board of The Gay Alternative (1972–1976), a gay and lesbian cultural magazine. In 1977 he moved to San Francisco, where he co-founded the San Francisco Lesbian and Gay History Project in 1985. In 1978 he joined the editorial board of Socialist Review, a democratic socialistic journal, and served as its executive editor from 1980 to 1988.

In 1988 Escoffier co-founded OUT/LOOK: A National Lesbian and Gay Quarterly, one of the first joint lesbian and gay cultural ventures. Starting in 1990, OUT/LOOK sponsored, under Escoffier's leadership, a series of conferences called OutWrite that brought together over 1,200 LGBT writers from across the U.S. These conferences brought together several notable writers such as Judy Grahn, Allen Ginsberg, Edward Albee, and Essex Hemphill. In the wake of the OutWrite conferences, he worked as a literary agent for lesbian and gay authors across the Bay Area.

Escoffier served on the board of the Center for Lesbian and Gay Studies (CLAGS) at the City University of New York from 1992 to 1995 and then from 2010 to 2013. He was the coordinator of the CLAGS project on "Families, Values, and Public School Curriculum".

In 1995 he joined the NYC Department of Health and Mental Hygiene as the deputy director of the Office of Gay and Lesbian Health. In 2000 he became the director of Health Media and Marketing and held that position until his retirement in 2015. There he supervised the department's media and public education campaigns on several topics, including smoking cessation, HIV prevention and testing, anti-obesity, swine influenza, and immunization.

Escoffier died in Brooklyn on May 20, 2022, aged 79, from complications of a fall.

== Works ==
- John Maynard Keynes (New York: Chelsea House, 1995)
- American Homo: Community and Perversity (University of California Press, 1998)
- Mark Morris' L'Allegro, il Penseroso ed il Moderato (editor, with Matthew Lore) (New York: Marlowe, 2001)
- Sexual Revolution (editor) (New York: Thunder's Mouth, 2003)
- Bigger Than Life: The History of Gay Porn Cinema from Beefcake to Hardcore (Philadelphia: Running Press, 2009)
- Sex, Society, and the Making of Pornography: The Pornographic Object of Knowledge (Rutgers University Press, 2021)
- A Pill for Promiscuity: Gay Sex in an Age of Pharmaceuticals (editor, with Andrew R. Spieldenner) (Rutgers University Press, 2023)
