= People With AIDS =

Term

People With AIDS (PWA) or People With HIV (PWH), referring to HIV/AIDS positive people, is a term of self-empowerment adopted by people with human immunodeficiency virus (HIV/AIDS) in the early years of the HIV/AIDS pandemic as an alternative to the passive "AIDS patient". The phrase arose largely from the ACT UP activist community, however use of the term may or may not indicate association with a particular political group.

Among the early documented uses of the term was by San Francisco nurse Bobbi Campbell, a member of the Sisters of Perpetual Indulgence and later People With AIDS' San Francisco chapter. This group was part of the formation which would be known as the Denver Principles out of the Second National AIDS Forum, which was held in Denver, United States.

The predominant attitude is that one should not assume that one's life is over or will end soon solely because they have been diagnosed with HIV/AIDS. Although most of the earliest organizers have died, and organizations have dissolved or reconfigured into AIDS service organizations (ASOs), the self-empowerment and self-determination aspects of the movement continues. The New York Public Library holds the archives of the New York City chapter of the organization, as well as ACT UP New York's work in the field.

== The Denver Principles Project ==
In 2009, the National Association of People with AIDS (NAPWA) and POZ magazine announced a new initiative called The Denver Principles Project. The Denver Principles Project aimed to recommit the HIV community to the Denver Principles and dramatically increase NAPWA's membership. With a vastly increased membership, NAPWA will be better able to advocate for effective HIV prevention and care, as well as to combat the stigma that surrounds HIV and impedes education, prevention and treatment of HIV.

== See also ==
- Think Positive – organization in Lebanon
