= Gubelmann =

Gubelmann is a surname. Notable people with the surname include:

- Fiona Gubelmann (born 1980), American actress
- Marjorie Gubelmann (born 1969), CEO of Vie Luxe International
- William S. Gubelmann (1863–1959), American inventor

== See also ==
- Gabelmann
