= Joel Weisman =

American physician (1943-2009)

- Born: February 20, 1943
- Died: July 18, 2009 (aged 66)
- Education: Doctor of Osteopathic Medicine
- Alma mater: Kansas City University of Medicine and Biosciences
- Occupation: Osteopathic Physician

Joel D. Weisman D.O. (February 20, 1943 – July 18, 2009) was one of the first to identify a pattern of illnesses that was ultimately diagnosed as AIDS during his work as a general practitioner in the United States. He later became an advocate for the development of treatments and prevention of the disease.

== Early life and education ==
Weisman was born in Newark, New Jersey, on February 20, 1943. He attended the Kansas City College of Osteopathy (later known as the Kansas City University of Medicine and Biosciences, graduating in 1970 with a Doctor of Osteopathic Medicine (DO). He practiced medicine in his hometown of Carteret, New Jersey, for several years and ended his brief marriage by disclosing that he was gay.

== Discovery and treatment of AIDS ==
He moved to Los Angeles and was hired by a doctor's office in North Hollywood, where he started to see a number of patients in 1978 who had a series of unusual conditions, including younger men with shingles, a case of Kaposi's sarcoma, and several patients who had symptoms of what appeared to be, but was not, lymphoma. In 1980, a series of patients came to a medical office he had opened in Sherman Oaks, all gay men who had a pattern of what appeared to be immune system disorders exhibited by significant loss of weight and swollen lymph nodes, accompanied by fever and rashes, in addition to two patients with chronic diarrhea, depressed white blood cell counts and fungal infections.

Weisman referred two of these cases in 1981 to Michael S. Gottlieb, an immunologist at the UCLA Medical Center, who had a patient of his own with a similar pattern of symptoms. Weisman recollected that he knew going into this meeting that these cases "represented was the tip of the iceberg" and that there were "a lot of people that were potentially right behind them". Gottlieb diagnosed these and a number of his other patients as having pneumocystis pneumonia. A report they jointly wrote published by the Centers for Disease Control in the June 5, 1981, issue of its Morbidity and Mortality Weekly Report, describing how their patients, "5 young men, all active homosexuals, were treated for biopsy-confirmed Pneumocystis carinii pneumonia at 3 different hospitals in Los Angeles, California" of which "[t]wo of the patients died" by the time of the original report. This notice has been recognized as the first published report marking "the official start" of the AIDS pandemic and as "the first report on AIDS in the medical literature". A more detailed report regarding the pneumocystis pneumonia found in a series of four patients was published in a December 1981 issue of the New England Journal of Medicine.

Weisman immediately started warning his patients that the disease was sexually transmitted and that behavioral changes were needed to help prevent its spread, a warning that was often disregarded. Many of his friends died. He became involved in efforts to provide treatment options for AIDS patients, establishing AIDS Project Los Angeles in 1983 and developing Southern California's first AIDS unit at the Sherman Oaks Hospital. When amfAR was founded in 1985 by Gottlieb and Mathilde Krim, Weisman was a board member and became chairman from 1988 to 1992. His medical practice grew into the Pacific Oaks Medical Group, one of the largest treating patients with HIV / AIDS.

In Weisman's obituary in the Los Angeles Times, Gottlieb described him as "a very astute physician" who recognized "that something out of the ordinary was happening" by being "alert to unusual symptoms in his patients". Krim described how Weisman immediately knew that "he was observing something that was never seen before."

== Personal ==
Timothy Bogue, his partner of 10 years, died of AIDS in 1991.

Weisman died at age 66 due to heart disease on July 18, 2009, at his home in the Westwood neighborhood of Los Angeles. He was survived by his domestic partner of 17 years, Bill Hutton, as well as by a daughter and granddaughter, a brother and two nieces.
