= Marjorie Gubelmann =

American DJ and socialite

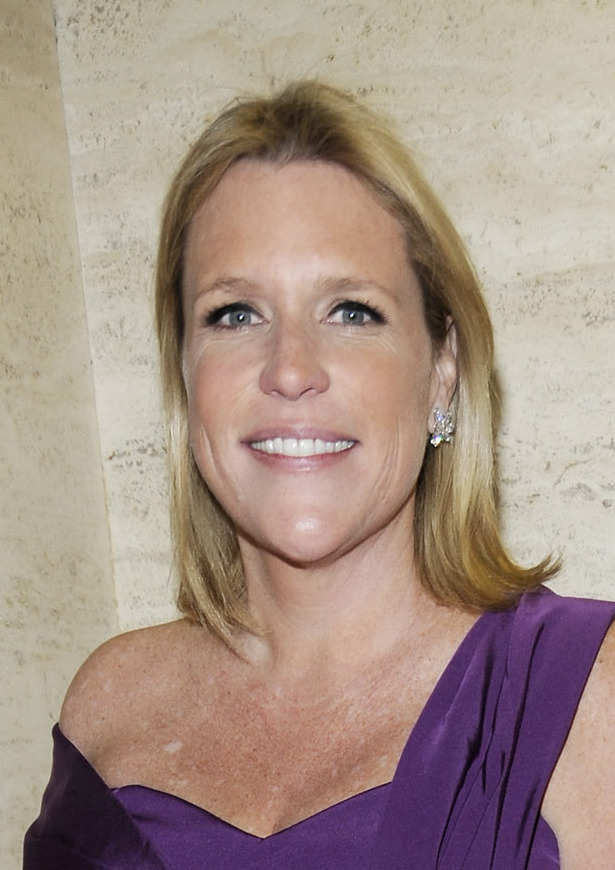
- Gubelmann in 2009
- Born: April 11, 1969 (age 57); New York City
- Other name: DJ MadMarj
- Education: New England College
- Occupation: DJ
- Parent(s): Susan McCammon Gubelmann and William S. Gubelmann
- Relatives: Inventor William S. Gubelmann (great-grandfather), Car racer Walter Gubelmann (grandfather), Wyeth S. Gubelmann (brother)
- Website: madmarj.com

Marjorie Gubelmann is an American DJ, socialite and philanthropist who performs under the stage name DJ MadMarj. She has appeared at fashion, media and philanthropic events in the United States and Europe and has been active in New York society and charity events.

== Early life and education ==
Gubelmann was born in New York City, to Susan McCammon Gubelmann and William S. Gubelmann, and has one younger brother, Wyeth S. Gubelmann. Gubelmann’s great-grandfather was the inventor William S. Gubelmann, who held more than 5000 claims on patents, and was called “the father of all calculating machines in use today” by Popular Mechanics.

In 1964 her grandfather Walter Gubelmann headed up the racing syndicate that successfully defended the America's Cup with the yacht Constellation.

Gubelmann attended New England College.

== Career ==
=== Business ===
Gubelmann's first job was at Licensing Management International, a London-based licensing firm. In 1995 she moved to New York City and worked for AmfAR in their Special Events/Major Gifts department.

In 2004 Gubelmann started Vie Luxe International, a New York City–based company that produced scented candles. The firm manufactured candle lines for designers including Carolina Herrera, Calvin Klein and Oscar de la Renta, among others.

Her work in licensing and branding connected her with New York’s fashion and luxury retail industries.

=== DJ career ===
Dubbed "The DJ With A Diamond Touch" by W.

Gubelmann performs as a television, event and club DJ under the name DJ MadMarj.

Gubelmann first began DJing as a college radio disc jockey while attending New England College, where she used the nickname “Mad Marj.” She later revived the persona professionally after training at the Scratch DJ Academy in New York.

Gubelmann began DJing professionally in her early forties and developed a career performing at fashion, cultural and private events internationally.

As DJ MadMarj, Gubelmann has opened for the band Duran Duran at Madison Square Garden, performed at the Sydney Opera House, and shared the stage with artists including Lil Jon, Cardi B and Mary J. Blige. She has also DJed events for fashion houses including Dolce & Gabbana and Bulgari.

During the COVID-19 pandemic she hosted livestream dance parties on Twitch, drawing audiences from New York’s fashion and nightlife community.

She has performed at high-profile private events including the wedding celebration of Infanta Maria Francisca, Duchess of Coimbra, in Portugal, and at the New York wedding of music producer Doug Davis, where she performed alongside rapper Lil Jon.

Her work as a DJ has been covered in publications including Vanity Fair, Vogue, Town & Country and Women's Wear Daily.

Gubelmann has appeared as an in-studio DJ for the Today With Hoda & Jenna program on NBC.

In the mid-2020s she relocated from New York to Lisbon, Portugal while continuing to perform internationally.

== Society and philanthropy ==
Gubelmann has been described as a society hostess in coverage of New York social events.

She has also appeared in society and fashion publications including Vogue, W and Town & Country.

While living in New York City, Gubelmann has served as a chair or committee member for organizations including The New York Botanical Garden, Memorial Sloan-Kettering Cancer Center, the Museum of Modern Art, ACRIA, AmfAR and God’s Love We Deliver.

She has also participated in events for cultural and philanthropic organizations including the Museum of Modern Art, New York Botanical Garden, amfAR and God's Love We Deliver.

== Personal life ==
In 2003 Gubelmann married Reza Raein at Palm Beach’s Episcopal Church of Bethesda-By-The-Sea. Wedding guests included Tory Burch, Michael Kors, Tamara Mellon and Ivanka Trump.

Gubelmann and Raein divorced in 2007.

She previously lived on the Upper East Side of New York City.

By the mid-2020s Gubelmann relocated to Lisbon, Portugal, where she has been associated with the city's international social and hospitality scene. She appeared on the cover of the Lisbon issue of Avenue magazine featuring members of the international society set who have relocated to the city.
