= Michael S. Gottlieb =

American physician and immunologist (born 1947)

Michael Stuart Gottlieb (born 1947) is an American physician and immunologist known for his 1981 identification of acquired immune deficiency syndrome (AIDS) as a new disease, and for his HIV/AIDS research, HIV/AIDS activism, and philanthropic efforts associated with HIV/AIDS treatment.

== Biography ==
A native of Highland Park, New Jersey, he graduated from the Rutgers Preparatory School (1965) and Rutgers University (1969). He graduated from the University of Rochester School of Medicine (1973) and trained in internal medicine at Strong Memorial Hospital in Rochester, New York. Following a fellowship in immunology at Stanford University in Palo Alto, California, in 1980 Gottlieb accepted an assistant professor of medicine position at the UCLA School of Medicine in Los Angeles.

== Identification of AIDS ==
Beginning in January 1981, Gottlieb, then thirty-three, and several colleagues identified an apparent novel immunologic condition in homosexual men; the condition had common features of cytomegalovirus infection, pneumocystis pneumonia, mucosal candidiasis, and Kaposi's sarcoma, all conditions found rarely outside of immunosuppressed patients. Gottlieb reported an initial five patient series in the June 5, 1981, Morbidity and Mortality Weekly Report and published a more detailed report in December, 1981, in the New England Journal of Medicine. The New England Journal paper included the first description of the CD-4 T cell deficiency which is the immunologic hallmark of HIV infection. The work of Gottlieb and others suggested that these patients had an acquired immunodeficiency, characterized by depressed T-lymphocyte numbers and function, allowing for potentially fatal opportunistic infections. Initially, the researchers termed the disease Gay-Related Immune Deficiency (GRID); in 1982 this syndrome became known as AIDS, a consequence of infection by Human immunodeficiency virus (HIV).

Physician Joel Weisman was one of Gottlieb's early collaborators in the identification of AIDS. Weisman's practice treated a large number of gay men, some of whom were among the first identified AIDS patients.

Gottlieb was Rock Hudson's doctor following the actor's AIDS diagnosis until his death in 1985. He was also physician to the late Elizabeth Glaser, co-founder of the Elizabeth Glaser Pediatric AIDS Foundation (EGPAF). In 1987 he resigned from the full-time UCLA faculty, and established a private practice of internal medicine and clinical immunology. In the period 1981–1987 he published 50+ papers on various aspects of HIV infection and treatment. He was an investigator on the early clinical trials of AZT that led to approval by the U.S. Food and Drug Administration (FDA) in 1987. Gottlieb was the principal investigator on a $10.3 million National Institutes of Health contract for an AIDS Clinical Trials Group (ACTG) awarded to UCLA to test potential therapies for HIV. His work in the early years of the epidemic is chronicled in Randy Shilts' book And the Band Played On.

== AIDS research philanthropy ==
Gottlieb, Elizabeth Taylor, and Mathilde Krim were founding chairs of the American Foundation for AIDS Research. The organization was established with a $250,000 gift from the estate of Rock Hudson. He served on the boards of AIDS Project Los Angeles (APLA), the Pasadena AIDS Services Center and the Global AIDS Interfaith Alliance (www.thegaia.org), an NGO working in Malawi, Africa. He is currently Medical Advisor to GAIA and to the Elizabeth Taylor AIDS Foundation.

== Clinical practice ==
Gottlieb is certified with the American Board of Medical Specialties in Internal Medicine and Allergy & Immunology. He is affiliated with two hospitals, Cedars-Sinai Medical Center and the Olympia Medical Center where he is Committee Chairman of Bioethics. He continues on the faculty of the David Geffen School of Medicine at UCLA with the rank of Associate Clinical Professor of Medicine.

In 1989 Gottlieb and two other physicians were sent letters of reprimand by the Medical Board of California for "allegedly over-prescribing controlled substances" to actress Elizabeth Taylor. He attempted to dispute the Letter of Reprimand; his attorney's request was rejected by the board.

In 1997, Gottlieb was inducted into the Rutgers University Hall of Distinguished Alumni, and in 2007, he was awarded the Charles Force Hutchison and Marjorie Smith Hutchison Medal by the University of Rochester.

In 2019, he joined the APLA Health medical team; he retired in late 2023.
