= Thomas Hannan =

Thomas Hannan may refer to:

- Thomas Hannan (Virginia settler) (1757–1835), American settler and Revolutionary War soldier
- Thomas Hannan (activist) (1950–1991), opera singer and HIV/AIDS activist
- Tommy Hannan (born 1980), American Olympic gold medal-winning swimmer
