= Joseph Sonnabend =

South African physician (1933–2021)

Joseph Sonnabend FRCP Ed
- Born: 6 January 1933; Johannesburg, Union of South Africa
- Died: 24 January 2021 (aged 88); London, England
- Education: University of the Witwatersrand (MBBCh)
- Occupations: Physician and clinical researcher
- Known for: Pioneering HIV/AIDS research
- Relatives: Yolanda Sonnabend (sister)
- Website: aidsperspective.net

Joseph Adolph Sonnabend (6 January 1933 – 24 January 2021) was a South African physician, scientist and HIV/AIDS researcher, notable for pioneering community-based research, the propagation of safe sex to prevent infection, and an early multifactorial model of AIDS.

As one of the first physicians to notice among his gay male patients the immune deficiency that would later be named AIDS, during the 1980s and 1990s he treated many hundreds of HIV-positive people. During the height of the AIDS crisis, Sonnabend helped create several AIDS organisations, including the AIDS Medical Foundation (now amfAR), the nonprofit Community Research Initiative (now ACRIA), which pioneered community-based research, and the PWA Health Group, the first and largest formally recognised buyers' club.

Sonnabend became controversial for advocating that gay men change their sexual behaviors to avoid sexually transmitted infections, rather than to just have fewer sexual partners, as advocated by Gay Men's Health Crisis and other gay community organizations, and for hypothesizing a multi-factorial model of causation, including for a period of time after discovery of HIV. He was widely respected as a pioneering and compassionate clinician and researcher.

== Background ==
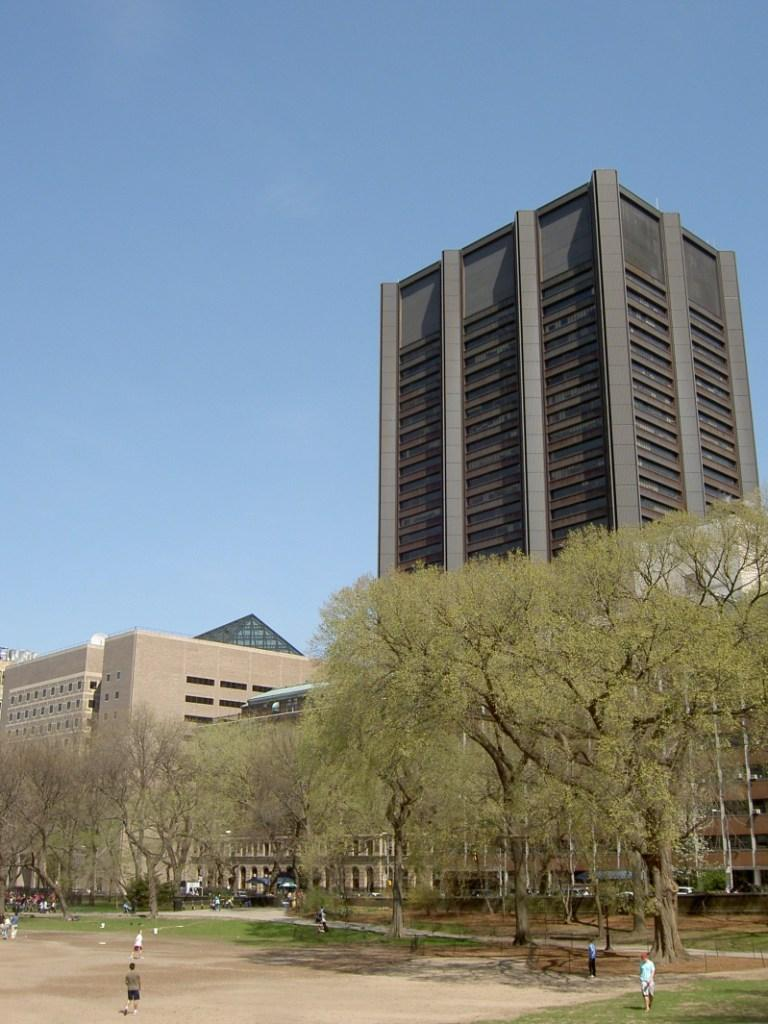
Mount Sinai School of Medicine, where Sonnabend was an associate professor in the early 1970s

Sonnabend was born on 6 January 1933 in Johannesburg, South Africa, and grew up in Bulawayo, Southern Rhodesia (now Zimbabwe). His mother was a physician and his father a sociologist. Both parents were Jewish immigrants from Europe.

He trained in infectious diseases at the University of the Witwatersrand in Johannesburg and the Royal College of Physicians of Edinburgh. During the 1960s he conducted research at the National Institute for Medical Research in London, where he worked under Alick Isaacs, a pioneer of interferon research.

In the early 1970s Sonnabend moved to New York City to be an associate professor at the Mount Sinai School of Medicine. After losing his interferon research grant he worked at Kings County Hospital Center and as Director of Continuing Medical Education at the Bureau of VD Control for the New York City Department of Health. In 1978 he started a private clinic for sexually transmitted infections in Greenwich Village, for which he was renowned.

Sonnabend died on 24 January 2021 at Wellington Hospital in London, as a result of complications arising from a heart attack he had suffered three weeks earlier.

== Early AIDS work ==
Sonnabend was one of the first physicians to notice among his gay male patients the immune deficiency that would later be named AIDS. His background in microbiology, virology, infectious diseases and prior experience of working with immunocompromised transplant patients helped him to conduct some of the earliest research into AIDS, often at his own expense, independently of government agencies that were slow to respond to the epidemic, In 1983 he was founding editor of one of the first AIDS journals, AIDS Research (renamed AIDS Research and Human Retroviruses in 1986, after Sonnabend was fired from the journal).

=== Multifactorial model of AIDS ===
Prior to the identification of HIV as the cause of AIDS in 1984, Sonnabend's investigations led him to propose that AIDS among gay men might be caused by multiple factors including Epstein–Barr virus and repeated exposure to cytomegalovirus and semen. This suggestion conflicted with the view that a single agent was likely responsible, which Sonnabend did not rule out.

Sonnabend's "multifactorial model" led him to argue from very early in the emerging pandemic that frequent unprotected anal sex increased the risk of what would come to be known as AIDS. This was the inspiration for How to Have Sex in an Epidemic, a booklet written under Sonnabend's guidance in 1983 by two of his patients, Michael Callen and Richard Berkowitz, in which this model is described. At the time, attempts to change sexual behaviour and the recommendation of condoms for gay sex met with criticism from many prominent gay community figures. Later, Sonnabend's advice regarding condoms would be accepted as fundamental to HIV prevention.

=== Role in founding AIDS organisations ===
To help fund his research and that of other scientists—and because the CDC were dismissive of his expertise and uninterested in his assistance—Sonnabend contacted his friend Mathilde Krim to ask for help to fund his research. With Krim and others they established the AIDS Medical Foundation (AMF) in 1983. This organisation would later become amfAR, The Foundation for AIDS Research, one of the world's leading nonprofit supporters of HIV/AIDS research, prevention and advocacy.

Pneumocystis jirovecii cysts from bronchoalveolar lavage, stained with Toluidin blue O stain

A pioneer of community-based research in the absence of effective government efforts, Sonnabend also helped to establish the nonprofit Community Research Initiative (CRI, later renamed CRIA, then ACRIA) in New York in 1987. One of CRI's early achievements was a trial that contributed to the approval of inhaled pentamidine for preventing Pneumocystis pneumonia, a common AIDS-related infection. Sonnabend served as medical director of CRI/CRIA until 1996.

Sonnabend was particularly concerned by the ethical issues around the AIDS crisis, winning the Nellie Westerman Prize for Research in Ethics with his co-authors in 1983 for the article "Confidentiality, Informed Consent and Untoward Social Consequences in Research on a 'New Killer Disease' (AIDS)" in the journal Clinical Research. He has written about how the AIDS crisis required a "more intimate" kind of practice; Dr Krim described that "he's the only doctor I know who goes to every funeral".

This concern led him to found the PWA Health Group with Michael Callen and Thomas Hannan in 1986. This non-profit organisation was the first and largest formally recognised AIDS buyers' club, which aimed to widen access to promising AIDS therapies not yet approved by the FDA; the PWA Health Group went on to become an important source of AIDS treatment education and advocacy. In 2000, PWA Health Group merged with Direct Aids Alternative Information Resources (DAAIR), but the combined organisation closed in 2003 and was superseded in July of the following year by the New York Buyers' Club.

== Controversies ==
As a revered physician, Sonnabend was renowned for protecting and promoting patients' rights. He did not shy away from criticising the scientific establishment when he felt it was failing to put patients' interests first. He often disagreed with mainstream opinion on AIDS.

=== Views on AIDS treatment and causation ===
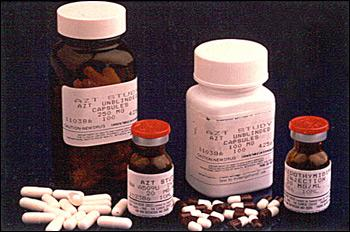
AZT in oral, injectable, and suppository form

In the late 1980s, Sonnabend became a prominent critic of the use of AZT monotherapy to treat asymptomatic, HIV-positive people, which he thought was based on insufficient clinical evidence. Nevertheless, he did prescribe the drug in short courses for people with indications of elevated interferon, which he believed might play an important role in pathogenesis and could be controlled by AZT. In 2006 he expressed his view that high doses of AZT had "killed thousands" during the late 1980s and early 1990s.

Until the late 1990s Sonnabend continued to assert that the issue of AIDS causation "remained open" and that many factors might be involved. This led some researchers and activists to associate him with "AIDS denialists" who deny that HIV has any role in AIDS—a charge that Sonnabend denied:

I was kind of surprised to find myself on the outside. I had rather thought that I represented a kind of academic caution that I took for granted to be the norm. I always believed my criticisms were reasonable and not radical.

His unconventional views on the causes and treatment of AIDS led to accusations of malpractice; he says he was shunned by mainstream scientists and refused funding.

Sonnabend became an early advocate for combination antiretroviral therapy, which he prescribed to numerous patients. However he strongly disagreed with early US guidelines that recommended treating people during the initial stages of HIV infection (known as "hit early, hit hard").

The effects of modern medication helped to change Sonnabend's views on AIDS causation, leading him to assert that, "the evidence now strongly supports a role for HIV." Nevertheless, he still disagreed with the scientific consensus, and maintained that people infected with HIV only develop AIDS if exposed to cofactors such as other viruses and bacteria. He suggested that in many people HIV lies dormant without provoking a sufficient immune response to generate a positive antibody test result (seroconversion).

=== Other controversial views ===
In the 1980s, Sonnabend criticised activists who he believed were overplaying the threat of a heterosexual AIDS epidemic in America, causing a rift that led to his resignation from AMF. He also suggested that much of the funding for fighting AIDS in Africa has been misspent:

There's a place for AIDS drugs and prevention campaigns, but it's not the only answer. We need to roll out clean water and proper sanitation. Do something about nutrition. Put in some basic health infrastructure. Develop effective drugs for malaria and TB, and get them to everyone who needs them.

== Assessments of Sonnabend's career ==
Despite his unconventional and often controversial opinions, mainstream AIDS researchers have in recent years become less critical of Sonnabend, recognising his devotion as a physician and patients' champion. According to Anthony Fauci, director of the National Institute of Allergy and Infectious Diseases:

He is one of the true soldiers in the war against HIV. He is a model for a real translation of care to the patient. In terms of the controversy surrounding his work, I think, in general, at the end of the day, most would agree that his contributions have been positive. He is an outstanding man.

In 2005, he retired from medical practice and moved to London. On World AIDS Day that year, he was awarded a Red Ribbon Leadership Award from the National HIV/AIDS Partnership. In 2000, he was recognised as an inaugural Award of Courage Honoree by amfAR:

Joseph Sonnabend, M.D., made Olympian contributions to the fight against AIDS during years when this was a lonely and thankless endeavor. He designed community-based clinical trials when there were few precedents for such research, and he displayed ethical and professional leadership in virtually every other AIDS-related field of action.

== Personal life ==
Sonnabend was gay, although he fathered two sons in his twenties and was at one time married.

His sister, Yolanda Sonnabend (1935–2015), was a stage designer and artist. His relationship with her was documented in the 2015 film Some Kind of Love.

He composed music throughout his life, and discussed his music on the radio programme Outlook on the BBC World Service in 2018.

He died in January 2021 "after extensive health challenges" and a memorial service was held on 12 April 2021 at Judson Memorial Church in Manhattan, including music composed by Sonnabend and where eulogists included Ivy Kwan Arce, Sean Strub, Kyle Clifford, Rebecca Jordan-Young, Rebecca Pringle Smith, Jack Waters, Ash Kotak, and Miriam Lewis Sabin.
