= Cutlers Court =

American syndicated court show

- Genre: Nontraditional/dramatized court show
- Starring: Dana Tippin Cutler & Keith Cutler (judges) Tashi Simmons (bailiff)
- Country of origin: United States
- Original language: English
- No. of seasons: 4
- No. of episodes: 319

Production
- Executive producers: Ross Babbit, David Bulhack, Gary Apple, Tom Cappello, Scott Thigpen
- Running time: 21 minutes
- Production companies: Crazy Legs Television; Big Fish Entertainment; Playing Field Entertainment

Original release
- Network: First-run syndication
- Release: September 11, 2023 – present

Cutlers Court is an American nontraditional/dramatized court show produced by Crazy Legs Productions and Playing Field Entertainment. The program features trial attorneys Dana and Keith Cutler presiding over real-life relationship cases. The series currently tapes in Atlanta, Georgia.

== Production ==
In August 2023, it was announced that Cutlers Court would launch on broadcast and cable stations. It subsequently debuted September 11, 2023. It is the first and only judge show to feature a married couple. Though both Keith and Dana are practicing attorneys, neither had ever been judges.

Before Cutlers Court, their previous show was canceled after the takeover of MGM by Amazon, when the company ceased production of Couples Court with the Cutlers.
