= Morbidity and Mortality Weekly Report =

Weekly epidemiological report published by the U.S. Centers for Disease Control (CDC)

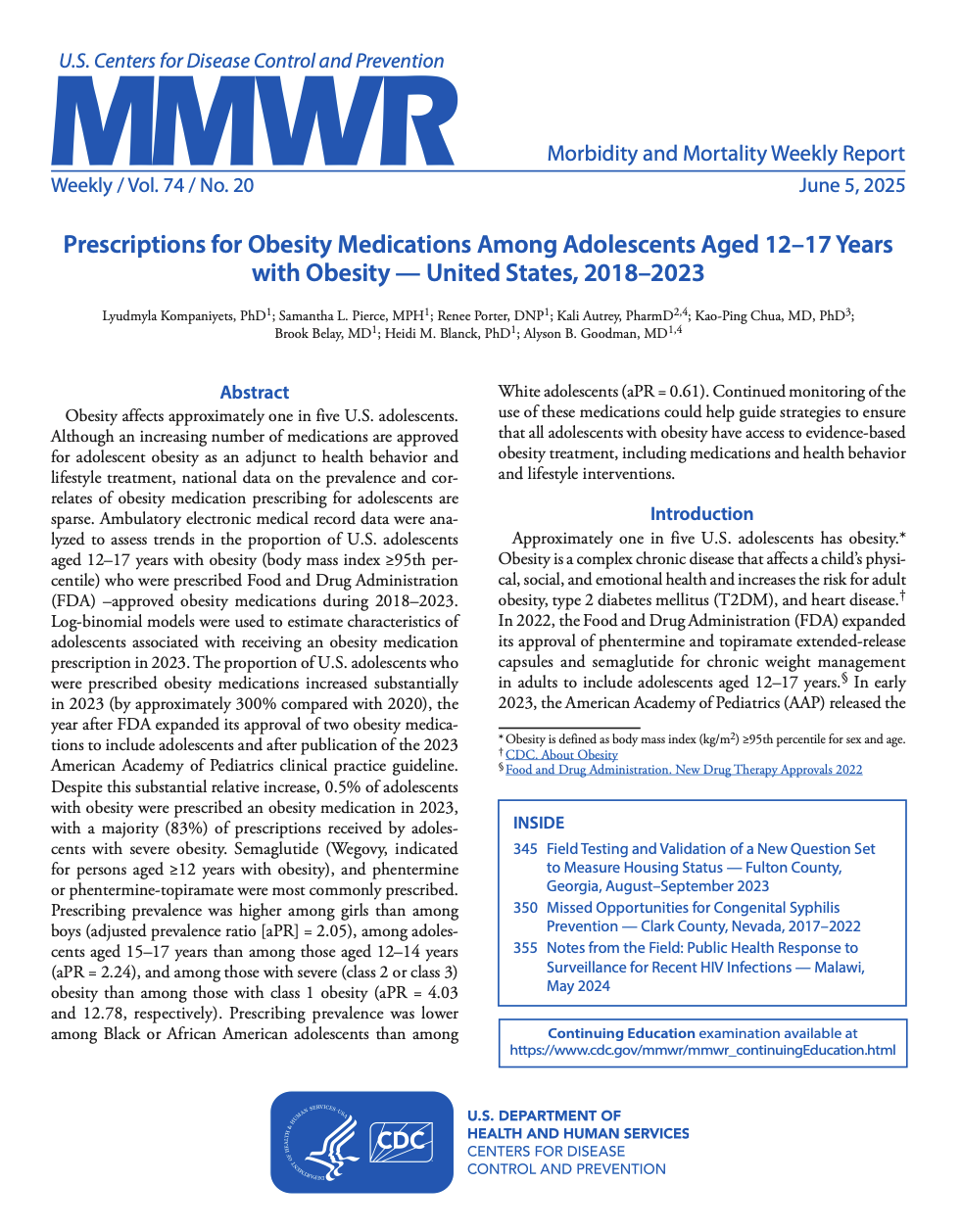
- Discipline: Epidemiology
- Language: English
- Edited by: Leonard Jack

Publication details
- Former names: Morbidity and Mortality; Weekly Mortality Index; Weekly Health Index
- History: 1930–present
- Publisher: Centers for Disease Control and Prevention (United States)
- Frequency: Weekly
- Open access: Yes
- Impact factor: 16.2 (2025)

Standard abbreviations
- ISO 4: Morb. Mortal. Wkly. Rep.

Indexing
- ISSN: 0149-2195 (print); 1545-861X (web)
- JSTOR: 01492195

Links
- Journal homepage

The Morbidity and Mortality Weekly Report (MMWR) is a series of epidemiological science periodicals published by the United States Centers for Disease Control and Prevention (CDC). The MMWR series comprises 4 publications: the Weekly Report (MMWR Weekly), published weekly on Thursdays, and 3 titles presenting longer-form reports published on an ad hoc basis: MMWR Recommendations and Reports, MMWR Surveillance Summaries, and MMWR Supplements. MMWR was originally established as Weekly Health Index in 1930, changing its title to Weekly Mortality Index in 1941 and Morbidity and Mortality in 1952. It acquired its current name in 1976. It is the main vehicle for publishing public health information and recommendations that have been received by the CDC from state health departments. Material published in the report is in the public domain and may be reprinted without permission. As of 2026, the journal’s acting editor-in-chief is Leonard Jack, who also serves as editor-in-chief of the CDC's peer-reviewed journal Preventing Chronic Disease.

According to Journal Citation Reports, 2025 2-year impact factors for the MMWR series (and rankings out of 443 publications in the “Public, Environment and Occupation Health’ category) were

- Morbidity and Mortality Weekly Report: 16.2 (rank 7th)
- Surveillance Summaries: 96.9 (rank 1st)
- Recommendations and Reports: 51.3 (rank 2nd)

MMWR Supplements was not given a 2025 impact factor.

== Publication history ==
MMWR has its roots in the establishment of the Public Health Service (PHS). On January 3, 1896, the Public Health Service began publishing Public Health Reports. Morbidity and mortality statistics were published in Public Health Reports until January 20, 1950, when they were transferred to a new publication of the PHS National Office of Vital Statistics called the Weekly Morbidity Report. In 1952, NOVS changed the name of this publication to the Morbidity and Mortality Weekly Report, which continues through the current day (2026).

== Notable articles ==
Several notable articles have been published in the report including:

- The spread of hepatitis A among attendees of jam band concert tours (September 2003)
- Several dozen deaths in teens participating in what is called the "choking game" (February 2008)
- A report about the elevated death rate among fishermen in the Pacific Northwest (April 2008)
- Improvements in public health after the implementation of municipal smoking bans (January 2009)
- The initial reports of a novel swine flu virus which led to the 2009 flu pandemic (April 24, 2009)

On the other hand, there have been articles that have been controversial, such as a report stating a low concerns for risks of elevated blood levels of lead in Washington, DC (April 2004). The article was notable and later criticized for not emphasizing the risks, and now is available together with two amending "notices to the readers" by CDC from 2010.

== First report of AIDS ==
Five cases of Pneumocystis carinii pneumonia (PCP) were reported in what turned out to be the first reporting of AIDS in the medical literature (June 5, 1981). Los Angeles-based general practitioner Joel Weisman and immunologist Michael S. Gottlieb of the UCLA Medical Center had encountered a series of gay male patients with symptoms that appeared to be immune system disorders including significant loss of weight and swollen lymph nodes, accompanied by fever and rashes, in addition to two patients with chronic diarrhea, depressed white blood cell counts and fungal infections. Gottlieb diagnosed these and a number of his other patients as having pneumocystis pneumonia. A report they jointly wrote and published in the June 5, 1981, issue of Morbidity and Mortality Weekly Report, described their patients as "5 young men, all active homosexuals, [who] were treated for biopsy-confirmed Pneumocystis carinii pneumonia at 3 different hospitals in Los Angeles, California" of which "[t]wo of the patients died" by the time of the original report. This notice has been recognized as the first published report marking the official start of the AIDS pandemic and as "the first report on AIDS in the medical literature".

== Drinking water lead report controversy ==
=== Background ===
Between 2001 and 2003, various tests showed that the lead content in drinking water in Washington DC more that 10% of the tests were higher than 15 ppb (parts per billion), which was the "action level" fixed by U.S. Environmental Protection Agency (EPA) for stagnant first draw water, and not indicative of typical usage. Some of the tests were prompted by EPA's lead and copper rule, while others were conducted by professor Marc Edwards, while trying to find the causes of an increased rate of pinhole leaks in copper water pipes. He found some rather high values in a few households, sometimes exceeding 1250 PPM. From 2002 on the matter started to be noted by news media.

Lead is well known to have toxic effects, especially for embryos and small children. Even in small doses, lead poisoning may lead to permanent intelligence deficiencies and concentration difficulties.

=== Report details ===
On March 30, 2004, an "MMWR dispatch", Blood Lead Levels in Residents of Homes with Elevated Lead in Tap Water – District of Columbia, 2004 was made available on the MMWR web site. It was then published by CDC as "MMWR Weekly, April 2, 2004 / 53(12); 268–270". Its principal author was Mary Jean Brown, who was the head of the lead poisoning branch of CDC. The report "summarizes the results of the preliminary investigations, which indicated that the elevated water lead levels might have contributed to a small increase in blood lead levels (BLLs)". The report describes the background, and the various kinds of blood tests it employed, and explicitly states: "All blood tests were used in this analysis." There is no mention at all of any test results not being available, not even in the caveat section, where other potential sources of error are discussed.

The report concludes that the high amounts of lead in the drinking water may have led to a slight rise of the blood levels; however, it claimed that "no children were identified with BLLs >10 μg/dL, even in homes with the highest water lead levels". It notes that 10 μg/dL was "CDC's BLL of concern for children" since 1991. The report also claimed that the average levels were sinking with time. On the other hand, the report found some cases of children with BLLs > 5 μg/dL; and also stated that actually "no safe BLL has been identified". Therefore, the report recommends that efforts should be made to eliminate lead in children's blood entirely, and in particular, that the authorities should take measures to ensure that the amount of lead in drinking water always should be less than 15 PPM.

The report does not in itself provide any recommendations to the ordinary Washington, DC inhabitants, but it notes that the District of Columbia Department of Health has "recommended that young children and pregnant and breast-feeding women refrain from drinking unfiltered tap water".

=== Criticism of the report ===
The report later was strongly criticized, by Marc Edwards, some news media, and ultimately by the United States House Committee on Science, Space and Technology.

Marc Edwards initiated a study, which included investigating health aspects. At first, he was sponsored by EPA; but when they interrupted their support, he financed it out of his own pocket. He claimed that this study, employing raw data also available to the CDC study, had found clear evidence of a correlation between rather high amounts of lead in the water on the one hand, and rather high amounts of lead in the blood of children on the other. Specifically, there were cases known to him, of children with BBL clearly exceeding 10 μg/dL; but these cases were absent from the material presented in the MMWR. Marc Edwards and pediatrician Dana Best of Children's National Medical Center in Washington, actually found a marked increase in high-level results from 2001 to 2004, among small children. The results of Marc Edwards et al. came from analysis of the same raw data as those underlying the 2004 CDC report. In 2007, Edwards wrote to the CDC's associate director of science, James Stephens, questioning the report's conclusions and methodology, and the competence of its principal author. In 2008, Stephens answered him: "We have examined CDC's role in the study and have found no evidence of misconduct."

According to Salon, there was an evident dip in critical year 2003 (when the lead in the drinking water peaked), in the data present in the CDC files, there were test results for 15,755 children in 2002, only 9,765 children in 2003, and 18,038 children in 2004, At the time, Mary Jean Brown had questioned the dip, and had gotten the answer that it was due to a private laboratory not having reported the low values they had found. She had accepted the answer. Salon also claimed that the CDC had found a link between lead pipes and high childhood blood lead levels in the district in 2007, but had not publicized the study.

In 2009, the United States House of Representatives' Science and Technology Committee opened a congressional investigation into the 2004 CDC report. Investigators found that although the CDC and city health department reported dangerous lead levels in 193 children in 2003, the actual number was 486 according to records taken directly from the testing laboratories. In 2010, in their final report, the committee concluded that the CDC knowingly used flawed data in drafting the report, leading to "scientifically indefensible" claims in the 2004 paper. It also cited the CDC for failing to publicize later research showing that the harm was more serious than the 2004 report suggested.

=== Response to the criticism ===
The CDC did not withdraw the report, but in 2010 amended it with two "notices to the readers", with the following explanations. The CDC maintained that the report essentially is correct, but admitted that the presentation was misleading, as regards the absence of data, and as regards the claim that no children with BLLs above the alert threshold 10 μg/dL were found. That claim, they stated, "was misleading because it referred only to data from the cross-sectional study and did not reflect findings of concern from the separate longitudinal study that showed that children living in homes serviced by a lead water pipe were more than twice as likely as other DC children to have had a blood lead level ≥10 μg/dL". Moreover, the CDC emphasizes, that the original report did warn for negative effects on health of the BLLs it did report, did note that there are no safe known limits, and did demand actions for reducing the level of lead in drinking water. They also maintain, that the overall trend was towards sinking BLLs, even when the full data set is taken into consideration.

== Political pressure during the Trump administrations ==
=== First Trump Administration (2017-2021) ===
During the COVID-19 pandemic in the United States, MMWR came under pressure from political appointees at the Department of Health and Human Services (HHS) to modify its reporting to not conflict with President Donald Trump. Starting in June 2020, Michael Caputo, the HHS assistant secretary for public affairs, and his chief advisor Paul Alexander tried to change, delay, suppress, and retroactively edit MMWR stories about the effectiveness of potential treatments for COVID-19, the transmissibility of the virus, and other issues where the president had taken a public stance. Alexander tried unsuccessfully to get personal approval of all issues of MMWR before publication. Caputo claimed this was necessary because MMWR reports were being tainted by "political content"; he demanded to know the political leanings of scientists who reported that hydroxychloroquine had little benefit as a treatment while Trump was saying the opposite. In emails to the head of CDC, Alexander accused CDC scientists of attempting to "hurt the president" and writing "hit pieces on the administration". On September 14, 2020, the Select Subcommittee on the Coronavirus Crisis of the U.S. House of Representatives requested "transcribed interviews" with seven CDC and HHS personnel "to determine the scope of political interference with CDC's scientific reports and other efforts to combat the pandemic, the impact of this interference on CDC's mission, whether this interference is continuing, and the steps that Congress may need to take to stop it before more Americans die needlessly."

=== Second Trump Administration (2025-present) ===
MMWR had its first-ever break in its 60-year history in 2025 when the January 23 and 30 releases were not published, due to the second Trump administration’s "pause" on public communications by all branches of HHS. The pause elicited widespread criticism, including from former MMWR editors. MMWR resumed publishing February 6 with two articles about potential health risks of recent Los Angeles area wildfires, coming days after Trump had criticized California governor Gavin Newsom over his handling of the January 2025 Southern California wildfires. Content scheduled in the skipped issues, including three studies about the then-ongoing avian flu outbreak, appeared in subsequent weeks.

In July 2025 MedPage Today reported that all scientific articles in the journal were required to obtain clearance from HHS Secretary Robert F. Kennedy Jr. prior to publication, although HHS disputed the claim.

MMWR stopped publishing October 1, 2025 at the start of the US federal government shutdown, and on October 10 MMWR staff were laid off. The firings were part of mass layoffs in 2025 ordered by Trump administration, which had stated its intent to lay off federal workers in "Democrat" programs, but were reversed the next day. MMWR resumed publication November 20, 2025, the week following funding and reopening of the US government. MMWR also missed its February 5, 2026 publishing date because of the January 31 - February 3 lapse in appropriations.

The Washington Post reported on April 9, 2026 that Jay Bhattacharya, acting director of the CDC, had delayed a report that showed that the COVID-19 vaccine reduced the likelihood of hospitalizations and emergency room visits by half in the previous winter. The report had passed the CDC's scientific review process and was originally scheduled for release March 25, but Bhattacharya expressed doubts over its methodology. The methodology, which was a standard approach used to measure vaccine effectiveness for respiratory viruses, had been used in an influenza study published by MMWR the week before and in several studies in MMWR and peer-reviewed medical journals in the years prior. The Post reported on April 22 that the study had been fully rejected and that acting and former CDC officials believe it was rejected because it conflicted with the anti-vaccine views Robert F. Kennedy Jr. In response to a statement that the move was political interference, Bhattacharya stated he had "raised specific concerns about the statistical methodology chosen for the study in question" and that "MMWR is not currently a peer-reviewed journal, but we are working on changing that." Bhattacharya organized a CDC Public Health Grand Rounds to "debate" vaccine effectivness methodology with Martin Kuldorff presenting the administration's position. The study was subsequently published in the peer-reviewed journal JAMA Network Open.
