= Angela Missoni =

Italian fashion businesswoman

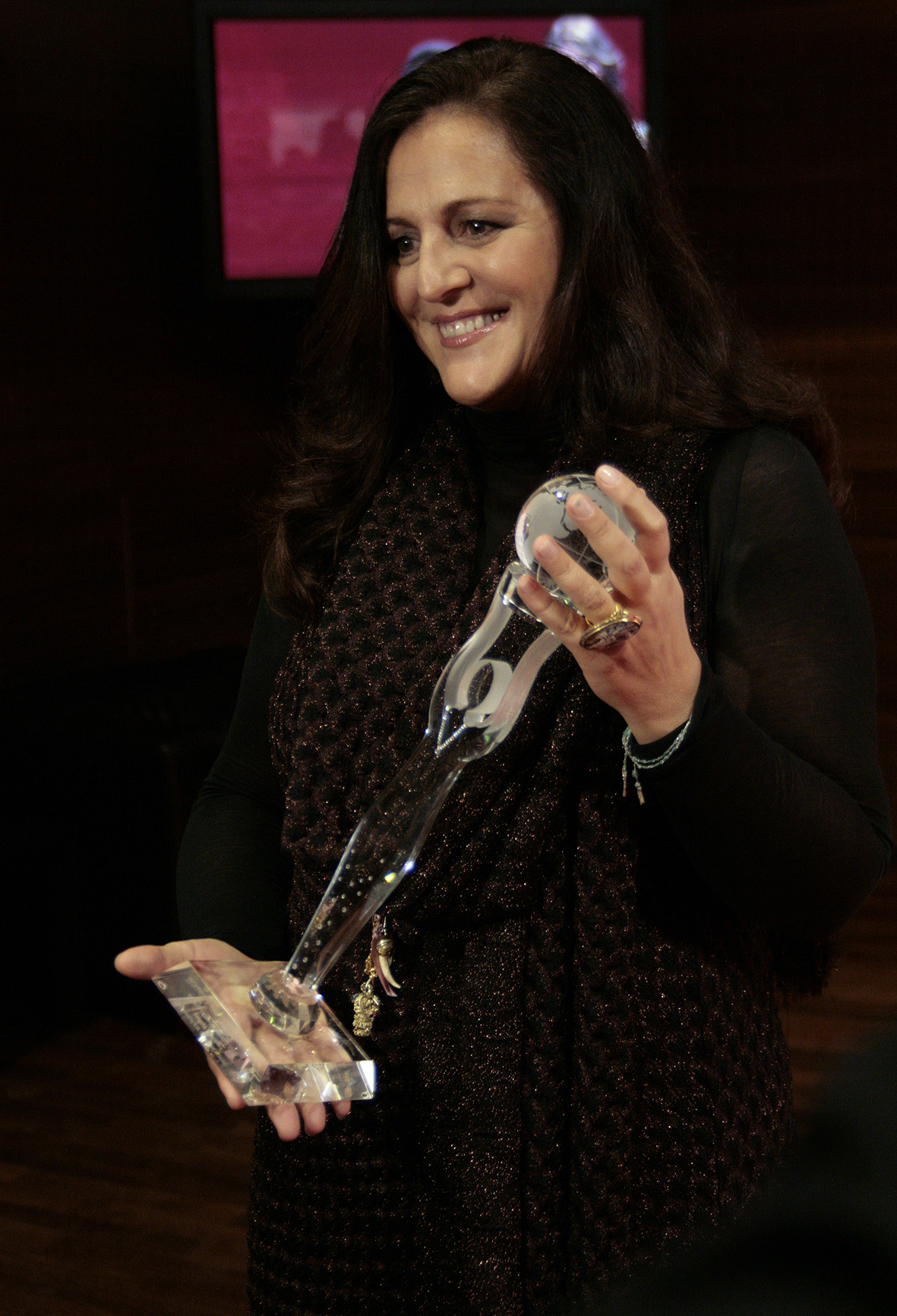
- Born: 1958 Milan
- Occupation: Creative director

Angela Missoni (born 1958) was the creative director and president of Missoni S.p.A. from 1997-2018 she has run the company when she took over from her parents Rosita and Ottavio Missoni their knitwear business. She has since transformed the company into a fashion giant, featuring evening wear, swimwear, tailoring and more, developing a reputation for keeping the Missoni design company fresh and relevant for 60+ years. Missoni is well known as a supporter of human rights and women's issues.

== Early life and career ==
Missoni was born in 1958 in Milan. She is the third child of Ottavio and Rosita Missoni. In 1993, Missoni started her own label, but in 1997, she took over from her mother as creative director of the family brand.

Missoni did not enter the fashion industry until her children were old enough to attend school; she started her career as a nursery teacher. She started her own label at this time, and after a few seasons there, she succeeded her mother as Missoni's creative director. In 1997, she debuted her first collection for the brand.

Missoni is the creative director and president of Missoni. She has collaborated with several fashion brands, including Valentino, Converse, Havaianas and Bugaboo. Missoni launched a collaboration with Target in September 2011 for a fashion and home collection. The line became successful and sold out in less than 24 hours.

After completing the Autumn/Winter 2021 collection, Angela resigned as creative director in May 2021. She remains president of Missoni, guiding the family business into the future.

== Impact ==
She has been recognized for her work in a variety of ways including, being among 12 female recipients of the Women's World Award at the 2009 World Fashion Award. In 2014, Missoni was given an honorary doctorate of humane letters by the School of Fashion at the Academy of Art University in San Francisco. In 2016 she received the design award from the Museum of Arts and Design. In 2017 she received the Fashion Group International of Dallas (FGI) Lifetime Achievement Award. In 2017 she received the amfAR's Award of Courage.

== Personal life ==
Missoni married media events producer Marco Maccapani in 1982. The couple have three children together Margherita, Francesco and Theresa. Maccapani and Missoni divorced in 1989 after seven years of marriage.

She currently lives in Milan with her long-time partner, Bruno Ragazzi, who runs Versace's homewares business.
