= Couples Court with the Cutlers =

American court show

- Genre: Nontraditional court show
- Created by: David Armour
- Directed by: Stacie Saugen
- Starring: Ron Cross (bailiff)
- Judges: Dana Tippin Cutler; Keith Cutler
- Country of origin: United States
- Original language: English
- No. of seasons: 3

Production
- Executive producers: David Armour; Myeshia Mizuno; Barry Poznick; Angela Smith
- Production locations: Georgia Public Broadcasting; Atlanta, Georgia
- Running time: 30 minutes
- Production companies: Georgia Film Office; 79th & York Entertainment; Orion Television

Original release
- Network: First-run syndication
- Release: September 18, 2017 – February 2020

Couples Court with the Cutlers is an American nontraditional court show that ran from 2017 to 2020. The program was presided over by married attorneys Keith and Dana Cutler, who were both previously practicing attorneys in Kansas City, Missouri, and had been married and working together in law for nearly three decades when the program premiered. Neither one, however, had served as judges prior to the start of the show. Additionally, the Cutlers were the first married couple to preside over a television courtroom program.

== Format ==
Each episode centered on a couple experiencing a dispute, most commonly an allegation that one partner had been unfaithful. The couple presented their respective claims to the Cutlers, who reviewed evidence and questioned the participants; the allegations made by the participants were investigated using evidence such as cell phone records, GPS data, DNA evidence, surveillance footage, and lie-detector tests.

== Production ==
The series was produced by Orion Television, a subsidiary of Metro-Goldwyn-Mayer (MGM), and was created by David Armour, who had previously worked on Lauren Lake's Paternity Court. Production began in Atlanta, Georgia, in June 2017. The original run of Couples Court with the Cutlers ended in February 2020.

Following the end of the series, the Cutlers later returned to television with a new courtroom program, Cutlers Court, which premiered in September 2023.
