= Some Kind of Love (film) =

- Directed by: Thomas Burstyn
- Written by: Barbara Sumner
- Produced by: Trish Dolman; Barbara Sumner
- Starring: Yolanda Sonnabend; Joseph Sonnabend
- Cinematography: Thomas Burstyn
- Edited by: Peter Roeck
- Music by: John Korsrud
- Production companies: Cloud South Films; Screen Siren Pictures
- Distributed by: Union Pictures
- Release date: January 4, 2015 (Palm Springs)
- Running time: 78 minutes
- Country: Canada
- Language: English

Some Kind of Love is a Canadian documentary film, directed by Thomas Burstyn and released in 2015. The film centres on Yolanda Sonnabend, a British artist whose brother, medical researcher Joseph Sonnabend, has moved back into her dilapidated house in London to help care for her due to her increasing frailty.

Burstyn received a Canadian Screen Award nomination at the 4th Canadian Screen Awards in 2016, for Best Cinematography in a Documentary.
