= Orion Pictures =

American film and distribution company

Orion Releasing, LLC
- Logo used since 2022
- Trade name: Orion Pictures
- Formerly: Orion Pictures Company (1978–1982); Orion Pictures Corporation (1982–2013)
- Type: Subsidiary
- Industry: Film
- Founded: 1978; 48 years ago (original; as Orion Pictures Corporation); 2013; 13 years ago (relaunch; under the Orion Pictures label)
- Founders: Arthur B. Krim; Eric Pleskow; Mike Medavoy; William Bernstein; Robert Benjamin
- Defunct: 1999; 27 years ago (original)
- Fate: Folded into Metro-Goldwyn-Mayer, currently active as a copyright holder for Metro-Goldwyn Mayer (original)
- Headquarters: Los Angeles, California, U.S.
- Area served: Worldwide
- Key people: Alana Mayo (president)
- Products: Motion pictures
- Parent: Viacom (1986–1988); Metromedia (1988–1997); Metro-Goldwyn-Mayer; (1997–2023); Amazon MGM Studios; (2023–present)
- Divisions: Orion Classics

Orion Releasing, LLC (doing business as Orion Pictures) is an American film production and distribution company owned by the Amazon MGM Studios subsidiary of Amazon. In its current incarnation, Orion focuses primarily on producing, distributing, and acquiring independent and specialty films made by underrepresented filmmakers.

It was founded in 1978 as Orion Pictures Corporation, a joint venture between Warner Bros. and three former senior executives at United Artists (UA). The company produced and released films from 1978 through 1999 and was also involved in television production and syndication in the 1980s and early 1990s. It was one of the largest mini-major studios during its early years, when it worked with prominent directors such as Woody Allen, James Cameron, Jonathan Demme, and Oliver Stone. Four films distributed by Orion won Academy Awards for Best Picture: Amadeus (1984), Platoon (1986), Dances with Wolves (1990), and The Silence of the Lambs (1991).

In 1997, Orion was acquired by Metro-Goldwyn-Mayer (MGM), and was folded into MGM in 1999. MGM later revived the Orion name for television in 2013 and relaunched Orion Pictures a year later. In 2022, Amazon acquired MGM, making it the new owner of Orion Pictures.

== History ==
=== 1978–1981: Beginnings ===
On February 6, 1978, three executives of Transamerica (TA)-owned studio United Artists (UA)—Arthur B. Krim (chairman), Eric Pleskow (president and chief executive officer), and Robert Benjamin (chairman of the finance committee)—quit their jobs. Krim and Benjamin had headed UA since 1951 and subsequently turned around the then-flailing studio with a number of critical and commercial successes. Change had begun once Transamerica purchased UA in 1967 and, within a decade, a rift formed between Krim and Transamerica chairman John R. Beckett concerning the studio's operations. Krim suggested spinning off UA into a separate company which was rejected by Beckett.

The last straw came for Pleskow when he refused to collect and deliver the medical records of UA department heads to Transamerica's offices in San Francisco for the sake of confidentiality. The tensions only worsened when Fortune magazine reported an article on the clash between UA and TA in which Beckett had stated that, if the executives disliked the parent company's treatment of them, they should resign. Krim, Benjamin and Pleskow quit UA on January 13, 1978, followed by the exits of senior vice presidents William Bernstein and Mike Medavoy three days later. The week following the resignations, according to the website Reference for Business, 63 important Hollywood figures took out an advertisement in a trade paper warning Transamerica that it had made a fatal mistake in letting the five men leave. The 'fatal mistake' came true following the box-office disaster of Heaven's Gate in 1980 which led to Transamerica selling UA to Metro-Goldwyn-Mayer (MGM).

That same year, the five men forged a deal with Warner Bros. The executives formed Orion Pictures Company, named after the constellation which they claimed had five main stars (it actually has seven or eight). The new company intended only to finance projects, giving the filmmakers complete creative autonomy; this ideal had been successfully implemented at United Artists. Orion held a $100 million line of credit and its films would be distributed through Warner Bros. Orion, however, was contractually given free rein over distribution and advertising as well as the number and type of films the executives chose to invest in.

In late March 1978, Orion signed its first contract, a two-picture deal with John Travolta's production company. Contracts with actress and director Barbra Streisand; actors James Caan, Jane Fonda, Peter Sellers, Jon Voight, and Burt Reynolds; directors Francis Ford Coppola and Blake Edwards; writer/director John Milius; singer Peter Frampton; and producer Ray Stark soon materialized. Orion also developed a co-financing and distribution deal with EMI Films. In its first year, Orion had fifteen films in production and had a dozen more actors, directors and producers lining up to sign with them.

Benjamin died in October 1979. Orion's first film, A Little Romance, was released in April that year. Later that year, Orion released Blake Edwards' 10 which became a commercial success, the first for Edwards in over a decade (aside from installments of The Pink Panther franchise). Other films released by Orion over the next two years included a few successes such as Caddyshack (1980) and Arthur (1981); critically praised but underperforming films such as The Great Santini (1979), an adaptation of a Pat Conroy novel, and Sidney Lumet's Prince of the City (1981); and pictures by young writer-directors such as Philip Kaufman's The Wanderers (1979) and Nicholas Meyer's debut Time After Time (1979); plus Monty Python's Life of Brian (1979) which Orion only distributed in the United States. Out of the 23 films Orion released between April 1979 and December 1981, only a third of them made a profit. Orion executives were conflicted over financing big-budgeted films and passed on Raiders of the Lost Ark (1981) for that reason.

=== 1982–1986: Split from Warner Bros. ===
By early 1982, Orion had severed its distribution ties with Warner Bros., although the latter continued to distribute Orion's films in Japan until 1991. As part of the deal, the rights to Orion's films made up to that point were sold to Warner Bros. Orion was now looking to have its own distribution network by acquiring another company with such capabilities. The four partners looked into Allied Artists and Embassy Pictures before settling on Filmways. Orion subsequently purchased Filmways and reorganized the flailing company. New employees were hired and all of Filmways' non-entertainment assets (Grosset & Dunlap and Broadcast Electronics) were sold off. Its syndicated subsidiary Filmways Enterprises, was renamed to Orion Entertainment Corporation, and its television division was renamed to Orion Television. Later in 1982, Orion Entertainment Corporation begin handling advertising sales of programs by Colbert Television Sales.

Another result of the merger was that Orion entered television production. Orion's biggest television hit was Cagney & Lacey, which lasted seven seasons on CBS. In 1983, Orion Pictures introduced art-house division Orion Classics with executives who had previously run United Artists Classics.

Out of the initial 18 films released by the firm under the name of Orion Pictures Corporation, ten made profits, five just managed to cover their costs, and three suffered losses under $2 million. One such film, Francis Ford Coppola's The Cotton Club, was mired in legal troubles and Orion lost $3 million of its investment. "We've had some singles and doubles [but haven't] had any home runs," lamented Krim. In September 1984, Orion distributed Amadeus, which garnered many accolades, winning eight Academy Awards, including Best Picture. That year, on April 3, 1984, Orion Pictures launched Orion Entertainment Group, that would consist of four groups, Orion Television, Orion Home Video, Orion Pay Television and Orion Television Syndication, and the new organization would produce and distribute product for television, home video, pay and syndicated markets, with Jamie Kellner serving as president. On October 26, 1984, the company released the James Cameron-directed science fiction film The Terminator which was well received by critics and audience and led to a franchise involving five further films. However, Orion distributed none of the follow-ups.

For Orion, 1985 was a dismal year. All but two films, Desperately Seeking Susan and Code of Silence, made less than $10 million at the United States box office, including an unsuccessful attempt at a James Bond-type franchise, Remo Williams: The Adventure Begins. Orion's haphazard distribution channels and unsuccessful advertising campaigns made it impossible to achieve a hit. Another factor was that Orion was about to venture into the video business and stopped selling home-use rights to its films. Furthermore, the production of the Rodney Dangerfield comedy Back to School was put on hold when a co-producer died, taking the film off of its Christmas 1985 release slate.

In January 1986, Mario Kassar and Andrew Vajna, producers of the Rambo films (the first film, First Blood, was distributed by Orion) attempted to buy $55 million worth of the studio's stock through the duo's company, Anabasis. Had they succeeded, Kassar and Vajna would have controlled the board and laid off every executive save for Krim. Warburg Pincus subsequently limited its 20% stake in Orion to 5%; the remaining stock was acquired by Viacom International. Viacom hoped to use Orion's product for its pay-television channel Showtime. Orion expanded into home video distribution with the formation of Orion Home Entertainment Corporation in 1985, which began distributing videos under the Orion Home Video label in 1987 (before OHV's formation, HBO Video and their predecessors, as well as former Orion's partner Warner Home Video, Vestron Video and Embassy Home Entertainment, had been responsible for home media releases of Orion product).

=== 1986–1991: Metromedia era ===
On May 22, 1986, a 6.5% stake in Orion was purchased by Metromedia, a television and communications company controlled by billionaire (and a friend of Krim's) John Kluge. Metromedia had just divested its television station group to Rupert Murdoch's News Corporation (which would form what is now the Fox network). Kluge's investment in Orion came at the right time; Back to School was a success that earned $90 million at the box office. By March 1987, the studio's fortunes had increased dramatically with a succession of critical and commercial hits, including Platoon (which ultimately won a Best Picture Oscar), Woody Allen's Hannah and Her Sisters, and the sports film Hoosiers. Orion's 1986 offerings drew 18 Academy Award nominations, more than any other studio. In 1987, Orion achieved further success with RoboCop and No Way Out. By this time, Orion's television division had expanded into the lucrative syndicated game show market under the name Century Towers Productions, a reference to Orion's street address. It produced revivals of format inherited from Heatter-Quigley Productions, owned since the late 1960s by Filmways; this included The New Hollywood Squares, which ran from 1986 to 1989, and a revival of High Rollers that aired in the 1987–88 season. 1987 also saw the arrival of former CBS/Fox Video executive Len White, who became president and CEO of Orion Home Video, with plans to release its first home video titles in the third or fourth quarter of that year; he reported to Larry Hilford, who joined the home video division two years earlier.

In January 1987, Kluge faced competition with the arrival of Sumner Redstone, whose theater chain, National Amusements, purchased 6.42% of Orion's stock. National Amusements later acquired Viacom, increasing their Orion stake to 21%, then 26%. Soon Kluge started buying more Orion stock, touching off a battle with Redstone over control of the company. Kluge won on May 20, 1988, when Metromedia took over about 67% of Orion. One analyst told The Wall Street Journal: "This amount is probably so small to Kluge it doesn't matter. He probably burns that up in a weekend."

In 1989, Orion suffered from a disastrous slate of films, placing dead last among larger Hollywood studios by box office revenue. Among its biggest flops that year were Great Balls of Fire!, a biography of Jerry Lee Lewis starring Dennis Quaid and Winona Ryder; She-Devil, a dark comedy starring Meryl Streep and Roseanne Barr; Speed Zone, an action-comedy vehicle for SCTV alumni John Candy, Joe Flaherty, and Eugene Levy; and Miloš Forman's adaptation of Les Liaisons dangereuses, Valmont, which competed with Dangerous Liaisons, also based on the same source material. Test screenings of the "Weird Al" Yankovic comedy UHF were so strong that Orion had high expectations for it, but it flopped at the box office (though it later developed a cult following on video). Also that year, it signed a deal with Nelson Entertainment to distribute titles on videocassette and theatrically.

In February 1990, Orion signed a deal with Columbia Pictures Entertainment in which the much larger studio would pay Orion $175 million to distribute Orion's movies and television programs overseas. Orion had previously licensed its films to individual distributors territory by territory. That same month, Mike Medavoy left Orion and became head of Tri-Star Pictures. Medavoy would be succeeded by Marc Platt.

The box-office returns for Orion's 1990 releases were just as dismal, with failures in The Hot Spot and State of Grace. The only bright spot was Kevin Costner's western epic Dances with Wolves, which won seven Academy Awards, including Best Picture, and grossed $400 million worldwide. A few months later, Orion garnered another winner with The Silence of the Lambs, but these two films could not make up for years of losses. Only Kluge's continued infusions of cash were enough to keep the company afloat, but soon he had had enough.

=== 1991–1995: Bankruptcy ===
Kluge first attempted to sell Orion to businessman (and former 20th Century Fox owner) Marvin Davis. Sony, which had recently purchased Columbia Pictures, was also interested. When those talks fell through, Kluge took drastic steps. First, Orion shut down production. Second, Kluge ordered the sale of several projects, such as The Addams Family (which went to Paramount, though the international rights to the film were retained by Orion), in order to accumulate much-needed cash. Finally, in the spring of 1991, Kluge's people took over the company, leading to the departure of Arthur Krim. Orion's financial problems were so severe that, at the 63rd Annual Academy Awards in March 1991, host Billy Crystal made reference to Orion's debt in his opening monologue, joking that "Reversal of Fortune [is] about a woman in a coma, Awakenings [is] about a man in a coma; and Dances with Wolves [was] released by Orion, a studio in a coma."

It was during this time that ABC stepped in to co-finance and assume production over many of Orion Television's shows it had in production, such as American Detective and Equal Justice. After Orion had to shut the television division down, this resulted in projects like The Chuck Woolery Show, which was planned to be produced by Orion, instead having to find new production companies (such as Group W Productions in the case of Woolery). Gary Nardino, former employee of Orion Television Entertainment, moved on to producing for Lorimar Television, taking some of Orion's projects with him, including Bill & Ted's Excellent Adventures on Fox, and Hearts are Wild, a co-production with Spelling Television, for CBS; talent deals Orion Television had at the time (with Thomas Carter, Robert Townsend, Paul Stajonovich, Clifton Campbell and Deborah Joy Levine) were also taken by Nardino to Lorimar. On November 25, 1991, Orion sold its Hollywood Squares format rights to King World Productions after Orion closed down its television division.

On December 11, 1991, Orion filed for Chapter 11 bankruptcy protection. That same month, Orion was in talks with New Line Cinema, a successful independent film company, to acquire the bankrupt studio. By the following April, Orion and New Line Cinema cancelled their plans on the issue of price. Republic Pictures and the then-new Savoy Pictures also attempted to buy Orion, but no deal materialized.

In February 1992, Bernstein, who was president and chief executive of Orion at that point, resigned from the studio, Bernstein would go on to become executive vice president at Paramount Pictures.

At the Academy Awards ceremony, broadcast on March 30, 1992, Crystal made another reference to Orion, this time about its demise:

Take a great studio like Orion: a few years ago Orion released Platoon, it wins Best Picture. Amadeus, Best Picture. Last year, they released Dances with Wolves wins Best Picture. This year The Silence of the Lambs is nominated for Best Picture. And they can't afford to have another hit! But there is good news and bad news. The good news is that Orion was just purchased, and the bad news is it was bought by the House of Representatives.

The Silence of the Lambs swept all five major Academy Awards; however, a majority of key executives, as well as the talent they had deals with, had left the studio. Hollywood observers had doubts that Orion would be resurrected to its former glory.

In May 1992, it was reported that Pleskow was resigning from Orion on July 1 of that year. stating in the New York Times: "There is little for me to do at this point".

On November 5, 1992, Orion reemerged from bankruptcy. Its reorganization plan would allow for Orion to continue producing and releasing films, but financing for the features would be provided by outside sources, with the studio purchasing the distribution rights to them after their completion.

Orion's bankruptcy also delayed the release of many films the studio had produced or acquired, among them: Love Field (1992), RoboCop 3 (1993), The Dark Half (1993), Blue Sky (1994), Car 54, Where Are You? (1994), Clifford (1994), The Favor (1994), and There Goes My Baby (1994). Orion started releasing these films after their reorganization. Blue Sky won star Jessica Lange an Academy Award for Best Actress in 1995.

In August 1994, Orion Home Video partnered with Streamline Pictures in distributing the latter's licensed anime video titles to general retailers, which animation historian Fred Patten considered a major development in anime's growing popularity in American pop culture.

=== 1995–1997: Metromedia International Group ===
In November 1995, Orion, two other companies controlled by Kluge, and film and television house MCEG Sterling (producer of the Look Who's Talking series) were merged to form the Metromedia International Group. Few of the films released during the four years after bankruptcy protection were successful either critically or commercially.

In 1996, Metromedia acquired production company Motion Picture Corporation of America, and installed its heads, Brad Krevoy and Steve Stabler, as co-presidents of Orion. Both received a six picture put picture distribution deal as a part of their contracts.

In the years ahead, Orion produced very few films, and primarily released films from other producers, including LIVE Entertainment. Orion Classics, minus its founders (who had moved to Sony Pictures Entertainment and founded Sony Pictures Classics), continued to acquire popular art-house films, such as Boxing Helena (1993), before Metromedia merged the subsidiary with Samuel Goldwyn Entertainment in 1996.

=== 1997–1999: Acquisition by Metro-Goldwyn-Mayer ===
In July 1997, Metromedia shareholders approved the sale of Orion Pictures (as well as Samuel Goldwyn Entertainment and Motion Picture Corporation of America) to Metro-Goldwyn-Mayer (MGM). This led to the withdrawal of 85 employees, including Krevoy and Stabler, while 111 other employees were to be laid off within nine months, leaving 25 of them to work at MGM. Orion Pictures also brought with it a two-thousand film library, ten completed movies and five direct-to-video features for future release and the Krevoy and Stabler movie put picture distribution deal. Krevoy and Stabler retained the right to the Motion Picture Corporation of America name and their three top movies. Metromedia retained Goldwyn Entertainment's Landmark Theatre Group. The remaining Orion Pictures films released in 1998 and 1999 were originally shot in 1997 at the latest, with One Man's Hero (1999) being the last film released by Orion Pictures for 15 years.

MGM kept Orion Pictures intact as a corporation, mostly to avoid its home video distribution agreement with Warner Home Video and began distributing Orion Pictures films under the Orion Home Video label. MGM acquired the two thirds of the pre-1996 PolyGram Filmed Entertainment library (which included the Epic film library) from Seagram in 1999 for $250 million, increasing their library holdings to 4,000. The PolyGram libraries were purchased by its Orion Pictures subsidiary so as to avoid its 1990 home video distribution agreement with Warner Home Video. In March 1999, MGM bought out its distribution contract with Warner Home Video for $225 million, effectively ending the distribution problem.

=== 2013–present: Revival ===
Orion logo used from its revival in 2013 to July 19, 2022.

In 2013, Orion returned to television production (after its original television unit was shut down during its bankruptcy period) with a new syndicated court show, Paternity Court.

The Orion Pictures name, also as Orion Releasing, was extended in fourth quarter 2014 for smaller multi-platform video on demand and limited theatrical distribution. Its name was first seen again on September 10, 2014, in front of the trailer for The Town That Dreaded Sundown that was released in October. The label's first release was the Brazilian film Vestido pra Casar.

In September 2015, Entertainment One Films relaunched the Momentum Pictures banner with an announced deal with Orion Pictures to co-acquire and co-distribute films in the United States and Canada, and selected foreign markets, such as the United Kingdom (Momentum's country of origin). The initial films under the deal were The Wannabe, Fort Tilden and Balls Out. Other films released by Orion Pictures and Momentum Pictures include Pocket Listing and Diablo.

Starting in September 2016 with Burn Country, Orion Pictures and Samuel Goldwyn Films paired in acquiring several films.

Orion Television launched a second court show in the fall of 2017, Couples Court with the Cutlers, which features married couple Keith and Dana Cutler presiding over romantic and domestic disputes.

On September 6, 2017, MGM officially revitalized the Orion Pictures brand as a standalone, US theatrical marketing and distribution arm with the hiring of John Hegeman, who joined from Blumhouse Tilt (distributor of Orion's The Town That Dreaded Sundown and The Belko Experiment) and incidentally got his start at the original Orion in the 1980s. Hegeman would serve as president of the expanded label and report to Jonathan Glickman, president of MGM's motion picture group. Under his leadership, the "new" Orion will produce, market and distribute four to six modestly budgeted films a year across genres and platforms, and both wide and limited releases for targeted audiences. Its first release, the young adult romance drama Every Day, was released on February 23, 2018.

In May 2018, it was announced that Orion Classics would be revived as a multiplatform distribution label, with 8 to 10 films being released per year.

On February 5, 2019, MGM and Annapurna Pictures expanded their US joint distribution venture Mirror, rebranding it as United Artists Releasing. Beginning in April 2019, Orion Pictures' upcoming titles would be distributed through the UAR banner and Orion's theatrical distribution staff will move to UAR. The first Orion film to do so was the remake of Child's Play, which was released on June 21, 2019.

On August 20, 2020, it was announced that Orion would be relaunched again, with its focus shifting to films made by underrepresented filmmakers (including people of color, women, the LGBT community and people with disabilities) as part of the efforts to increase inclusivity in the film industry, both in front of and behind the camera, with the hiring of Alana Mayo as the president, replacing Hegeman by October. The first film released with this new focus was Anything's Possible (previously titled What If?), a coming-of-age drama directed by Billy Porter in his directorial debut. This effort continued in 2021 when they, along with Annapurna, acquired the US distribution rights to On the Count of Three two weeks after it premiered at the 2021 Sundance Film Festival.

On May 17, 2021, online shopping company Amazon entered negotiations to acquire MGM and even made a bid for about $9 billion, with the intention to own the studio's library, including Orion's films, to grow the Amazon Prime Video catalog. The negotiations were made with Anchorage Capital Kevin Ulrich. On May 26, 2021, it was officially announced that MGM would be acquired by Amazon for $8.45 billion. The merger was finalized on March 17, 2022.

On March 4, 2023, Amazon shut down UAR's operations and folded them into MGM, resulting in MGM becoming Orion's new domestic distributor, with Warner Bros. Pictures becoming the studio's new international distributor. In May 2023, Amazon Studios created Amazon MGM Studios Distribution, an international film and television distribution unit for both MGM and Amazon projects, which will include new projects from Orion. On September 17, 2023, American Fiction became the studio's first film to win the People's Choice Award at that year's Toronto International Film Festival.

== Film library ==
=== Notable films ===
During the 1980s and early 1990s, Orion's output included Woody Allen films, Hollywood blockbusters such as the first Terminator and the RoboCop films, comedies such as Throw Momma from the Train, Dirty Rotten Scoundrels, Caddyshack, Something Wild, UHF, and the Bill & Ted films, and Best Picture Academy Award winners Amadeus, Platoon, Dances with Wolves, and The Silence of the Lambs. Following Amazon’s purchase of MGM Holdings, Orion earned three consecutive Best Picture Academy Award nominations with Women Talking (2022), American Fiction (2023), and Nickel Boys (2024).

Following is a list of the major Academy Awards (Picture, Director, two Screenplay and four Acting awards) for which Orion films were nominated.

Film (Year)	Major Oscars	Nominee	Outcome
The Great Santini (1979)	Best Actor	Robert Duvall	Nominee
The Great Santini (1979)	Best Supporting Actor	Michael O'Keefe	Nominee
A Little Romance (1979)	Best Adapted Screenplay	Allan Burns	Nominee
Arthur (1981)	Best Actor	Dudley Moore	Nominee
Arthur (1981)	Best Supporting Actor	John Gielgud	Winner
Arthur (1981)	Best Original Screenplay	Steve Gordon	Nominee
Prince of the City (1981)	Best Adapted Screenplay	Jay Presson Allen and Sidney Lumet	Nominee
Amadeus (1984)	Best Picture	Saul Zaentz	Winner
Amadeus (1984)	Best Actor	F. Murray Abraham	Winner
Amadeus (1984)	Best Actor	Tom Hulce	Nominee
Amadeus (1984)	Best Director	Miloš Forman	Winner
Amadeus (1984)	Best Adapted Screenplay	Peter Shaffer	Winner
Broadway Danny Rose (1984)	Best Director	Woody Allen	Nominee
Broadway Danny Rose (1984)	Best Original Screenplay	Woody Allen	Nominee
The Purple Rose of Cairo (1985)	Best Original Screenplay	Woody Allen	Nominee
Platoon (1986)	Best Picture	Arnold Kopelson	Winner
Platoon (1986)	Best Director	Oliver Stone	Winner
Platoon (1986)	Best Original Screenplay	Oliver Stone	Nominee
Platoon (1986)	Best Supporting Actor	Tom Berenger	Nominee
Platoon (1986)	Best Supporting Actor	Willem Dafoe	Nominee
Hannah and Her Sisters (1986)	Best Picture	Robert Greenhut	Nominee
Hannah and Her Sisters (1986)	Best Director	Woody Allen	Nominee
Hannah and Her Sisters (1986)	Best Supporting Actor	Michael Caine	Winner
Hannah and Her Sisters (1986)	Best Supporting Actress	Dianne Wiest	Winner
Hannah and Her Sisters (1986)	Best Original Screenplay	Woody Allen	Winner
Hoosiers (1986)	Best Supporting Actor	Dennis Hopper	Nominee
Radio Days (1987)	Best Original Screenplay	Woody Allen	Nominee
Throw Momma from the Train (1987)	Best Supporting Actress	Anne Ramsey	Nominee
Bull Durham (1988)	Best Original Screenplay	Ron Shelton	Nominee
Mississippi Burning (1988)	Best Picture	Frederick Zollo and Robert F. Colesbury	Nominee
Mississippi Burning (1988)	Best Director	Alan Parker	Nominee
Mississippi Burning (1988)	Best Actor	Gene Hackman	Nominee
Mississippi Burning (1988)	Best Supporting Actress	Frances McDormand	Nominee
Married to the Mob (1988)	Best Supporting Actor	Dean Stockwell	Nominee
The Unbearable Lightness of Being (1988)	Best Adapted Screenplay	Jean-Claude Carrière and Philip Kaufman	Nominee
Crimes and Misdemeanors (1989)	Best Director	Woody Allen	Nominee
Crimes and Misdemeanors (1989)	Best Supporting Actor	Martin Landau	Nominee
Crimes and Misdemeanors (1989)	Best Original Screenplay	Woody Allen	Nominee
Alice (1990)	Best Original Screenplay	Woody Allen	Nominee
Dances with Wolves (1990)	Best Picture	Jim Wilson and Kevin Costner	Winner
Dances with Wolves (1990)	Best Director	Kevin Costner	Winner
Dances with Wolves (1990)	Best Actor	Kevin Costner	Nominee
Dances with Wolves (1990)	Best Supporting Actor	Graham Greene	Nominee
Dances with Wolves (1990)	Best Supporting Actress	Mary McDonnell	Nominee
Dances with Wolves (1990)	Best Adapted Screenplay	Michael Blake	Winner
The Silence of the Lambs (1991)	Best Picture	Edward Saxon, Kenneth Utt, and Ron Bozman	Winner
The Silence of the Lambs (1991)	Best Director	Jonathan Demme	Winner
The Silence of the Lambs (1991)	Best Actor	Anthony Hopkins	Winner
The Silence of the Lambs (1991)	Best Actress	Jodie Foster	Winner
The Silence of the Lambs (1991)	Best Adapted Screenplay	Ted Tally	Winner
Love Field (1992)	Best Actress	Michelle Pfeiffer	Nominee
Blue Sky (1994)	Best Actress	Jessica Lange	Winner
Ulee's Gold (1997)	Best Actor	Peter Fonda	Nominee
Women Talking (2022)	Best Picture	Dede Gardner, Jeremy Kleiner, and Frances McDormand	Nominee
Women Talking (2022)	Best Adapted Screenplay	Sarah Polley	Winner
American Fiction (2023)	Best Picture	Ben LeClair, Nikos Karamigios, Cord Jefferson, and Jermaine Johnson	Nominee
American Fiction (2023)	Best Adapted Screenplay	Cord Jefferson	Winner
American Fiction (2023)	Best Actor	Jeffrey Wright	Nominee
American Fiction (2023)	Best Supporting Actor	Sterling K. Brown	Nominee
Nickel Boys (2024)	Best Picture	Dede Gardner, Jeremy Kleiner, and Joslyn Barnes	Nominee
Nickel Boys (2024)	Best Adapted Screenplay	RaMell Ross and Joslyn Barnes	Nominee

=== Highest-grossing films ===
Highest-grossing films worldwide
Rank	Title	Year	Worldwide Gross
1	Dances with Wolves	1990	$424.2
2	The Silence of the Lambs	1991	$272.7
3	The Addams Family	1991	$191.5
4	First Blood	1982	$125.2
5	The Terminator	1984	$78.3
6	Throw Momma from the Train	1987	$57.2
7	RoboCop	1987	$53.4
8	Dirty Rotten Scoundrels	1988	$42.5
9	Bill & Ted's Excellent Adventure	1989	$40.5

=== Orion's library today ===
Almost all of Orion's post-1982 releases, as well as most of the AIP and Filmways backlogs and all of the television output originally produced and distributed by Orion Television, now bear the MGM name. However, in most cases, the 1980s Orion logo has been retained or added, in the case of the Filmways and AIP libraries.

Most ancillary rights to Orion's back catalog from the 1978–1982 joint venture period remain with Warner Bros., including such films as 10 (1979), Caddyshack (1980), Arthur (1981), Excalibur (1981), and Prince of the City (1981). Some post-1982 films originally released by Orion—Lionheart (1987), The Unbearable Lightness of Being (1988), and Amadeus (1984) (the latter two being Saul Zaentz productions)—are currently distributed by Warner Bros. as well. HBO also owns video distribution rights to Three Amigos (1986), as they co-produced the film and owns pay-TV rights. However, MGM owns all other rights and the film's copyright. The Wanderers is owned by the film's producers; however, the copyright is held by MGM/Orion. Orion also retains a controlling interest in The Cotton Club, although major rights are now with Lionsgate, which owns the library of presenting studio Zoetrope Corporation.

Woody Allen's films A Midsummer Night's Sex Comedy (1982) and Zelig (1983) are the only Orion films from the original joint venture period now owned by MGM, as the rights for them remained with Allen, who sold them to MGM in 2000. Orion releases produced by the Hemdale Film Corporation and Nelson Entertainment are included in MGM's library as well, and are incorporated into the Orion library. MGM did not acquire the Hemdale films (which include The Terminator, Hoosiers, and Platoon) or the Nelson films (including the Bill & Ted films) until MGM bought the pre-1996 library of PolyGram Filmed Entertainment (the "Epic library"), which included both companies' libraries, although the television and digital rights to certain Nelson films are now held by Paramount Television (the result of a pre-existing deal Nelson had with Viacom), with television syndication handled on behalf of Paramount Television by Trifecta Entertainment & Media.

Many of the film and television holdings of The Samuel Goldwyn Company have now also been incorporated into the Orion library (with ownership currently held by MGM), and the copyright on some of this material is held by Orion, except The New Adventures of Flipper now carries the MGM Television Entertainment copyright.

MGM still holds distribution rights to the 1980s revival of Hollywood Squares and High Rollers the company produced, as well as the remnants of the Heatter-Quigley library that was not erased, including all remaining episodes of the original Squares; they do not own the rights to the format, which is currently owned by CBS Television Distribution, successor-in-interest to King World, who purchased the format rights in 1991 and produced another syndicated revival from 1998 to 2004.

Orion distributed the first Rambo film, First Blood (1982). That film, like the rest of the Rambo franchise, is now owned by StudioCanal as a result of purchasing the library of its co-distributor, Carolco Pictures.
