= Tom Ajamie =

American lawyer (born 1960)

- Born: Thomas R. Ajamie; June 25, 1960 (age 66)
- Education: Arizona State University; Notre Dame Law School
- Occupation: Lawyer
- Title: Managing partner and founder of Ajamie LLP
- Board member of: Houston Grand Opera
- Website: www.ajamie.com/lawyers/thomas-r-ajamie/

Thomas Ajamie (born June 25, 1960) is an American lawyer and the founder of the law firm Ajamie LLP.

== Early life and education ==
Ajamie's paternal grandfather immigrated to the U.S. from Lebanon.

He grew up in Scottsdale, Arizona, where his father started and ran a pizza delivery business.

Ajamie studied political science and foreign languages at Arizona State University and in his junior year was the student body President. For his senior year Ajame then spent the span studying at the University of Louvain in Belgium. He subsequently attended the University of Notre Dame for law school.

== Professional history ==
Ajamie began his legal career as a trial lawyer at the law firm Baker Botts. During his tenure there, he successfully defended the world's second largest funeral and cemetery services company, Loewen Group against a $4 billion hostile takeover bid by that industry's largest company, SCI. In 1997, he left Baker Botts and founded the firm which is now known as Ajamie LLP.

== Ajamie LLP ==
In 2001, a New York Stock Exchange panel levied a $429 million fine, the largest in history at the time, against PaineWebber broker Enrique Perusquia on behalf of Ajamie's clients.

In 2006, a New York Stock Exchange arbitration panel returned a $14.5 million penalty, the third largest ever at the time, against Prudential Equity Group on behalf of his clients.

In 2010, he won the largest civil RICO jury verdict in United States history on behalf of his client ADT Security Services.

Ajamie served as outside counsel for the Houston Super Bowl Host Committee. He and his firm handled all compliance issues for nearly two years leading up to Super Bowl LI in 2017

In 2016, amfAR’s board retained Ajamie to investigate a suspicious financial transaction involving Harvey Weinstein. Weinstein hired lawyer David Boies and law firm Gibson, Dunn & Crutcher, as well as Israeli firm Black Cube to block the investigation.

After members of the amfAR board had shared the report with the New York attorney general and members of the press, Ajamie was contacted by New York Times writers Jodi Kantor and Megan Twohey. In October 2017, Twohey and Kantor published their sexual misconduct piece on Weinstein. Ajamie's Weinstein investigation is also featured in their New York Times bestseller She Said: Breaking the Sexual Harassment Story That Helped Ignite a Movement.

In 2018 Ajamie appeared in the PBS Frontline film Weinstein to relate the story of his fateful interaction with the then soon to be felled film mogul in a Park City, Utah hotel during the Sundance Film Festival. Also in the 2024 BBC/CBC podcast series The Six Billion Dollar Gold Scam in the episode End of the Bonanza he offers his views on the possible expiration of the supposedly dead (but by some sources reported alive), Filipino geologist Michael de Guzman, who is/was a central figure in the Bre-X scandal in the aftermath of which Ajame represented some of the concern's investors in Indonesia.

In 2020, Ajamie and his law firm settled for $79 million a federal court class action lawsuit against Wells Fargo & Company on behalf of its former financial advisors who were forced to forfeit their deferred compensation when they left the company.

In 2024 Ajame LLP as co-counsel obtained a $134 million dollar settlement from AT&T in favor of the corporations minority investors. In 2026 Ajame LLP co-filed a lawsuit on behalf of farmers Weskan Grain and CXR in Kansas and Oklahoma alleging damages from anti-truat monopolistic practices by Union Pacific and Kansas & Oklahoma Railroad.

== Philanthropy ==
Ajamie started the Ajame scholarship fund in 2002 at his alma mater, Arizona State University, for students who support diversity initiatives. The Ajamie Scholarship Fund awards scholarships to multiple qualifying students per semester. As of 2026 more than a score have been sponsored by the fund.

Further Ajame philanthropically supports Hospice of the Valley in his native Arizona, the Elton John Aids Foundation, the Robin Hood Foundation, the MoMA, and the Sundance Film Festival and he is a board member of the Houston Grand Opera.

In the course of his active philanthropic efforts, Ajamie regularly attends charitable events both international and domestic, often accompanied by well-known figures such as model Carol Alt. He has also served on the event committee for the Art de Vivre award bestowed by L'Alliance New York (French Institute Alliance Française - FIAF).

== Book ==
In 2010, Ajamie and Bruce Kelly wrote the book Financial Serial Killers: Inside the World of Wall Street Money Hustlers, Swindlers, and Con Men. The second edition of Financial Serial Killers was released in paperback in 2014.

Publishers Weekly in reviewing the book opined ..."Ajamie, a top securities lawyer, and Kelly, news editor for Investment News, team up to recount true tales of financial frauds throughout history, which make for addictive if depressing reading. Ajamie's expertise in commercial litigation gives the reader an inside look at the complex strategies financial advisers, insurance agents, and even family members employ to fleece hapless individuals, focusing on the false emotional bonds con artists create with their victims in order to take advantage of them".

In 2017 Ajamie spoke at the Chautauqua Institution in Chautauqua, New York in conjunction with the book.

== Awards and honors ==
- Top 50 Litigation Trailblazers (The National Law Journal)
- Plaintiffs’ Lawyers Trailblazers (The National Law Journal)
- Litigation Star–Commercial (Benchmark Litigation, published by Euromoney Institutional Investor)
- Named to Best Lawyers since 2014
- Named a 2024 Leading lawyer in Commercial Litigation by Chambers & Partners
