= Buyers club =

Club organized to pool members' collective buying power

A buyers club or buying club is a club organized to pool members' collective buying power, enabling them to make purchases at lower prices than are generally available, or to purchase goods that might be difficult to obtain independently.

Some key examples of buyers clubs include medical purchases of rare medications for treating HIV or hepatitis C sooner, at reduced cost for patients.

== Community bulk purchases ==
In many parts of the United States, Canada, and Europe, families and individuals combine their purchasing power to buy items, typically bulk-type food, in a volume that generates a discounted price from the seller. The seller saves by having only one purchase order to manage and, possibly, less packaging and delivery to deal with. The buyers benefit from a lower per-unit cost and, incidentally, from an increased sense of community and sharing. Bulk-food sellers often provide tools so their customers can set up community buyers' clubs.

The trend for buyers' clubs, or local co-ops, accelerated starting in the 1970s. However, these groups are organic in structure, locally governed, and can come into being and go out of existence without much publicity, so there is no precise figure for how many buyers' clubs of this sort exist or have existed.

In the United Kingdom, the "Smarterbuys" scheme, which helps provide affordable loans to disadvantaged people so that they can buy essential goods, won the government's Buy Better Together Challenge prize in 2012. The Buy Better Together Challenge was launched by the Department for Business, Innovation and Skills and Co-operatives UK in December 2011 to encourage groups of consumers to work together to negotiate discounted rates for buying goods and services in bulk. The challenge received 110 entries and seven finalists were selected. Fair Food Carlisle was awarded the runner-up prize for a scheme which uses buying groups to provide workplaces with a weekly supply of food from local businesses.

== AIDS epidemic ==
In the early days of the HIV/AIDS epidemic, AIDS buyers clubs became important as a means of obtaining medications not yet approved by the FDA that members thought might be useful in treating HIV and opportunistic infections. The buyers clubs provided medical care seen to many as necessary for survival. The first and largest of these was the People With AIDS Health Group (PWA Health Group), founded in 1986 by Thomas Hannan, Joseph Sonnabend, and Michael Callen. AIDS buyers clubs distributed such unapproved drugs as ribavirin, dextran sulfate, and DNCB (dinitrochlorobenzene), as well as cheaper pirated versions of zidovudine (AZT), which was the first antiretroviral drug that was FDA-approved for the treatment of HIV and AIDS in 1987. AIDS buyers clubs also distributed information about the disease and drug developments, and became an important source of AIDS treatment education and advocacy. An example of an AIDS buyers club was drawn to wider prominence with the 2013 film release Dallas Buyers Club.

The clubs were technically independent from one another but would aid each other in circulation of product or inform each other on sources to obtain products. The Ft. Lauderdale Principles was an ethical code established by the Ft. Lauderdale buyers club, including a requirement to provide products at the “lowest possible cost”. Most clubs subscribed to this ethical code, making the primary goal of these buyers clubs not to be profit, but rather providing potentially life-saving services to their members.

Buyers clubs were controversial among medical professionals, due to the dissemination of drugs that did not have FDA approval (but were tested beforehand for purity and analysis). Many with HIV/AIDS saw the resources provided by buyers clubs as the only option against a fatal disease during a time of federal inactivity. Ron Woodroof, founder of the Dallas buyers club, was once quoted as saying, “Dammit … I don’t see how anything can be more toxic than HIV itself. I have taken chances that have almost killed me and I will keep on taking them. I have nothing to lose."

== Hepatitis C ==
In response to the high price of modern direct-acting antiviral (DAA) treatments for hepatitis C, the FixHepC buyers club was set up by James Freeman and his father John Freeman in Australia in 2015 in order to help individual patients obtain legal access to generic versions of sofosbuvir, daclatasvir, and ledipasvir. At EASL International Liver Congress, Dr. Freeman presented data showing how generic versions are as effective as branded products.

== Scams ==
In the United States, the Federal Trade Commission (FTC) found that fraudulent or misleading buyers clubs were one of the top three types of consumer fraud in 2011, affecting about 0.6% of the US population every year.

These memberships are typically sold in the course of selling another product, either with a free trial membership being a condition of making the purchase at the offered price or with a free trial membership being included as a "thank you" gift along with the initial purchase. The customer may not understand what was purchased or may believe that they have not authorized payment for the membership, and yet the credit card used for the initial purchase is billed for the buyer's club membership at the end of the free trial. According to Iowa Attorney General Tom Miller, "Consumers often tell us they don't recall ever having spoken to the companies, and they don't understand how they can be charged when they have not given the company their credit card number."

Sometimes, a wide variety of products are promised at a discount, and then once the fee is paid the products are unavailable or not as advertised. This is particularly true for travel-related buying clubs.
