= Arthur B. Krim =

American entertainment industry businessman (1910–1994)

Arthur Krim
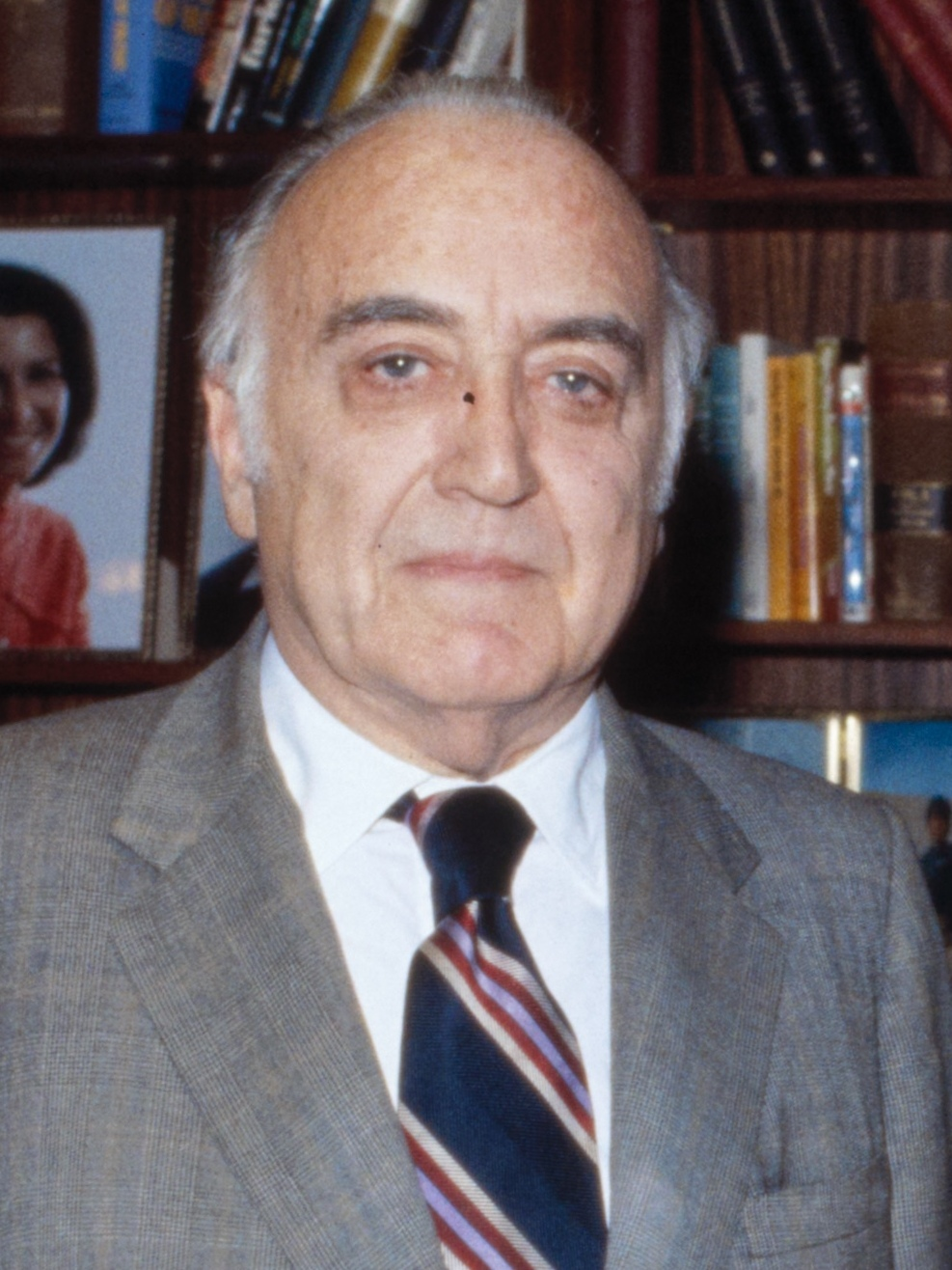
- Krim in 1978
- Born: Arthur Brian Krim; April 4, 1910; New York City, New York, U.S.
- Died: September 21, 1994 (aged 84); New York City, New York, U.S.
- Education: Columbia University (BA, JD)
- Political party: Democratic
- Spouse: Mathilde Galland

Arthur B. Krim (April 4, 1910 – September 21, 1994) was an American entertainment lawyer, the former finance chairman for the U.S. Democratic Party, an adviser to President Lyndon Johnson, and the former chairman of Eagle-Lion Films (1945–1950), United Artists (1950–1978), and Orion Pictures (1978–1994). His more than four decades as a movie studio head is one of the longest in Hollywood history.

== Biography ==
Born to a Jewish family in New York City, he received his B.A. from Columbia University in 1930 and graduated from Columbia Law School two years later.

Krim was a partner at the firm of Phillips Nizer Benjamin Krim & Ballon. He worked as an entertainment lawyer for clients such as Clifford Odets and John Garfield.

He served in the U.S. Army Service Forces in the Pacific Theatre of Operations of World War II where he rose to the rank of lieutenant colonel.

== Film ==
In 1946, Krim and his partner Robert Benjamin managed the American portion of Eagle-Lion Films where they sought top talent to produce their films.

When Krim and Benjamin took over United Artists in 1951, stockholders gave them three years to turn a profit; they did it in six months. Krim remained with UA until 1978 when he created Orion Pictures.

== Democratic Party ==
Krim became an influential Democrat, head of the Democratic Party Financing Committee and advised Presidents John F. Kennedy, Lyndon B. Johnson and Jimmy Carter.

== Personal life ==
He was married to Mathilde Krim. He died in New York City in 1994 at aged 84.

Upon Nelson Mandela's release and subsequent freedom tour in 1990, Krim hosted a $1,000-per-person cocktail party at his East Side townhouse where attendees hoped to greet the newly freed Mandela.
