= Thomas Hannan (activist) =

American opera singer and HIV/AIDS activist

Thomas Hannan (1950 – 27 March 1994) was an American opera singer and HIV/AIDS activist.

Before the AIDS crisis, Hannan was pursuing a career in Europe as an opera singer, but returned to New York City when the crisis hit.

In 1986, he founded the PWA Health Group with Joseph Sonnabend and Michael Callen. This nonprofit organization was the first and largest formally recognised AIDS buyers' club, which aimed to widen access to promising AIDS therapies not yet approved by the FDA; the PWA Health Group went on to become an important source of AIDS treatment education and advocacy. In 2000, DAAIR, Direct Aids Alternative Information Resources, merged with the PWA Health Group, but the organizations have since been superseded by the New York Buyers' Club.

Hannan also helped to establish the nonprofit Community Research Initiative (CRI, later renamed CRIA, then ACRIA) in New York in 1987, becoming the organization's administrative director. One of CRI's early achievements was a trial that contributed to the approval of inhaled pentamidine for preventing Pneumocystis pneumonia, a common AIDS-related infection.
