= Robert Benjamin =

American lawyer (1909–1979)

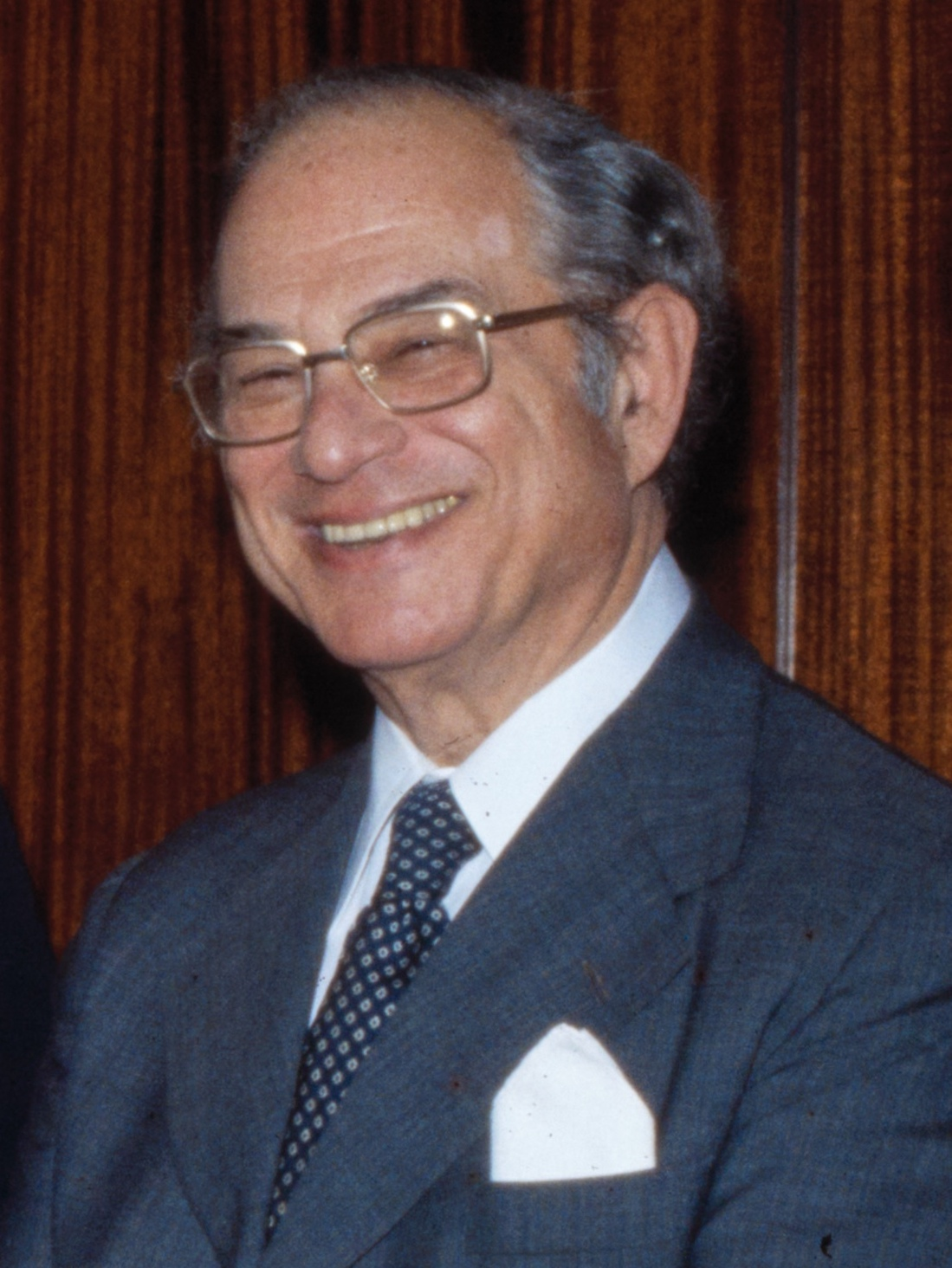
Benjamin in 1978

Robert Saul Benjamin (1909 – October 22, 1979) was a founding partner of the movie-litigation firm Phillips, Nizer, Benjamin, Krim & Ballon, a former co‐chairman of United Artists, and a founding member of Orion Pictures.

== Biography ==
Robert Saul Benjamin was born to a Jewish family.

== Career ==
Benjamin, along with his longtime friend and partner Arthur B. Krim, took over United Artists in 1951. The deal that they struck with then-owners Charlie Chaplin and Mary Pickford was that if the company showed a profit in any one of the first three years of their management, the two would be able to purchase a 50% share of the company for one dollar.

The Krim-Benjamin team quickly showed a profit, and they bought out Chaplin and Pickford to own the company outright in 1955. In 1957, they took the company public.

In 1975 Benjamin was a senior adviser to the United States delegation to the United Nations.

== Awards ==
In 1979, Robert Benjamin won the Jean Hersholt Humanitarian award posthumously. His wife Jean accepted the award on his behalf.

== Personal life ==
Robert Benjamin married Jean Kortright. They had two kids, Jonathan and Margret.
