= Gabelmann =

Gabelmann is a surname. Notable people with the surname include:

- Colin Gabelmann (born 1944), former politician in British Columbia
- Sylvia Gabelmann (born 1958), German politician
