= AmfAR =

Nonprofit AIDS research organization

The Foundation for AIDS Research
- Abbreviation: amfAR
- Formation: September 1985; 41 years ago
- Merger of: AIDS Medical Foundation; National AIDS Research Foundation
- Tax ID no.: 13-3163817
- Legal status: Research charity
- Purpose: AIDS Research
- Headquarters: New York, New York
- Coordinates: 40.704772°N 74.006174°W
- Region served: Worldwide
- Chief Executive Officer: Kyle Clifford
- Board of directors: T. Ryan Greenawalt and Kevin McClatchy (Board Co-Chairs); Jeffrey Schoenfeld (Treasurer); Robert L. Traynham II, PhD (Secretary)
- Main organ: Board of Trustees
- Website: www.amfar.org

The Foundation for AIDS Research (amfAR), known until 2005 as The American Foundation for AIDS Research, is an international nonprofit organization dedicated to the support of AIDS research, HIV prevention, treatment education, and the advocacy of AIDS-related public policy.

amfAR is a tax-exempt corporation under Internal Revenue Code section 501(c)(3) and operates as an independent nonprofit with worldwide initiatives. amfAR was formed in September 1985 by actress Elizabeth Taylor, researcher Mathilde Krim, physicians Michael S. Gottlieb and Joseph Sonnabend, and activist Michael Callen. The organization was created when Taylor and Gottlieb's California-based National AIDS Research Foundation, which sought to actively engage in HIV-related drug development, merged with Krim's New York-based AIDS Medical Foundation (AMF), which sought to lessen the stigma surrounding HIV/AIDS diagnoses, as well as to increase funding to the cause. What resulted was a foundation that prioritized both research and development as well as policy influence. This foundation was one of the first of its kind to embody both aspects of healthcare.

amfAR has three headquarters, located in New York City; Washington, D.C.; and Bangkok, Thailand. amfAR spurs research and development through providing grants to organizations and researchers, and fellowships to early-career scientists through the Mathilde Krim Fellowships in Basic Biomedical Research. amfAR has provided over 3,800 grants to research teams across the world and has invested over $900 million to research aiming to effectively treat HIV and AIDS-related illness, as well as to cure HIV and other global health threats. amfAR's funds historically have gone to funding research, and as a result have helped pioneer community-based clinical research trials in the 1980s, as well as the involvement of AIDS patients in the drug approval process (see also: Denver Principles). Changes in leadership have marked changes in focus, resulting in shifts from public health outreach (needle exchange program pushes) to public education (the amfAR AIDS Handbook) to international research and outreach.

amfAR has embarked on various national and international campaigns to spur AIDS/HIV research, create a dialogue and decrease stigma surrounding the disease. Through TREAT Asia and GMT, amfAR took international roots and began funding research and outreach on all inhabited continents. National initiatives have included the Countdown to a Cure for AIDS. The amfAR Institute for HIV Cure Research and amfAR Research Consortium on HIV Eradication (ARCHE) were both created to aid this countdown, both to help fund research as well as provide a facility at which those researcher can work. To supplement the funding of these initiatives, amfAR is funded through sources like stock donations and their annual galas, which represent the majority of their source of funding.

After Kenneth Cole stepped down as chairman, he was replaced by William H. Roedy. The CEO Kevin Robert Frost joined amfAR in 1994 and became CEO in 2004. Frost leads eight members of the Management Team, 25 Board of Trustees members and over 100 advisors to both their scientific and political platforms.

CharityWatch gives the Foundation for AIDS Research an "A−" grade.

Charity Navigator rates amfAR a four-star charity.

== History ==
=== Origins ===
In the early 1980s, a group of researchers and scientists including Mathilde Krim, Ph.D., then a researcher at New York's Memorial Sloan Kettering Cancer Center, formed an informal study group to investigate the condition that came to be known as AIDS. In 1983, Krim, Joseph Sonnabend, Michael Callen, and several others launched the New York-based AIDS Medical Foundation. In Los Angeles, Michael S. Gottlieb and amfAR Founding National Chairman Elizabeth Taylor spearheaded the creation of the National AIDS Research Foundation with a $250,000 contribution from Rock Hudson shortly before his AIDS related death in October 1985. The two organizations merged in September 1985 to become "American Foundation for AIDS Research" (amfAR).

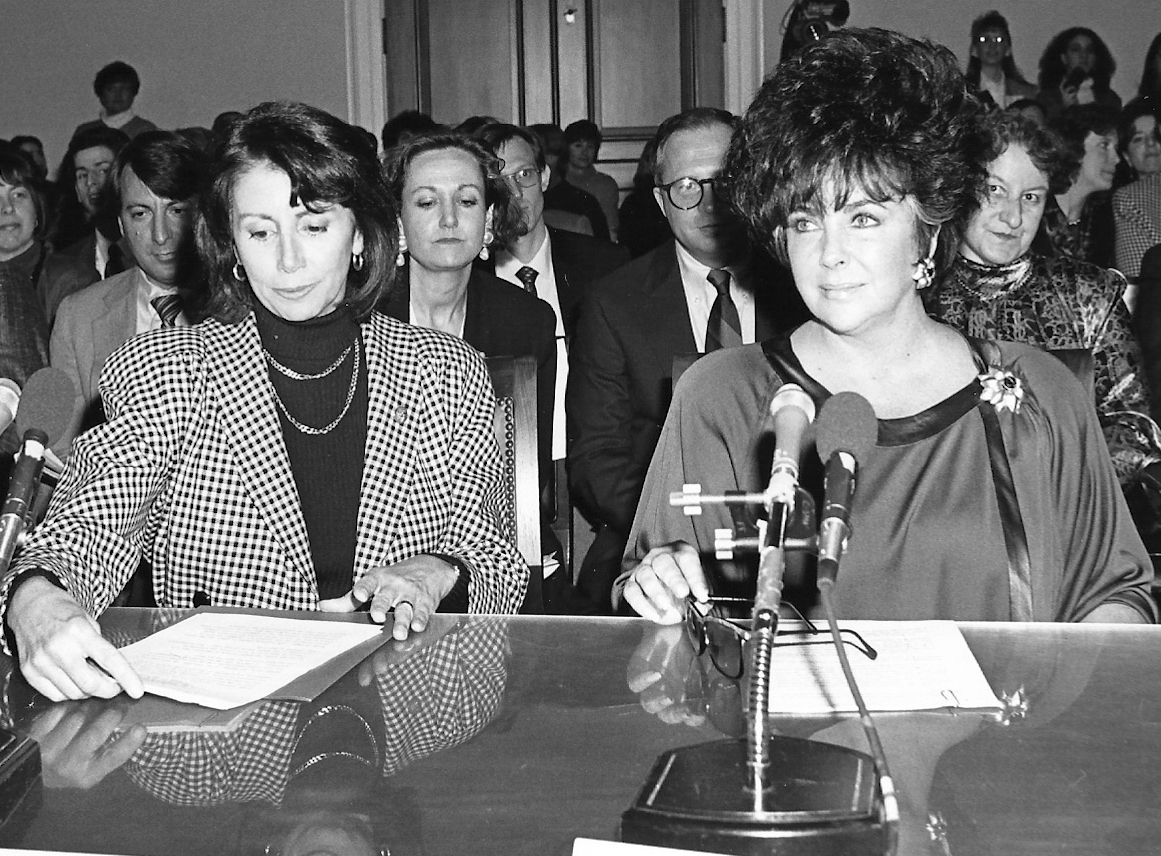
Nancy Pelosi and Elizabeth Taylor Testifying Before the House Budget Committee on HIV-AIDS Funding

=== Elizabeth Taylor's critical role ===
As founding national chairman of amfAR, Elizabeth Taylor became the organization's principal spokesperson and titular head. She made countless public appearances on the foundation's behalf and secured multiple $1 million gifts. As a star and public figure, her involvement attracted enormous media attention to amfAR, and she made trips to Thailand, Japan, and Europe on the foundation's behalf.

In 1987, she testified before Congress to plead for a funding increase for emergency AIDS care in areas hardest hit by the epidemic. Her testimony helped draw media attention, which built public support for the Comprehensive AIDS Resources Emergency (CARE) Act. She then persuaded President Ronald Reagan to acknowledge the disease for the first time in a speech in 1987. Three years later, she once again testified before Congress with Jeanne White, mother of Ryan White. The pair urged Congress to pass the CARE Act of 1990. The CARE Act, named for White, was passed by Congress on August 18, 1990. Funds were slow to be allocated so Elizabeth went back to Congress to fight for the promised funding. The CARE act was the largest federally funded program for people living with HIV/AIDS. In 2009, President Barack Obama signed the fourth extension of the act. The program provides care for 500,00 people a year and funds over 2,000 organizations.

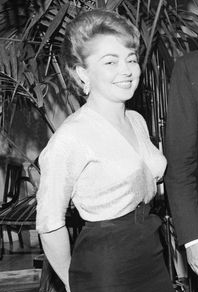
Mathilde Krim in 1962, the year she departed Cornell Medical College

=== Leadership under Krim ===
Krim's achievements during her time as a leader of amfAR involved increased public education and direct political action. Krim spearheaded the publishing of amfAR's first HIV/AIDS Treatment Directory, which provides medical professionals updated information on the treatment of HIV/AIDS, as well as clinical trials that People With AIDS (PWAs) can participate in. The publishing of this directory continued for 11 volumes until the year 2001. Following the increased involvement of AIDS activists and patients with the drug approval process, Krim and Taylor testified before the National Institute of Health and Congress on the importance of clinical trials within community settings. These testimony and lobbying efforts by Krim and Taylor led to the first Adult AIDS Clinical Trials Group, which allowed people with AIDS and HIV to actively take part in the testing needed to approve AIDS drugs. Krim further shaped the structure of amfAR fellowships, as she impelled the first grant to Peter Piot for his landmark study on female-to-male AIDS transmission in Kenya.

"They felt that this was a disease that resulted from a sleazy lifestyle, drugs or kinky sex—that certain people had learned their lesson and it served them right," Krim told The New York Times Magazine in 1988. "That was the attitude, even on the part of respectable foundations that are supposed to be concerned about human welfare."

One of Krim's final projects was her push for needle exchange programs in the face of mass stigma toward IV-drug users. Amid the 1980s' "war on drugs", Krim's thoughts on sterile needle exchange is reflected in a quote, saying, "It was a brilliant idea. It would work—the drug users would use the clean needles—and it would be inexpensive." Krim worked with the Outside In needle exchange program in Portland, Oregon, in 1989, and funded trials of needle exchange programs in Tacoma, Washington, between 1989–1991. amfAR used the results of these studies, as well as a study in New Haven, Connecticut, to compile a report with the National Academy of Science which concluded that syringe exchange programs were safe and effective. Before stepping down, Krim saw the international surge of amfAR, with the creation of initiatives such as TREAT Asia, and in 2004 the TREAT Asia HIV Observational Database (the only HIV database in Asia).

In 2005, Krim stepped down as founding chair. According to amfAR, she served as CEO from 1990 through 2004, and is described as the "heart and soul" of the organization. Charles Kaiser described Krim as "determined to prevent America from using AIDS to stigmatize homosexuals" in his book The Gay Metropolis: The Landmark History of Gay Life in America. She was widely viewed as someone who fought on the front lines against prejudices against many people with AIDS. Apart from aiding research for life saving drugs, Krim was equally a proponent of reshaping public opinion, as noted by The New York Times' tributes to her and those who interacted with her.

=== amfAR after Krim ===
The year after Krim stepped down in 2004, the CDC reported that 1,000,000 Americans were living with HIV/AIDS. In an effort to reduce the stigma surrounding HIV/AIDS, amfAR's new chairman Kenneth Cole led amfAR to partner with Viacom Inc. and the Kaiser Family Foundation to launch an initiative called KNOW HIV/AIDS. This program funded an AIDS awareness campaign titled, "We All Have AIDS", which marked a more controversial tone in amfAR's new public strategy. In line with the launching of program initiatives, amfAR under Cole launched the TREAT Asia pediatric network and the MSM initiative, which was a global effort to help educate, treat and prevent HIV/AIDS in men who have sex with men.

In honor of its founding chair, amfAR launched the Mathilde Krim Fellowship in Basic Biomedical Research in 2008. The goal of this fellowship is to spur young and independent research groups who are actively searching for HIV/AIDS medical advancements. This grant has spurred discoveries such as the first recorded birth of new HIV virus particles by Dr. Nolwenn Jouvenet, as well as other developments at the pinnacle of HIV research. Other recipients of the Mathilde Krim Fellowship such as Bing Chen and Rosa Cardoso have made discoveries that have been central to the modern understanding of the HIV virus.

After Cole stepped down as chairman due to a fraud investigation surrounding money diversion, he was replaced by William H. Roedy. The current CEO Kevin Robert Frost joined amfAR in 1994 and became CEO in 2004. The CEO leads 8 members of the Management Team, 25 Board of Trustees members and over 100 advisors to both their scientific and political platforms.

== Headquarters and facilities ==
amfAR's Sheldon W. Andelson Public Policy Office is located in Washington, D.C., and is where many Rosenfield public policy fellows and employees work, as well as its management team of CEO and Board of Trustees. amfAR's original headquarters as well as their largest operations facilities is in New York City.

=== amfAR Institute for HIV Cure Research ===
In 2015 amfAR announced a collaboration with the University of California, San Francisco Medical School to create their first Institute for HIV Cure Research. This facility works to foster research and was founded with the goal of finding a cure to AIDS by the year 2020. The leaders of the institute are Paul Volberding, MD who is the head of the UCSF AIDS Research Institute; Satish Pillai, PhD who part of the Blood Systems Institute as well as Warner Greene, MD, PhD, who helps direct the program. To remark on the progress that the institute had been making since its foundation, Volberding told CBS News in 2016:

To see the pace from the days that we could do very little other than watch our patients die to finding the first treatments and then working hard to make those treatments better to where we are now has been remarkable. We have a lot of different options of three or four drug combinations put together in a single pill that a person takes once a day. It's remarkably easier than it used to be.

=== Bangkok, Thailand headquarters ===
amfAR established its first international headquarters in Klongtoey, Bangkok, Thailand, in 2001 to accompany its TREAT Asia network. The headquarters establishes closer contact to its 21 adult and 20 pediatric clinics in 12 countries across East Asia. The headquarters is internationally run as well, and works to streamline the logistics of projects in TREAT Asia. Former Chairman Kenneth Cole announced that the decision to move headquarters to Thailand was due to the ability to use the government's generous resources that have been committed to treating the crisis, and have effectively reduced the HIV prevalence in the country to under 1.1% due to quick mobilization and dedicated work.

== Initiatives and campaigns ==
=== National initiatives ===
==== Countdown to a Cure for AIDS ====
amfAR had long intended to find a scientific cure to AIDS by the year 2020, and it created the Countdown to a Cure for AIDS in February 2014 as a way of speeding up this process. The "Countdown" is an investment initiative that intends to give $100 million to scientists working to find a cure. Most grants are given through applications at the University of California, San Francisco. By the year 2017, amfAR had granted $42 million to researchers, and it gave over $3.5 million in grants to six research teams under the amfAR Research Consortium on HIV Eradication (ARCHE), and later $1.2 million to AIDS innovators. By 2016, the Countdown, along with ARCHE had granted money to 139 principal investigators and key personnel across 16 states and 9 countries.

The amfAR Institute for HIV Cure Research at the University of California, San Francisco began in 2015 as the central facility to achieve their Countdown to a Cure for AIDS by 2020. It began from a $20 million grant to UCSF. Many researchers who receive fellowships and grants from amfAR and ARCHE work at the new facilities at UCSF. Under the Countdown to a Cure for AIDS, amfAR hosts an annual HIV Cure Summit, which aims to hear from voices in the research community on breakthroughs, as well as discuss discoveries that have motivated AIDS research, such as the breakthrough with the Berlin patient, who spurred the countdown in the first place. In November 2020, amfAR signed an agreement with CytoDyn Inc. to explore the potential of its CCR-5 antagonist Vyrologix (Leronlimab) to mediate a functional HIV cure. According to Kevin Robert Frost, Chief Executive Officer at amfAR, "demonstrating that Leronlimab can functionally phenocopy CCR5 deficiency and replicate the London and Berlin patients would be a major advancement."

=== Global initiatives ===
==== TREAT Asia ====
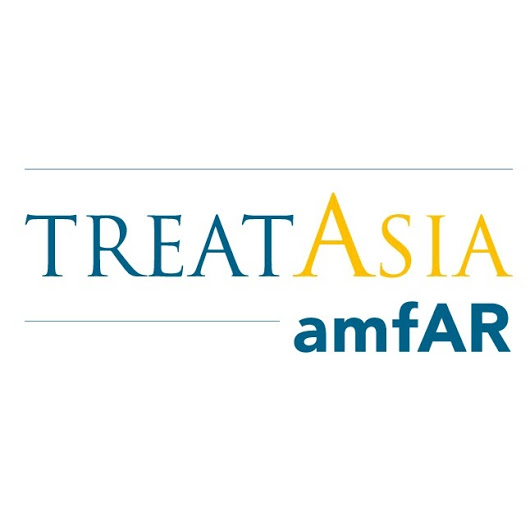

The Therapeutics Research, Education and AIDS Training (TREAT) in Asia was founded in 2001 under the leadership of Mathilde Krim. The initiative aimed to create communication networks among Asian countries who are aiming to treat HIV, using Thailand as a model and a central headquarters for the operation. TREAT Asia is directed by Annette Sohn of the University of California San Francisco, who is a principal investigator alongside Matthew Law of the Kirby Institute at the University of South Wales. The two lead a team of 18 scientists to perform research in the area on topics such as mental healthcare access of people with HIV/AIDS in Asian countries and the effect of new drugs on children with HIV.

The TREAT Asia member countries are all partners of the US National Institutes of Health's International Epidemiological Databases to Evaluate AIDS (IeDEA) global cohort consortium. The countries include:

- Australia
- Cambodia
- China and Hong Kong SAR
- India
- Indonesia
- Japan
- Malaysia
- New Zealand
- Philippines
- Singapore
- South Korea
- Taiwan
- Thailand
- Vietnam

There are over 60 research facilities, mostly hospitals and healthcare providers, in these countries that communicate with amfAR's headquarters in Thailand. The foundation has said that they service around 84,000 people of all ages who are affected with HIV and AIDS who otherwise were not aided before the program began.

==== The GMT Initiative ====
The GMT initiative is dedicated to providing HIV/AIDS assistance to men who have sex with men (MSM) and transgender people (which they term as the collective 'gay men and transgender (GMT)'). Unlike TREAT Asia, the GMT Initiative is truly global, with recent work in regarding their mentoring model in Paraguay, Thailand, Tajikistan and Kenya and Ukraine. The GMT Initiative further aims to spur outreach to low-income individuals by providing the amfAR HIV Scholars Program with the Center for LGBT Health Research at the University of Pittsburgh. Scholarship recipients from 2015 include individuals from South Africa, Pakistan and Belize.

The GMT Initiative aims to provide mentorship training to MSM and transgender individuals in countries with low access to AIDS support. It created a mentoring model that empowers 'GMT' to connect with younger individuals with HIV/AIDS in spite of a potential homophobic and stigmatized environment in the low and middle income countries that they service.

== Funding ==
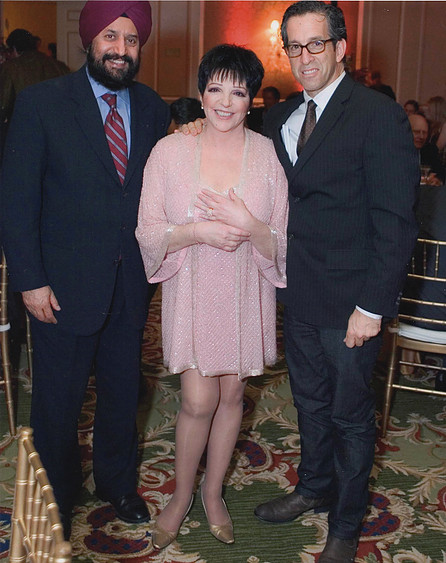
Liza Minnelli with Kenneth Cole at annual amfAR Gala in 2006

As a 501(c)(3), amfAR files an annual 990 Form to the IRS, which is publicly accessible.

=== Worldwide amfAR galas ===
amfAR's largest source of revenue comes from its fundraising events, large portions of that money comes from one of its annual charity event held at the Hôtel du Cap-Eden-Roc in Antibes, France, titled "amfAR's Annual Cinema Against AIDS". The gala aims to raise money through auctioning items, as well as selling a limited number of tickets. The idea originated with Taylor, who knew the power of these international, high profile events from her career as an actress. Since the first amfAR gala, the charity has raised over $210 million to support AIDS research causes. The most recent gala held in Cannes raised around $20 million at its 2016 gala, which is a marked decrease from the over $25 million it raised in the same 2016 and 2017 events. It was speculated that this decrease in funding was due to both the absence of its largest donor Harvey Weinstein, as well as the scandal surrounding the ousting of Kenneth Cole.

Celebrities frequently donate items to be auctioned off for the foundation, and past donors have included Uma Thurman, Karlie Kloss and Milla Jovovich, among others. The 25th annual gala embraced the #MeToo movement, and was chaired by 25 prominent women on stage and screen, namely: Alessandra Ambrosio, Poppy Delevigne, Linda Evangelista, Sylvia Fendi, Aileen Getty, Kate Hudson, Scarlett Johansson, Milla Jovovich, Heidi Klum, Daphna Krim (daughter of Mathilde Krim), Karolina Kurkova, Sienna Miller, Angela Missoni, Mary Parent, Katy Perry, Natasha Poly, Aishwarya Rai, Vanessa Redgrave, Joely Richardson, Carine Roitfeld, Caroline Scheufele, Irina Shayk, Lara Stone, Donatella Versace, and Michelle Yeoh. Past items auctioned have included numerous photographs by Andy Warhol, Annie Leibovitz portrait sessions, stays in fashion moguls and celebrity houses and 53-karat diamond jewelry. Heidi Klum notably donated her Bentley S3 convertible to garner one of the highest bids at €200,000.

amfAR galas have been held in cities like Cannes, Venice, New York City, Milan, Los Angeles, São Paulo, and Hong Kong, each garnering anywhere from €2,000,000 to €13,000,000 to support amfAR's research.

== Public health education and outreach ==
=== Syringe exchange programs ===
Krim's original view on needle exchange was largely affected by exposure through visits to foundational needle exchange programs:

On one visit, Mathilde met a clearly pregnant woman coming to exchange syringes. Mathilde was very upset. After the woman left the exchange, Mathilde spoke to the exchange worker. "That woman should be in treatment, not exchanging syringes." "Yes," the worker replied, "but the prenatal clinics do not accept drug addicts, and the drug abuse treatment programs do not accept pregnant women." -Don C. Des Jarlais, Ph.D.

After interactions like these, Krim began work with the Outside In needle exchange program in Portland, Oregon, beginning in 1989; this program was a service program for youth who had run away. Led by Kathy Oliver, amfAR helped gain insurance support for the program, and later compiled a report that showed the effectiveness of the study: needle discard rates in Portland neighborhoods decreased as a result of the study.

Krim later used amfAR's research funding apparatus to help David Purchase begin a needle and syringe exchange program in Tacoma, Washington. He used the money granted to analyze Tacoma's syringe exchange programs. Similarly to the results found in the Portland study, Purchase found that hepatitis B, C and HIV rates were much lower for users in Pierce County who exchanged their needles than those who did not. The study also found low HIV rates among women who use the exchange for IUD injections.

=== amfAR AIDS Handbook ===
The first AIDS handbook was published in 1999 as an effort to give a "comprehensive" and "concise" description of HIV/AIDS and methods of prevention. This 496-page book was intended for the general public, as opposed to their HIV/AIDS Treatment Directory intended for medical professionals. This book was used in a study intended to see the effects of AIDS education on elementary education. The study found statistically significant increases in AIDS comprehension in students who were educated using the amfAR AIDS Handbook. The handbook stands as one of amfAR's attempts at public education for AIDS/HIV related topics.

=== Trans Pacific Partnership opposition ===
In May 2015 amfAR released a report showing that increases in intellectual property rights of pharmaceutical countries would drive up the price of some drugs that are desperately needed in the developing world, namely countries who rely on affordable antiretroviral drugs. The group says that would hamper the global fight against AIDS (and other diseases) at an unsustainable rate. This report marked the first time that amfAR involved itself in economic policy that indirectly pertained to AIDS, and its rally against Trade-Related Aspects of Intellectual Property Rights (TRIPS) reached national attention as a provision of the TPP that was traditionally seen to be benign.

== Controversies ==
=== Cole's chairmanship ===
Kenneth Cole served as the amfAR chairman for 14 years and as a board member for a total of 30 years. In 2015, following years of controversy, he stepped down and now has no involvement in the organization.

==== Harvey Weinstein scandal ====
At amfAR's 22nd annual benefit in Cannes, France, in May 2015, Harvey Weinstein made a deal with amfAR chairman Kenneth Cole: Weinstein would auction off two items (one being a sitting with a famous fashion photographer and the second being tickets to a Hollywood film awards event) on the condition that $600,000 of the proceeds raised at the auction would be donated as a charitable gift to the American Repertory Theater. The reason for this contingent was that the American Repertory Theater promised Weinstein a $1.25 million reimbursement and a $500,000 charitable donation to the play Finding Neverland, which Weinstein was producing at the theater, on the condition that third parties donate the same amount to the production.

While the arrangement raised $309,669 for amfAR and was ruled "legitimate and lawful" by the law firm Gibson, Dunn & Cutcher, investigations and public outrage ensued surrounding the charity's financial integrity. A rift formed between Chairman Kenneth Cole and CEO Kevin Robert Frost, as evidenced by an email from Frost in 2015 saying, "Nothing about this deal feels right to me, and I believe we have not done due diligence to understand exactly what this money is being directed to or why amfAR is being used to facilitate these transfers."

AmfAR's management initially refused, citing their longstanding policy against doing so, but Weinstein was persistent. He had apparently donated $2 million to ART on the condition that if he could raise more money from others before June 1, 2015, they would return the contribution. Cole and Weinstein reportedly agreed that ART and amfAR would split any money from the lots up to $1.2 million evenly, and all money above that amount would be exclusively amfAR's. Except for a last-second insert attributed to Cole noting that ART would get some of the money from one of the lots, a fashion shoot with Mario Testino, there was nothing else to indicate to bidders where their money was going. Cole told Vanity Fair later that he had always felt bullied by Weinstein, and the insert was a small act of resistance.

Weinstein demanded amFAR repay him immediately instead of waiting for the money for the lots to come in. In early 2016 the organization's board retained attorney Tom Ajamie to investigate the transaction, who concluded that Weinstein's failure to disclose all relevant information had exposed amfAR to material risks to its reputation if the deal had turned out to be illegal. The report divided the board, with several members resigning over what they saw as Cole's failures. After Weinstein found out that some of the people Ajamie talked to had shared information about his rumored history of sexual misconduct, information that became public knowledge in September 2017, Weinstein demanded that board members who had read the report sign non-disclosure agreements, leading to more resignations.

In April 2017, 19 members of the Board of Trustees contacted the Attorney General to explain that Cole had proceeded with this deal in spite of the objections of the wider executive management team, as confirmed by their spokesperson Steven Goldberg. Following legal struggles surrounding the benefit to private investors of charitable donations, Weinstein pushed amfAR to sign nondisclosure agreements that indicated no wrongdoing and no further probing. As a result, four members (Mervyn Silverman, Vincent Roberti, Arlen Andelson and Jonathan Canno) refused to sign and went to petition the Attorney General on the impropriety of Kenneth Cole. In that time two other board members had resigned.

==== Cole's term limit proposal ====
On November 13, NBC News obtained a letter signed by 60 gay rights community members calling for his resignation. This letter was signed by Greg Louganis, an Olympic diver; Larry Kramer, playwright and activist and amfAR contributor Peter Staley, among others. As a result of the scandal, Kenneth Cole stepped down as chairman after a 14-year tenure. Cole initially couched his decision to step down, along with four other board members, as the result of term limits being imposed by the amfAR Board of Trustees with his support. Later, however, the attorney general's charity bureau sent a letter to the board on February 2, which exposed a proposal by Cole which allowed him to maintain his role as chairman in spite of new term limits. The attorney general's office sent a second letter on February 6 that mandated the board update its term limits and end Cole's tenure. The attorney general allowed him to stay as a non-voting member for six months while his replacement is determined. With the calls for resignation by many on the Board of Trustees, and a mandate from New York Attorney General Eric Schneiderman's office, Cole announced his decision to step down at an amfAR gala on Wednesday, February 7, 2018.

=== Sharon Stone's advocacy ===
In 1995, actress Sharon Stone began to serve as a spokesperson for amfAR. She said this resulted in a negative impact on her career causing Hollywood to blacklist her for eight years.

== See also ==
- Timeline of HIV/AIDS
- Luc Montagnier - Recipient of Mathilde Krim Fellowship for Basic Biomedical Research
- ACT UP
- Denver Principles
- People With AIDS
- Management of HIV/AIDS
