= ACRIA =

American HIV/AIDS organization

ACRIA (formerly AIDS Community Research Initiative of America) is a New York City–based non-profit and community-based AIDS service organization.

== History ==
Founded in 1991 to provide community based clinical drug trials for people living with AIDS. They also run the HIV Health Literacy Program (HHLP). ACRIA can trace their history back to the founding of the Community Research Initiative by Michael Callen and Joseph Sonnabend.

Additionally, through the ACRIA Center on HIV & Aging, the organization is recognized as an international authority on the emerging issue of older adults and HIV.

In 2018, ACRIA acquired Love Heals: The Alison Gertz Foundation for AIDS Education, a non-profit that focused on sex education and AIDS prevention with youth in New York City schools.
