= Dana Tippin Cutler =

Lawyer and news personality

Dana Tippin Cutler is a lawyer and news personality. She and her husband, Keith Cutler, are the first married couple to preside over a television court show, Couples Court with the Cutlers. Cutler was the first Black woman elected as Missouri Bar president.

== Biography ==
Dana Tippin is the daughter of a lawyer, James Tippin.

Dana Tippin attended Spelman College, earning her bachelor's degree in English. While there, she began dating Keith Cutler. The couple married on June 10, 1989. They have three sons.

Cutler earned her Juris Doctor degree from the University of Missouri-Kansas City Law School.

Cutler is a partner at her father's firm, James W. Tippin & Associates, where she focuses on education law and civil defense litigation.

In 2016, Cutler was the first Black woman elected to serve as the Missouri Bar president. In the position, she created the Courageous Collaboration program, which brings lawyers together to discuss implicit bias and unintentional judgment, for which she received a Partnership Award from the American Bar Association.

Cutler is a DEI expert and teaches courses around the country.

In 2017, Couples Court with the Cutlers debuted. In the show, the Cutlers advise couples struggling with infidelity allegations. The show was nominated for the Daytime Emmy Award for Outstanding Legal/Courtroom Program in 2018 and 2019. The show was canceled in 2020 and rebooted in 2023.

In 2019, the Cutlers appeared in the Celebrity Judge Week of Who Wants to Be a Millionaire, winning $51,000 for UNCF.

== Awards and honors ==
- 2014: Litigation Practitioner Award, Missouri Lawyers
- 2017: Partnership Award, American Bar Association
- 2017: President's Award, University of Missouri-Kansas City Law School
- 2018: Woman of the Year, Missouri Lawyer Weekly
- 2018: Alumni Achievement Award, University of Missouri-Kansas City Law School
- 2022: Purcell Professionalism Award, The Missouri Bar
- 2023: National Conference of Bar Presidents Fellows Award
