= Mathilde Krim =

Swiss-American medical researcher (1926–2018)

- מתילדה קרים
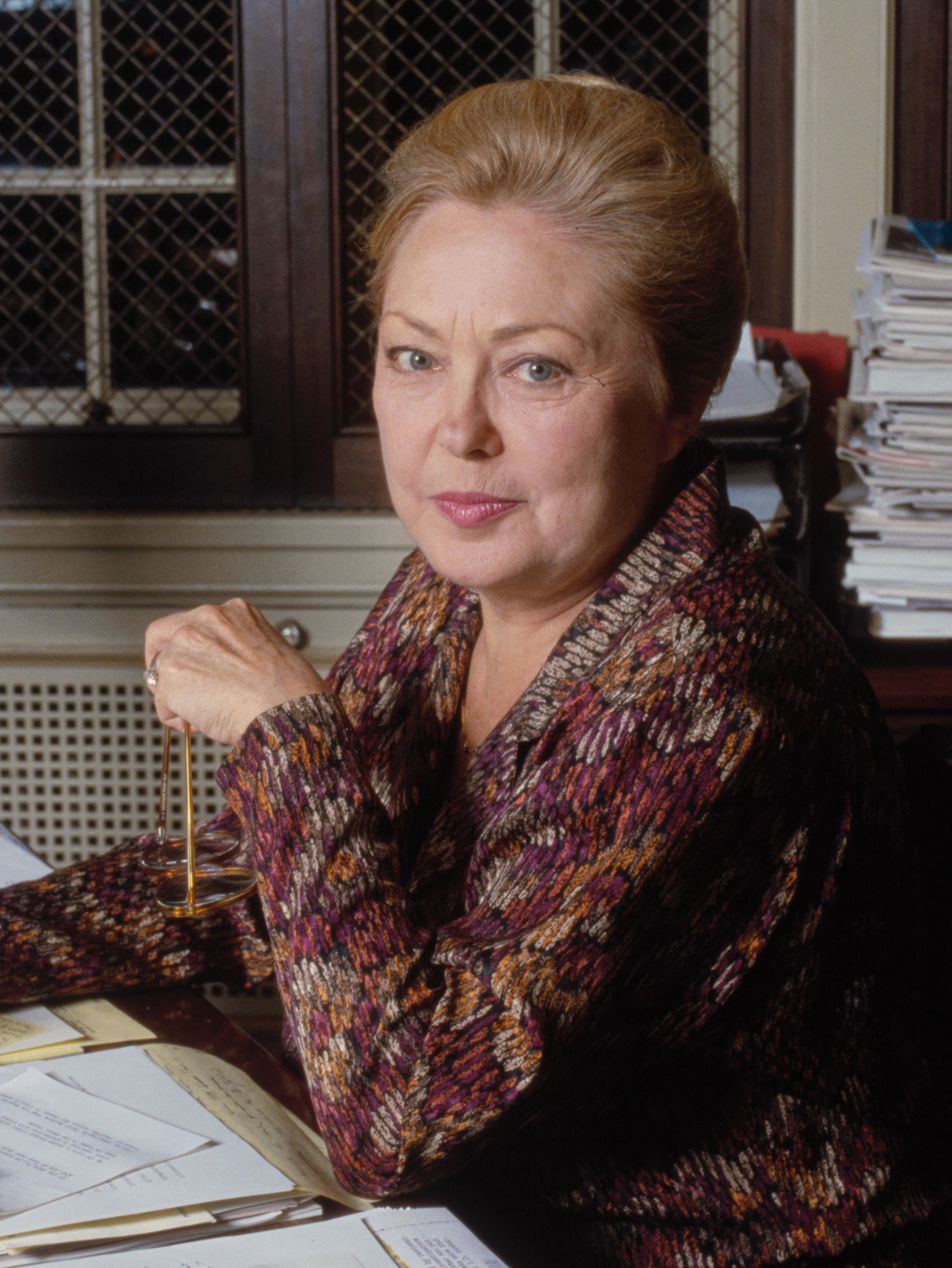
- Krim in 1987
- Born: Mathilde Galland; July 9, 1926; Como, Italy
- Died: January 15, 2018 (aged 91); Kings Point, New York, US
- Education: University of Geneva (PhD)
- Occupation: Medical researcher
- Employer(s): Weizmann Institute of Science, Cornell University Medical School, Sloan-Kettering Institute for Cancer Research
- Known for: Founding chairman of amfAR
- Spouses: David Danon (m. 1948, divorced) Arthur B. Krim (m. 1958; died 1994)
- Children: 1
- Awards: 16 doctorates honoris causa, Presidential Medal of Freedom, Jefferson Awards Award for Greatest Public Service Benefiting the Disadvantaged

Mathilde Krim (Hebrew: מתילדה קרים; née Galland; July 9, 1926 – January 15, 2018) was a medical researcher and the founding chairman of the American Foundation for AIDS Research (amfAR).

== Biography ==
Mathilde Galland was born in Como, Italy to a Swiss Protestant father of Italian ancestry and an Austrian mother who had grown up in Czechoslovakia. Her father was a PhD agronomist who worked for the City of Geneva and her mother was a homemaker. Mathilde was the eldest of four children. In her early childhood, the family lived in Grand Lancy, a suburb of Geneva. She often accompanied her father on his forays into the woods for the study of mushrooms, snakes, and other animal and plant species, possibly sparking her interest in biology. In Grand Lancy and with her young siblings, Mathilde helped raise chickens, ducks, rabbits, and geese and tend the vegetable garden. During World War II, when even neutral Switzerland experienced food shortages, the vegetable garden and the animals they raised proved essential toward keeping the immediate as well as the extended family fed. During a few wartime summers, she was sent to work on a rural farm where she was fed and housed in return for her labor.

In high school, Galland excelled in all subjects but particularly gravitated to science and literature. Although she yearned to study at the university following high school she was discouraged from doing so by her traditional father who preferred that she pursue secretarial training. Despite her father’s objections, she persisted and enrolled at the University of Geneva in the biology program. In 1948, she married David Danon, a Bulgarian-born man from Mandatory Palestine whom she met at the University of Geneva where he was enrolled in the School of Medicine. In late 1951, with her infant daughter who was born that same year, she converted to Judaism. Danon had been exiled by the British from Palestine for his involvement in the Irgun, a Zionist paramilitary organization fighting against British rule in Palestine prior to the 1948 creation of Israel. In an interview with Donald Neff, a Time magazine correspondent, Krim said that she saw him as a “dashing and heroic figure” dedicated to a noble cause that had used terrorism to achieve its ends. While attending the University of Geneva, the couple made trips to the French countryside where they met with former members of the French Resistance to purchase weapons and explosives. They arranged for those munitions to be shipped to the Zionist resistance group, the Irgun.

In 1953, Mathilde became the first woman to receive a PhD in biology from the University of Geneva. Later that year, Mathilde, David and their young daughter relocated to Israel. There, David enlisted as a medical officer with the nascent Israeli Air Force and Mathilde began research work at the Weizmann Institute of Science in Rehovot. The family first settled in military housing on an Air Force base near Rehovot. At the Weizmann Institute, Mathilde worked in the laboratory of Dr. Leo Sachs on the team that developed the amniocentesis technique to determine the gender of a fetus. Mathilde and David divorced two years after their arrival in Israel after which she and her daughter moved to live on the campus of the Weizmann Institute.

In 1956, Mathilde was introduced to Arthur B. Krim, an American attorney and film executive who was on the Weizmann Institute’s board of directors. As a single young woman, she had been asked by Institute administrators to be Arthur Krim’s date at a welcome dinner for the board members, most of whom were accompanied by their spouses. She had at first declined, fearing she would share few common interests with the American businessman. However, she was persuaded to attend the dinner and, to her surprise, Mathilde soon found herself fascinated and impressed by Arthur Krim due to his charm, his kind heart, his interest in science, and his intellect. Following a long-distance courtship, Mathilde and Arthur were married in New York City in December 1958 after which she and her daughter moved to his Manhattan home.

After moving to the U.S., Krim began research at the Cornell Medical College in the field of virology, having become interested in the study of viruses causing cancer. In 1962, she transferred to Memorial Sloan-Kettering Cancer Institute, to further pursue cancer research, where she was later named Director of the Interferon Laboratory. In addition to her full-time scientific research, Krim and her husband raised money for causes such as Israel bonds, the Weizmann Institute, the Urban League, the NAACP, the Democratic National Committee, numerous Democratic presidential and down-ballot Democratic candidates, the Hebrew Arts School, the African American Institute, and further donations for Israel.

== Medical research career, activism and philanthropy ==
From 1953 to 1959, she pursued research in cytogenetics and cancer-causing viruses at the Weizmann Institute of Science in Israel, where she was a member of the team that first developed a method for the prenatal determination of sex.

After her marriage to Arthur Krim and her move to New York she joined the research staff of Cornell University Medical School. Arthur B. Krim was a New York attorney, head of United Artists, later founder of Orion Pictures, active member of the Democratic Party, and advisor to Presidents John F. Kennedy, Lyndon Johnson, and Jimmy Carter. On May 19, 1962, the Krims hosted an exclusive celebrity-filled soirée at their home following the 45th birthday party for President John F. Kennedy at Madison Square Garden, including Marilyn Monroe, Maria Callas, Harry Belafonte, Jimmy Durante, Diahann Carroll, Bennett Cerf, Adlai Stevenson, and John and Robert F. Kennedy. During the course of their marriage, Arthur and Mathilde Krim were very active in the American civil rights movement, the movements for independence in Rhodesia and South Africa, the gay rights movement, and in numerous other civil liberties and human rights movements. Their home in Manhattan was the first home visited by Nelson Mandela on his visit to the United States following 27 years in South African prisons for his political activities. Nelson Mandela, Bishop and Nobel Peace Prize Laureate Desmond Tutu, and freedom fighter Joshua Nkomo of Zimbabwe, were among their personal friends.

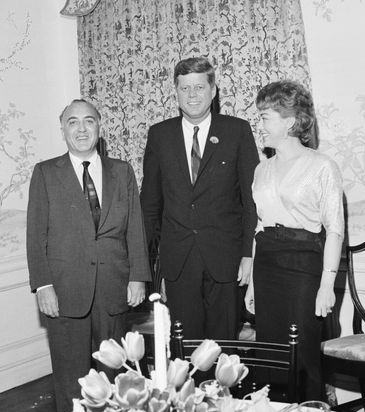
The Krims hosting John F. Kennedy (center) in 1962

In 1962, Krim became a research scientist at the Sloan-Kettering Institute for Cancer Research and, from 1981 to 1985, she was the director of its interferon lab. Until 2015, she held an academic appointment as Adjunct Professor of Public Health and Management at Columbia University's Mailman School of Public Health. She was a fluent speaker, reader, and writer of four foreign languages: German, Italian, Hebrew, and French.

Soon after the first cases of what would later be called AIDS were reported in 1981, Krim recognized that the new disease raised grave scientific and medical questions and that it might have important socio-political consequences. She dedicated herself to increasing the public's awareness of AIDS and to a better understanding of its cause, its modes of transmission, and its epidemiologic pattern.

Contributing to the fight against AIDS, she established AIDS Medical Foundation in 1983. Later, the Foundation merged with a similar organization and called the American Foundation for AIDS Research (amfAR). With Elizabeth Taylor, she founded the American Foundation for AIDS Research contributing generous amounts of her own funds, opening her home for numerous fundraising events, and lending her considerable skills to raising awareness about AIDS and raising funds for AIDS research. Even after stepping down from the amfAR chairmanship in 2005, she continued working on behalf of AIDS awareness through AmfAR and continued to help in raising funds for AmfAR research grants, until her death. In his 1997 book, The Gay Metropolis: The Landmark History of Gay Life in America, Charles Kaiser wrote: “One scientist outside the government was more important than any other heterosexual in New York City in sounding the alarm about the growing [AIDS] crisis. Her name was Mathilde Krim.”

== Awards and recognition ==
Krim was awarded 16 doctorates honoris causa and received numerous other honors and distinctions. In August 2000, President Bill Clinton awarded her the Presidential Medal of Freedom, the highest civilian honor in the United States, in recognition of her "extraordinary compassion and commitment".

In 2003, Krim received the Award for Greatest Public Service Benefiting the Disadvantaged, an award given out annually by Jefferson Awards.

== Death ==
Krim died at her home in Kings Point, New York on January 15, 2018, at age 91. At her death she was survived by her daughter, her sister, and two grandchildren.
