= William S. Gubelmann =

American inventor

William S. Gubelmann (1863 – September 26, 1959) was an American inventor who held about 5000 patents, invented adding machines, accounting machines and cash registers. Popular Mechanics called Gubelmann “the father of all calculating machines in use today”. The New York Times said that his inventions "formed the basis of the business machine industry".
