= HIV/AIDS activism =

Social movement advocating for a larger societal response to HIV/AIDS

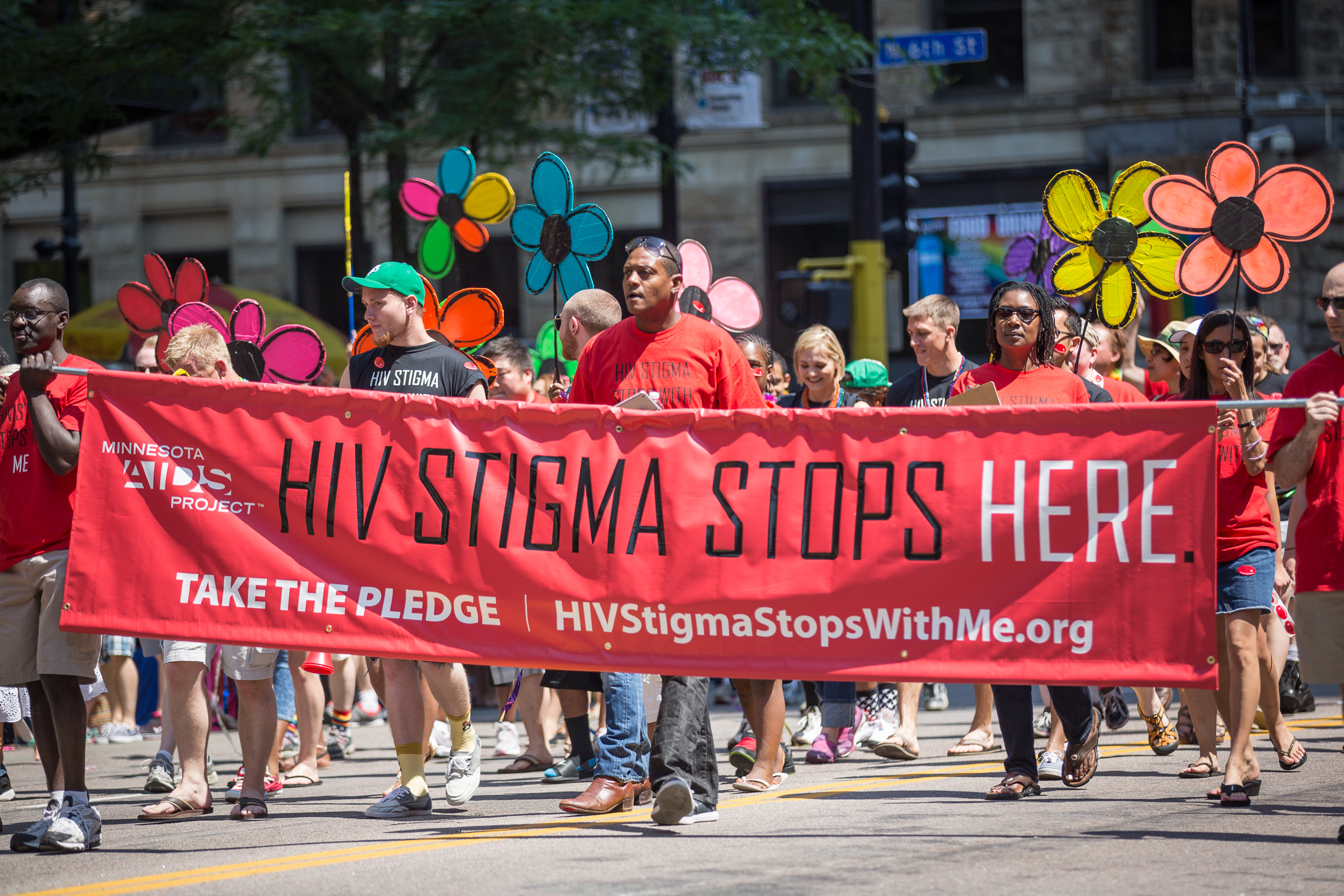
Activists march in the 2013 Twin Cities Pride Parade against prejudice faced by people with AIDS (PWAs) that was held in Minnesota.

Socio-political activism to raise awareness about HIV/AIDS as well as to advance the effective treatment and care of people with AIDS (PWAs) has taken place in multiple locations since the 1980s. The evolution of the disease's progress into what's known as the HIV/AIDS pandemic has resulted in various social movements fighting to change both government policies and the broader popular culture inside of different areas. These groups have interacted in a complex fashion with others engaged in related forms of social justice campaigning, with this continuing on to this day.

As a major disease that began within marginalized populations, efforts to mobilize funding sources, scientifically advance treatment, and also fight discrimination have largely been dependent on the work of grassroots organizers directly confronting public health organizations (often government-managed medical bureaucracies) as well as news media businesses, pharmaceutical companies, groups of politicians, and other institutions. In the United States, this has involved political fights involving both the U.S. Congress and the U.S. presidency given the country's healthcare system. As recounted in journalist Randy Shilts' book And the Band Played On, multiple U.S. doctors inside of groups such as the World Health Organization (WHO) labeled the public policy failures as the crisis developed as "an indictment of our era" and had to become activists on their patients' behalf, especially since initially so many "had died unlamented and unremarked by the media." For instance, Dr. Robert Gallo of the National Cancer Institute (NCI) and other institutions sought U.S. news outlets' attention in going against the executive branch and working for anti-AIDS measures that would resemble Project Apollo during the Space Race in both determination and funding.

Issues such as the controversial lack of action undertaken by the Ronald Reagan administration in the U.S. during the 1980s alongside rampant homophobia and the spread of misconceptions about HIV/AIDS led to outright discrimination against people with HIV/AIDS, especially in the days of the pandemic before mass activism. Work by advocates for social justice spread across different parts of the U.S. over time. Movements of mass demonstration such as the grassroots collective ACT UP arose to fight for the rights of PWAs and to work to end the pandemic. Methods of protest have included the writing of position papers and making posters, public marches (and other formalized acts of civil disobedience), candlelight vigils, die-ins, and many creative approaches to direct action, such as kiss-ins involving public affection between individuals who aren't 'in-the-closet'.

== Background of activist methods and principles ==
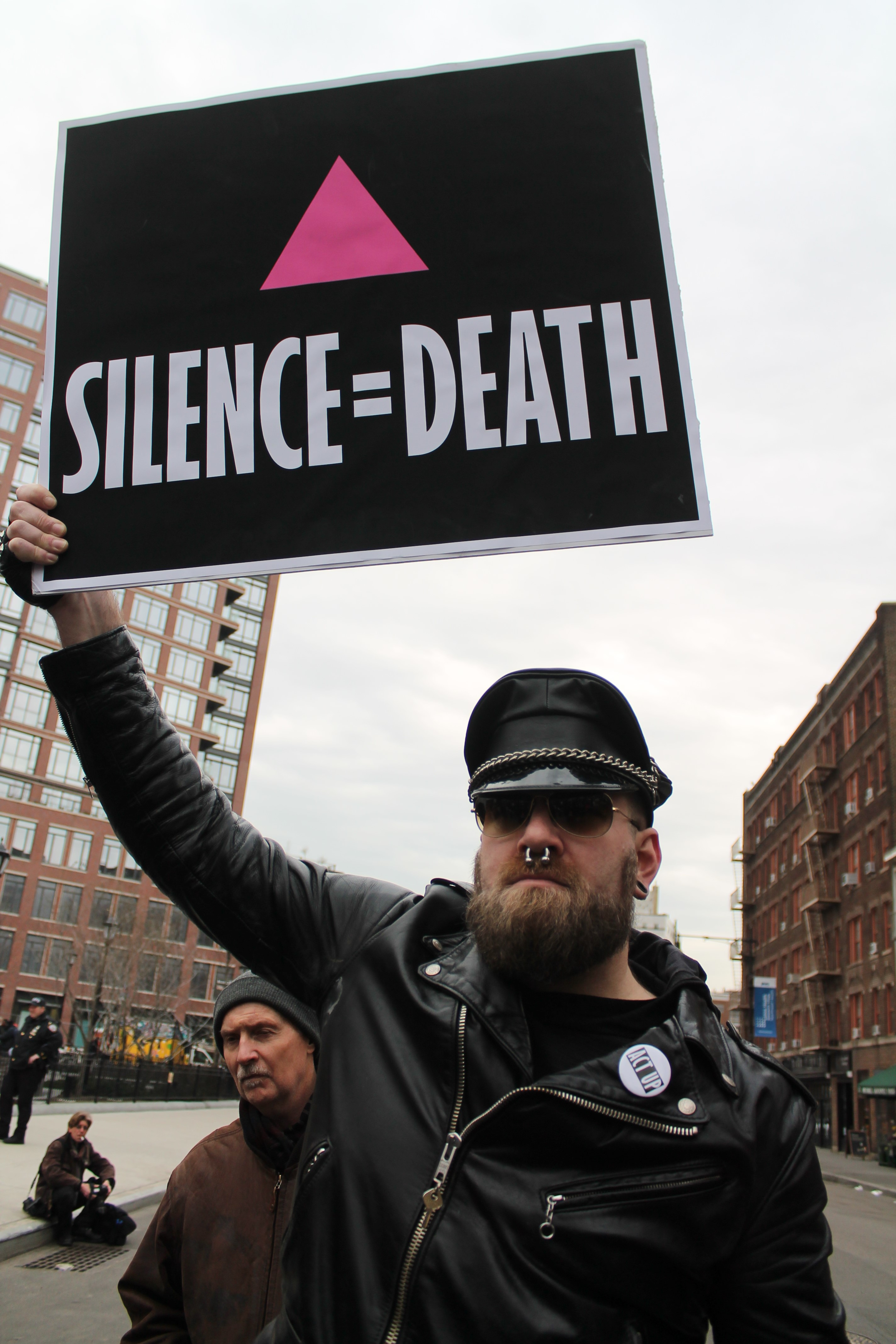
A demonstrator waves a placard using the "Silence=Death" slogan during a 2017 event in New York City.

Activist groups focused on HIV/AIDS in the United States initially drew their numbers from the bisexual, lesbian, and male homosexual communities as a whole, with socio-political campaigns including culturally active patients who were struggling with their healthcare themselves. As the HIV/AIDS pandemic progressed, both friends and family of those diagnosed often joined in, with this evolution often occurring alongside allies from other communities such as many marginalized peoples. The social movement fundamentally tried to increase awareness about the serious disease as well as to advance the effective treatment and care of people with AIDS (PWAs). Protest organizations such as the grassroots collective ACT UP have gone up against not just a popular culture that had to change but also core aspects of American politics with respect to U.S. healthcare services.

As a major illness related to public policy across different locations, political fighting spread to discord involving both the U.S. Congress and the U.S. Presidency. As recounted in journalist Randy Shilts' book And the Band Played On, multiple U.S. doctors inside of groups such as the World Health Organization (WHO) labeled government failures as the crisis developed as "an indictment of our era" and had to become activists on their patients' behalf, especially since initially so many "had died unlamented and unremarked by the media." For example, Dr. Robert Gallo of the National Cancer Institute (NCI) and other institutions sought U.S. news outlets' attention in going against the executive branch and working for anti-AIDS measures that would resemble Project Apollo during the Space Race in both determination and funding.

In South Africa, the fight against HIV/AIDS began largely among patients themselves only to grow to a broad social concern among most of the nation's gay men. Movements of mass demonstration and related campaigns then evolved into a general coalition of South Africans pushing for anti-disease treatments as a part of a socio-economic right to healthcare. Multiple advocates within the nation's civil society have fought based on an underlying ideal that sets forth a shared approach to human rights in South Africa. The collapse of the apartheid system and the evolution of the nation's politics throughout the 1990s involved parallel actions taken to both fight homophobia in the anti-racist movement and also to fight racism in the movement on behalf of LGBT rights. Activists have perceived the hatreds behind government actions as of the same moral level as wider patterns of exclusion and poverty that hurt South African communities.

Highly bigoted attitudes supporting discrimination as more and more were diagnosed with HIV/AIDS endured for many years as, according to one scholarly report, a significant number of South Africans perceived the disease as "just desserts" that destiny had imposed upon those engaged in supposedly sinful actions. Talk of South Africa experiencing a "gay plague" boiled over in the country's culture. To be specific, certain private hospitals in the nation refused to admit HIV/AIDS patients at all.

Nonetheless, over time, as one scholarly report has concluded, the "early location of gay rights within [the] wider human rights discourses of the anti-apartheid movement" and its tie to activism supporting those with HIV/AIDS resulted in a general shift towards progressive politics. This has meant South Africans as a united peoples embracing compassionate care for those with HIV/AIDS as a matter of fundamental ethics, at least to a degree. The example of seminal anti-racist campaigner Simon Nkoli going into HIV/AIDS related activism "and his early openness about his HIV status... [alongside] his subsequent death from AIDS over a decade later" particularly "became a catalyst".

In general terms, methods of protest by HIV/AIDS activists have included marching with placards at appearances of political leaders (or at "a 'Pride' march"), leafletting, the distribution of art projects, the hanging of certain politicians in effigy, sit-ins, and die-ins among other activities. Such activism may be regarded as in some sense "revolutionary". During die-ins, protesters lie motionless in the street, often blocking traffic, or in the aisles of a church (such as at ACT UP's 1989, Stop the Church action), to symbolize all the people who have died of AIDS.

In the U.S., the iconography of the inverted pink triangle (which is a pride symbol arising from a social "reclaiming" that was originally utilized by Nazi Germany in its persecution of homosexuals alongside the yellow badge assigned to Jews) and the slogan 'Silence=Death', together, is common. Artists and activists from the originating collective, and then later ACT UP have used posters and stickers of the image across New York City, then worldwide, during the worst times of the HIV/AIDS crisis in the 1980s. The image is now owned by ACT UP and members often wear it on t-shirts, buttons, and utilize it in various other types of media.

== History of anti-disease activism by region ==
=== History of anti-disease activism in Africa ===
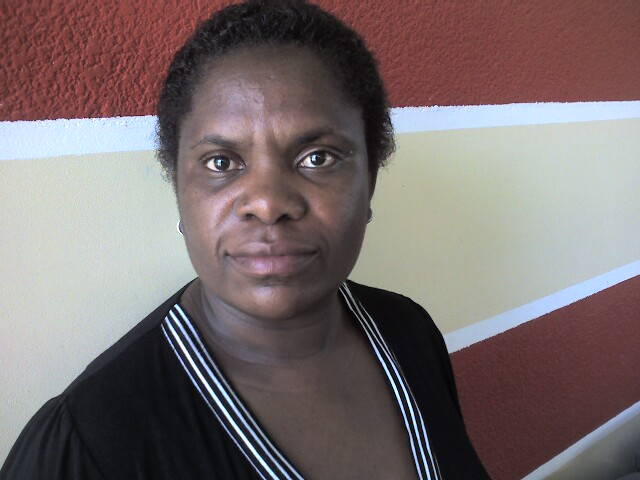
Civil rights campaigner Betty Makoni has notably worked in Zimbabwe and elsewhere on behalf of women and girls victimized in the HIV/AIDS pandemic.

The widespread belief in various misconceptions about HIV/AIDS has resulted in a serious handicap holding back medical progress in certain locations inside of Africa. A number of activists have worked in a variety of different contexts to promote effective treatment and to fight back cultural barriers to their work. One particular viewpoint that's drawn international media attention is the 'virgin cleansing myth', with certain African communities believing that sex with a inexperienced partner can somehow cure either AIDS or the underlying HIV infection itself. Activist Betty Makoni is one particular campaigner who has repeatedly worked to dispel the myth both within her home communities inside Zimbabwe and elsewhere. Her efforts in HIV/AIDS activism and in supporting the broader issue of civil rights involving violence against women has involved setting up the charitable group known as the Girl Child Network, and the U.S. news publication The Huffington Post has commented upon her "courageous work", especially given the socio-political tensions around human rights in Zimbabwe. She's the central figure behind the internationally known documentary film Tapestries of Hope.

In terms of social activism by Africans against their governments directly, the controversial 2014 Anti-Homosexuality Bill inside of Uganda, which aimed at making homosexual sex a criminal offense, earned condemnation from individual campaigners as well as from groups such as The Global Fund to Fight AIDS, Tuberculosis and Malaria (which is also known simply as the Global Fund). Said organization stated that excluding marginalized peoples significantly compromises efforts to stop the spread of HIV/AIDS in Uganda, which has been a widespread social problem to the point that the President's Emergency Plan for AIDS Relief (known as PEPFAR) group based out of the U.S. gave a full $285 million in recent years to fight the pandemic's lingering spread. Hardline forms of social conservatism and other ideological opinions have presented a significant challenge inside the nation. The Global Fund's work in HIV/AIDS activism has been paralleled by the U.S. embassy's actions condemning the bill.

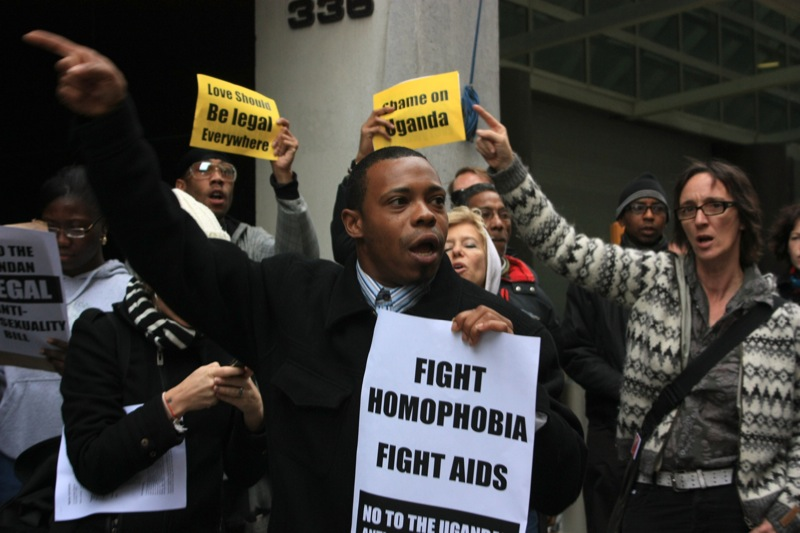
ACT UP protesters in New York City demonstrate against Uganda's controversial Anti-Homosexuality Bill.

Broadly speaking, human rights in Uganda have involved campaigns to support healthcare for HIV/AIDS patients as well as multiple other marginalized communities struggling due to the lack of proper attention. In March 2023, the International AIDS Society (IAS) issued an official statement pleading for those in power to "ground Uganda’s laws and policies in science rather than prejudice". The organization warned that efforts to "reinforce stigma and discrimination against the LGBTQ+ community" constitute a challenge that significantly "hamper[s] progress on ensuring safe access to health services." The IAS argued in broad terms on behalf of a "legal environment that protects– rather than prosecutes– gay men and other men who have sex with men, people who use drugs, trans people and sex workers to safely access" HIV/AIDS related treatment and additional measures.

Struggles against HIV/AIDS have been a persistent problem in South Africa specifically, with over five million of the nation's people being HIV positive as of 2004 data. In the shadow of the collapsed apartheid system, the country-wide debate on the disease has focused on the intense conflict between social activists aligned with the Treatment Action Campaign (TAC) and the nation's government. Official support for AIDS denialism and the administering of what has been seen as inadequate access to HIV treatment outraged activists who viewed the government's policies as a denial of their basic right to life. Efforts by the TAC and associated individuals achieved success when, in September 2003, the South African Cabinet finally instructed the country's health ministry to create a comprehensive HIV treatment and prevention plan. Later commentators have considered the TAC campaign as one of the most successful if not the most successful example of civil society pushing for human rights in South Africa since the end of apartheid.

HIV prevalence varies drastically from country to country inside Africa. For example, UNAIDS research in 2007 found that 23.9% of adults in Botswana had been inflected in comparison to the values of 12.5% in Mozambique and 2.8% in Rwanda. The South Africa and Zimbabwe had values of 18.1% and 15.3%, respectively.

=== History of AIDS activism in North America ===
In the United States, AIDS, which had not yet been named, came into the awareness of affected communities in the early 1980s, and reached critical mass by the mid 1980s.

Because of the long incubation period of HIV, which can go on for over a decade while symptoms of AIDS gradually appear, HIV was not noticed at first by health professionals or by those infected. By the time the first reported cases of a mysterious, fatal immune system condition were found in large U.S. cities such as New York City, the prevalence of infection had passed 5% in some communities.

The AIDS epidemic officially began on 5 June 1981, when the U.S. Centers for Disease Control and Prevention (CDC) issued findings in its Morbidity and Mortality Weekly Report newsletter of unusual clusters of pneumocystis pneumonia (PCP) caused by a form of pneumocystis carinii (now recognized as a distinct species titled pneumocystis jirovecii). The report looked specifically at five homosexual men in the Los Angeles area. Publications such as the San Francisco Chronicle and the Los Angeles Times gave the CDC's findings news coverage. June 1981 additionally saw the first AIDS patient getting received into care under the aegis of the U.S. National Institutes of Health (NIH). By August 1981, the CDC reported a full 108 cases of the new disease across America.

On 27 July 1982, a meeting of gay community leaders and activists met in Washington D.C., with representatives from the Centers for Disease Control (CDC) to pressure for a name change of the what was up till that point called GRID (gay-related immune deficiency). They proposed the term AIDS (Acquired Immune Deficiency Syndrome), as evidence by this point had made it clear that the virus was in no way limited to gay people. At this point the retrovirus itself had not yet been isolated. This would not happen till 1983, when it would initially be called by several names, including LAV and HTLV-III before being named HIV in 1986.

1982 also saw the first congressional hearing exploring the now renamed AIDS, called by Representative Henry Waxman of California. The CDC estimated at this point that tens of thousands would likely be affected by the disease. A change in terminology meant the proliferation of the new, CDC-coined name of Acquired Immune Deficiency Syndrome (AIDS).

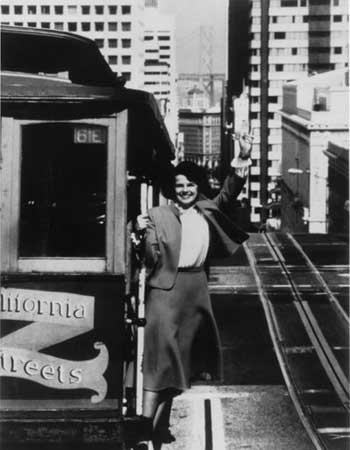
During her tenure as Mayor of San Francisco, politician Dianne Feinstein declared the first "AIDS Awareness Week" event.

That same year, a group of New Yorkers (Nathan Fain, Larry Kramer, Larry Mass, Paul Popham, Paul Rapoport, and Edmund White) officially established the Gay Men's Health Crisis (GMHC). An answering machine in the home of GMHC volunteer Rodger McFarlane, who later served as GMHC's first paid director, became the world's first AIDS hotline. It notably received over one hundred calls the first night. Besides functioning as a hub for social activism, GMHC established what are known as 'buddy programs' to provide people with AIDS with help during day-to-day events.

Also in 1982, activists Michael Callen and Richard Berkowitz published How to Have Sex in an Epidemic: One Approach. In this short, pioneering work on what was now being called "safer sex", they described ways gay men could be sexual and affectionate while dramatically reducing the risk of contracting or spreading HIV. Both authors, gay men living with AIDS, set out the booklet as one of the first times men were advised to use condoms and other barrier methods when having sexual relations with other men.

In 1983, the GMHC sponsored a benefit performance of the Ringling Bros. and Barnum & Bailey Circus, which served as the first major fund-raising event for AIDS. That same year, the official AIDS Candlelight Memorial was held for the first time. The organization Lambda Legal Defense and Education Fund filed the world's first AIDS discrimination suit, receiving assistance from the GMHC.

In 1984, Dianne Feinstein, then mayor of San Francisco, declared the first "AIDS Awareness Week" event. Featuring the primary goal of educating staff and students from San Francisco Community College District, it involved informing people about causes, effects, and symptoms of AIDS as well as prevention methods. 1984 additionally saw the very first laboratory isolation of HIV, the breakthrough coming the separate research efforts of Dr. Luc Montagnier in France and Dr. Robert Gallo in the U.S.

By 1985, publications such as Annals of Internal Medicine warned that "even if all transmission of the virus were to stop immediately, the... syndrome would continue to be a major public health problem for the foreseeable future." That year additionally saw the rise to prominence of HIV/AIDS activist Ryan White, an Indiana teenager with AIDS who got barred from his school due to his status, and his life's work of speaking out publicly against AIDS stigma and discrimination. White eventually succumbed to the disease in 1990, dying at the age of eighteen.

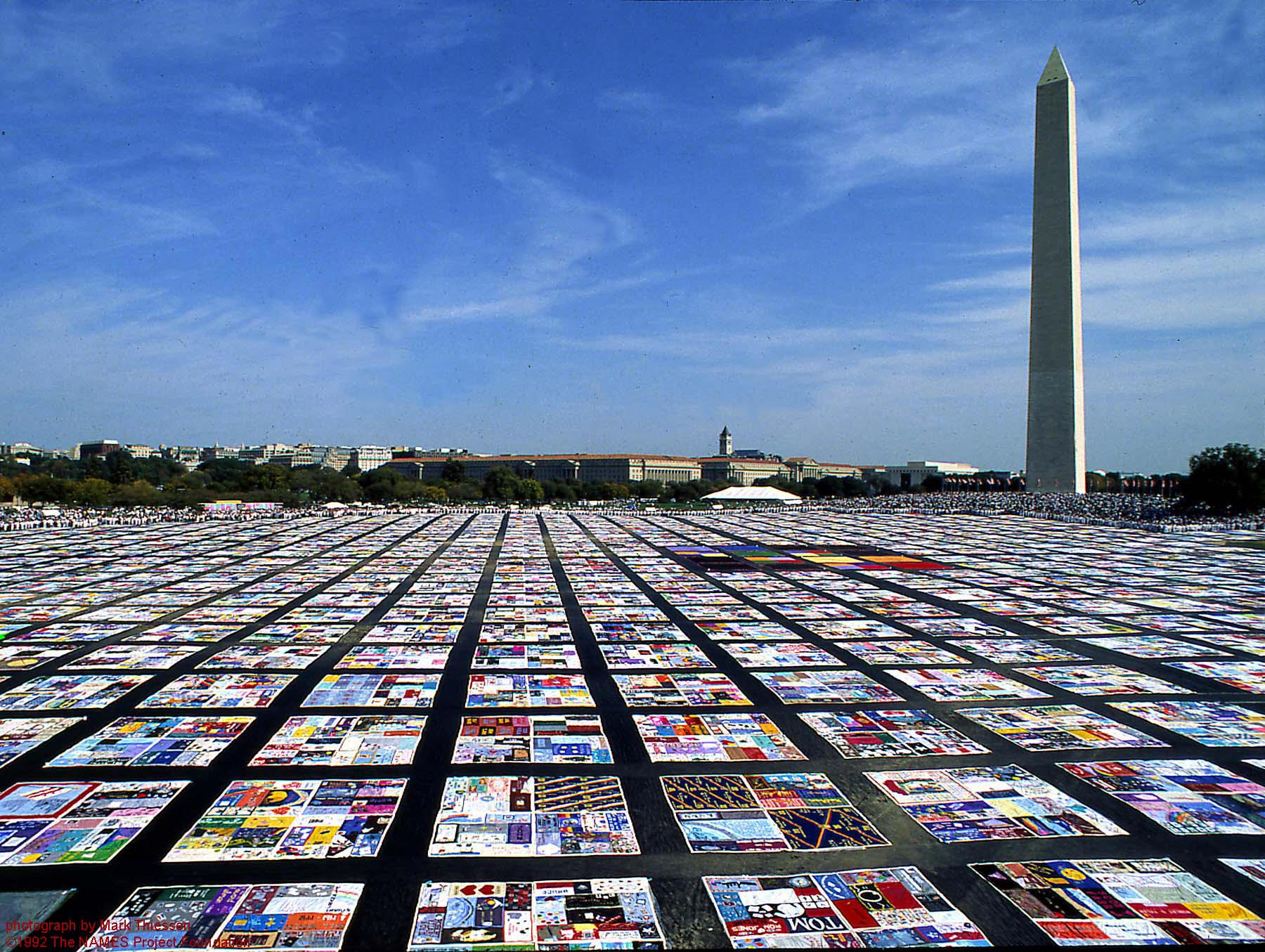
The AIDS Memorial Quilt is pictured as laid out beside the Washington Monument

A form of HIV/AIDS activism that has received mainstream coverage has been the creation of and public showings of the AIDS Memorial Quilt. Conceived in 1985 by activist Cleve Jones during a candlelight march held in remembrance of the 1978 assassinations of San Francisco Supervisor Harvey Milk and Mayor George Moscone, the idea came about after Jones requested people write the names of loved ones who died due to AIDS-related causes on signs. Those were then taped to the old San Francisco Federal Building. The scene at the side of the building looked like an enormous patchwork quilt to Jones, and he felt inspired to try and make the concept into a reality. The quilt represented an inflection point within Jones' own life, as an openly gay man who had suffered from internalized homophobia and thoughts of suicide in his earlier years. The first public display of the project was at San Francisco City Hall in 1987.

The most prominent HIV/AIDS activist group, ACT UP, got its start in 1987 at the Lesbian, Gay, Bisexual & Transgender Community Center in New York City. Larry Kramer spoke as part of a rotating series of speakers, and his well-attended, fiery speech focused on action to fight AIDS while condemning the Gay Men's Health Crisis (GMHC) group as not doing enough. Though a founder of GMHC, Kramer resigned due to his perceiving of the organization as politically impotent. During the 1980s and 1990s, ACT UP focused on direct action aimed at changing public policy. In a time of political inaction on AIDS, during the silence of the Reagan administration, the group became increasingly confrontational as larger numbers of gay men, in particular, were dying. The group also formed treatment action groups to put medical research and treatment into the hands of patient activists, as many hospitals were not treating People with AIDS, or not offering drug trials to those who wanted access. Many demonstrations were aimed at granting compassionate release of experimental treatments that the FDA was holding up in what ACT UP felt was excessive testing during a time of emergency.

For example, the group's 11 October 1988 protest picked up national media coverage as it successfully shut down the headquarters of the U.S. Food and Drug Administration (FDA) for a day. "Hey, hey, FDA, how many people have you killed today?" chanted a crowd estimated by ACT UP at between 1,100 and 1,500 people. The protesters additionally hoisted a black banner that simply read "Federal Death Administration" as well as hoisting an effigy of then President Ronald Reagan. The Atlantic later called it one of the most successful demonstrations during the time of the AIDS crisis.

That same year, funding for national, regional, and community-based organizations to fight HIV/AIDS began. (Comprehensive school-based education to begin teaching the young about the disease had started in 1987). Other changes due to activist pressure at the end of the 1980s were a reversal in the U.S. Department of Justice's decision making such that preventing discrimination against HIV patients became government policy plus a lowering of the price of AZT by 20%, the drug being one of the first effective treatments against HIV but having prohibitively massive costs at first. The former policy change became a matter of federal law in 1990 when President George H. W. Bush signed the Americans with Disabilities Act (ADA).

In terms of disease prevalence more generally, AIDS incidence increased rapidly through the 1980s only to peak in the early 1990s and subsequently decline into the dawn of the 21st century. Activism meant by the early 1990s the FDA started a process known as "accelerated approval" that got experimental yet promising drugs to individuals with AIDS faster.

In 2001, a CDC analysis of cases from 1981 through 2000 found that a full 774,467 persons had been reported with AIDS in the U.S. Of that total, 448,060 had died compared to 3542 persons with unknown vital status. The study's findings of 322,865 individuals living with AIDS were the highest ever reported. UNAIDS data collected in 2007 stated that 0.6% of adults in the U.S. had HIV in comparison to 0.4% of Canadian adults.

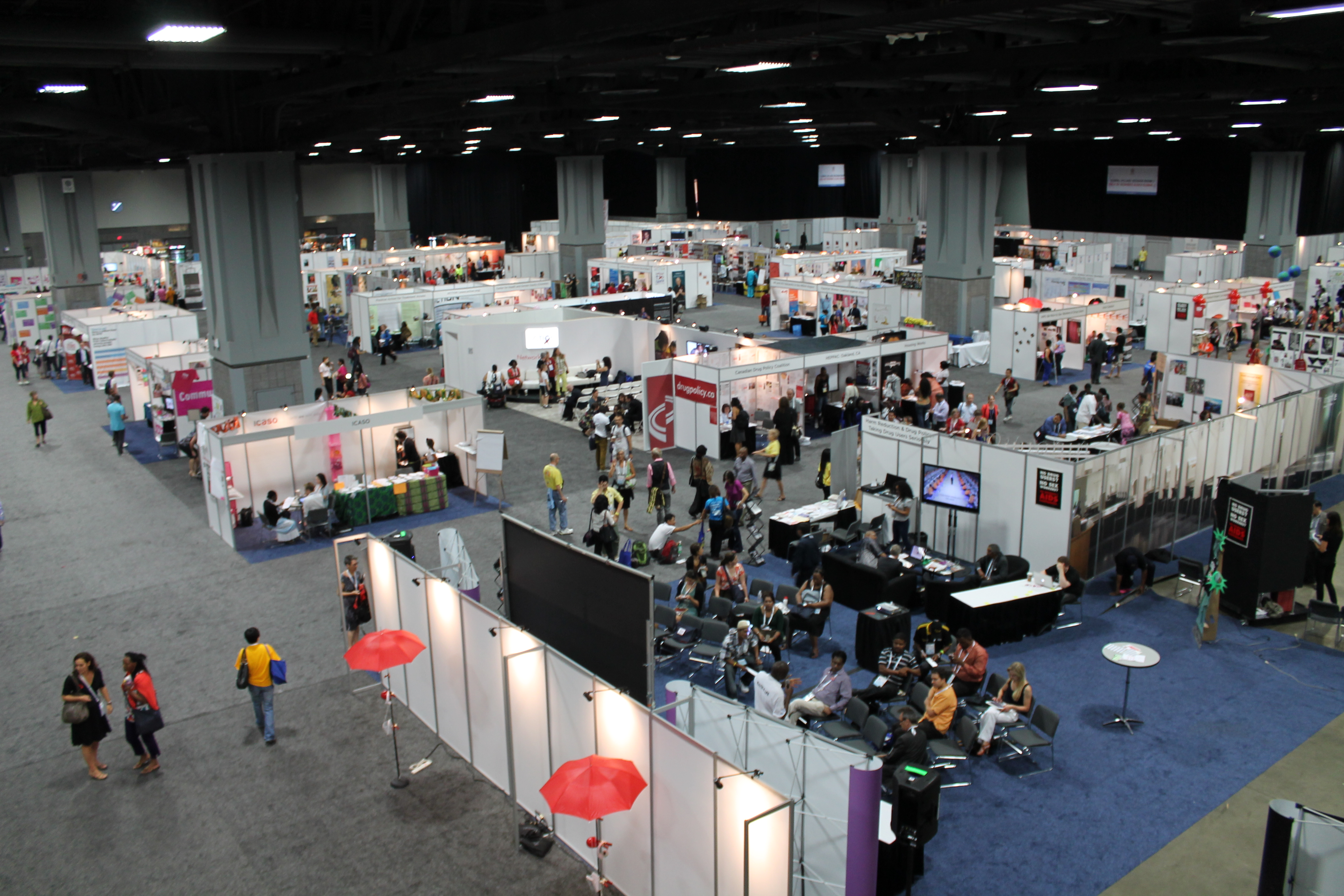
Individuals attend the International AIDS Conference that was held within Washington, D.C., in 2012

In the 2000s, the Obama administration issued a report finding that laws making HIV transmission a criminal offense do little to influence behavior while many "run counter to scientific evidence about routes of HIV transmission and effective measures of HIV prevention." In October 2018 California Governor Jerry Brown signed a bill into law that made knowingly exposing a sexual partner to HIV into a misdemeanor crime instead of a felony. WNYC labeled the change as "a legal and cultural milestone for the way Americans perceive HIV and AIDS."

The activist organization Treatment Action Group ((TAG) initially a subset of ACT UP New York) celebrated a victory in 2018 as well given that global spending on fighting tuberculosis hit a record high for 2017 compared to previous years. From 2016 to 2017, research spending jumped to $772 million from $726 million. TAG has spent years upon years pushing for better treatment of tuberculosis while taking careful note of the disease's status as a frequent problem for individuals with AIDS.

In Canada, activism took a very similar form as in the United States and Europe. A notable figure includes Manitoba based activist Albert McLeod, who has done extensive research on sociodemographic factors in HIV/AIDS rates in Indigenous communities across Canada, of note recognizing that Indigenous communities in Canada see a 3.5 times higher rate of HIV/AIDS when contrasted with other ethnic groups. McLeod is also involved in several Indigenous based organizations working for equity in healthcare access especially addressing HIV/AIDS care, including Communities, Alliances, and Networks also known as CAAN and the Nichiwakan Native Gay Society, recognized as one of the first Indigenous-Queer groups to be formed in Canada. In Manitoba, a central Canadian province facing a 2026 HIV public health emergency, Village Lab is advancing HIV activism through community-based research, storytelling, and policy advocacy that confront racism, colonialism, stigma, and systemic gaps in care. https://www.villagelab.ca/

=== Latina/o HIV/AIDS activism contributions in North America ===
In 1989, AIDS diagnosis was 2.8 times higher among Latinos than among non-Hispanic whites. The Latino community made up about nine percent of the population of the United States, and were the group with the second highest percentage of recorded AIDS diagnoses. According to treatment activist Moises Agosto-Rosario, A prominent struggle within the Latino community was the lack of bilingual medical information in rotation, this lack of education was leading Spanish speaking people with AIDS to die from opportunistic infections. To combat this, a Spanish-language communication committee in New York was started for translating all medical, preventative, and treatment information into Spanish and distributing it throughout the community; from this New York’s Latina/o caucus of ACT-UP was created in 1990.

Latina/o AIDS activist groups, such as the Latina/o caucus and The National Latina/o Lesbian and Gay Organization (LLEGO), advocated for HIV/AIDS treatment research and more efficient processing times for prescription drugs. In response, the National Institutes of Health (NIH) created the AIDS Clinical Trials Group, a network for clinical researchers of AIDS and other related diseases. These trials worked toward the development of protease inhibitors and antiretroviral combination drugs that are still used for modern HIV/AIDS treatments.

In addition to the treatment advocacy in the continental U.S., the Latina/o caucus worked to assist those with HIV/AIDS in Puerto Rico. At the time the island of Puerto Rico had one of the highest concentrations of HIV infections and related deaths. There was a concurrent epidemic of intravenous drug use on the island, and due to their status as a territory there were limits to disbursement of health care, making it harder for people to get the medications they needed. The Latina/o Caucus organized the first branch of ACT UP in Puerto Rico and began a series of protests in the streets of San Juan. One prominent example was the demonstration outside of the Hotel Caribe Hilton on August 22, 1990, where about thirty protestors covered themselves in fake blood and chanted criticisms of the island's commonwealth government.

=== History of anti-disease activism in Europe ===
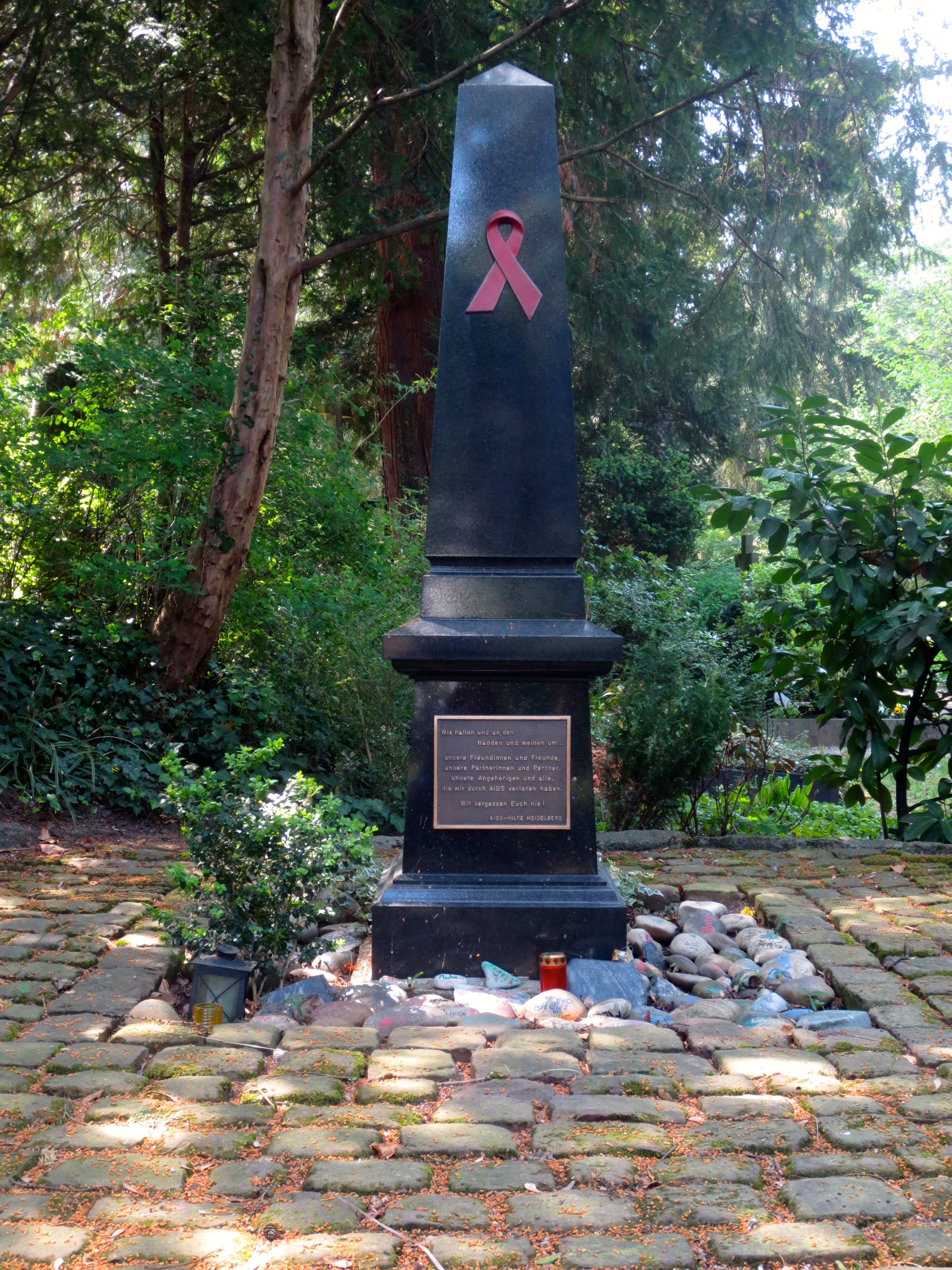
An obelisk stands in memorial to victims of AIDS inside a Heidelberg, (Germany) cemetery

Cases of mysterious deaths in Europe during the early 1980s caused the proliferation of discrimination, fear, and stigma like in other areas. The World Health Organization (WHO) has remarked in a statement that "AIDS was—and in absolute, global terms still is—a stinging challenge to the values of modernity received, for better or worse, from Europe's Age of Enlightenment... [since] [a]ffluent, confident, gender-progressive, often social-democratic welfare states awoke, in the early 1980s, to an uncomfortable reminder of their human frailty." On example of the extreme reactions by some politicians is far-right French figure Jean-Marie Le Pen and his proposal of confining people with HIV/AIDS in prison-like facilities.

European politics have frequently involved championing the fight against HIV/AIDS as a human rights issue. Health care itself is also fundamentally seen as a matter of fundamental rights, requiring major government investment and regulation. Despite this, social changes have taken place since the world economic recession of the late 2000s that have shifted budgets' focus toward cost containment and increased efficiency.

In 1987, Diana, Princess of Wales, opened the UK's first purpose built HIV/AIDS unit intended exclusively for patients infected with the disease, at London Middlesex Hospital. In front of the media, Princess Diana shook the hand of a man with AIDS to demonstrate that it was safe to do so. She later stated, "HIV does not make people dangerous to know. You can shake their hands and give them a hug. Heaven knows they need it."

One of the world's most important anti-disease events got started in central Europe. Held yearly on 1 December, World AIDS Day was first conceived in August 1987 by James W. Bunn and Thomas Netter. The two public information officers worked for the Global Programme on AIDS at the World Health Organization in Geneva, Switzerland.

Bunn later commented to NPR about his motivations at the time, stating that:

"The stigma that surrounded AIDS was actually twofold. One of it was what you could easily argue had to do with homophobia. But also there was a stigma of fear. There was a lot that people felt they did not know about the epidemic[,] and they were afraid. And they were right to be afraid because of the things that they were hearing... [while] the stigma that surrounded it made it something that people didn't want to talk about. If it came into their lives... also, for people who were affected by it, they did not want to bring up... their experience... with it because[,] in those days, people were being fired from their jobs. They were being denied Social Security benefits. They were being ostracized by their families. They were being evicted from their homes because they were sick and dying."

=== History of anti-disease activism in South America ===
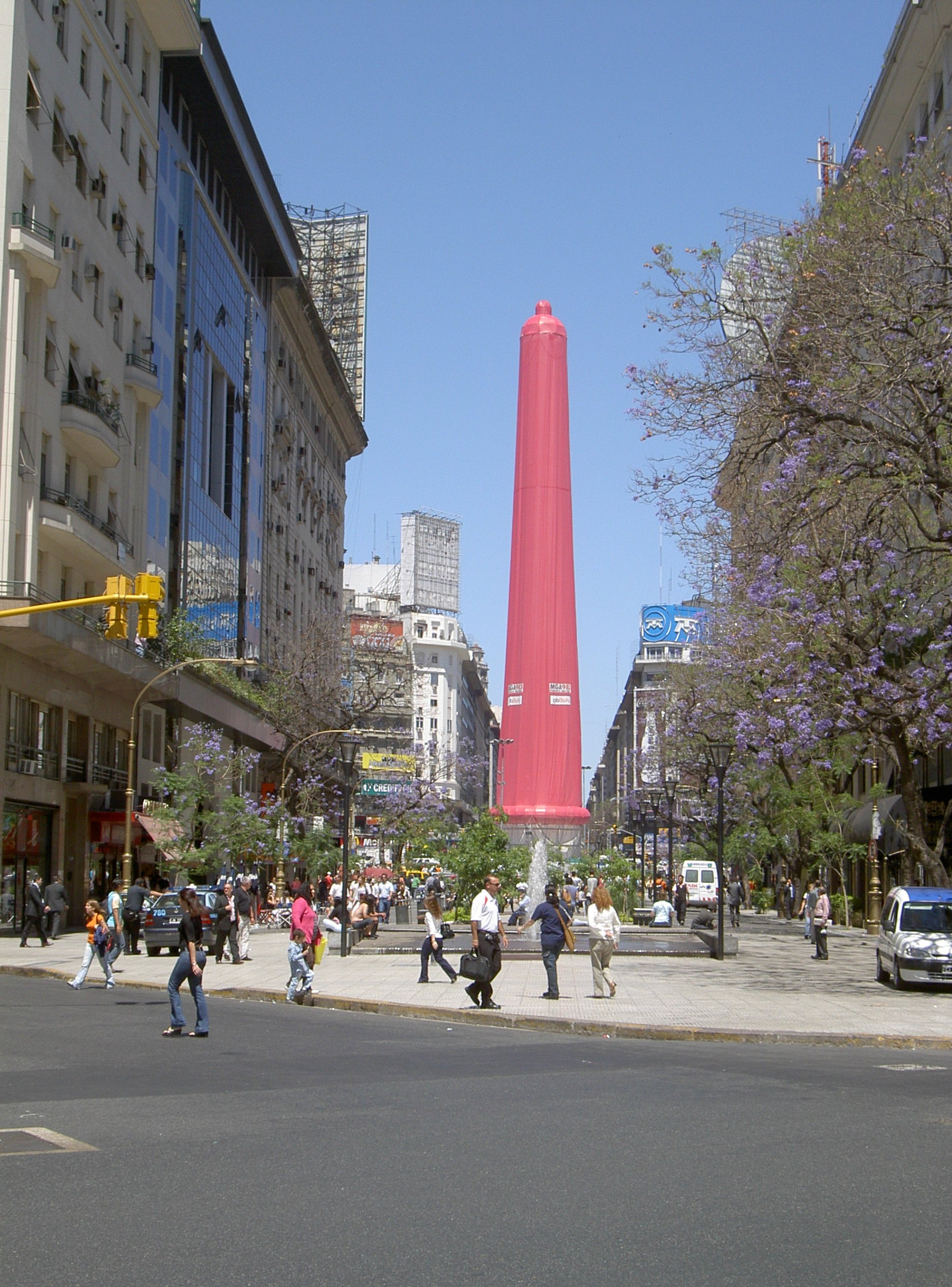
A massive condom was placed on the Obelisk of Buenos Aires, Argentina as part of an awareness campaign for the 2005 World AIDS Day

Latin America and the Caribbean contain large number of HIV cases. According to 2023 data from UNAIDS, more than 2.3 million people are living with HIV in Latin America (a 9% increase since 2010), and about 340,000 in the Caribbean (a 22% decrease since 2010). High rates of new HIV infections have been reported in Haiti, making up one-third of all infections in the Caribbean region. AIDS-related deaths have decreased overall, but increased among women in Costa Rica, El Salvador, Mexico, Paraguay, Panama, Peru, Belize, Guyana, Suriname and Cuba.

HIV/AIDS activists have noted an atmosphere of pervasive media and cultural bias and discrimination against those diagnosed.

According to Luis E. Soto-Ramírez of Science:

There are issues in Latin America and the Caribbean that make epidemic conditions unique to the region. Many people still do not understand that HIV/AIDS is a viral, not a moral, infection. Widespread stigma and discrimination hamper efforts to achieve universal access to HIV prevention, treatment, and care. HIV transmission continues to occur among populations at higher risk, including sex workers, males that have sex with males (but increasing among heterosexuals), injecting drug users, and migrants. Prevention efforts, including education campaigns, are disorganized and poorly supported because budgets are mainly devoted to treatment.

As with Africa, HIV prevalence differs notably from country to country inside Latin America and the Caribbean, although the values don't vary to the extent as in between African nations. For example, UNAIDS research in 2007 found that 3.0% of adults in the Bahamas had been inflected in comparison to the values of 1.1% in the Dominican Republic and 0.1% in Cuba. When looking at new cases of infection, reporting presented at the International AIDS Conference held within Durban, South Africa in 2016 stated that only Chile and Uruguay managed to achieve a small reduction. Nations such as Argentina, Bolivia, Colombia, and Ecuador among others had data showing worsening trends.

== Analysis of anti-disease activism ==
A 2018 report found that while efforts by ACT UP "arguably hastened the science, treatments and services for persons with HIV/AIDS", there still remained "found long-term effects on the activists" such as "concurrent posttraumatic stress responses and posttraumatic growth that are distinct from the experiences of persons affected by the illness but not involved with the campaign." However, the activists expressed gratitude for the opportunity to be a part of a close, positively-focused community.

The U.S. National Institutes of Health (NIH) has stated as an organization that the "pressure of activists demanding early access to promising AIDS treatments" prompted fundamental changes within it. Activists managed to bust "the 'ivory tower' mentality wide open and forever" altered the specific paths "the search for treatments at NIH is conducted". The organization has credited the activists both with pushing to have drugs in the experimental stage more widely available for patients as well as more broadly having made stopping AIDS a systematic research priority.

== See also ==
- AIDS Awareness Week
- Cost of HIV treatment
- "Free Me"
- History of HIV/AIDS
- HIV-positive people
- How to Survive a Plague
- Misconceptions about HIV/AIDS
- NAMES Project AIDS Memorial Quilt
- Tapestries of Hope
- Timeline of early HIV/AIDS cases
- World AIDS Day
