= Timeline of the Cox Report controversy =

The timeline of the Cox Report controversy is a chronology of information relating to the People's Republic of China's (PRC) nuclear espionage against the United States detailed in the Congressional Cox Report. The timeline also includes documented information relating to relevant investigations and reactions by the White House, the U.S. Congress, the Federal Bureau of Investigation (FBI), and United States Department of Justice.

== 1995 ==
June

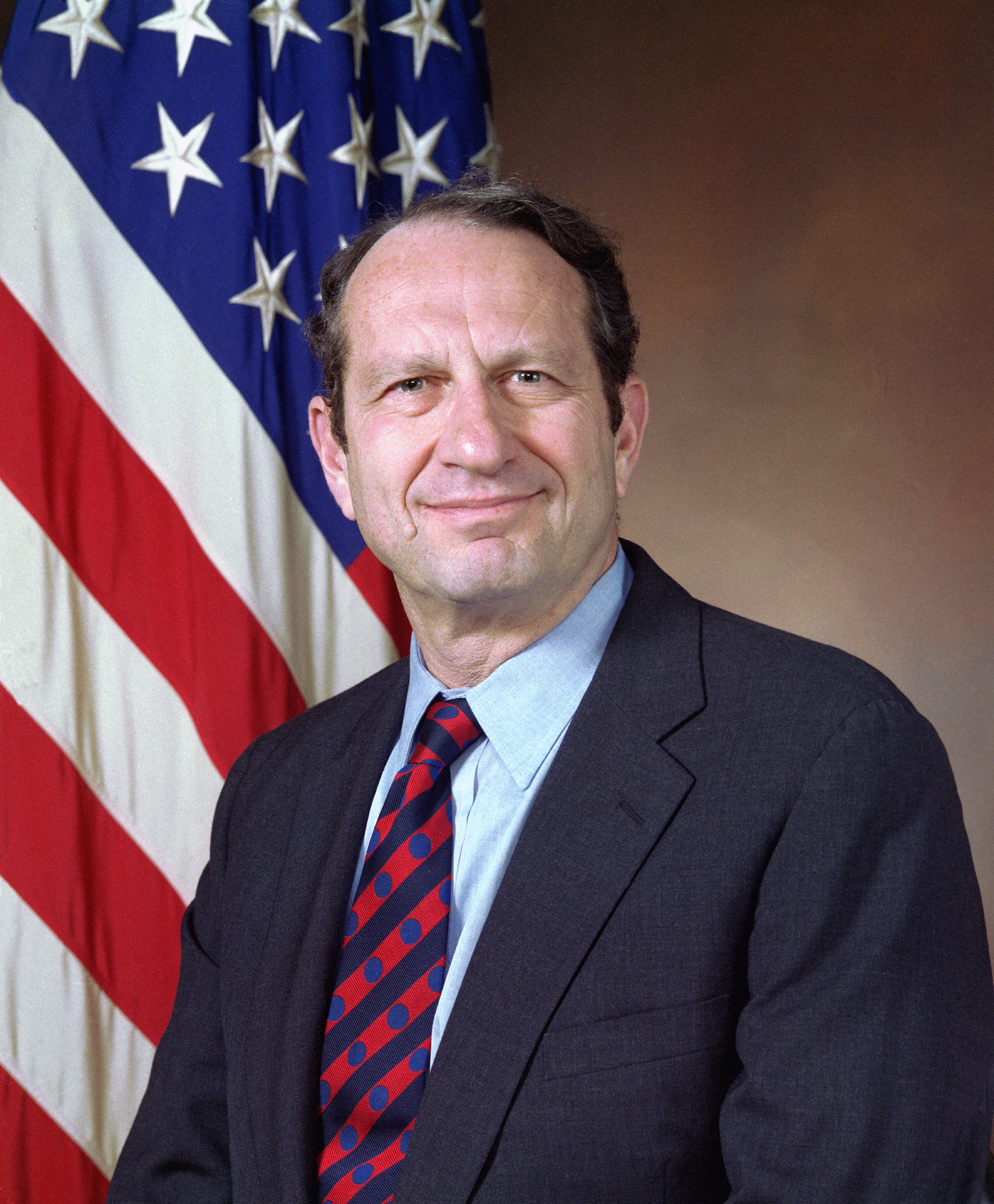
John Deutch

- Sometime in June, a walk-in agent for People's Republic of China intelligence services approached the United States Central Intelligence Agency (CIA) office in Taiwan and provided them with an official PRC document classified "Secret" that contained design information of all seven of America's nuclear warheads. President Bill Clinton's Director of Central Intelligence, John Deutch, was informed the following month.

July

- Clinton's former energy secretary Hazel O'Leary, Chief of Staff Leon Panetta, and deputy director of Central Intelligence George Tenet learned of the PRC's theft of America's nuclear warhead designs sometime in July 1995, but did not inform the president at that time.

October

- On or about October 31, the FBI first learned of the PRC's possible theft of advanced U.S. nuclear weapons designs.

November

- CIA Director Deutch informed Clinton's National Security Adviser Anthony Lake about the PRC's theft of America's nuclear weapon designs sometime in November 1995. The president was not briefed at that time.
- In late 1995 and early 1996, United States Department of Energy (DOE) intelligence official Notra Trulock took his findings on the PRC's theft of advanced U.S. nuclear warhead designs to the FBI. Trulock made the discovery independently from the CIA while analyzing data from the PRC's recent underground nuclear test. A team of FBI and DOE officials then traveled to three weapons labs (Livermore, Sandia and Los Alamos) and pored over travel and work records of lab scientists who had access to the relevant technology. By February, they narrowed its focus to five possible suspects.

== 1996 ==
- In early 1996, Notra Trulock told CIA officials about his discoveries on the PRC's theft of America's nuclear warhead designs.

February

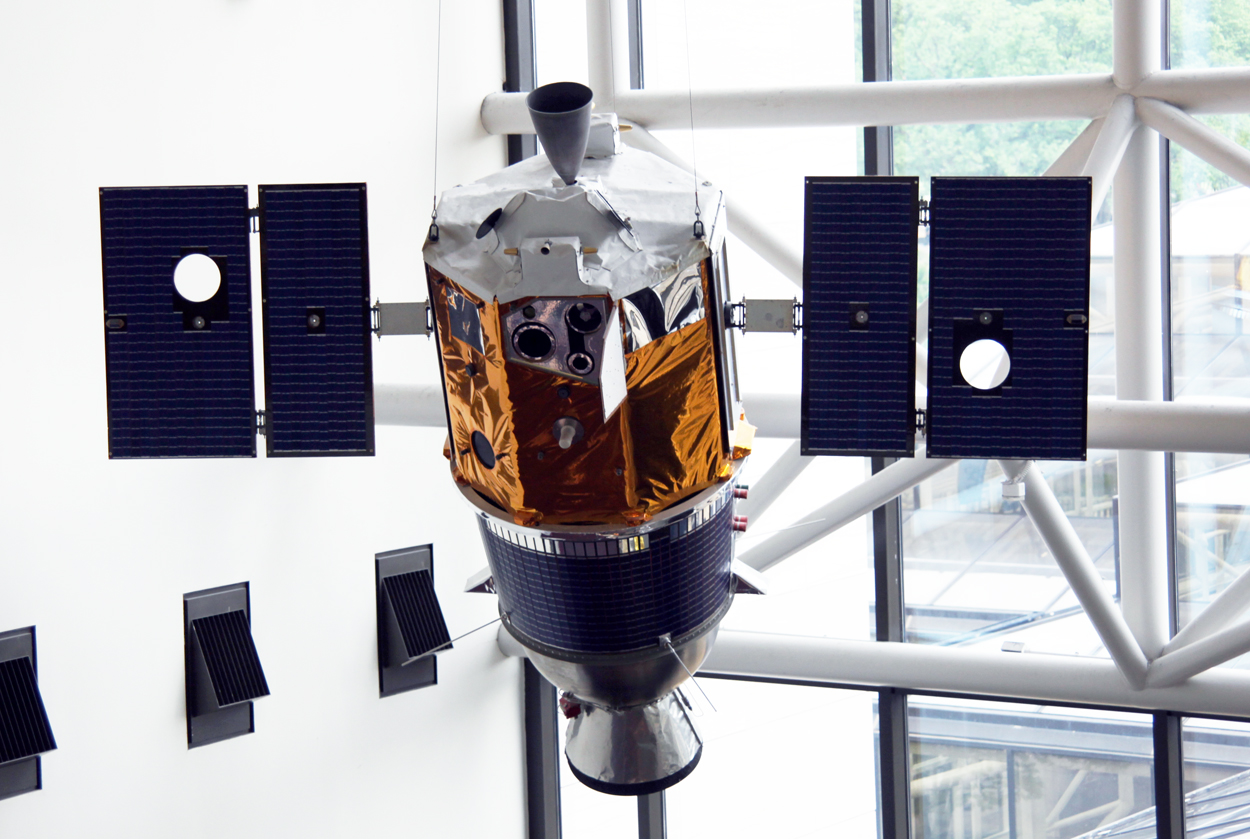
A model of a typical satellite

- On February 14, a People's Liberation Army (PLA) space launch vehicle crashed, destroying the Loral Space & Communications satellite (Intelsat 708) it was carrying. PRC officials kept American investigators away from the crash scene at first, supposedly for their own safety. When the Americans were allowed into the crash site, they found the militarily sensitive encryption chips missing from the control box where they were attached. Encryption chips prevent unauthorized people from commanding, or receiving information from, satellites in space. Loral and Hughes Electronics' engineers were accused of giving missile secrets to China in the ensuing investigation of the launch failure.

March

- On March 27, Energy Department officials were notified by an American agent that it appeared the PRC recently stole U.S. neutron bomb secrets.

April

- Sometime in April 1996, intelligence analyst Ronald Pandolfi wrote a report for the CIA warning about military implications of Hughes Electronics' sharing of missile expertise with the PRC. The CIA decided not to distribute the classified report to select government officials, as is routinely done with intelligence estimates, saying it was insufficiently rigorous. The report would be kept from Congress until late 1998.

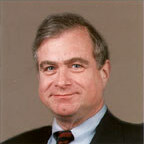
Samuel "Sandy" Berger

- On April 13, the Energy Department briefed the White House about the PRC's espionage at Los Alamos weapons lab. A group of senior officials including Notra Trulock met with Deputy National Security Advisor Sandy Berger and told him that the PRC appeared to have acquired both W-88 nuclear and neutron bomb secrets and that a spy for the PRC might still be at Los Alamos. Berger later stated he did not inform the president of the espionage until July 1997, but did inform Congress in April 1996. The Energy Department also notified Defense Secretary Perry, Attorney General Janet Reno, and FBI Director Louis Freeh about China's alleged espionage during this same time period. According to the National Security Advisor's testimony to the National Security Committee, no one informed the president.
- Sometime in April, Vice President Al Gore's national security advisor Leon Fuerth was informed about the PRC's nuclear espionage at America's weapons laboratories. Some documents showed he may have been informed as early as 1995, though Fuerth did not recall a briefing then. Fuerth did not mention the espionage to Gore until March 1999.

May

- On May 30, the FBI formally opened a criminal investigation into the theft of the W-88 nuclear design. Originally only 1 or 2 agents were assigned to the case and the inquiry made little progress over the rest of the year.

June

- In late June or early July, the CIA issued an internal government statement that declared they may have misread their original analysis of the documents delivered by the double agent to their Taiwan offices and that China may not have America's weapons designs after all. The FBI, in turn, suspended their investigation of the matter (which had just started) for about six weeks.

== 1997 ==
- Sometime in early 1997, Energy Department intelligence analyst Notra Trulock learned of new nuclear espionage evidence. He attempted to contact newly appointed Energy Secretary Federico Peña about the information but was not given an appointment to see him until July.

April

- The FBI issued a classified report that recommended background checks on foreign visitors to nuclear laboratories be reinstated. The Energy Department ignored the recommendations for 17 months.

May

- In May 1997, Los Alamos laboratory scientist Wen Ho Lee came under suspicion, in what some later called a political character assassination. (He was a suspect since February 1996 in the FBI's investigation of China's nuclear espionage campaign.) He was promoted to a position that required an even higher security clearance than he already had. The Justice Department repeatedly refused FBI requests to tap Wen Ho Lee's phone and gain access to his computer over the next few months because there was insufficient evidence against him. The judge in the case would later apologize to Lee. Lee took a plea bargain on September 13, 2000, to a single count under the Espionage Act 18 USC 793(e), withholding national defense information, in order to avoid the 'vagaries' of a jury trial, and all other counts were dropped. Many considered Lee to have been seriously mistreated, and the president later apologized to him. Lee would go on to win a multimillion-dollar lawsuit against the government and the media for invasion of privacy.
- Former Sandia and Los Alamos laboratory employee Peter Lee (no relation to Wen Ho Lee) gave top secret information on antisubmarine radar technology away to Chinese nuclear-weapons experts during a May 11 lecture at the Institute of Applied Physics and Computational Mathematics in Beijing, China. Lee pleaded guilty to filing a false statement about his 1997 trip to China and to giving classified laser data to Chinese scientists during an earlier trip to China in 1985.

July

- Sometime in July, Secretary Peña met with Notra Trulock who had new information about China's ongoing espionage at America's nuclear weapons laboratories. After the meeting, Peña sent him to see National Security Advisor Sandy Berger. Trulock then briefed Berger. Afterwards, Berger then briefed President Clinton about China's nuclear espionage campaign for the first time.

August

- Sandy Berger went to China August 10. Before he left, he assigned his NSC aide in charge of proliferation to assess the nuclear espionage situation. The aide later stated that, while the espionage had taken place, Trulock's briefing was only a worst-case scenario.

September

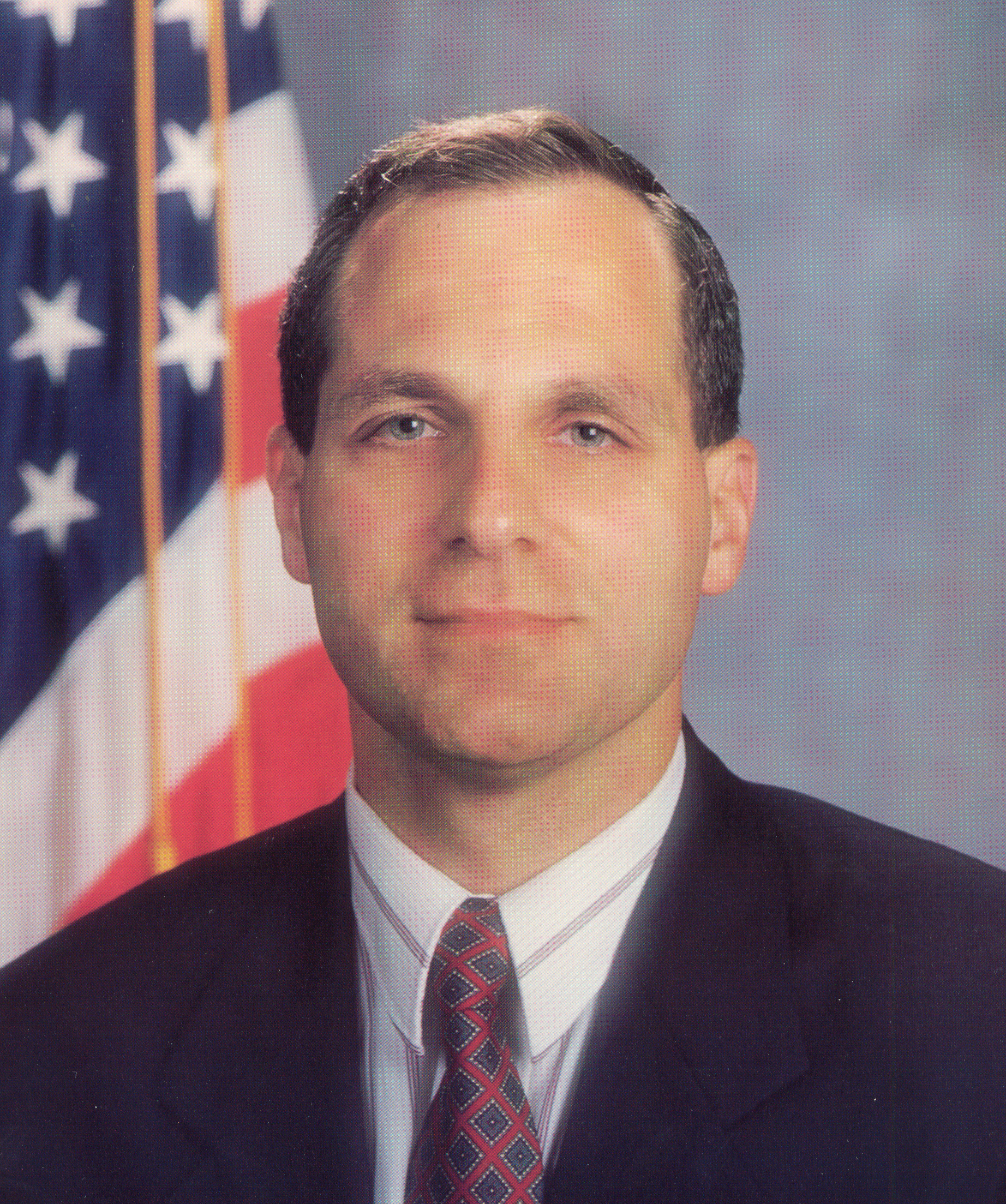
FBI Director Louis Freeh

- Sometime in September, FBI Director Louis Freeh recommended the Energy Department fire nuclear scientist Wen Ho Lee. They ignored his recommendation for 18 months.
- Attorney General Reno opened a criminal investigation into Loral Space & Communications and Hughes Electronics' illegal transfer of ballistic missile technology to China.

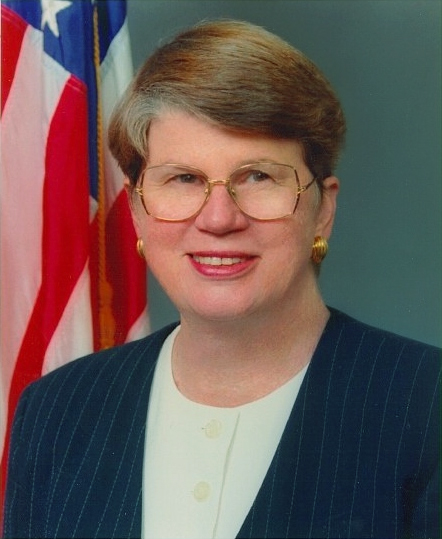
Attorney General Janet Reno

October

- On October 29, President Clinton certified that China was not engaging in the export of nuclear technology to non-nuclear nations, which allowed a 1985 Sino-U.S. nuclear cooperation agreement to go into effect in 1998. The agreement allowed for the shipping of nuclear power plant technology to China. "This agreement is a win-win," Clinton said. "It serves America's national security, environmental and economic interests… It is the right thing to do for America."

November

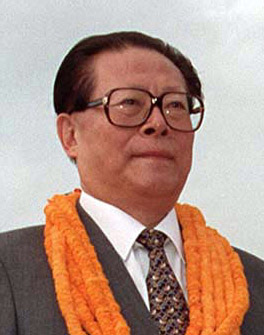
CCP General Secretary Jiang Zemin

- General Secretary of the Chinese Communist Party Jiang Zemin completed his tour of the United States with a November 2–3 visit to Los Angeles. While there, he toured Hughes Electronics' main headquarters and manufacturing plant. Hughes Electronics was fined $32 million in 2003 for illegally transferring missile technology to China in 1995.
- On November 7, 1997, Energy Secretary Federico Peña announced the department had taken actions to strengthen the safeguards and security at the department's defense nuclear facilities. In announcing the actions, Peña released two reports he said he had ordered earlier in the year on safeguards and security. "Several months ago when security concerns were first brought to my attention, I ordered these reports. Today, I am publicly releasing them because I think we have a responsibility to the American people to address these challenges as openly and directly as possible. More importantly, we are taking actions to further secure our facilities," Peña said.

== 1998 ==
February

- President Clinton authorized the sale to China of a Loral-made satellite sometime in February 1998. Justice Department prosecutors who were investigating the company for possible violations of export law regarding the February 1996 failed rocket launch in China opposed this. Loral was eventually fined $14 million in 2002 for its involvement in illegally transferring missile technology to China.
- Also in February, President Clinton issued a Presidential Decision Directive (PDD-61) that attempted to tighten security in all of the United States' weapons laboratories. The PDD also ordered the Department of Energy to establish a stronger counterintelligence program. The exact text of the PDD is unknown as it has never been publicly released, although one component of the PDD, relating to Technical Surveillance Countermeasures (TSCM), is reproduced on the website of the Federation of American Scientists.

June

- On June 18, the House of Representatives voted 409–10 to allow the creation of a special committee to investigate whether technology or information was transferred to the People's Republic of China that may have contributed to the enhancement of their nuclear-armed intercontinental ballistic missiles. The committee was named the Select Committee on U.S. National Security and Military/Commercial Concerns with the People's Republic of China.

October

- On October 17, President Clinton signed into law recently passed legislation by Congress that reversed his 1996 Executive Order that shifted control over commercial satellite exports permits from the State Department to the Commerce Department. After signing the bill, President Clinton stated the change was: "...not necessary... and could hamper the U.S. satellite industry." The legislation would not go into effect until five months later.

December

- On December 5, The New York Times reported the Justice Department was investigating the Central Intelligence Agency for possibly obstructing justice by giving Hughes Electronics information about the House Select Committee's investigation of the company.

== 1999 ==
January

- On January 3, the House Select Committee on U.S. National Security and Military/Commercial Concerns with the People's Republic of China released their classified report on their findings regarding China's espionage campaign against the United States to government officials in Congress and the White House.

March

- Sometime in March, Secretary of State Madeleine Albright and Vice President Al Gore learned of China's thefts of America's weapons designs for the first time.
- On March 6, The New York Times published an article entitled "China Stole Nuclear Secrets From Los Alamos, U.S. Officials Say". The article publicly detailed for the first time the government's belief China had stolen classified information on the W-88 nuclear warhead.
- The Energy Department fired nuclear scientist Wen Ho Lee on March 8, 1999. FBI Director Louis Freeh recommended Lee be fired 18 months earlier.
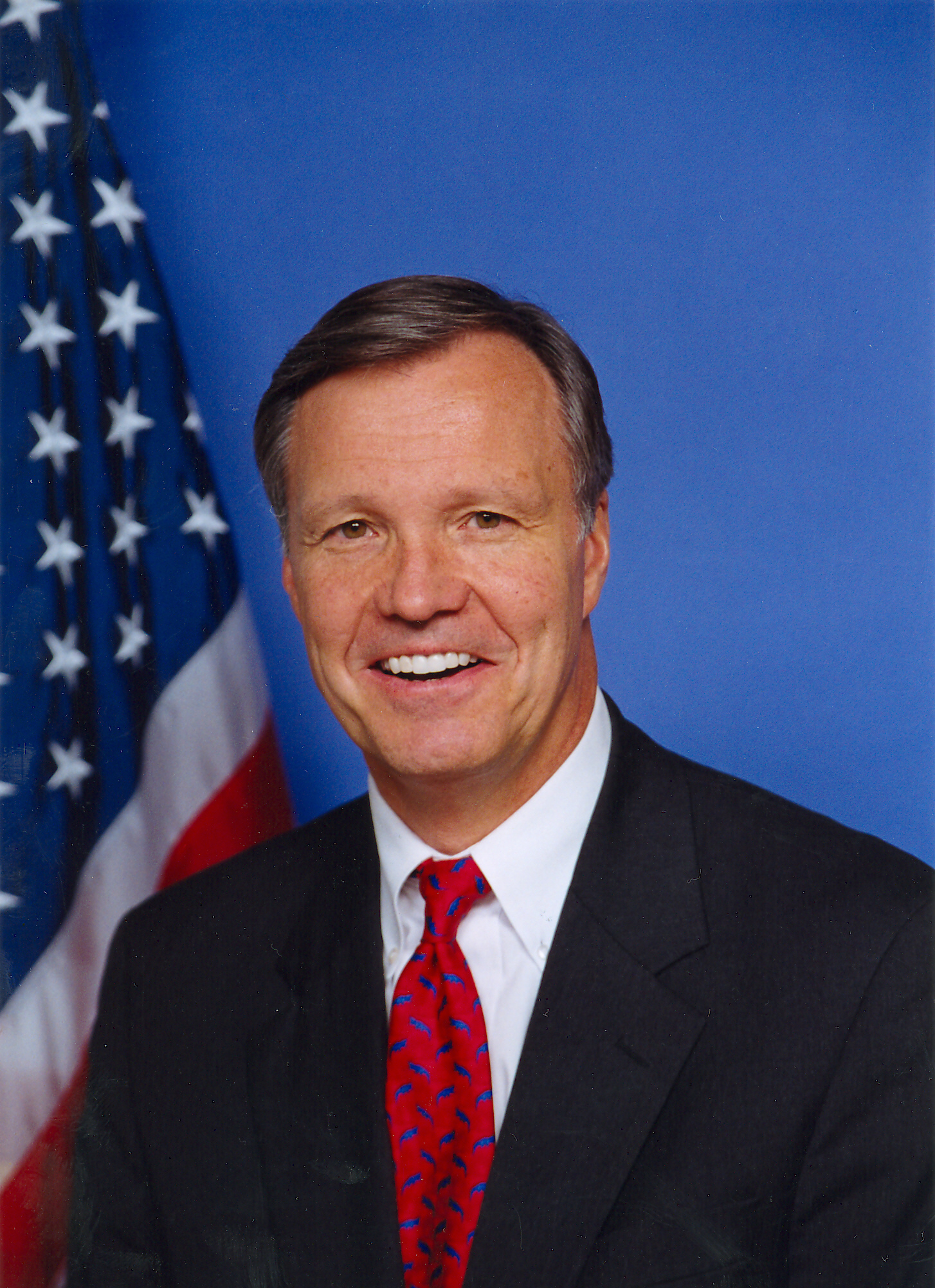
  U.S. Rep. Christopher Cox

May

- On May 25, the United States House of Representatives released the unanimously agreed upon Cox Report (AKA Report of the Select Committee on U.S. National Security and Military/Commercial Concerns with the People's Republic of China) which detailed publicly for the first time China's espionage campaign against the United States. The report was a redacted version of a still-classified report completed almost five months previously. President Clinton and his CIA determined 30 percent of the original report could not be released to the public.
- Excerpt from an interview with National Security Advisor Sandy Berger by Jim Lehrer of PBS May 27, 1999:

Lehrer: The main hit on you, as you know, Mr. Berger, is that you were told (about China's nuclear espionage) in April of 1996 and you didn't tell the president about it until, what, a year or so later, even longer than that? Berger: I was told in 1996, Jim, of the... at a briefing, of the evolution of China's strategic program, in two cases, one went back to 1979. The one that went that went to... involved in the mid-80's. I found that very troubling. I asked DOE... I acted in response to what I heard. I asked DOE to widen and deepen its investigation, to intensify as they were planning their counterintelligence efforts to brief the Congress[.] [W]ithin several weeks the FBI had opened up a full investigation on the prime suspect. So I took the actions that I believe were appropriate. I get an awful lot of threat information every day. I have to make a judgment as to what I brief the president on and what I don't. In 1997, when this was clearly a pattern and a systemic problem, I thought it was essential for the president to know.

December

In December 1999, four Stanford University professors release a report rebutting the Cox Commission, noting "The language of the report, particularly its Overview, was inflammatory and some allegations did not seem to be well supported....Some important and relevant facts are wrong and a number of conclusions are, in our view, unwarranted." A number of other reports, including one from the National Academy of Sciences, reach similar conclusions.
