= Ray Arthur Wang =

American actor

- Wang in 2007
- Education: University of California, Berkeley (BS); Stanford University (MS, PhD)
- Occupation(s): Director, producer

Ray Arthur Wang, born Raymond Wang (pronounced Wong), is an American independent filmmaker and electrical engineer.

== Personal life ==
Wang was born to a Taiwanese American family and was raised in Livermore, California, where he graduated from Livermore High School. In 1999, he earned his Bachelor of Science in electrical engineering and computer science with a minor in music from the University of California, Berkeley.

After receiving his bachelor's degree, Wang went on to earn his M.S. and Ph.D. in electrical engineering at Stanford University, where he researched wireless communication under the guidance of Donald C. Cox with the support of the National Science Foundation Fellowship and Stanford Graduate Fellowship (Ric Weiland Family Fellow).

== Film career ==
Wang pursued a career in electrical engineering but was increasingly moved by social injustices around him. He founded Raw Power Productions in 2004 with a mission of using the medium of film to effect social change.

His directorial feature debut Carma in 2005, starring actress Karen Black as the voice of a haunted Honda Accord, toured local film festivals. It won "Best Picture" and "Indie Auteur of the Year" for Wang at the Bare Bones International Film Festival. Carma premiered as a Special Presentation at Cinequest Film Festival under the name Compartment.

Wang and his team was invited to the Sundance Producers' Conference in 2006, where he was a producer on the women's rights documentary, Tapestries of Hope. The film was an early adopter of the crowdfunding site Indiegogo, which launched in 2008. The film featured activist Betty Makoni and discusses sexual abuse in Zimbabwe. It released 2010 nationwide in over 100 theaters.

The San Francisco Chronicle praised Wang's debut directorial The Profile for evoking memories of the infamous Wen Ho Lee case on its 10th anniversary. Film critic Richard von Busack also spoke positively on the film in the Metro Silicon Valley, while Film Threat stated, "The Profile feels timeless but is also clearly modern as we look at the recent illegal immigration laws enacted by Arizona."

His short When Sally Met Rascal... is about homelessness and starred Sally Kirkland and Rascal, former winner of the World's Ugliest Dog Contest.

In 2011, Wang released the 3D horror short Down Under to raise awareness about the 2008–2010 series of hate crimes against Indians in Australia.

His 2013 short Oksana tells the story of a 9-year-old white girl adopted by an Indian American man and American Indian (Native American) woman and is loosely based on the controversial subject of Russian adoptions in America.

In 2014, Wang completed the short Circle of Life, starring actors Graham Greene and Michael Horse, about the final years of human life. Wang collaborated with writer Susan Black for the fourth time in 2014 for Black and White.

His 2017 film Disk 44, an animated remake of The Profile,, placed 8th in the Stuttgart International Festival of Animated Film (ITFS) Amazon Audience Award.

== Music career ==
Wang started formal piano training at the age of five, shortly after his perfect pitch and ability to play by ear were noticed, and went on to win several piano competitions. Wang was invited to perform as piano soloist with symphony orchestras over ten times, starting at age ten when he won the Livermore-Amador Symphony's Concerto Competition. After a guest piano appearance with the Stanford Symphony Orchestra for the U.S. Premiere of Philip Glass' Songs of Milarepa in 1999, he then won the Stanford Concerto Competition in 2000, performing Rachmaninoff's 2nd Piano Concerto with them.

In 2006, The Oakland Tribune wrote in reference to his performance of Rachmaninoff's 3rd Piano Concerto, "Wang received the Diablo Symphony's most vociferous ovation ever." A year later, Wang retired from the classical piano concertizing scene to focus on film and engineering but continues to play piano and/or compose music for his movie scores. Wang's debut CD, RAW Encores, was released in December 2013.
