= Cox Report =

1999 report on Chinese covert operations in the United States in the 1980s and 90s

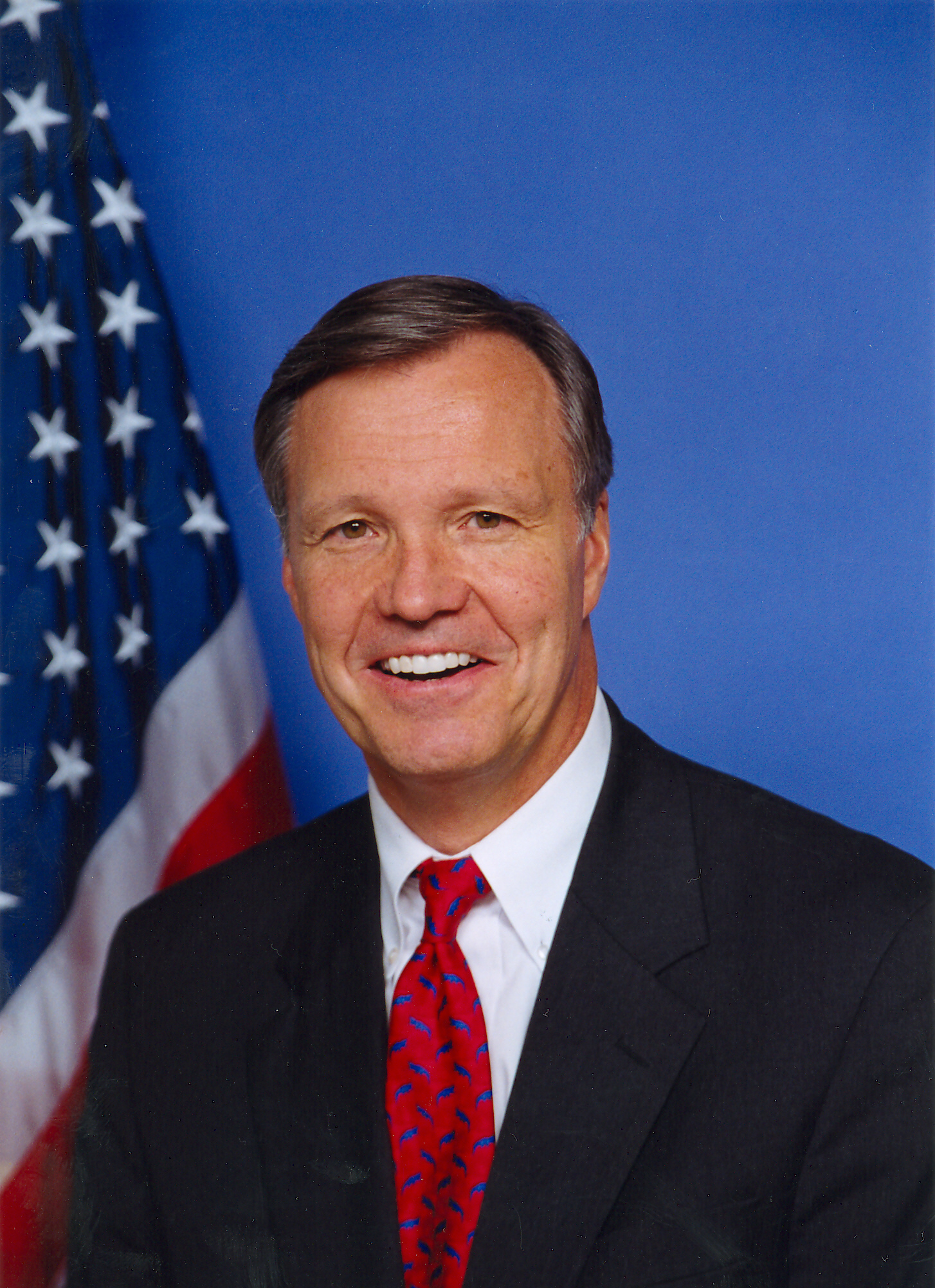
U.S. Representative Chris Cox (Republican-California) chaired the Committee that produced the report.

The Report of the Select Committee on U.S. National Security and Military/Commercial Concerns with the People's Republic of China, commonly known as the Cox Report after Representative Christopher Cox, is a classified U.S. government document reporting on the People's Republic of China's espionage operations within the United States during the 1980s and 1990s. The redacted version of the report was released to the public on May 25, 1999. The release of the redacted report was preceded by an intelligence community report which was more conservative in its allegations.

The Chinese government responded that the allegations were "groundless" and that it had already developed the necessary technologies prior to the alleged thefts. As part of its rebuttal, the Chinese government revealed that it had developed a neutron bomb in the 1980s.

Various academic critiques of the Cox Report exist. A group of Stanford University scientists analyzed the report, concluding that it was inflammatory, groundless in some instances, and had some important relevant facts wrong. Other academic analyses have noted that the chronology of China's development of comparable warheads contributes to refuting the Cox Report allegations or that alleged stolen secrets were in fact fairly basic information.

== Committee created by the U.S. House of Representatives ==
The report was the work product of the Select Committee on U.S. National Security and Military/Commercial Concerns with the People's Republic of China. This special committee, created by a 409–10 vote of the U.S. House of Representatives on June 18, 1998, was tasked with the responsibility of investigating whether technology or information was transferred to the People's Republic of China that may have contributed to the enhancement of the nuclear-armed intercontinental ballistic missiles or to the manufacture of weapons of mass destruction.

The committee released a classified version of its report in January 1999.

In anticipation of the forthcoming unclassified version of the Cox Report, United States President Bill Clinton ordered the United States intelligence bodies to review potential Chinese nuclear espionage. In April 1999, the USA released an unclassified version of the intelligence bodies' Damage Assessment Report. As academic Hui Zhang writes, the intelligence report was more cautious and nuanced than the Cox Report. Unlike the Cox Report, which alleged that China had stolen "weapons design information," the Damage Assessment Report asserted that China had taken "weapons design concepts", but acknowledged that the intelligence bodies "cannot determine the full extent of weapon information obtained. For example, we do not know whether any weapon design documentation or blueprints were acquired."

A similar investigation had already begun in the U.S. Senate under the leadership of Senator Fred Thompson (Republican-Tennessee). Thompson had opened his hearings on China's influence in America's 1996 presidential and congressional elections 11 months earlier (on July 8, 1997).

Majority	Minority
Christopher Cox, California, Chairman; Porter Goss, Florida, Vice Chairman; Doug Bereuter, Nebraska; James V. Hansen, Utah; Curt Weldon, Pennsylvania	Norm Dicks, Washington, Ranking Member; John Spratt, South Carolina; Lucille Roybal-Allard, California; Bobby Scott, Virginia

The Chairman of the committee was Republican Rep. Christopher Cox of California, whose name became synonymous with the committee's final report. Four other Republicans and Democrats served on the panel, including Representative Norm Dicks, who served as the ranking Democratic member. The committee's final report was approved unanimously by all 9 members. The redacted version of the report was released to the public May 25, 1999.

== Major allegations ==
The Cox Report alleged that China had "stolen design information on the United States' most advanced thermonuclear weapons[,]" the W-88, W-87, W-78, W-76, W-70, W-62, and W-56. It focused particularly on the question of the W-88 and the W-70 (the neutron bomb).

Regarding the W-88, the allegations were primarily based on information provided by a Chinese walk-in to the American Institute in Taiwan. The walk-in was described as having provided a classified PRC document with classified design information related to the W-88 and technical information related to other warheads. According to the CIA, the walk-in had been directed to provide the documents by PRC intelligence. Writing in 2025, academic Hui Zhang states that the walk-in's intentions have never explained. According to the Cox Report, the alleged theft of W-88 information occurred between 1984 and 1992.

The Cox Report contended that the theft of information regarding the W-62, W-76, W-78, and W-87 occurred prior to 1995.

== Reactions ==
=== U.S. Government ===
The Cox Report's release prompted major legislative and administrative reforms. More than two dozen of the Select Committee's recommendations were enacted into law, including the creation of a new National Nuclear Security Administration to take over the nuclear weapons security responsibilities of the United States Department of Energy. At the same time, no person has ever been convicted of providing nuclear information to the PRC, and the one case that was brought in connection to these charges, that of Wen Ho Lee, fell apart. Some U.S. intelligence agents believed that Lee, an employee of Los Alamos National Laboratory, had leaked information to China, but years of investigation failed to connect Lee to any espionage. Lee pleaded guilty to mishandling restricted data but was then exonerated and the judge apologized to Lee for the unfair way in which he had been treated.

In response to the allegations contained in the report, the CIA appointed retired U.S. Navy Admiral David E. Jeremiah to review and assess the report's findings. In April 1999, Admiral Jeremiah released a report backing up the Cox Report's main allegation that stolen information had been used to develop or modernize Chinese missiles and/or warheads.

=== China ===
The Chinese government called all allegations "groundless." It stated:

The structure, size, weight, shape, and circular error probability, as well as the service time, of seven U.S. nuclear warheads, including the W-88, listed in the Cox Report, in fact, can be found in many open documents and on the Internet. They are not at all secret. People with general scientific knowledge understand that nuclear weapons cannot developed simply by relying on such data.

As part of its rebuttal to the claim that it had stolen information on an American neutron bomb, China revealed that it had already fully developed neutron bomb technology in the 1980s, having started its neutron bomb program in 1977.

Director of the China Academy of Engineering Physics (CAEP) Hu Side stated, "With regard to the level of our nuclear weapon development, we do not need anything from the U.S. What the U.S. did for us and the whole world was to prove that atomic and thermonuclear weapons worked. That is what you gave us and everyone else. That was the main secret you gave away. Everything else we did on our own." According to Hu,

We did not come to the idea of those sophisticated primaries from [the U.S.]. This was the only logical way to reduce the diameter of a nuclear weapon to fit it into smaller diameter reentry vehicles for the next generation of nuclear warheads as well as third-generation weapons in particular.

=== Academia ===
An assessment report that was published by Stanford University's Center for International Security and Cooperation said that the language of the Cox report "was inflammatory and some allegations did not seem to be well supported." The Stanford Report noted that in the Cox Report, "[s]ome important and relevant facts are wrong," among them the assertion that China had stolen classified design information for a neutron bomb, which no nation had yet deployed. In fact, the United States had produced neutron bombs and they were stockpiled at the time of the report. W.K.F. Panofsky observed the United States had discontinued such weapons "after it was broadly determined that such systems lacked military utility." More broadly, Panofsky wrote, "Essentially all nations in the world operate intelligence agencies whose goal is, among others, to collect information from other nations which those nations wish to protect from disclosure. The United States supports by far the largest intelligence-collection effort among the countries of the world." According to Panofsky:

It is extremely improbable that a foreign country would or even could copy a specific design for which partial information was obtained through espionage but where no actual drawings or prints were acquired. Rather, it is plausible that, if motivated, China could improve its existing design by employing similar basic design ideas and principles with this information.

Richard L. Garwin remarked that stolen information regarding the W-70 and W-88 warhead would not appear to directly impair U.S. national security since to develop weapons based on this technology would require a massive investment in resources and not be in their best strategic interests with regard to their nuclear program.

A group of Los Alamos National Laboratory scientists re-examined the documents brought by a Chinese walk-in to the American Institute in Taiwan. The walk-in's documents had been the major basis of the Cox Report's contentions regarding the W-88. The group that re-examined the documents concluded that they were "specifications intended for the manufactures of re-entry vehicles, not weapons designers" and that the alleged "secrets" therein were in fact "fairly basic."

Comparing the history of comparable Chinese warheads, academic Hui Zhang concludes that the chronology of the development of Chinese warheads 535 and 5X5 and the comparable American warheads "goes a long way toward a refutation of the Cox Report". For example, the idea of a gas-boosted primary had been mastered by Chinese scientists years before the alleged theft of such data from the United States, and had been proposed as a concept by Edward Teller in 1947. Additionally, he writes that Yu Min had determined the technical approach to neutron design by 1978 (predating what the Cox Report had regarded as key evidence) based on information collected through news reports and had already planned an approach to its neutron bomb development. Zhang also concludes:

[I]n the end, based on publicly-available information, we cannot determine which ideas, if any, China may have acquired from intelligence collected on U.S. programs. It does seem clear, however, that even if some ideas came from abroad, Chinese experts had to do the majority of the calculations and engineering themselves.

=== Related prosecutions ===
Two of the U.S. companies named in the report – Loral Space and Communications Corp. and Hughes Electronics Corp. – were later successfully prosecuted by the federal government for violations of U.S. export control law, resulting in the two largest fines in the history of the Arms Export Control Act. Loral paid a $14 million fine in 2002, and Hughes paid a $32 million fine in 2003.

== Timeline ==
- June 1995, "Walk-in" agent gives CIA officers classified Chinese document detailing American nuclear designs.
- July 1995, CIA director, Energy Secretary, and chief of staff learn of nuclear espionage for first time.
- October 31, 1995, FBI agents learn of nuclear thefts.
- November 1995, National Security Advisor to the President learns of Chinese nuclear espionage.
- Late 1995, Energy Dept. agents discover theft of nuclear designs while analyzing nuclear tests by China.
- April 1996, Assist. National Security Advisor, Defense Sec., Attorney General, FBI director learn of nuclear thefts.
- July 1997, President learns of Chinese nuclear espionage from National Security Advisor.
- December 1999, four Stanford University professors release a report rebutting the Cox Commission, noting that "...facts are wrong and a number of conclusions are, in our view, unwarranted."
