= Wen Ho Lee =

Taiwanese-American scientist and convicted felon (born 1939)

- 李文和
- Born: December 21, 1939 (age 86); Nantō, Taichū Prefecture, Taiwan, Empire of Japan (modern-day Nantou City, Taiwan)
- Education: National Cheng Kung University (BS); Texas A&M University (MS, PhD)
- Known for: Mathematical work in nuclear explosion and in fluid dynamics, pleaded guilty to felony count of illegal retention of national defense information
- Spouse(s): Sylvia F. Wen (Chinese: 文飛洋; born December 8, 1943)
- Scientific career
- Fields: Nuclear physics
- Workplaces: Los Alamos National Laboratory; Texas A&M University; University of California
- Doctoral advisor: C. F. Kettleborough

Chinese name
- Chinese: 李文和
Transcriptions
Standard Mandarin
- Hanyu Pinyin: Lǐ Wénhé
- Wade–Giles: Li^{3} Wen^{2}-ho^{2}
- IPA: [lì wə̌nxɤ̌]
Southern Min
- Hokkien POJ: Lí Bûn-hô

Wen Ho Lee (Chinese: 李文和; pinyin: Lǐ Wénhé; born December 21, 1939) is a Taiwanese-American nuclear scientist and mechanical engineer who worked for the University of California at the Los Alamos National Laboratory in New Mexico. He created computerized simulations of nuclear explosions for the purposes of scientific inquiry, as well as for improving the safety and reliability of the U.S. nuclear arsenal.

A federal grand jury indicted him on charges of stealing secrets about the U.S. nuclear arsenal for the People's Republic of China (PRC) in December 1999. After federal investigators were unable to prove these initial accusations, the government conducted a separate investigation. Ultimately it charged Lee only with improper handling of restricted data, one of the original 59 indictment counts, a felony count. He pleaded guilty as part of a plea settlement.

Lee filed a civil suit that was settled. In June 2006, he received $1.6 million from the federal government and five media organizations as part of a settlement for leaking his name to the press before any charges had been filed against him.

Federal judge James A. Parker eventually apologized to Lee for denying him bail and putting him in solitary confinement. He excoriated the government for misconduct and misrepresentations to the court.

== Early life ==
Wen Ho Lee was born on December 21, 1939, to a Hoklo family in Taiwan during Japanese rule. He graduated from Keelung High School in the northern part of the island in 1959, after which he attended National Cheng Kung University in Tainan, where he graduated with a Bachelor of Science in mechanical engineering in 1963.

In My Country Versus Me, Lee describes life as being harsh. His father died when Lee was very young. His mother suffered from asthma and eventually committed suicide so that she would not 'burden' the family. He was a young boy in Taiwan when Republic of China (ROC) forces violently suppressed the February 28 Incident of 1947. Taiwan was placed under martial law; his brother died when he was a conscript and his commanding officers allegedly would not allow him to take medicine. Lee overcame steep odds. He had what he describes as a wonderful teacher in the 6th grade who encouraged his intellectual abilities. Eventually, he made his way to university, where he became interested in fluid dynamics and studied mechanical engineering.

== Graduate education and career ==
Lee came to the United States in 1965 to continue his studies in mechanical engineering at Texas A&M University. He received his doctorate in mechanical engineering with specialization in fluid mechanics in 1969 and was naturalized as a U.S. citizen in 1974.

He was employed at industrial and government research firms before he moved to New Mexico in 1978. He worked as a scientist in weapons design at Los Alamos National Laboratory, in applied mathematics and fluid dynamics, from that year until 1999. He created simulation software for nuclear explosions, which were used to gain scientific understanding and help maintain the safety and reliability of the US nuclear weapons arsenal.

== Government investigation ==
Lee was publicly named by United States Department of Energy officials, including Secretary of Energy Bill Richardson, as a suspect in the theft of classified nuclear-related documents from Los Alamos. Richardson was criticized by the Senate for his handling of the espionage inquiry because he had not testified sooner before Congress. Richardson was less than truthful in his response by saying that he was waiting to uncover more information before speaking to Congress.

On December 10, 1999, Lee was arrested, indicted on 59 counts, and jailed in solitary confinement without bail for 278 days. On September 13, 2000, he accepted a plea bargain from the federal government. Lee was released on time served after the government's case against him could not be proven. Part of his defense rested on a graymail strategy, which tried to compel prosecutors to release large amounts of classified material related to nuclear weapons. He was ultimately charged only with one count of mishandling sensitive documents, which did not require pre-trial solitary confinement. The other 58 counts were dropped.

President Bill Clinton issued a public apology to Lee over his treatment by the federal government during the investigation. Lee filed a civil lawsuit to gain the names of public officials who had leaked his name to journalists before charges had been filed against him. It raised issues, similar to those in the Valerie Plame affair, of whether journalists should have to reveal their anonymous sources in a court of law.

Lee's lawsuit was settled by the federal government in 2006 just before the Supreme Court was set to decide whether to hear the case. The federal judge who heard the case during an earlier appeal said that "top decision makers in the executive branch...have embarrassed our entire nation and each of us who is a citizen."

=== Operation Kindred Spirit ===
After an intelligence agent from the People's Republic of China (PRC) gave U.S. agents papers which indicated that they knew the design of a particularly modern U.S. nuclear warhead (the W-88), the Federal Bureau of Investigation (FBI) started an investigation codenamed "Operation Kindred Spirit" to look into how China could have obtained that design.

In 1982, Lee was recorded on a wiretap speaking with another Taiwanese-American scientist who had been accused of espionage. Lee offered to the scientist to find out who had turned him in. When confronted by the FBI about this incident, Lee said he did not know the scientist, until the FBI demonstrated proof of the conversation. Despite some evidence that could have kept the case open, the FBI closed this file on Lee in 1984.

Lee did not get the attention of the FBI again for 12 years until 1998. The FBI had lost the file on Lee from the 1983 and 1984 meetings with him, and had to reconstruct the information. In 1994, a delegation of Chinese scientists visited Los Alamos National Laboratory in an unannounced capacity for a meeting. One of the scientists visiting was Dr. Hu Side, the head of the Chinese Academy of Engineering Physics. He also was credited with the design of the small, W88-like weapon. However, despite the visit being unannounced, Lee showed up to the meeting uninvited.

This alarmed LANL officials who contacted the FBI, which opened up another investigation of Lee. On December 23, 1998, Lee was given a polygraph test by Wackenhut, a DOE contractor. He was not told of the reason why, other than that it involved his latest trip to China to escort his nephew. During the questioning, he admitted that he had, in fact, met with Side in a hotel room in 1988 and that Hu had asked him for classified information, which he refused to discuss.

Lee admitted that he failed to report this contact and approach by individuals requesting classified information as required by security regulations. He was told that he passed the test, but was stripped of his Q clearance to the LANL's classified X Division section. Although he questioned the action against him, Lee went along, deleting the classified information he held on his computers, and moved to the T (unclassified) clearance zone. He was later subjected to three more polygraph tests before being told by the FBI agents that re-evaluation of the test results showed that Lee had failed all of them.

In January, The Wall Street Journal ran an article on the investigation, headlined "China Got Secret Data on U.S. Warhead -- Chief Suspect Is a Scientist at Weapons Laboratory of Energy Department," without naming a suspect. On March 6, The New York Times published an article on the W-88 case, "China Stole Nuclear Secrets for Bombs, U.S. Aides Say," again without naming the suspect. Government officials had requested the newspaper delay publication, and The New York Times held back publication for one day, saying it would consider a further delay if asked personally by the FBI director, who did not act on the request.

The FBI interviewed Lee on March 5, and he consented to a search of his office. On March 8, 1999, Lee was fired from his job at Los Alamos National Laboratory for failure to maintain classified information securely. However, FBI investigators soon determined that the design data the PRC had obtained could not have come from the Los Alamos Lab, because it contained information that only a "downstream" contractor involved in the final warhead production process would have. This information was only created after the weapon design left the LANL.

Even though this left Lee apparently in the clear, the FBI continued its attempt to find evidence to implicate Lee in committing espionage for the PRC. There were 60 agents and more assigned to Lee's case, working to prove that he was a spy. The FBI conducted a search of Lee's house on April 10, seizing any item related to computers or computing, as well as anything that had notations written in Chinese. The FBI and the Department of Energy then decided to conduct a full forensic examination of Lee's office computer. The examination of Lee's computer determined that he had backed up his work files, which were restricted though not classified, onto tapes, and had also transferred these files from a system used for processing classified data onto another, also secure, system designated for unclassified data.

After the FBI discovered Lee's transfer, they revoked his badge access and clearance, including his ability to access the data from the unclassified but secure network. Lee then requested from a colleague in another part of Los Alamos to be allowed to use his computer, at which time he transferred the data to a third unclassified computer network. The government then retroactively redesignated the data Lee had copied, changing it from its former designation of "PARD" (Protect As Restricted Data), which was just above the "Unclassified" designation and contained 99 percent unclassified data, to a new designation of "Secret" (which was treated on a higher security level than PARD), giving them the crime that the government needed for a formal charge.

== Indictment, imprisonment and release ==
The Department of Justice constructed its case around the only real evidence of malfeasance, the downloading of the restricted information. It ultimately employed an unusual strategy of trying to prove that in addition to illegally handling information, Lee had an "intent to injure" the United States by denying it the exclusivity of the nuclear information. Lee was indicted on 59 counts, 39 of which were for mishandling information under the Atomic Energy Act of 1954, and 20 of which were for lesser violations of the Espionage Act. (The original Atomic Energy Act, also known as the McMahon Act, was passed in response to the case of Cambridge physicist Alan Nunn May after he confessed to giving Manhattan Project secrets to the USSR.) Janet Reno confirmed with CIA Director George Tenet and FBI Director Louis Freeh that if the presiding judge rules that the government must reveal in open court what specifically was on the tapes, the prosecution would have to plea out the case or risk jeopardizing state secrets.

Lee spent nine months incarcerated in solitary confinement with limited access to family. His treatment, which included constant shackling, was inconsistent with treatment of other prisoners at the Santa Fe County detention facility, and became a source of great controversy for the DOJ. In September 2000, Judge Parker ruled that the government was required to disclose the information on the tapes. According to Louis Freeh and Janet Reno, they were left with no option but to plea out Lee in order to find out where the missing tapes were, and not risk sensitive government information by bringing it to trial. Lee was freed, and at plea admitted to having made copies of the tapes which he later destroyed, according to his book My Country Versus Me, and other sources.

Lee pleaded guilty to one felony count of illegal "retention" of "national defense information". In return, the government released him from jail and dropped the other 58 counts against him. Judge Parker apologized to Lee for the unfair manner in which he was treated. The judge also regretted being misled by the executive branch into ordering Lee's detention, stating that he was led astray by the Department of Justice, by its FBI, and by its United States attorney. He formally denounced the government for abuse of power in its prosecution of the case. Later, President Bill Clinton remarked that he had been "troubled" by the way Lee was treated.

== Post-release ==
Lee is now retired and lives in Albuquerque, New Mexico with his wife. He also has two adult children – a son, and a daughter, Alberta, who at one time was an intern at Los Alamos Laboratory. In 2000, Alberta expressed her intention to become a civil rights lawyer to defend others as she had been a spokeswoman for her father. In 2003, he wrote a memoir, My Country Versus Me, in which he describes his love of classical music, literature, poetry, fishing in the mountains of New Mexico, and his dedication to organic gardening. He also charges that his Asian ethnicity was a primary factor behind his prosecution by the government. As evidence of such racial profiling, he cited cases of several scientists of non-Han Chinese ancestry who were responsible for similar security transgressions but were able to continue their careers. Former FBI Director Louis Freeh categorically denied these charges.

Lee was compensated with a $1.6 million settlement from the U.S. federal government and five news organizations for privacy violations. A condition of the United States portion of the settlement, $895,000, is that it is to be applied only to lawyers' fees and the taxes on the media's payments, since the government insisted that they would not pay anything that would be perceived as damages to Lee.

He has published an applied physics textbook that he started writing while still in prison.

== In media ==
The 2001 play The Legacy Codes, by American playwright Cherylene Lee, deals with the Lee case.

The short story "Amnesty" in the 2005 edition of Octavia Butler's collection Bloodchild and Other Stories was inspired by the government's treatment of Lee.

The 2007 play Yellow Face by Asian-American playwright David Henry Hwang places this incident in the context of a greater number of cases dealing with racial profiling against Asian Americans, particularly the Chinese during the 1990s.

The 2010 short film The Profile and its animated remake (the 2017 short film Disk 44), both by American filmmaker Ray Arthur Wang, were inspired by the Lee case.

== See also ==
- Cox Report
- Espionage Act of 1917
- List of Chinese spy cases in the United States
- List of The New York Times controversies § Los Alamos investigation
- Ministry of State Security (China)
- People's Liberation Army
- Stephen Jin-Woo Kim
- Thomas A. Drake
- Timeline of the Cox Report controversy
