= AIDS Awareness Week =

Week when extra effort is made to raise awareness of AIDS

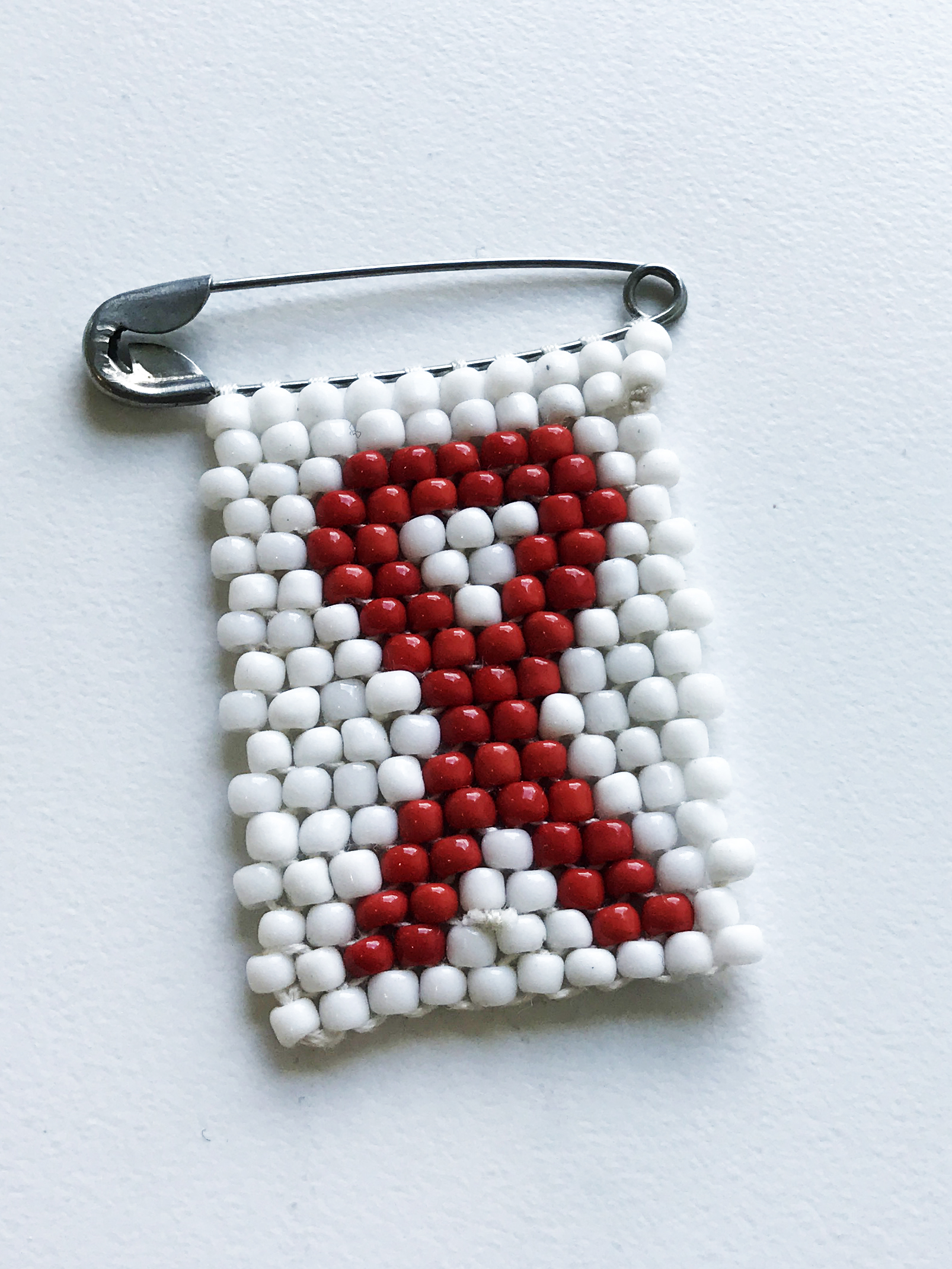
AIDS awareness pin

AIDS Awareness Week is observed in the United States during the last week of November in an effort to raise AIDS awareness.

== History ==
In 1984 Dianne Feinstein, then mayor of San Francisco, declared the first AIDS Awareness Week. The first AIDS Awareness Week took place in San Francisco with a goal of educating staff and students from San Francisco Community College about AIDS. This goal involves informing people about causes, effects, symptoms of AIDS, as well as prevention methods. In the same year, in Toronto, ACT held an AIDS Awareness Week, following on form New York's Aid AIDS Week.

Spreading awareness about AIDS also began to take place in other locations. Across Canada AIDS Awareness Week is the last week in November. In 2002, the Canadian Public Health Association (CPHA) led a bilingual campaign for their awareness week from 24 November – 1 December 2002. This campaign was centered on ending the stigma and discrimination against people who have HIV/AIDS. They also worked to inform people about preventive care against HIV. In addition, they provided the community with free resources and items to further help spread awareness to others.

In 1991 the US President declared, in Proclamation 6305, that 10–16 June was to be Pediatric AIDS Awareness Week. At this time over 157,525 people had AIDS in the United States. About 2,734 of these people were children 13 years old and younger.

Aboriginal AIDS Awareness Week (AAAW) has been extant in Canada since 1998. It began in Vancouver, but now it takes place all throughout Canada. AAAW begins on World AIDS Day, 1 December, and runs until 5 or 6 December.

[World] AIDS Awareness Week is held in Perth, Australia.

Latterly some organizations have used the name "HIV/AIDS Awareness Week".

== Goals ==
The goal of Aboriginal AIDS Awareness Week is getting to zero. Despite different methods used by aboriginal communities to try to decrease the prevalence of AIDS, populations like the First Nation tribes in Saskatchewan in Canada, have about 3.5 times more cases of AIDS than other areas in Canada, as well as higher than most third world countries.

World AIDS Day was developed to bring awareness to the issue of AIDS in countries all around the globe and recognize the success and the steady decrease in AIDS diagnoses throughout the years. UNAIDS believes solutions need to be long-term, rather than short-term responses. Therefore, the goal is to look at prevention of HIV as well and World AIDS Day is a time to emphasize this and support people with AIDS, even though people are living with AIDS year-round. It is also a time to honor the people who lost their lives due to AIDS.

== Other observances ==
Aids Awareness Month has been declared in various countries. Also World Aids Day is an international UN sponsored observance.

The US government, in the form of hiv.gov, presents an all-year-round diversity Awareness Calendar, as of 2025:

- National Black HIV/AIDS Awareness Day – 7 February
- HIV Is Not A Crime Awareness Day – 28 February
- National Women and Girls HIV/AIDS Awareness Day – 10 March
- National Native HIV/AIDS Awareness Day – 20 March
- National Youth HIV & AIDS Awareness Day – 10 April
- National Transgender HIV Testing Day – 18 April
- HIV Vaccine Awareness Day – 18 May
- National Asian & Pacific Islander HIV/AIDS Awareness Day – 19 May
- Hepatitis Testing Day – 19 May
- HIV Long-Term Survivors Day – 5 June
- National HIV Testing Day – 27 June
- Zero HIV Stigma Day – 21 July
- Southern HIV/AIDS Awareness Day – 20 August
- National Faith HIV/AIDS Awareness Day – 25 August
- National African Immigrants and Refugee HIV and Hepatitis Awareness Day – 9 September
- National HIV/AIDS and Aging Awareness Day – 18 September
- National Gay Men's HIV/AIDS Awareness Day – 27 September
- National Latino AIDS Awareness Day – 15 October
- World AIDS Day – 1 December
