= Tapestries of Hope =

2009 film

Tapestries of Hope is a feature-length documentary that exposes the virgin cleansing myth that if a man rapes a virgin he will be cured of HIV/AIDS. The film focuses on the work human rights activist Betty Makoni has done to protect and re-empower girls who have been victimized through sexual abuse. Tapestries of Hope aims to bring awareness to the widespread abuse of women and girls as well as the efforts of the Girl Child Network and its founder, Betty Makoni.

The film is directed by Michealene Cristini Risley, written by Susan Black and Michealene Cristini Risley, and produced by Michealene Cristini Risley, Susan Black, Christopher Bankston, Anand Chandrasekaran, and Ray Arthur Wang. Tapestries of Hope was theatrically released September 28, 2010 in over 100 theaters across the U.S.

== Plot ==
Director Michealene Cristini Risley traveled to Zimbabwe to explore the rape and AIDS crisis in the country. She had previously befriended Betty Makoni, a born and raised Zimbabwean, and got to know about Makoni's organization, The Girl Child Network, which aims to empower the girls in Zimbabwe to stand up for their rights and also to provide a network as protection for these girls.

The stories were told by the girls of Zimbabwe and Makoni was the main cast for this film. Throughout the film, it was shown how Makoni has helped the girls in finding their voice and speaks out on the atrocities they have experienced. Risley and her crew were arrested and incarcerated shortly after shooting 22 hours of footage in Zimbabwe. The film was also seized by the Zimbabwean Intelligence Office at one time. However, the team managed to retrieve the footage and left Zimbabwe shortly after.

Betty Makoni was named one of the Top 10 CNN Heroes in 2009.

== Awards ==
- 2010 Monaco Film Festival Special Mention for "Inspiration and Strong Message"
- 2010 The Directors Guild of America, Directors Finder Series
- 2009 WIFTS Best Documentary
- 2009 Honolulu International Film Festival – “Aloha Accolade” Award for Excellence in Filmmaking – Documentary
- 2009 Accolade Film Awards 2009, Award of Merit
- 2009 Louisville International Festival of Film, Best Documentary
- 2009 The Indie Fest, Award of Excellence
- 2008 Amnesty International’s Ginetta Sagan Award for Women’s and Children’s Rights – Betty Makoni
- 2007 Junior Chamber International (JCI) Outstanding Young Persons of the World – Betty Makoni
- 2007 Society for New Communications Research Media blog of the year – https://savehope.blogspot.com/

== See also ==
- Virgin cleansing myth

== General references ==
- https://www.imdb.com/title/tt1109523/
- http://www.indiegogo.com/project/view/117
- http://us.oneworld.net/places/zimbabwe/-/article/betty-makoni
