= Virgin cleansing myth =

Belief that having sex with a virgin girl cures a man of HIV/AIDS or other STDs

The virgin cleansing myth (also referred to as the virgin cure myth, virgin rape myth, or simply virgin myth) is the belief that having sex with a virgin girl cures a man of HIV/AIDS or other sexually transmitted diseases.

Anthropologist Suzanne Leclerc-Madlala says the myth is a potential factor in infant rape by HIV-positive men in South Africa. In addition to young girls, who are presumed to be virgins because of their age, people who are "blind, deaf, physically impaired, intellectually disabled, or who have mental-health disabilities" are sometimes raped under the erroneous presumption that individuals with disabilities are sexually inactive and therefore virgins.

== Prevalence ==
People all over the world have heard this myth, including in sub-Saharan Africa, Asia, Europe and the Americas.

A survey by the University of South Africa (UNISA) in South Africa found that 18 percent of laborers thought that having sex with a virgin cures HIV/AIDS. An earlier study in 1999 by sexual health educators in Gauteng reported that 32 percent of the survey participants believed the myth.

According to Betty Makoni of the Girl Child Network in Zimbabwe, the myth is perpetuated by traditional healers advising HIV-positive men to cure their disease by having sex with virgin girls. In Zimbabwe, some people also believe that the blood produced by raping a virgin will cleanse the infected person's blood of the disease.

In 2002, psychologist Mike Earl-Taylor wrote that the virgin cure myth may explain the staggering rise in child or infant rapes in South Africa, which is facing an HIV/AIDS epidemic. UNICEF has attributed the rape of hundreds of girls to the virgin cleansing myth.

In South Africa, men take advantage of women with disabilities as they believe they are virgins.

However, it is unknown exactly how common the myth is and to what degree rapes happen because of the belief in it. The claim that the myth drives either HIV infection or child sexual abuse in Africa is disputed by researchers Rachel Jewkes and Helen Epstein, as well as by research on convicted sex offenders in Malawi, where no evidence was found to support the idea that the virgin cleansing myth prompted any rapes.

== Importance of education ==
Ignorance with regards to HIV and AIDS infection serves as a barrier to prevention in numerous African nations.

Education has helped women such as Betty Makoni speak out against the myth and attempt to dissuade people from believing the virgin cleansing myth.

According to UNICEF, culture-based gender roles that prize innocence and ignorance in girls and that accept sexual licentiousness in men promote this myth. Girls may be forced to marry older men, which can increase the likelihood of HIV transmission to girls. The stigma attached to AIDS also stops many people from seeking information or health services to shield their status, contributing to further transmission.

== In popular culture ==
The virgin cleansing myth is referenced in the Broadway musical The Book of Mormon. The minor character Matumbo is stopped from raping a baby based on the belief that sex with a virgin will cure his AIDS. During the song "Making Things Up Again", Elder Cunningham tells Matumbo that raping babies is against God's will, and invents a passage in the Book of Mormon in which God tells Joseph Smith to instead have sex with a frog to cure his AIDS.

== See also ==
- Droit du seigneur, an alleged legal right of European feudal lords to have sex with a subordinate woman, particularly on her wedding night
- Madonna–whore complex
- Sexual violence in South Africa
- Sexual cleansing
- Shunamitism
- Tapestries of Hope
