= Cost of HIV treatment =

The cost of HIV treatment is a complicated issue with an extremely wide range of costs due to varying factors such as the type of antiretroviral therapy and the country in which the treatment is administered. The first line therapy of HIV, or the initial antiretroviral drug regimen for an HIV-infected patient, is generally cheaper than subsequent second-line or third-line therapies. There is also a great variability of drug prices among low, middle, and high income countries. In general, low-income countries have the lowest cost of antiretroviral therapy, while middle- and high-income tend to have considerably higher costs. Certain prices of HIV drugs may be high and difficult to afford due to patent barriers on antiretroviral drugs and slow regulatory approval for drugs, which may lead to indirect consequences such as greater HIV drug resistance and an increased number of opportunistic infections. Government and activist movements have taken efforts to limit the price of HIV drugs.

In 2019 the government of India reported that it was supplying 2/3 of drugs for HIV treatment.

== Antiretroviral treatment costs ==
Drug companies market their antiretroviral drugs at different prices depending the type of drug and the target consumers. The cost of HIV treatment for first-line therapy has generally been lowest due to the availability of generic drugs designed for such treatment. If patients develop complications or resistance to first line therapy drugs, they may need to proceed to second-line or third-line therapy to successfully limit the HIV infection. Because there is a smaller market for such drug treatments, patients must often rely on considerably more expensive originators, or brand name drugs that were first approved for the market, to receive sufficient treatment. The costs of HIV treatment also tend to be cheaper in low-income countries as opposed to middle- and high-income countries, which may be attributed to the differences in price deals between governments and HIV drug companies. Low, middle, and high income countries are categorized according to the World Bank Atlas method, in which low-income countries had a GNI (gross national income) per capita of $995 or less in 2017, lower middle-income countries had a GNI per capita ranging from $996 to $3,895, upper middle-income countries had a GNI per capita ranging from $3,896 and $12,055, and high-income countries had a GNI per capita greater than or equal to $12,056.

=== First-line treatment ===
The first-line treatment is generally given to patients as an initial antiretroviral therapy and is the cheapest of the stages of treatments. The first-line antiretroviral drug treatment as recommended by the World Health Organization (WHO) involves TDF (tenofovir), 3TC (lamivudine) or FTC (emtricitabine), and EFV (efavirenz) or dolutegravir (DTG).

==== Low-income countries ====
There have been considerable reductions in the prices of first-line treatments over several years in low-income countries, which may be due to the increased market competition among producers driving them to bring generic drug prices down. The President's Emergency Plan for AIDS Relief (PEPFAR), a US government initiative concentrated on curbing HIV infections in low-income, developing nations, estimated that first-line antiretroviral drug prices were reduced by 15% from 2004 to 2009 for their programs. In 2014, PEPFAR calculated the estimated mean total cost per patient-year of treatment in the programs, including financial and in-kind contributions from all sources (including partner governments and other bilateral and multilateral donors), is $757 and that in low-income and lower middle-income countries, the mean cost per patient year of treatment when taking into account all sources of support is $645. PEPFAR calculated that their share of the cost for first-line treatment was $286 per patient per year, a considerable price reduction from its 2003 price of $1100 per patient per year. According to Médecins Sans Frontières (MSF), from 2014 to 2016, the prices of first-line antiretroviral drug treatment was cut down by roughly 30%, with the price for a recommended first-line regimen as low as $100 per patient per year. In 2018, the preferred first-line treatment of the fixed dose combination (FDC) TLD was available at $75 per patient per year.

==== Middle- and high-income countries ====
In middle- and high-income countries, the cost of first-line HIV treatment has been considerably greater than that of low-income countries. Middle- and high-income countries often have not been able import and use generic first-line drugs, which have caused them to resort to more expensive originator drugs. This can amount to considerably greater drug costs; for example, the 2016 generic drug price for TDF/FTC/EFV was $100 per patient per year, while the originator price for the same treatment was as high as $1033. Furthermore, the price of originator drug costs have tended to remain static, rendering it difficult to obtain price reductions. High-income countries have had issues involving expensive patented antiretroviral drugs; for example, in 2016 the TDF/FTV/EFV treatment was approximately $30,000 per patient per year in the US, whereas the generic medication only costed $100 per patient per year.

=== Second- and third-line treatment ===
For patients who failed first-line therapy, it may be necessary to transfer to second-line therapy in order to suppress HIV viral loads, and for patients who fail second-line therapy, it may be necessary transfer to third-line therapy. The failure rate of first-line antiretroviral regimen has been estimated to be approximately 15%, indicating that a portion of patients receiving antiretroviral drug treatment may need to switch to second- or third-line therapy. Switching to either of the therapies often involve a leap in prices; moving from first-line to second-line treatment may mean a nearly threefold increase in cost, and moving from second-line to third-line treatment may mean a nearly seven-fold increase in cost (eighteen-fold increase from first-line). Furthermore, countries often spend disproportionally on treatment by providing third-line regimens. In Morocco, the cost of treating 20 people with third-line treatment ($20,400 per patient per year) was comparable to the cost of treating 1700 people with first-line treatment ($240 per patient per year).

==== Low-income countries ====
According to PEPFAR in 2014, the average cost of second-line treatment was $657 versus the average cost for first-line treatment of $286. Despite the price jump from first-line to second-line treatment, second-line treatment costs have shown a pattern of decline for both originator and generic drugs. In 2016, AZT/3TC and ATV/r were the cheapest generic second-line drugs at a cost of $286 per patient per year, an 11% decrease from 2014. The WHO recommended the boosted protease inhibitors ATV/r and LPV/r for second-line treatments, but LPV/r has generally been more expensive. Third-line regimens reflect an even greater rise in costs, where the lowest price for a third-line treatment in 2016 was $1,859 per patient per year.

==== Middle- and high-income countries ====
Middle- and high-income countries have paid considerably higher prices relative to low-income countries for second- and third-line regimens. For example, the 2013 cost of LPV/r in second-line treatment in both Argentina ($2,570 per patient per year) and Mexico ($2,511 per patient per year) was over twelve-fold that of the price of LPV/r in South Africa ($204 per patient per year), and the 2014 cost of LPV/r in Malaysia was even greater (>$3,500 per patient per year). For third-line treatments, middle- and high-income countries have also faced challenges of expensive drug prices. In the US, the cost of third-line treatment was 41% greater than the cost of first-line treatment, at respective prices of $40,804 per patient per year and $28,861 per patient per year in 2013.

== High prices of HIV treatment ==
The high cost of certain antiretroviral drugs, especially those of middle- and high-income countries, has been a pressing issue which stemmed from a variety of factors and may have adverse and unintended consequences. Despite government and activist efforts to limit the price of HIV drugs, they have still often remained at unaffordable prices due to reasons such as patent barriers on antiretroviral drugs and slow regulatory approval. This may have indirect consequences including greater HIV drug resistance and an increased number of opportunistic infections. Various activist groups and movements have striven to overcome barriers of affordable drug prices and administer drugs in cost-effective manners, effectively reducing the prices of antiretroviral therapy to a considerable degree.

=== Reasons for high antiretroviral therapy prices ===
Many countries have had strict patent protections on originator drug brands, excluding these nations from various voluntary license agreements and often rendering them unable to attain antiretroviral drugs at affordable prices. For example, the Medicines Patent Pool (MPP) has actively worked with the drug industry to license drug products and bring them to more affordable prices with a wider range of access. However, because MPP drug licenses were often prohibited from violating active patents of various countries, they were unable to provide the cheaper generic drugs and negotiated licenses to such nations. The countries of Belarus, China, Malaysia and Kazakhstan have been prevented from obtaining generic DTG, a WHO recommended first-line antiretroviral therapy, due to their exclusion from MPP licenses. As such, the price of DTG in Belarus was $2190 per patient per year as opposed to $61 per patient per year from generic drug companies (2018). The United States has provided first-line TDF/FTC/EFV treatment as a patented, brand name drug (Atripla), which have caused their treatment costs (approximately $30,000 per patient per year) to be considerably higher than generic drug treatments ($100 per patient per year) (2016). Brazilian Health Minister Jose Serra announced in 2001 that his government could find no way to pay for the cost of patented HIV drugs, and would produce Hoffmann-La Roche's nelfinavir in violation of international patent laws in order to provide affordable HIV treatment for their citizens. Second- and third-line antiretroviral drugs have been even more susceptible to increased prices from patented drugs due to a lack of generic drug providers. For example, the biopharmaceutical company AbbVie charged $740 per patient per year for second-line LPV/r in middle- and high-income countries and $231 per patient per year in low-income countries (2016).

Excessive patent protection may also be attributed to evergreening, or methods to extend patents that are about to expire. Drug companies may extend patents well beyond their original expiration date by making slight modifications to their drug, preventing antiretroviral drugs from attaining reduced prices. For example, GSK added a secondary patent for abacavir (ABC) with only minor changes and was able to effectively extend its patent of the drug by eight years in Ukraine. As such, the price of ABC in Ukraine has been as high as $277.40 per patient per year while other countries with the equivalent generic drug offered them at $123.42 per patient per year (2016). The brand name drug Truvada, which provides the WHO recommended treatment of TDF/FTC, has also been able to extend its original patent expiry year of 2017 to 2026 through minor modifications to the drug.

Delayed processes in patent approval may also be a barrier to lower HIV treatment costs. Especially for third-line drugs, slow regulatory approval can limit the market of antiretroviral drugs available, leading to originator companies providing sole-source products and gaining nearly complete control of drug prices. Slow regularly approval may often be attributed to data and market exclusivity rules, which are intended to protect clinical data submitted for patent approval and prevent other competitors from entering the market, respectively. For example, originator brands have 8 years of data exclusivity and 2 years of market exclusivity in Europe, which has allowed Gilead Sciences to have exclusivity on treatments of TDF, TDF/FTC, and TDF/FTC/EFV for 10 years each, preventing other marketing during this time.

=== Consequences of high antiretroviral therapy costs ===
Some consequences of high antiretroviral drug prices include greater occurrences of HIV resistance and an increase in the number of opportunistic infections. Patients may have financial difficulties obtaining access to expensive drugs, resulting in greater difficulties in adhering to recommended drug regimens for adequate viral suppression. For example, the lack of cheap and easily accessible generic pediatric DTG has contributed to inadequate nevirapine-based treatments in 40% of children who followed an HIV treatment regimen. With suboptimal adherence to treatment, there is an increased risk of HIV drug resistance in which the previously used treatment would no longer adequately suppress the HIV infection. The detection for HIV resistance can also be difficult and expensive as well, rendering lower-middle income countries unable to have access to various resistance tests and identifying resistant patients for treatment switches. HIV patients who have already developed resistance to first-line treatment are often barred from overcoming their resistance due to the difficulty in obtaining second- or third-line treatments, which can be several times more expensive than first-line treatment.

In individuals infected with HIV, they may also have a weakened immune system, rendering them more susceptible to opportunistic infections such as invasive cervical cancer, Kaposi's sarcoma, and tuberculosis. The high price of antiretroviral drugs may act as a barrier to HIV treatment, thereby increasing the likelihood of developing an opportunistic infection. Taking the recommended drug regimen for HIV is particularly useful in the prevention and treatment costly opportunistic infections. For example, antiretroviral therapy has been able to assist in the prevention of tuberculosis, pneumocystis pneumonia, Kaposi sarcoma, and severe bacterial infections, and may be useful in treating tuberculosis.

=== Activism to reduce antiretroviral therapy costs ===
Throughout the past decade, there have been activist movements that have influenced the procurement lower HIV drug prices at greater accessibility. In 2000, the cost for first-line treatment was over $10,000 per patient per year, and nearly two decades later in 2018, the cost has decreased to as low as $75 per patient per year.

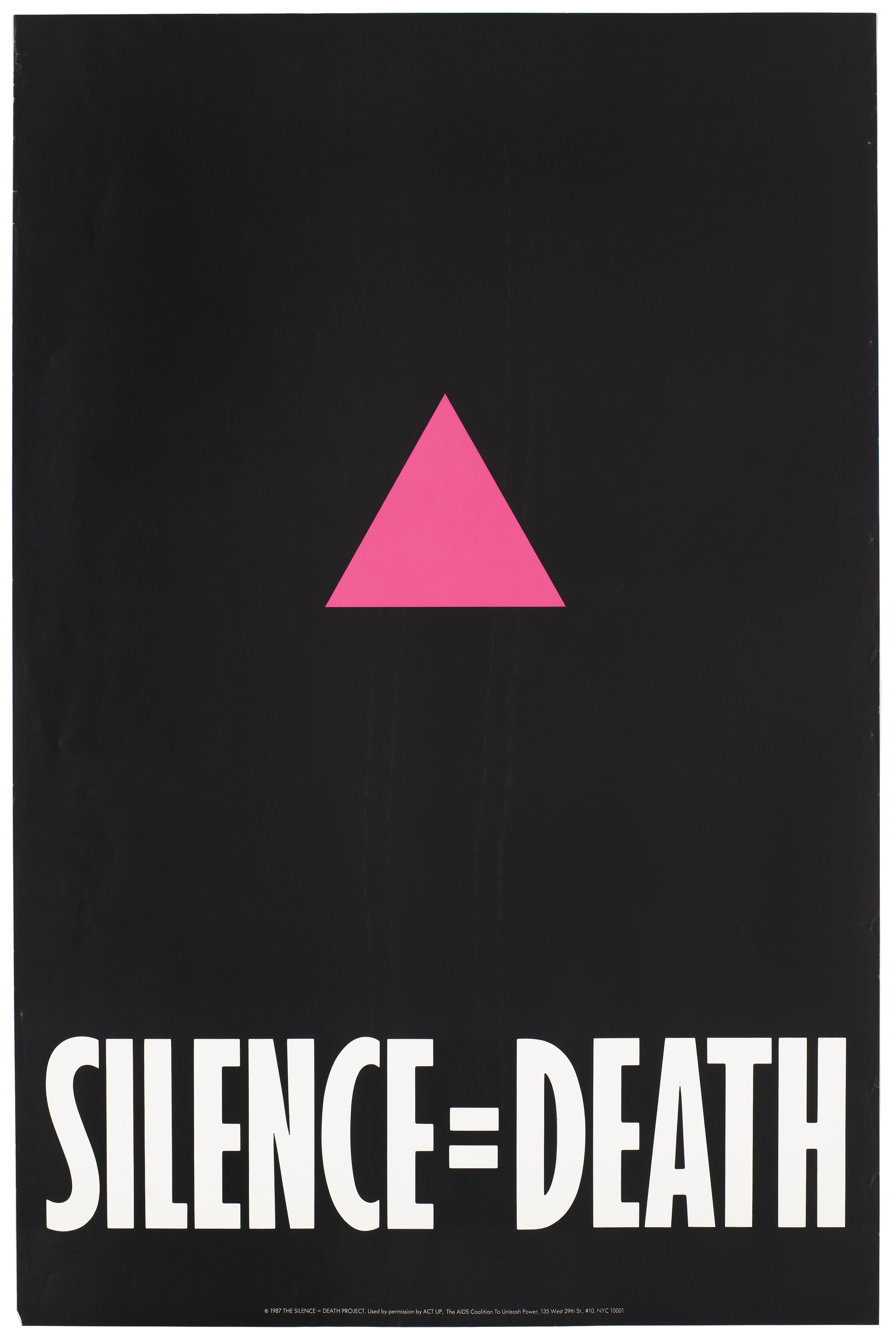
An advertisement for The Silence = Death Project of ACT UP to bring about HIV treatment reform

In 1987, AIDS Coalition to Unleash Power (ACT UP) was the first international organization designed to advocate for people with HIV. On September 14, 1989, members of ACT UP protested at the New York Stock Exchange over the Burroughs Wellcome's setting a price of US$10,000 per year for AZT, which was the only effective treatment for HIV discovered and was unaffordable to many HIV positive persons. Several days later in response to the protest the company lowered the price of AZT to $6,400 per patient per year, a 20% reduction.

In 1997, the South African government attempted to make legal amendments to import patented HIV drugs at more affordable prices due to their severe inaccessibility in developed countries. In response, 39 pharmaceutical companies filed a class action lawsuit. The lawsuit would eventually be dropped years later in 2001 due to public backlash. The government's legal challenge was an important case which brought attention and urgency to the issue of unaffordable antiretroviral therapy, spurring greater activism in reducing HIV drug prices.

In 1999 at the United Nations in Geneva, AIDS activists proposed compulsory licensing for antiretroviral drugs, which would enable other non-patent holders to produce the drugs at lower market costs. The idea of taking legal measures to limit the price of HIV treatment continued to spread globally. In 1998, Brazil was the first developing nation to implement a national HIV-reduction program which produced generic versions of originator drugs, allowing consumers to purchase antiretroviral drugs at prices that were on average 79% lower than the market price before. In 2000, the Treatment Action Campaign of the International AIDS Conference in Durban prioritized increasing access to antiretroviral drugs and created the Global March for Treatment. Later on that year, a global summit in Okinawa, Japan, founded the Global Fund to optimize international funding for curbing HIV and other diseases.

In response to rising public pressures, pharmaceutical companies began to sell antiretroviral drugs at discounted prices through the Accelerating Access Initiative; however, even at the discounted prices the brand name drugs still were not as affordable as their generic counterparts. In 2001, India released a generic antiretroviral drug treatment for $350 per patient per year at a time when the originator version would have cost approximately $1000 per patient per year. This great price difference demonstrated the possibility of considerably more affordable antiretroviral drug costs to the public, prompting greater widespread activism. That same year at the World Trade Organization Ministerial Conference, the Doha Declaration on the TRIPS agreement and public health was adopted, emphasizing that nations should not be hindered by intellectual property rights when promoting public health.

In 2003, HIV/AIDS was officially declared a global health emergency by the WHO, and for the next several years, with the combined effort and funding from organizations such as national governments, the Global Fund, and PEPFAR, the cost of HIV treatment was able to decline and accessibility to generic drug brands increased, especially in developing nations. In 2010, the Medicines Patent Pool (MPP) was founded for the purpose of negotiating with pharmaceutical companies to reduce drug prices for treatment of HIV as well as other diseases, allowing countries who are part of the agreement to further offer reduced drug prices to consumers.
