= Betty Makoni =

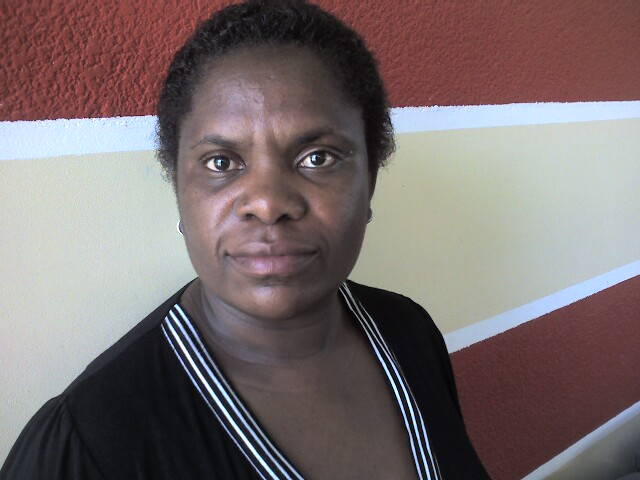
- Born: 22 June 1971 (age 55); Rusape, Zimbabwe
- Education: University of Zimbabwe
- Known for: Gender Activism
- Website: muzvarebettymakoni.org

Hazviperi Betty Makoni is a Zimbabwean women's rights activist who in 1999 founded the Girl Child Network, a charity which supports Zimbabwe's young sex abuse victims. The network has since expanded to the US, Europe, and various countries in Africa.

She earned two degrees from the University of Zimbabwe, and has been awarded numerous national and international awards. Orphaned as a child and sexually abused, Makoni is the principal subject in the documentary film, Tapestries of Hope.

== Early life ==
Makoni's life began in St Mary's in the poor suburb of Chitungwiza, Zimbabwe. She spent much of her early life watching her father beat her mother almost every night, and carrying over both her parents would beat her and her five siblings. Makoni was pushed at a very young age to find work and support her five other siblings. At age six, at the last customer stop of her day of work, Makoni entered the shop with her friends and was locked inside. The shopkeeper proceeded to rape her and all of her friends, believing that raping virgins would bring luck. Three years later her mother died in a domestic violence accident, at the hands of her father, while pregnant and soon after she was sent to a boarding school notorious for beating children.

== Career ==
In 2000 she began created the Girl Child Network, with the hope to support girls rights and build strength between them. If a girl needed support because she had been raped, forced to quit school, needed money to pay for food, clothes, or whatever a girl needed, Betty was there. Throughout her career in the Girl Child Network, Betty has been able to support almost 40,00 girls across her career, and many regional country's organizations have replicated the model implemented by Girl Child Network. The Girl Child Network continues to expand across the globe, to the USA, Europe and parts of Africa to support girls across the globe. With its flourishing, so has Betty Makoni's career, where she now serves as the Chief Executive Officer of Girl Child Network Worldwide.

== Empowerment Villages ("safe homes") ==
As her work grew, Makoni expanded the Girl Child Network to become a nationwide system which included "empowerment villages", safe houses designed for girls fleeing sexual abuse and domestic violence. GCN facilities such as these offer emergency shelters, medical referrals, psychological counseling, legal assistance, and reintegration support for survivors. These empowerment villages also double as facilities for young women to receive mentoring, life skills education, leadership development, and academic support. According to news articles, thousands of these young women pass through safe homes, hundreds of them returning to school or beginning new, independent lives and careers following this rehabilitation.

== Accolades ==
- In 2003 the Women's World Summit Foundation awarded Makoni with the Prize for Women's Creativity in Rural Life.
- In 2007, Makoni won the World's Children's Prize for the Rights of the Child.
- In 2008, Amnesty International awarded her its Ginetta Sagan Award for her work with the GCN.
- In 2009, Makoni received the CNN Heroes award for protection of the powerless
- She was named a Global Decades Child Rights Hero alongside notable figures such as Nelson Mandela and Graca Michel
- In 2006 Makoni and The Girl Child Network received the coveted United Nations Red Ribbon award for addressing gender inequalities that fuel the HIV/AIDS epidemic
- Betty Makoni was named among Hillary Clinton and numerous world leaders as 150 women who shake the world
- The Women In Film and Television Awards-Los Angeles –USA
- Giraffe Heroes Project Award 2009

== Personal life ==
Makoni left Zimbabwe in 2008, after receiving numerous death threats connected to her work defending girls from sexual abuse. In interviews, she has explained that much of her advocacy has led her to create powerful enemies, including individuals with political influence, and that she became the subject of a defamation campaign accusations of financial misconduct. Later on, and independent audit by KPMG cleared her of all accusations. During this time, she reported receiving repeated death threats over the phone and was warned by Zimbabwe secret service that her life was in danger. Following this, Makoni decided to flee to South Africa before relocating with her family to England where she lives now and continues her work in safety. She is now living married with her husband Irvine Nyamapfene and three children.

== See also ==
- Virgin cleansing myth
