= Walk-in agent =

Spy who offers their services without recruitment

A walk-in agent is an individual who voluntarily offers to conduct espionage. Specifically, a "walk-in" is an agent or a mole of a government who literally walks into an embassy or intelligence agency without prior contact or recruitment as an asset.
