= HIV/AIDS in New York City =

HIV/AIDS deaths in NYC by year, 1981–2014

New York City was affected by the AIDS epidemic of the 1980s more than any other U.S. city. The AIDS epidemic has been and continues to be highly localized due to a number of complex socio-cultural factors that affect the interaction of the populous communities that inhabit New York.

During the 1980s epidemic, the large presence of the gay community prompted local medical practitioners to take note of and respond to observed patterns of reported ailments early on. Widespread fear and panic about the epidemic were combatted by efforts of community activists and local government policies that were at some times supportive, and at other times damaging or ineffectual.

Improvements of both drug therapies and prevention education have led to a decreased number of AIDS cases. In June 2014, then-New York Governor Andrew Cuomo announced a new strategy designed to "End the Epidemic" in the state through a combination of increased HIV screening and testing, promotion of pre-exposure prophylaxis (PrEP) and improved linkage and retention in clinical care for HIV-positive persons. Two years later the New York City Department of Health and Mental Hygiene reported a decline in new infections of nearly 8 percent annually or approximately 15% since the campaign was launched.

== Medical research ==
=== First response ===
Michael Simberkoff, chief of staff of the Department of Veterans Affairs New York Harbor Medical Center, was a member of the Infectious Diseases staff in 1980 and was one of the first medical researchers to treat AIDS patients. According to Simberkoff, at first the outbreak was identified as a "gay-related immunodeficiency disease" that his group knew very little about and did not know how to treat. The Infectious Diseases community began to get together on a regular basis at the VA New York Harbor Medical Center and at the New York Department of Health to share their experiences. Soon it became clear that gay men were not the only ones who had the disease; intravenous drug abusers also appeared to get infected.

In 1983, the virus that causes AIDS (Acquired Immune Deficiency Syndrome) was identified and labeled as Lymphadenopathy Associated Virus (LAV) by Luc Montagnier at the Pasteur Institute in Paris. In 1984, it was also identified by Robert Gallo of National Cancer Institute and named the Human T-cell Lymphotropic Virus (HTLV III). There was a conflict as to who first identified the virus, but it was resolved in a joint agreement. The virus was later renamed Human Immunodeficiency Virus (HIV).

=== First drug ===
The first drug used to treat HIV was called AZT which was later known as zidovudine. It was made by Burroughs Wellcome. The clinical trials of the drug were conducted at several VA hospitals, including those in New York, Miami, Los Angeles, San Francisco, and Washington, D.C. At the time of its release, it was the most expensive drug ever made, at $10,000 for a year of treatment.

== Gay community response ==
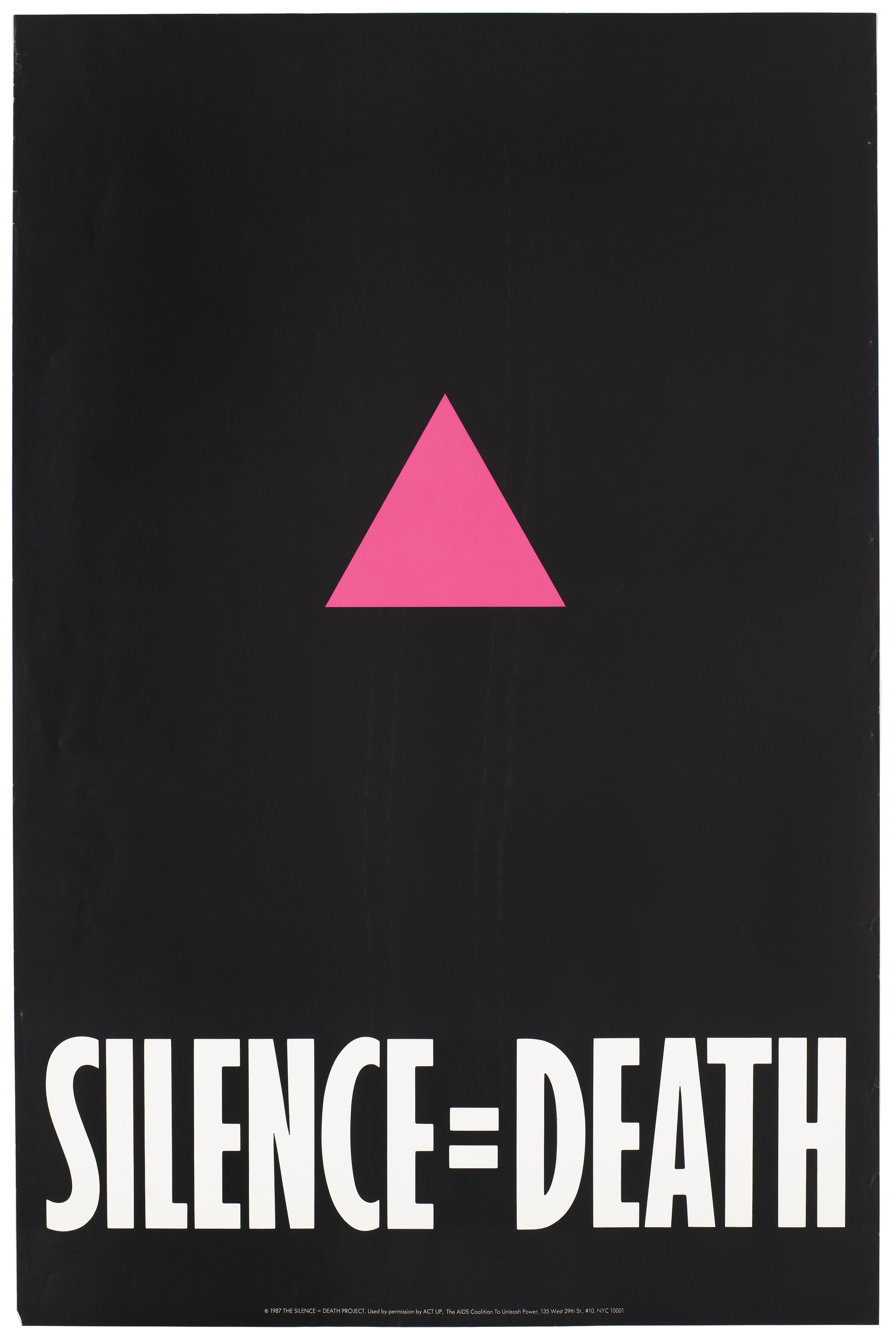
A 1987 advertisement for The Silence = Death Project by ACT-UP, The AIDS Coalition To Unleash Power. Poster features a pink triangle against a black backdrop.

The early history of the AIDS epidemic in New York City began with early rumors in 1981 of a "gay plague". Because AIDS first emerged among populations considered marginal by many mainstream residents of New York City, including prostitutes, drug users, and men who had sex with men, early responses to the disease were uneven and underfunded. Federal government response caused a delay in the wider recognition of the extent of the problem. As late as 1986, the Reagan administration continued to discourage panic by saying that AIDS primarily affected gay men and intravenous drug users.

During this early period, New Yorkers were not sufficiently informed about the disease: how you could get it, who could get affected, and the consequences of it. It was first described as being a rare form of cancer, called Kaposi's sarcoma.

The gay community organized a response to the epidemic through four stages: the development of community-based help and advocacy organizations such as the Gay Men's Health Crisis (GMHC); the evolution of broader advocacy, lobbying and funding organizations such as the American Foundation for AIDS Research; the formation of effective Washington lobbying groups; and the rise of militant activism exemplified by the radical tactics of ACT UP (AIDS Coalition To Unleash Power), which have been documented in over 180 interviews by the ACTUP Oral History Project.

Health and gay rights organizations, such as GMHC, worked on raising awareness. One of GMHC's strategies was setting up counseling tables in bathhouses. Jerry Johnson, the program's former leader found that half of the people who approached him were ignorant about the spread of the disease. The government then started to create initiatives to educate the population about reducing risk.

=== Education and support for risk reduction ===
Around 1985, public and private institutions started to create programs to educate the population. They began to hold informational meetings and public forums, distribute literature, and started outreach efforts such as a hotline for counseling and referrals. The HTLV-III Hotline started operating in 1982, offering counseling services for persons with AIDS. The hotline staff met with social service providers, the New York State AIDS institute, the New York Blood Center and the Hemophilia Foundation in order to coordinate resources for post-test counseling programs. Evidence of 623 calls received during the period of April 20, 1985, to May 24, 1985, demonstrated the effectiveness of this program.

By June 10, 1985, the GMHC developed a contract to deliver comprehensive education of high risk gay men and youth in order for them to offer counseling and open more offices in the Bronx and Brooklyn, so more people could receive their services. This plan cost approximately $83,000 in the fiscal year 1986.

=== AIDS and New York Art Communities ===
Arts and creative organizations were particularly active and visible in the community efforts around AIDS. Some grew out of existing organizations. The Alliance for the Arts began an influential initiative called Estate Project for Artists with AIDS. The Estate Project supported artists, filmmakers, composers, and choreographers with AIDS in preparing their archives, organizing and preserving artworks, giving grants, and running a program that presented musical and dance performances. They also published an information brochure, Future Safe: Estate Planning for Artists in a Time of AIDS, distributing 100,000 copies.

The organization Visual AIDS began in 1988 with the mission of highlighting the work of artists who had or had died from complications related to AIDS. Their first Day Without Art: A National Day of Action and Mourning, December 1, 1989, involved art museums and galleries around the country who altered their regular installations to illustrate the impact AIDS was having on the visual arts.

An effort to identify artists who had died from AIDS-related complications was started in 1989 by gallerist Simon Watson and art critic Jerry Saltz. With the Witness Project, they mailed out census-style slips to be distributed like chain-letters and returned with names of those who had died to be recorded. In the design world, Design Industries Foundation for AIDS (DIFFA) raised money for designers coping with AIDS, holding celebrity-studded gala dinners as early as 1988.

== Government response ==
=== Funding ===
In 1981, the New York City government was not prepared to deal with this health emergency, as the city was just recovering from the fiscal crisis of the 1970s, when Mayor Ed Koch took office. At the beginning of the epidemic there was no funding from either federal or city government. As Jonathan M. Soffer argues, "the ultimate blame for devastation of the city in the 1970s lies in Washington and the anti-urban administrations of Gerald Ford, Jimmy Carter, and Ronald Reagan." It was the community organization Gay Men's Health Crisis (GMHC) that began raising funds to deal with this new disease by holding the first benefit to collect funds for the epidemic in 1982.

Only in the late 1980s did the city government fully put forth an effort to address the issue. This was largely because Health Commissioner Stephen Joseph took office in 1985, replacing David Judson Sencer, who was criticized for not taking action during his term. There were individuals such as Larry Kramer, one of the organizers of GMHC, who were outspoken about their dislike towards Mayor Koch and his office, especially in regards to Sencer. Kramer even claimed that "the mayor of New York is helping to kill us." Judge Joseph Lisa who was on the City Council claimed there was no active effort to respond to the spread of the disease from the Health Commissioner until Sencer stepped down and Joseph took over: "he [Sencer] wasn't, in my opinion, the kind of health commissioner that we needed in the epidemic. Joseph, on the other hand, was much stronger." Joseph was responsible for beginning of the Needle Exchange Program, even though many civic groups were against the idea: the police, black community leadership, even the publisher of the New York Amsterdam News, who declared that "when the first needle is given out, Joseph should be arrested for murder."

Thus the government's role during the AIDS crisis was seen as being more reactive than proactive, as described by members of the medical community such as Jo Ivey Boufford, who saw that very few programs were being funded for AIDS prevention. When Boufford became president of the NYC Health and Hospitals Commission in 1985, five years after the AIDS crisis had hit New York City, her first task was to develop a primary care strategy for AIDS patients. Boufford's team encountered several problems: since governmental involvement had been delayed, doctors had to deal with terminally ill patients; the disease was still being viewed as a homosexual disease, so prevention and advertising was very limited; perhaps most importantly, funds were being used reactively instead of proactively.

In a sense, Boufford reported, the HIV crisis transformed the care system, including housing, support, primary care, and coordinated care management, more than any previous medical crisis. She also explained that the hospitals had to become more like a family doctor rather than an ambulatory care system. When it came to funding, the New York City Health and Hospitals Corporation (HHC) also had to make sure that the investments coming in were strengthening the system, especially because, as Boufford explained, "we tend to fund acute care hospitals in the United States, and we're very hospital-oriented, very specialty-oriented country in terms of our investments ... we're over invested in acute healthcare." On June 17, 1985, a meeting with voluntary hospitals was held to establish joint procedures for working with AIDS patients. The HHC began employee training programs, and created videos, discussions guides and booklets. The HHC also established protective guidelines for employees.

The NYC Department of Health (DOH) began outreach efforts including production of 5,000 HTLV-III flyers that were printed and distributed to community organizations. In May 1985, the AIDS Education Unit hired a Health Educator and Graphic Design Consultant. HTLV-III AIDS wallet cards and fact sheets began to be produced and distributed. Also, in May 1985 the New York State Association of Substance Abuse Agencies held a meeting to discuss the implementation of seminars and conferences. A planning committee was formed on June 30, 1985, and Commissioner Sencer led a meeting with substance abuse experts at the DOH on how best to educate the substance abuse community about the risk of acquiring AIDS.

On June 13, 1985, the Department of Housing Preservation and Development provided two buildings appropriate for persons with AIDS in East Harlem and in Brooklyn. These locations were chosen due to the numbers of AIDS patients located in the Bellevue and Kings Hospitals. This plan cost US$1 million.

=== Public Schools and Children with AIDS ===
In 1985, Judge Harold Hyman held a hearing on examining children for the virus. In a comment made to Louis Cooper, the chief pediatrician of St. Luke's-Roosevelt Hospital at the time, the purpose of the hearing was to make sense of his judgement after two Queens school districts sued the City to hold children with HIV/AIDS from attending school regularly. His questions from the trial is whether children with AIDS are considered handicapped, and should their status become known to their teachers. When Judge Hyman made his decision, he approved the policy that CWA were not to be excluded from attending school, while scrutinizing the policy as a "secret". He further criticized the medical field as professionally irresponsible for causing mass hysteria. Frederick A.O Schwarz, Jr., whom was the City Corporation Counsel, defended the City's policymakers because they "acted in a way that reflected the pressure of time."

As for the determination of children having handicapped status, the Assistant Attorney General Charles J. Cooper issued a memorandum on June 20, 1986, on AIDS-patient discrimination. Section 504 of The Rehabilitation Act of 1974 was interpreted by the Department of Justice that discrimination was prohibited on those who were disabled by the disease, giving them handicapped status. The City's Assistant Corporation Counsel issued a memorandum to Schwarz in July 1976 that the act did not protect asymptomatic AIDS patients and those who were AIDS-related complex. The memorandum also further asserted that the basis of discrimination made by those who feared contagious transmission was not protected under law.

=== Needle Exchange Program ===
In 1985, David Sencer, New York City's health commissioner first proposed the distribution of clean needles to drug users in order to prevent the spread of AIDS, but city officials and local law enforcement opposition hindered this plan. Evidence from effective needle exchange programs in European cities caused a shift in public opinion, and in 1988, New York City Health Commissioner Stephen C. Joseph, was permitted to initiate the needle exchange program as a clinical trial involving a limited group of drug users access to clean needles and syringes.

When the program started, New York City police commissioner Ben Ward sought to avert police harassment of drug users making Joseph's intent of AIDS prevention known to police precincts. Development of these programs were slowed by opposition from a range of government officials and communities and Commissioner Ward later suggested the possibility of unethical practices that recalled the Tuskegee syphilis experiment.

Joseph credited activists such as Yolanda Serrano, the head of the Association for Drug Abuse Prevention and Treatment (ADAPT) for calling attention to how the problem of addiction was far less dire than the overwhelming number of deaths from the rapidly spreading AIDS epidemic. However, at the start of Mayor David Dinkins administration in 1990, the only legal needle exchange program was shut down. Following new studies that demonstrated reduction in HIV infection rates, new programs restarted in New York City in 1992.

=== Housing ===
The housing needs of New Yorkers were also seriously affected by the HIV crisis. For example, Mayor Dinkins who was previously Manhattan Borough President, intended to place people with HIV/AIDS into city-run shelters, not permanent housing as he had promised earlier. However given the gravity of the health and social needs of people with HIV, the City Council urged Mayor Dinkins to establish dedicated services.

Despite the ruling of United 21 et al vs City of New York, which repealed Mayor Koch's Executive Order 50 on affirmative action, the Council also called on teaming with religious communities and other city agencies in order to establish residences for people with HIV/AIDS as they were regularly segregated in hospitals and did not receive adequate care.

Mayor Edward Koch, Dinkins' predecessor, realized the need for housing for people with HIV/AIDS. However, he did face opposition by some anti-homelessness nonprofit organizations. Nonetheless, Koch wanted to utilize federal funds from HUD to establish homes especially for people with HIV/AIDS. He did reach out to nonprofits despite the opposition in order to find suitable places or residences. In the meanwhile to address the rising foster child crisis, Koch created a rent subsidy program for those housing foster children as he established HIV testing program for such children.

On top of the desperate need for raising wages for health care workers, there was also the persistent need for funding hospitals. Mayor Koch raised rates for 24-hour home care attendants through the Board of Estimate because the NYC Human Resources Administration was unwilling to regulate contractual labor agreements. Mayor Koch increased wages by 20%, with weekend employees having the largest increase. With the building of new dedicated housing for people with HIV/AIDS, the increase would have employed more home health aides. This was made possible with the reimbursement by New York State and Federal governments. Meanwhile, Deputy Mayor Brezenoff assured the future Mayor Dinkins that the City's in rem program would allow the City to house households and people with HIV/AIDS. Dinkins welcomed the news, but however, requested that families are given first consideration and to double what was allotted. Koch then assured Dinkins that the City will reimburse health assisted housing and at-home nursing programs in order to made sure that housing was first stable before building new ones. In addition to the promise and demand of using more in rem properties converted into permanent housing, there was the issue of decaying buildings and management needed to address them.

Besides using in-rem properties, the City received proposals by not-for-profits in order to house people with AIDS. This included, in one example, a conversion of a mansion into a facility to assist children with AIDS being housed with their parents, hospice care, and group residency within one property. There were also further calls for using hotel accommodations for single adults who did not require hospitalization.

== Comparison with San Francisco ==
No two cities were more prominent in the battle against AIDS in the 1980s than New York and San Francisco. The majority of people who had AIDS came from these two cities. Some gay activists like Richard Dunne from New York's Gay Men's Health Crisis believed comparisons between the two cities were of limited value because their governments handled the matter very differently, but argued nonetheless that San Francisco managed the matter more effectively.

Mayor Edward Koch and New York City Commissioner of Health David Sencer believed that demographics played a key role in how New York City handled AIDS. Stephen C. Joseph, who succeeded Sencer as the commissioner, agreed that these two cities should not be compared because of the great difference the population of the two cities and that New York saw a great number of cases due to intravenous drug use.

Early in the crisis, many critics in New York looked to San Francisco because San Francisco was the only other major city that confronted multiple deaths from AIDS. The Center of Disease Control (CDC) reported the first case of AIDS in the country in 1980, Ken Horne, a San Francisco resident. On June 13, 1985, Victor Botnick reported 932 cases of AIDS in San Francisco. By September 1987, the number had increased to 3,785.

=== "Gay Disease" ===
AIDS was initially viewed as a "Gay Man's Disease" because of the high incidence of gay men getting the disease. As a result, many in New York looked at San Francisco as a point of comparison because since the late 1960s, San Francisco had been the premier gay community in the country. The gay connection, however, did not mean that the two cities were completely similar. The New York gay community believed that San Francisco was educating the gay community better and providing more resources to combat the disease. Many then became more vocal about wanting New York to adopt some of the same programs and resources as San Francisco.

=== New York City Government responds ===
As the public debate continued about what the two cities were doing, many government and community leaders in New York such as Councilwoman Carol Greitzer claimed that San Francisco had been spending more money on AIDS patients, particularly for counseling and housing. Greitzer wanted Mayor Koch to create a committee that would work on trying to establish a hospice for people with AIDS. Primarily focusing on patient care after being in the hospital, Greitzer noted that the reason why things were being run differently in San Francisco were because "there's a lot more counseling in San Francisco on a one-to-one basis. There's a lot more education not only of the gay community, but I think of the general public [as well]."

There were others though who offered different opinions about how New York City operated. Richard Dunne believed that "the comparisons between the respective performances of the city government of New York and San Francisco are of limited value." Dunne noted that the reason why it was so limited was because "San Francisco is a much smaller city, with a tradition of a strong gay political presence, a less complex epidemiology of AIDS, an excess of hospital beds and a budget surplus at the beginning of the AIDS epidemic." Factors like the ones Dunne states help build the argument that San Francisco was able to act quickly and efficiently because "San Francisco's experience is unique and cannot, perhaps should not, be attempted in other settings."

=== Demographic differences ===
Although San Francisco and New York were the two major cities combating AIDS, the people getting the virus were very different. A Department of Health Report given to Mayor Koch in October 1987 stated that New York had 11,513 AIDS cases and San Francisco had 3,775. Although San Francisco and New York both had large gay communities, the report noted that "San Francisco's AIDS crisis ... manifested primarily among the gay, white middle class population, while New York's ... increasingly [came] from intravenous drug users in minority communities." Specifically, 27% (2,727 of the 10,089 male cases) of the reported cases of AIDS in New York were from IV drug users, compared to the less than 1% that San Francisco had.

While the numbers do show that the cases of AIDS from gay men who had sex with other men in San Francisco was higher than New York's (85% in SF compared to 65% in NYC), the numbers show that the AIDS cases that came from IV drug use were also a big problem amongst women in New York. Out of the 221 AIDS cases listed in the report, 60% (725) of the AIDS cases for women in New York came as a result of IV drug use, compared to the 41% (12 of the 29 female cases) reported in San Francisco. In a letter from Lee Jones, a mayoral aide, to Mayor Koch about the demographics of AIDS cases, Jones stated that "44.9% of our caseload is white; 30.7 is black; 23.8 is Hispanic." Jones also claimed that "In 1982, the average number of new AIDS cases reported in New York was 31 cases. [However] in the first five months of 1987, the average number of new cases reported was 302 cases per month."

=== New York government programs ===
Among all the debate about what the city should be doing, New York City Commissioner of Health David Sencer talked about who was getting the disease at the time and how that affected the way New York had handled it. Sencer stated that because AIDS had been a disease that, up to that point, had affected young individuals, the city did not have the system necessary to take care of them. Instead its system had been geared towards taking care of the elderly, who had nursing homes and home health care ready for them.

However, as the problem grew larger, Sencer stated how "[s]uddenly we have a group of people with a chronic illness that comes and goes and it's difficult to develop the right kind of home care for these people. This has [be]come confounded by the fact that there's still unfortunately a fair amount of unsaid discrimination against people with AIDS, whether they be drug abusers or gay men. And it's difficult to get them into nursing homes. It's difficult to find housing for these individuals."

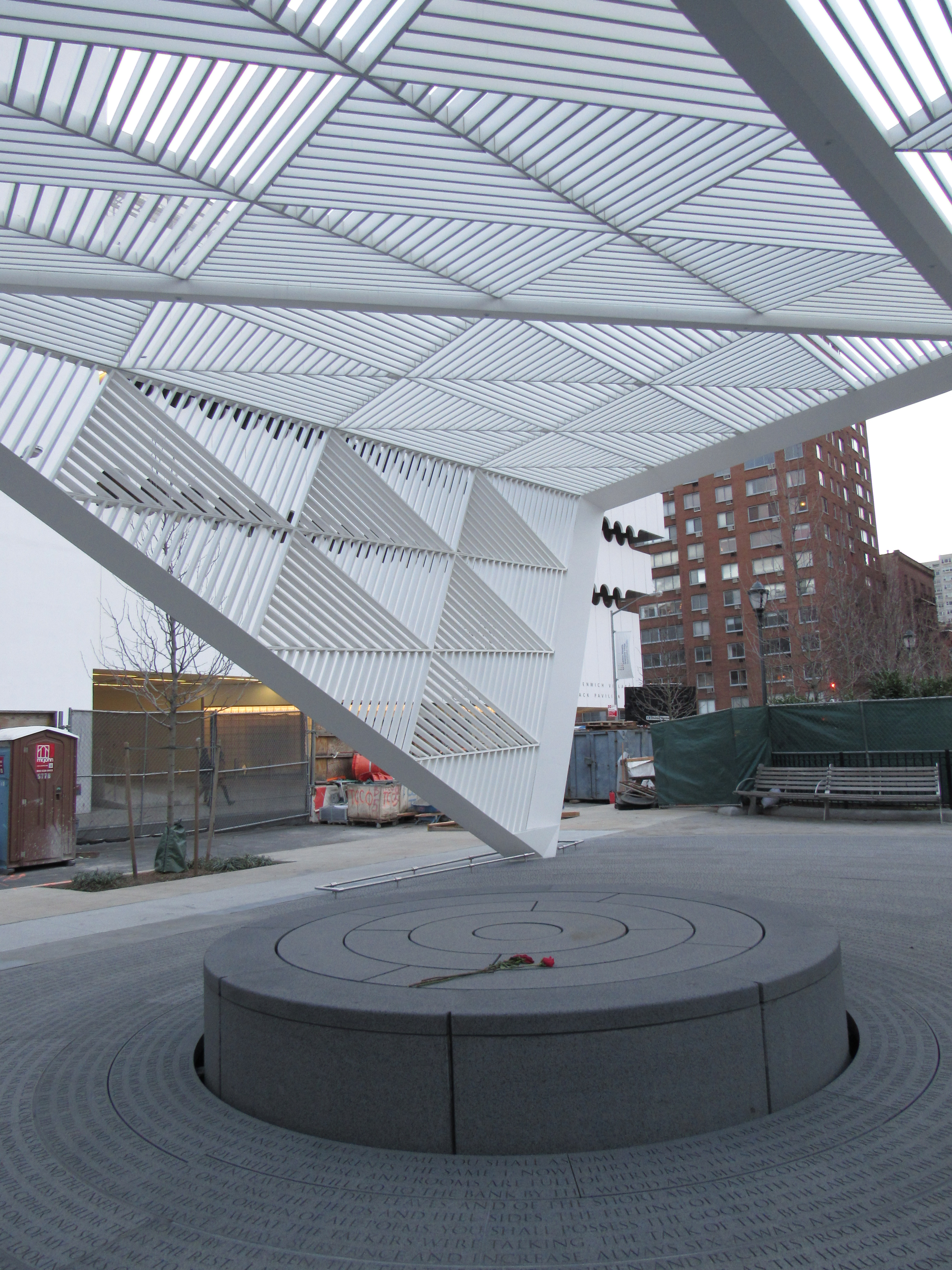
HIV AIDS NYC Monument

== Timeline of key events in NYC (up to 1989) ==
1977

- Donna Mildvan, chief of Infectious Disease at Beth Israel Hospital, and colleague Dan William draw a connection between symptoms seen in gay male patients
- The first evidence for HIV-1 infection among IV drug users in New York City is from three cases of AIDS in children born in 1977. This likely mother-to-child transmission within Manhattan "strongly suggests that the introduction of HIV-1 into the IV drug-use group occurred around 1975 or 1976, or perhaps even earlier."

1979

- Donna Mildvan identifies reports of a virulent diarrhea that is called Gay Bowel Syndrome

1981

- New York City Infectious Diseases Intercity Rounds records first cases of gay-related immunodeficiency diseases Lawrence D. Mass publishes a report in the newspaper, New York Native, about the spread of a mysterious disease, and warning gay men that the disease was being spread as a result of having frequent sex with other men. Kaposi's sarcoma is thought to be the main problem
- Lawrence Mass, Larry Kramer and others form the Gay Men's Health Crisis (GMHC), the first New York City nonprofit devoted to provide services to people with AIDS

1982

- February: Health Commissioner David Sencer listed increasing rate of Kaposi's sarcoma fourth in the city's health department priority list
- February: When asked by a reporter for the New York Native if news of the epidemic would be communicated via mass media, Sencer declines
- Findings in a report by Sencer and U.S. Center for Disease Control show that over half the 225 cases in Kaposi's sarcoma in the United States by January 1982 happened in New York
- The Center for Disease Control gives AIDS (Acquired Immune Deficiency Syndrome) its name
- GMHC holds the first benefit to collect funds for the epidemic
- Rodger MacFarlane, president of GMHC, begins an AIDS hotline in his own apartment
- GMHC co-founder Larry Kramer became a public spokesperson known for comments made to the press, including sharp criticisms of Ed Koch and David Sencer for their lack of action
- Michael Lange was of one of the first to outline the disaster that lay ahead.
- David Sencer tells Lawrence Mass that gay health would soon be his top priority but insisted on keeping the focus on preventative medicine; did not consider Kaposi's sarcoma important enough to ask for additional funds. Sencer changes his mind on the importance of Kaposi's sarcoma after attending first citywide meeting of Kaposi's sarcoma researchers
- New York City mayor Ed Koch declines to meet with activists
- Congress allocated US$2.6 million for CDC AIDS research but the Reagan administration opposed these measures

1983

- New York City virologists Mathilde Krim and Joseph Sonnabend found the AIDS Medical Foundation (AMF). It later becomes the American Foundation for AIDS Research (amfAR), and is still active today
- Larry Kramer writes the article "1,112 and counting" for the New York Native, where he viciously attacks Mayor Koch and city's health department for being ineffective
- Mayor Koch and David Sencer announce the formation of an office for Gay and Lesbian Health Concern under director Roger Enlow
- Representatives Ted Weiss from New York and Henry Waxman from Los Angeles led congressional investigations into the Reagan administration's AIDS-related policy efforts
- April 18: Larry Kramer resigns from the GMHC board
- April 30: The GMHC sponsors the first major fundraising event for AIDS, a benefit performance of a benefit performance of the Ringling Bros. and Barnum & Bailey Circus at Madison Square Garden. The program listed an official proclamation of "Aid AIDS Week" from Mayor Koch. On October 1, GMHC sponsors "The World's Toughest Rodeo" benefit at Madison Square Garden
- June: Mayor Koch joins San Francisco mayor Dianne Feinstein, Washington mayor Marion Barry, and New Orleans mayor Ernest Morial to push a resolution through the U.S. Conference of Mayors calling for "government assurance of adequate medical, hospital, and hospice care for victims of AIDS" as well as more funding for medical research. The four big-city mayors fight off opposition from three cabinet members dispatched by the Reagan administration to oppose the resolution and declare AIDS a local responsibility
- New York University holds a three-day conference on AIDS where Joseph Bove argues against the evidence of blood transmission
- Kevin Cahill organizes a conference at Lenox Hill Hospital with the intent to "attracts all the big-name AIDS researchers who could deliver state-of-the-art information on the epidemic." Cahill also arranged for immediate publication of their findings to initiate first Senate hearing on the syndrome
- Media coverage on AIDS begins to boom: outlets like Newsweek magazine and other major newspapers nationwide publish over 650 stories between December and April. Coverage included shortfalls of resources for AIDS research and education in NYC, and how the response in San Francisco was more effective
- Mathilde Krim plans to meet with New York City officials (Carol Bellamy, who did not see her, and Andrew Stein) to discuss a proposal for a coordinated city response based on San Francisco programs. Krim described the attitude as ineffectual: "nobody gave a damn"
- Larry Kramer writes a play called The Normal Heart, which dramatizes the beginning of the AIDS epidemic, "satirizing Koch and (Herb) Richman as callous bureaucrats"
- The "Denver Principles" are drafted at a conference convened by People With AIDS (PWA)-New York and People With AIDS (PWA)-San Francisco laying the groundwork for underground AIDS activism. This manifesto rejected the paternalism of the professional medical establishment and calls for participation in decision making at all levels
- Decision in the trial The People v. West 12 Street Tenants Corporation in favor of Joseph Sonnabend due to discrimination. New York becomes known as the nation's center for aggressive civil liberties litigation on behalf of people with AIDS and their circles
- Advocates for AIDS research in 14th Annual Lesbian and Gay Pride Parade attack sensationalist approaches from the press, asking for research, not for hysteria
- NYC accounts for more than half of AIDS deaths and new infections in the country
- New York State establishes an AIDS Advisory Council
- Koch meets with the AIDS Network to discuss efforts to mobilize agencies to fight AIDS. Koch allows for the selling of a city-owned building, formerly the Food Trades Vocational High School at 208 West 13th Street to AIDS organizations on "favorable terms". This site becomes the Lesbian, Gay, Bisexual and Transgender Community Center
- August: Secretary Margaret Heckler announces her support for transferring $40 million in federal funds to AIDS research. In her announcement, she is accompanied by Koch since in 1983 New York City was the site of 42% of reported AIDS cases

1984

- Mayor Koch runs for reelection
- GMHC publishes a safer sex booklet, "Healthy Sex is Great Sex"
- The Centers for Disease Control asks GMHC to assist them in creating public conferences on AIDS
- November: Ronald Reagan is re-elected as president. AIDS was not addressed in the campaign

1985

- Koch wins a third term. After the election, Koch and Governor Cuomo work to close the gay bathhouses
- April: The First International AIDS Conference, organized by the U.S. Centers for Disease Control and Prevention, is held in Atlanta, Georgia
- Mildvan recorded hearing an estimate that one million people in the world at that time might be harboring the HIV retrovirus
- April: Kramer's play The Normal Heart opens at Joseph Papp's Public Theater, starring D.W. Moffett, Phillip Richard Allen, Brad Davis and Concetta Tomei It is nominated for a Tony award and wins one for a revival in 2011
- As a result of the play, Koch responded by claiming that the city was spending US$31 million a year on AIDS (most of that money paid for care for AIDS patients in city hospitals and did not represent new spending), and he announced a US$6 million increase in city AIDS funding, with new programs for subsidized housing, home care, added resources for acute at hospitals, better coordination of medical teams, and educational program, hospice care, and more research funding.
- June 15: GMHC and New York Physicians for Human Rights sponsor an AIDS Conference at Hunter College
- July 22: 4,133 cases of AIDS have been reported in New York City, an increase of 207 cases from the previous month
- October 2: Hollywood film actor Rock Hudson was one of the first celebrities to publicly acknowledge that he had AIDS. His death and struggle to receive treatment brought attention to the problems faced by PWAs
- No longer trusting Sencer, Koch names Victor Botnick co-chair of the AIDS Policy and Planning Committee
- Based on the findings of a medical panel, Koch supports the enrollment of children with HIV in New York City public schools

1986

- Gay rights bill that had been introduced six times by Mayor Ed Koch since 1978 is passed by the Council in 1986
- GMHC holds the first AIDS Walk in New York City. Over 4.500 people participate and raise US$710,000
- October: GMHC's client base expanded to include heterosexual men and women, hemophiliacs, intravenous drug-users, and children

1987

- Activists assemble to form ACT UP (AIDS Coalition To Unleash Power). The group's first action was a march on Wall Street protesting the costs and lack of availability of HIV treatment drugs
- The New York State Department of Health publishes a survey of maternal infection that indicates that 1 of every 61 women giving birth is infected with AIDS compared to one out of 749 in the rest of the state; prevailing in areas of poverty and minority residents (higher in the Bronx than on Staten Island)

1988

- New York City's healthcare and social welfare systems are becoming increasingly overwhelmed; 13 percent of the inpatient beds in facilities maintained by the Health and Hospitals Corporation are occupied by AIDS patients
- November: Koch supports the start of a needle exchange program

1989

- Over 2,000 New York City women through 1989 are labeled as being infected because of their own intravenous drug use. This number is over two and a half times higher that the women considered to have been infected by sex with a man at risk
- Towards the end of the 1980s, AIDS became the leading cause of death in New York City for men between the ages of 25 and 44 and black women between the ages of 15 and 44 years

== See also ==
- Epidemiology of HIV/AIDS
- People With AIDS Self-Empowerment Movement
- HIV/AIDS in North America
- HIV/AIDS in the United States
- HIV Clinical Resource
- List of disasters in New York City by death toll
