= HIV/AIDS in Atlanta =

Atlanta has a high prevalence of HIV infection, particularly in African Americans. In 2021, there were around 39,172 HIV positive people living in Atlanta (5% of the city population). In the same year, 1,453 people were just diagnosed with the disease. As of 2014, 12.1% of young gay/bi black men were diagnosed with HIV in Atlanta which is one of the highest rates in a First World major city. The Atlanta metropolitan area ranked third highest in new HIV diagnoses in the United States. 1 in 51 people have HIV in metro Atlanta. HIV cases are concentrated in Fulton, DeKalb, and Clayton counties.

== See also ==
- HIV/AIDS in New York City
- HIV/AIDS in the United States
