= HIV/AIDS in the United States =

HIV/AIDS epidemic in the United States

CDC Infographics

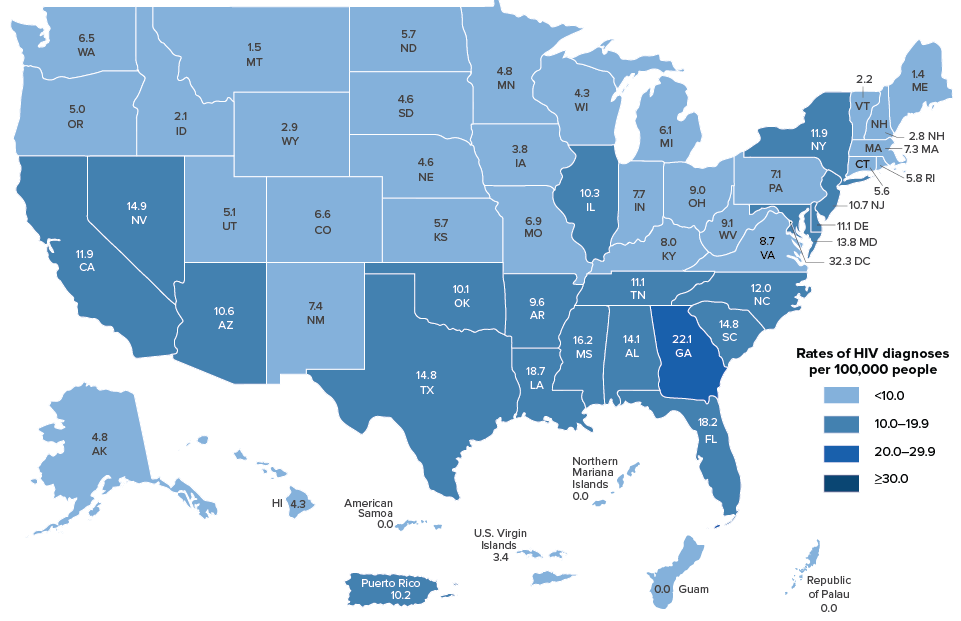
Rates of HIV/AIDS diagnoses in the United States, 2017

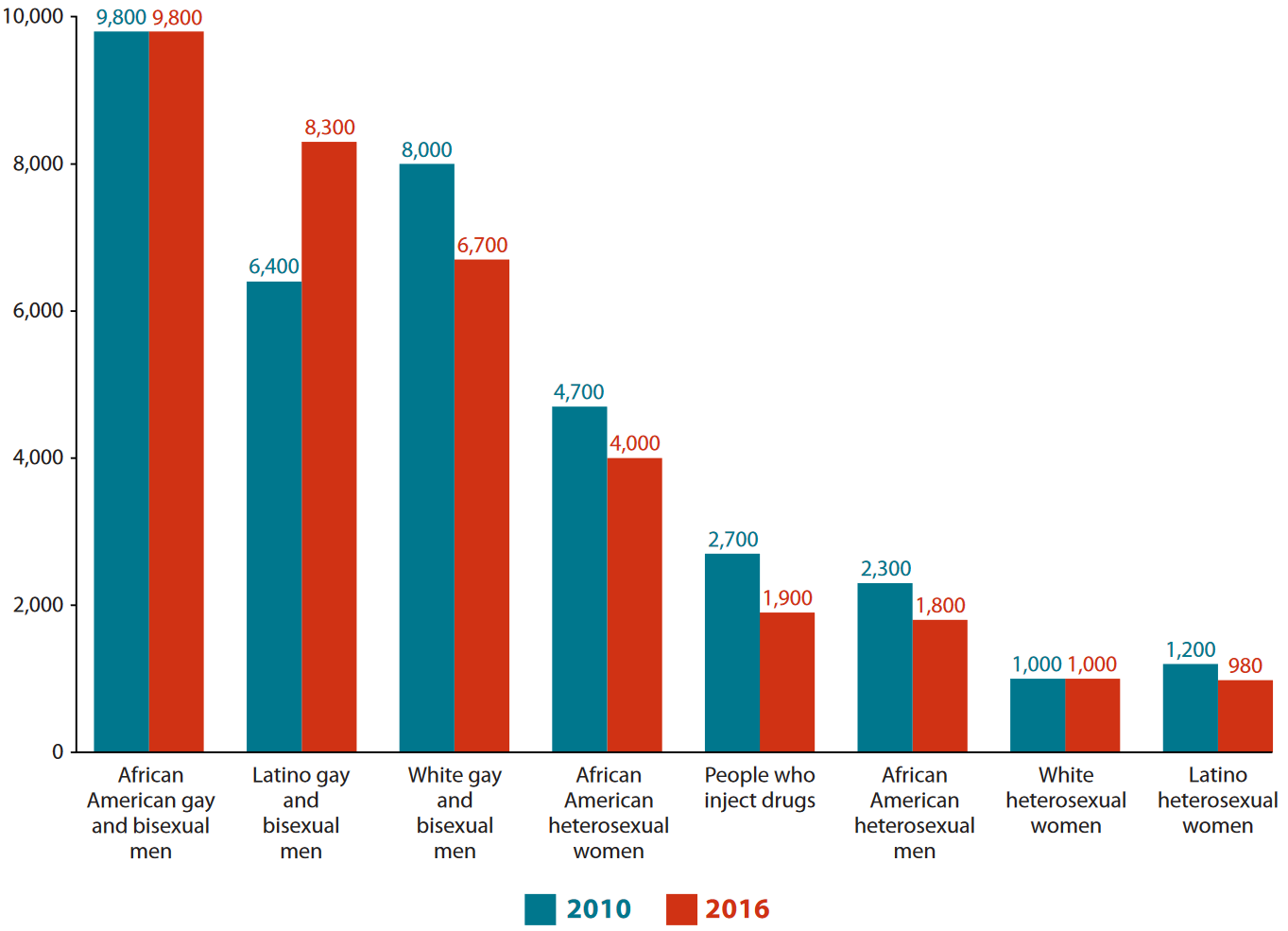
New HIV infections by race and transmission group in the US, 2010–2016

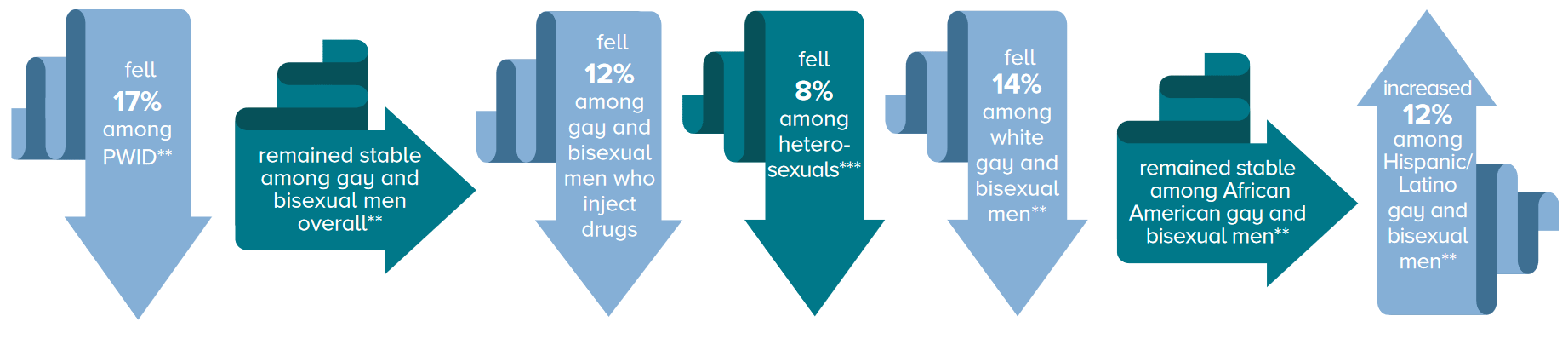
HIV diagnosis trends in the US and dependent areas, 2012–2016

Estimated number of HIV/AIDS cases in the US in 2007, by transmission category

The AIDS epidemic, caused by the emergence and spread of the human immunodeficiency virus (HIV), developed in the United States between the 1970s and 1980s. It was first noticed after doctors discovered clusters of Kaposi's sarcoma and pneumocystis pneumonia in homosexual men in Los Angeles, New York City, and San Francisco in 1981. Treatment of HIV/AIDS is primarily via the use of multiple antiretroviral drugs, and education programs to help people avoid infection. Initially, infected foreign nationals were turned back at the United States border to help prevent additional infections.

The number of United States deaths from AIDS has declined sharply since the early years of the disease's presentation domestically. According to 2023 data, there was a 12% decrease in the amount of new HIV infections compared to 2018.

In the United States in 2016, 1.1 million people aged over 13 lived with an HIV infection, of whom 14% were unaware of their infection. African Americans, Hispanic/Latino Americans, homosexual and bisexual men, transgender women, and intravenous drug users remain the most disproportionately affected populations in the United States.

== Mortality and morbidity ==
As of 2018, about 700,000 people have died of HIV/AIDS in the United States since the beginning of the HIV/AIDS epidemic, and nearly 13,000 people with AIDS in the United States die each year.

With improved treatments and better prophylaxis against opportunistic infections, death rates have significantly declined.

The overall death rate among persons diagnosed with HIV/AIDS in New York City decreased by sixty-two percent from 2001 to 2012.

== Containment ==
After the HIV/AIDS outbreak in the 1980s, various responses emerged in an effort to alleviate the issue. These included new medical treatments, travel restrictions, and new public health policies in the United States.

=== Medical treatment ===
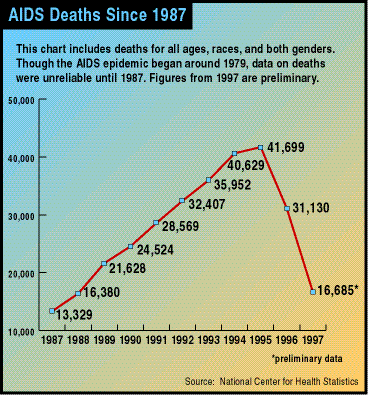
A chart of AIDS deaths in the United States from 1987 to 1997

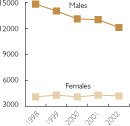
A chart of AIDS deaths in the United States from 1998 to 2002

Great progress was made in the US following the introduction of three-drug anti-HIV treatments ("cocktails") that included antiretroviral drugs. David Ho, a pioneer of this approach, was honored as Time magazine Man of the Year for 1996. Deaths were rapidly reduced by more than half, with a small but welcome reduction in the yearly rate of new HIV infections. Since this time, AIDS deaths have continued to decline, but much more slowly, and not as completely in African Americans as in other population segments.

=== Travel restrictions ===
In 1987, the Department of Health and Human Services (HHS) included HIV in its list of "communicable diseases of public health significance," denying immigrants and short-term foreign visits from anyone who tested positive for the virus. In 1993, the US Congress passed the National Institutes of Health Revitalization Act of 1993, removing the HHS' authority to dictate HIV as a "public health significance," and explicitly including HIV as a cause for denying immigrants and foreign visitors entry into the US. Anyone seeking US citizenship during the HIV ban was required to undergo a medical exam during the legalization process – testing positive would permanently deny the applicant entry into the country. The law extended to include medication, where foreign travelers could be arrested for having antiretroviral drugs in their carry-on luggage. A famous example was in 1989, when a Dutch traveler to Minnesota was arrested for "several days" because he was carrying AZT in his luggage.

During the turn of the 21st century, people who were HIV positive and seeking temporary visas or vacationing to the US had to avoid revealing their status on application forms, and either plan for their medication to be sent to the US or stop taking their medication. Eventually the US began offering temporary admission waivers for people who were HIV positive. As stated in an interoffice memorandum in 2004, foreign nationals who were HIV positive could qualify for the waiver for either humanitarian/public interest reasons, or being "attendees of certain designated international events held in the United States".

In early December 2006, President George W. Bush indicated that he would issue an executive order allowing HIV positive people to enter the United States on standard visas. It was unclear whether applicants would still have to declare their HIV status.

In August 2007, Congresswoman Barbara Lee of California introduced H.R. 3337, the HIV Nondiscrimination in Travel and Immigration Act of 2007. This bill allowed travelers and immigrants entry to the United States without having to disclose their HIV status. The bill died at the end of the 110th Congress.

In July 2008, President George W. Bush signed H.R. 5501 that lifted the ban in statutory law. However, the United States Department of Health and Human Services still held the ban in administrative (written regulation) law. New impetus was added to repeal efforts when Paul Thorn, a UK tuberculosis expert who was invited to speak at the 2009 Pacific Health Summit in Seattle, was denied a visa due to his HIV positive status. A letter written by Mr. Thorn, and read in his place at the Summit, was obtained by Congressman Jim McDermott, who advocated the issue to the Obama administration's Health Secretary.

On October 30, 2009, President Barack Obama reauthorized the Ryan White HIV/AIDS Bill which expanded care and treatment through federal funding to nearly half a million. The Department of Health and Human Services also crafted regulation that would end the HIV Travel and Immigration Ban, effective in January 2010. On January 4, 2010, the United States Department of Health and Human Services and Centers for Disease Control and Prevention removed HIV infection from the list of "communicable diseases of public health significance," due to its not being spread by casual contact, air, food or water, and removed HIV status as a factor to be considered in the granting of travel visas, disallowing HIV status from among the diseases that could prevent people who were not US citizens from entering the country.

=== Public health policies ===
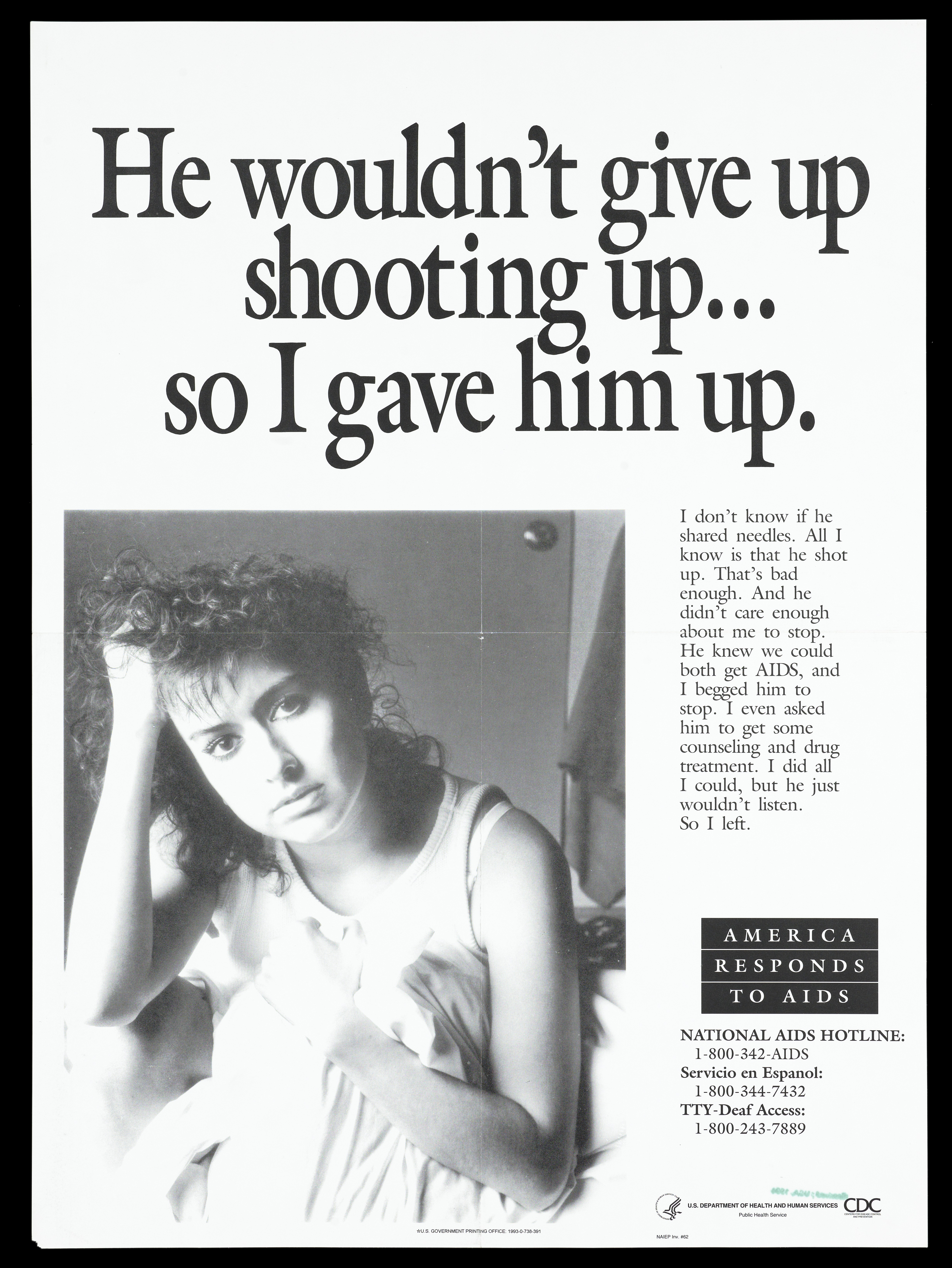
1993 poster for "America responds to AIDS", a campaign by the US Department of Health and Human Services

Since the beginning of the HIV/AIDS epidemic, several US presidents have attempted to implement a national plan to control the issue. In 1987, Ronald Reagan created a Presidential Commission on the HIV Epidemic. This commission was recruited to investigate what steps are necessary for responding to the HIV/AIDS outbreak in the country, and the consensus was to establish more HIV testing, focus on prevention and treatment as well as expanding HIV care throughout the United States. However, these changes were not implemented during this time, and the commission recommendations were largely ignored.

Another attempt to respond to the HIV/AIDS outbreak took place in 1996, when Bill Clinton established the National AIDS Strategy, which aimed to reduce the number of infections, enhance research on HIV treatment, increase access to resources for people affected by AIDS, and also alleviate the racial disparities in HIV treatment and care. In Vancouver, the 11th International AIDS Conference highlighted the effectiveness of highly active antiretroviral therapy (HAART), thus creating a new period of optimism. 1996 would mark the first year since the beginning of the epidemic that the number of new HIV/AIDS cases would decline. AIDS was now no longer the leading cause of death in Americans aged 25-44, although it remained the leading cause of death for African Americans in this age group. The AIDS Memorial Quilt would be displayed in its entirety for the last time on the National Mall in October 1996. 1997 would mark the first time that the number of AIDS-related deaths would substantially decline, with the US Centers for Disease Control and Prevention (CDC) reporting a 47% decline in AIDS-related deaths compared to the previous year. The effectiveness of drug therapy such as HAART would be credited for this significant decline in new cases and deaths.

In 2010, Barack Obama created the National HIV/AIDS Strategy for the United States (NHAS), with its three main objectives being to reduce the annual number of HIV infections, reduce health disparities, and increase access to resources and HIV care. However, this new strategy differs in that it includes an Implementation Plan, with a timeline for achieving each of the three goals, as well as a document outlining the specific action plan that will be used.

In 2019, Donald Trump announced a plan in his State of the Union Address to stop new HIV infections in the United States by 2030, though critics pointed to the President's policies reducing access to health insurance, anti-immigrant and anti-transgender policies as undermining this goal. The Department of Health and Human Services issued grants to 32 HIV "hotspots" in 2019, and Congress earmarked over $291 million for the president's plan in FY2020.

In February 2019, US District Court Judge Leonie Brinkema issued a temporary order barring the US military for discharging or denying officer commissions to personnel based on HIV status. Judge Brinkema's order became permanent in April 2022.

Funding for HIV initiatives has been reduced by 25%, amounting to $2 billion in 2025, as a consequence of diminished support under the Trump administration. This allocation represents the lowest level of funding since 2007 and may contribute to a potential resurgence of the virus.

== Public health response in California ==
California has been one of the leading states when it comes to addressing the AIDS epidemic. Since the early 1980s, it has been one of the first to implement statewide policies to fund testing, education, and treatment. In 1985, the state established the Office of AIDS under the California Department of Health Services to coordinate prevention and care efforts statewide. By 1999, California had expanded the Medi-Cal coverage to include a broader range of HIV-related treatments, which also made it one of the first states to do this. California's investment in the syringe exchange programs and different harm reduction services also has contributed to the declines in HIV transmission among intravenous drug users.

== Demographics and health disparities ==
Despite there being major public health funding, disparities in HIV/AIDS rates continue to rise across racial and socioeconomic lines in California. According to the California Department of Public Health, only 6% of the state's population is made up of African American individuals, yet they accounted for 17% of new HIV diagnoses in 2022. Similarly, Latino communities, mainly in Southern California, face very high infection rates. Many public health officials attribute this to the limited access to healthcare that is culturally appropriate, barriers in language, and low rates of viral suppression. Rural areas in California, like the Central Valley, have persistent HIV disparities, including higher rates of new cases and lower viral suppression. This is due to barriers in access to care, limited provider access, and socioeconomic challenges. Public health professionals and advocates are arguing that to close these gaps, especially in communities as described prior, it requires sustained investment in outreach that is culturally competent, expanded access to PrEP, and an increased use of telehealth services that can reach these populations who may have limited provider access, like the Central Valley.

=== Localized efforts ===
Local health educators found it upon themselves to promote modes of safe sex amongst gay men, bisexual men, and other men who have sex with men (MSM) to combat the HIV/AIDS epidemic. In 1987, Les Pappas, an educator from the San Francisco AIDS Foundation (SFAF), spoke at a conference encouraging gay and bisexual men to use condoms during sexual intercourse. In Pappas' speech, he takes it as the community's responsibility to educate men on using condoms, alluding to the degree of educating gay men as if they had no idea how to use condoms or were even aware of the existence of condoms at all.

Pappas saw opening the eyes of the gay community to condoms would create a successful economic "gay market" that was unprecedented for the San Francisco Bay Area. Where he saw bringing attention to buying and using condoms, Pappas also believed that seeing condom paraphernalia would make gay men embrace their sexuality more, thus practicing safer sex.

== Public perception ==
The number of people living with HIV in the United States, and the number of deaths caused by AIDS by year (1980–2015)

During the HIV/AIDS epidemic of the 1980s, LGBTQ+ communities were further stigmatized as they became the focus of mass hysteria, suffered isolation and marginalization, and were targeted with extreme acts of violence in the United States. One of the best known works on the history of HIV/AIDS is the 1987 book And the Band Played On by Randy Shilts, which contends that Ronald Reagan's administration dragged its feet in dealing with the crisis due to homophobia, while the gay community viewed early reports and public health measures with corresponding distrust, thus allowing the disease to spread further and infect hundreds of thousands more. This resulted in the formation of the AIDS Coalition to Unleash Power (ACT UP) by Larry Kramer. Galvanized by the US federal government's inactivity, the movement led by AIDS activists to gain funding for HIV/AIDS research, which on a per-patient basis out-paced funding for more prevalent diseases such as cancer and heart disease, was used as a model for future lobbying for health research funding.

An early theory asserted that a series of inoculations against hepatitis B that were performed in the gay community of San Francisco were tainted with HIV. Although there was a high correlation between recipients of that vaccination and initial cases of AIDS, this theory has long been discredited. However, the theory has never been officially proven or disproven. HIV, hepatitis B, and hepatitis C are bloodborne diseases with very similar modes of transmission, and those at risk for one are at risk for the others.

Publicity campaigns were started in attempts to counter the incorrect and often vitriolic perception of AIDS as a "gay plague". These included the Ryan White case, red ribbon campaigns, celebrity dinners, the 1993 film version of And the Band Played On, sex education programs in schools, and television advertisements. Announcements by various celebrities that they had contracted HIV (including actor Rock Hudson, basketball star Magic Johnson, tennis player Arthur Ashe and singer Freddie Mercury) were significant in arousing media attention and making the general public aware of the dangers of the disease to people of all sexual orientations.

== Perspective of doctors ==
The global spread of HIV/AIDS was met with great fear and concern by the American population in the 1980s, and those who were primarily affected were African Americans, Hispanic/Latino Americans, homosexual and bisexual men, and intravenous drug users. During the early years of the epidemic, doctors began to not treat patients affected with HIV/AIDS, not only to create distance from these groups of people, but also because they were afraid to contract the disease themselves. At the time, a surgeon in Milwaukee stated: "I've got to be selfish. It's an incurable disease that's uniformly fatal, and I'm constantly at risk for getting it. I've got to think about myself. I've got to think about my family. That responsibility is greater than to the patient."

Some doctors thought it was their duty to stay away from the risk of contracting HIV because they had other patients to think of. In a survey of doctors in the mid to late 1980s, a substantial number of physicians indicated that they did not have an ethical obligation to treat and care for those patients affected with HIV/AIDS. A study of primary care providers showed that half would not care for patients if they were given a choice. In 1990, a national survey of doctors showed that "only 24% believed that office-based practitioners should be legally required to provide care to individuals with HIV infection." Nonetheless, there were many doctors who chose to care for patients affected with HIV/AIDS for different reasons: they shared the same sexual orientation as the infected; a commitment to providing care to the diseased; an interest in the mysteries of infectious disease; and/or a desire to tame the awful threat.

== By race and ethnicity ==
=== African Americans ===
African Americans are the ethnic group most disproportionately affected by HIV/AIDS, compared with other races and ethnicities in the United States. They represented approximately 12% of the US population in 2018, but accounted for an estimated 43% of new HIV infections in 2017. Furthermore, they make up nearly 52% of AIDS-related deaths in the United States. A 2006 report from the Centers for Disease Control and Prevention (CDC) estimated that about half of the 1 million US citizens living with HIV/AIDS were African–American. A 2010 study published on the American Journal of Public Health reported that 64% of women infected with HIV/AIDS in the United States were African–American. In 2019, African–American and multiracial populations experienced the highest reported homelessness rates of any other ethnic or racial group diagnosed with HIV/AIDS in the United States. In the year 2021, approximately 60% of new HIV diagnoses among women in the United States were represented by Black women.

==== Risk factors contributing to the Black HIV/AIDS rate ====
The United States has a mixed private/public health system, with more privatization than most other developed countries. Access to healthcare services is very important in preventing and treating HIV/AIDS among the US population. It can be affected by health insurance which is available to people through private insurers, Medicare and Medicaid, which leaves many US citizens still vulnerable and untreated. Historically, African Americans have faced discrimination when it comes to receiving healthcare.

Homosexuality is viewed negatively within the African-American community: "In a qualitative study of 745 racially and ethnic diverse undergraduates attending a large Midwestern university, Calzo and Ward (2009) determined that parents of African-American participants discussed homosexuality more frequently than the parents of other respondents. In analyses of the values communicated, Calzo and Ward (2009) reported that Black parents offered greater indication that homosexuality is perverse and unnatural".

Homosexuality is also seen as a threat to African-American empowerment. Masculinity is seen as important for the African-American community because it shows that the community is in control of their own destiny. Since the social stigma circling homosexuality is that it is considered "effeminate", then homosexuality is seen as a threat to masculinity in the African-American community: "Black manhood, then, depends on men's ability to be provider, progenitor, and protector. But, as the Black male performance of parts of this script is thwarted by economic and cultural factors, the performance of Black masculinity becomes predicated on a particular performance of Black sexuality and avoidance of weakness and femininity. If sexuality remains one of the few ways that Black men can recapture a masculinity withheld from them in the marketplace, endorsing Black homosexuality subverts the cultural project of reinscribing masculinity within the Black community." This critical view is influenced by internalized homophobia: "Internalized homophobia is defined as the lesbian, gay, or bisexual individual's inward direction of society's homophobic attitudes (Meyer 1995)."

A homophobic culture and discrimination towards LGBTQ+ people is sustained in the African-American community further through the involvement of Black churches and congregations, because religion is a vital part of the African-American community: "As reported by Peterson and Jones (2009), AA MSM tended to be more involved with religious communities than NHW MSM." Because Christianity reiterates homosexuality as a sin and social stigma, the African-American community has higher rates of internalized homophobia. This internalized homophobia causes a lower chance of HIV/AIDS education on prevention and care within the African-American community.

==== "Down-low" subculture among Black MSM ====
Down-low is an African-American slang term specifically used within the African-American community that typically refers to a sexual subculture of Black men who usually identify as heterosexual but actively seek sexual encounters and relations with other men, practice gay cruising, and frequently adopt a specific hip-hop attire during these activities. They generally avoid disclosing their same-sex sexual activities, and often have female sexual partner(s), and may be married or single.

In medical research, the term down-low is used to identify sexual identity-behaviour discordance among men who have sex with men (MSM). According to a study published in the Journal of Bisexuality, "[t]he Down Low is a lifestyle predominately practiced by young, urban Black men who have sex with other men and women, yet do not identify as gay or bisexual".

In this context, "being on the down-low" is more than just men having sex with men in secret, or a variant of closeted homosexuality or bisexuality—it is a sexual identity that is, at least partly, defined by its "cult of masculinity" and its rejection of what is perceived as White American culture (including what is perceived as White American LGBT culture) and terms. A 2003 cover story in The New York Times Magazine on the down-low phenomenon explains that the American Black community sees "homosexuality as a white man's perversion." It then goes on to describe the down-low subculture as follows:

Rejecting a gay culture they perceive as white and effeminate, many black men have settled on a new identity, with its own vocabulary and customs and its own name: Down Low. There have always been men – black and white – who have had secret sexual lives with men. But the creation of an organized, underground subculture largely made up of black men who otherwise live straight lives is a phenomenon of the last decade. ... Most date or marry women and engage sexually with men they meet only in anonymous settings like bathhouses and parks or through the Internet. Many of these men are young and from the inner city, where they live in a hypermasculine thug culture. Other DL men form romantic relationships with men and may even be peripheral participants in mainstream gay culture, all unknown to their colleagues and families. Most DL men identify themselves not as gay or bisexual but first and foremost as black. To them, as to many blacks, that equates to being inherently masculine.

The CDC cited three findings that relate to African-American men who operate on the down-low (engage in MSM activity but don't disclose to others):

- African American men who have sex with men (MSM), but who do not disclose their sexual orientation (nondisclosers), have a high prevalence of HIV infection (14%); nearly three times higher than nondisclosing MSMs of other races/ethnicities (5%).
- Confirming previous research, the study of 5,589 MSM, aged 15–29 years, in six US cities found that African American MSM were more likely not to disclose their sexual orientation compared with white MSM (18% vs. 8%).
- HIV-infected nondisclosers were less likely to know their HIV status (98% were unaware of their infection compared with 75% of HIV-positive disclosers), and more likely to have had recent female sex partners.

=== Hispanic and Latino Americans ===
Hispanic and Latino Americans are the second ethnic group most disproportionately affected by HIV/AIDS. The annual number of Hispanics/Latinos newly diagnosed with HIV infection has increased by 7% between 2012 and 2016. Specific Hispanic/Latino populations most heavily affected by HIV/AIDS are men who have sex with men (MSM), accounting for approximately 80% of estimated HIV incidence among Hispanics/Latinos, followed by transgender Hispanic/Latina women and recent Hispanic/Latino immigrants. Hispanics/Latinos represented 16% of the US population but accounted for 21% of new HIV infections in 2010. This disparity is even more apparent among Hispanic/Latina women, which represent 13% of the population but account for 20% of reported HIV/AIDS cases among women in the United States. Hispanic and Latino Americans accounted for 20% of people living with HIV infection in 2011. Disparities persist in the estimated rate of new HIV infections in Hispanic and Latino Americans In 2010, the rate of new HIV infections for Hispanic/Latino men was 2.9 times that for White American men, and the rate of new infections for Hispanic/Latina women was 4.2 times that for White American women. Since the epidemic began, more than 100,888 Hispanic and Latino Americans with an AIDS diagnosis have died, including 2,863 in 2016.

=== Native Americans ===
Native American communities in the United States see a higher rate of HIV/AIDS in comparison to White Americans, Asian Americans, Native Hawaiians and other Pacific Islander Americans. Although Native Americans with HIV/AIDS only represent roughly 1% of positive cases in the US population, the number of diagnoses among Native American gay and bisexual men rose by 54% between 2011 and 2015. Additionally, the survival rate of diagnosed Native Americans was the lowest of all races in the United States between 1998 and 2005.

In recent years, the Centers for Disease Control and Prevention (CDC) have put in place a "high impact prevention approach" in partnership with the Indian Health Service and the CDC Tribal Advisory Committee to tackle the growing rates in a culturally appropriate way. The higher rate of HIV/AIDS cases among Native Americans have been attributed to a number of factors, including socioeconomic disadvantages faced by Native American communities, which may result in difficulty accessing healthcare and high-quality housing. It may be more difficult for Native American gay and bisexual men to access healthcare due to living in rural communities, or due to stigma attached to their sexualities. Native Americans have been reported to have higher rates of other STIs, including chlamydia and gonorrhea, which also increases likeliness of contracting or transmitting HIV.

As there are over 570 federally recognized Native American tribes, there is some difficulty in creating outreach programs which effectively appeal to all tribes whilst remaining culturally appropriate. As well as fear of social stigma from within Native American communities, there may also be a fear among LGBTQ+ Native Americans of a lack of understanding from health professionals in the United States, particularly among Two-Spirit Native Americans. A 2013 NASTAD report calls for the inclusion of LGBTQ+ and Two-Spirit Native American peoples in HIV/AIDS program planning and asserts that "health departments should utilize local experts to better understand regional definitions of "Two Spirit" and incorporate modules on Native gay men and Two Spirit people into cultural sensitivity courses for public health service providers".

=== Racial disparities related to HIV/AIDS treatment ===
While there is no cure for HIV/AIDS as of yet, prevention methods and access to medical care are major ways to know one's HIV status, become virally undetectable, and prevent transmission of HIV/AIDS. There are prevention methods to help reduce HIV rates in the United States but these methods are not equally available or accessed. A 2020 study published on the American Journal of Public Health reported that the social stigma associated with HIV diagnosis is a "major barrier" that prevents many at-risk and HIV-positive patients from accessing services of HIV prevention and treatment. One prevention method is PrEP, which is a medication taken orally or an injection that prevents HIV transmission. According to the CDC, Pre-exposure prophlyaxis or PrEP usage rates varied significantly by reported race and ethnicity in 2019. For example, out of all the total number of individuals on PrEP, 63% of them identified as White Americans, 8% identified as African Americans, 14% identified as Hispanic and Latino Americans, and 9% identified as other.

Healthcare access varies greatly by race and ethnicity in the United States. Out of those living with HIV/AIDS who received medical care only 63% of Native Americans, 61% of African Americans, 65% of Hispanic and Latino Americans, and 85% of Native Hawaiians and other Pacific Islander Americans were virally suppressed in 2019. This is in comparison to 71% of White Americans who were virally suppressed in 2019 according to the CDC. African–American, Hispanic/Latino, and multiracial populations were significantly more likely to miss at least one medical appointment in the past year compared with White American populations. African–American, Hispanic/Latino, and multiracial populations that were diagnosed with HIV/AIDS in the United States in 2019 all experienced higher need of dental care, SNAP or WIC benefits, shelter or housing services, and/or mental health services than White American populations according to the CDC.

==== National HIV/AIDS strategy ====
The 2022–2025 National HIV/AIDS strategy "recognizes racism as a serious public health threat that drives and affects both HIV outcomes and disparities", and while every part of the US is threatened with the HIV/AIDS epidemic, "certain populations bear most of the burden signaling where our HIV prevention, care, and treatment efforts must be focused." The 2022–2025 National HIV/AIDS strategy focuses on five priority populations including: gay men, bisexual men, and other men who have sex with men (MSM), in particular African–American, Hispanic/Latino, and Native American men; African–American women; transgender women; youth aged 13–24 years; and people who inject drugs.

Sex education varies throughout the United States and in some areas could use more informative measures. Sex education on HIV prevention has decreased from 64% (2000) to 41% (2014). Out of the 50 states, 26 put a larger emphasis on abstinence sex education. Abstinence-only sex education is correlated to increasing rates of HIV/AIDS infections, especially among teenagers and young adults.

== Activism and response ==
Starting in the early 1980s, HIV/AIDS activist groups and organizations began to emerge and advocate for people infected with HIV in the United States. Though it was an important aspect of the movement, activism went beyond the pursuit of funding for HIV/AIDS research. These groups acted to educate and raise awareness of the disease and its effects on different populations, even those thought to be at low-risk of contracting HIV/AIDS. This was done through publications and "alternative media" created by those living with or close to the disease.

In contrast to this "alternative media" created by activist groups, mass media reports on HIV/AIDS were not as prevalent, most likely due to the stigma surrounding the topic. The general public was therefore not exposed to information regarding the disease. In addition, the federal government and laws in place essentially prevented individuals affected by HIV/AIDS from getting sufficient information about the disease. Risk reduction education was not easily accessible, so activist groups took action in releasing information to the public through these publications.

AIDS activist groups worked to prevent spread of HIV by distributing information about safe sex. They also existed to support people living with HIV/AIDS, offering therapy, support groups, and hospice care. Organizations like Gay Men's Health Crisis, People With AIDS, Proyecto ContraSIDA por Vida, the Lesbian AIDS Project, and SisterLove were created to address the needs of certain populations living with HIV/AIDS. Other groups, like the NAMES Project, emerged as a way of memorializing those who had passed, refusing to let them be forgotten by the historical narrative. One group, the Association for Drug Abuse Prevention and Treatment (ADAPT), headed by Yolanda Serrano, coordinated with their local prison, Riker's Island Correctional Facility, to advocate for those imprisoned and HIV positive to be released early, so that they could die in the comfort of their own homes.

Both men and women, heterosexual and LGBTQ+ populations were active in establishing and maintaining these parts of the movement. Because HIV/AIDS was initially thought only to impact gay men, most narratives of activism focus on their contributions to the movement. However, women also played a significant role in raising awareness, rallying for change, and caring for those impacted by the disease. Lesbian women helped organize and spread information about transmission between women, as well as supporting gay men in their work. Narratives of activism also tend to focus on organizing done in coastal cities, but AIDS activism was present and widespread across both urban and more rural areas of the United States. Organizers sought to address needs specific to their communities, whether that was working to establish needle exchange programs, fighting against housing or employment discrimination, or issues faced primarily by people identified as members of specific groups (such as sex workers, mothers and children, or incarcerated people).

During the HIV/AIDS epidemic of the 1980s, LGBTQ+ communities were further stigmatized as they became the focus of mass hysteria, suffered isolation and marginalization, and were targeted with extreme acts of violence in the United States. Initially when the HIV/AIDS epidemic surfaced in the United States, a large proportion of patients were members of the LGBTQ+ community, leading to further stigmatization of the disease. Because of this, the AIDS activist groups took initiative in testing and experimenting with new possible medications for treating HIV, after researchers outside of the community refused. This research originally done by early AIDS activist groups contributed to treatments still being used today.

Among the landmark legal cases in the history of LGBT rights in the United States on the topic of HIV/AIDS is Braschi vs. Stahl. Litigant Miguel Braschi sued his landlord for the right to continue living in their rent controlled apartment after his gay partner Leslie Blanchard died of AIDS. The NY Court of Appeals became the first American appellate court to conclude that same-sex relationships are entitled to legal recognition. The case was litigated at the height of the AIDS crisis and the plaintiff himself died only a year after his groundbreaking court victory. The case focused on emotional and economic interdependency rather than on the existence of legal formalities; the verdict made it more difficult for government officials to reject the notion that same-sex couples could constitute families and that they were entitled to at least some of the protections afforded by law.

=== Response from the Catholic Church ===
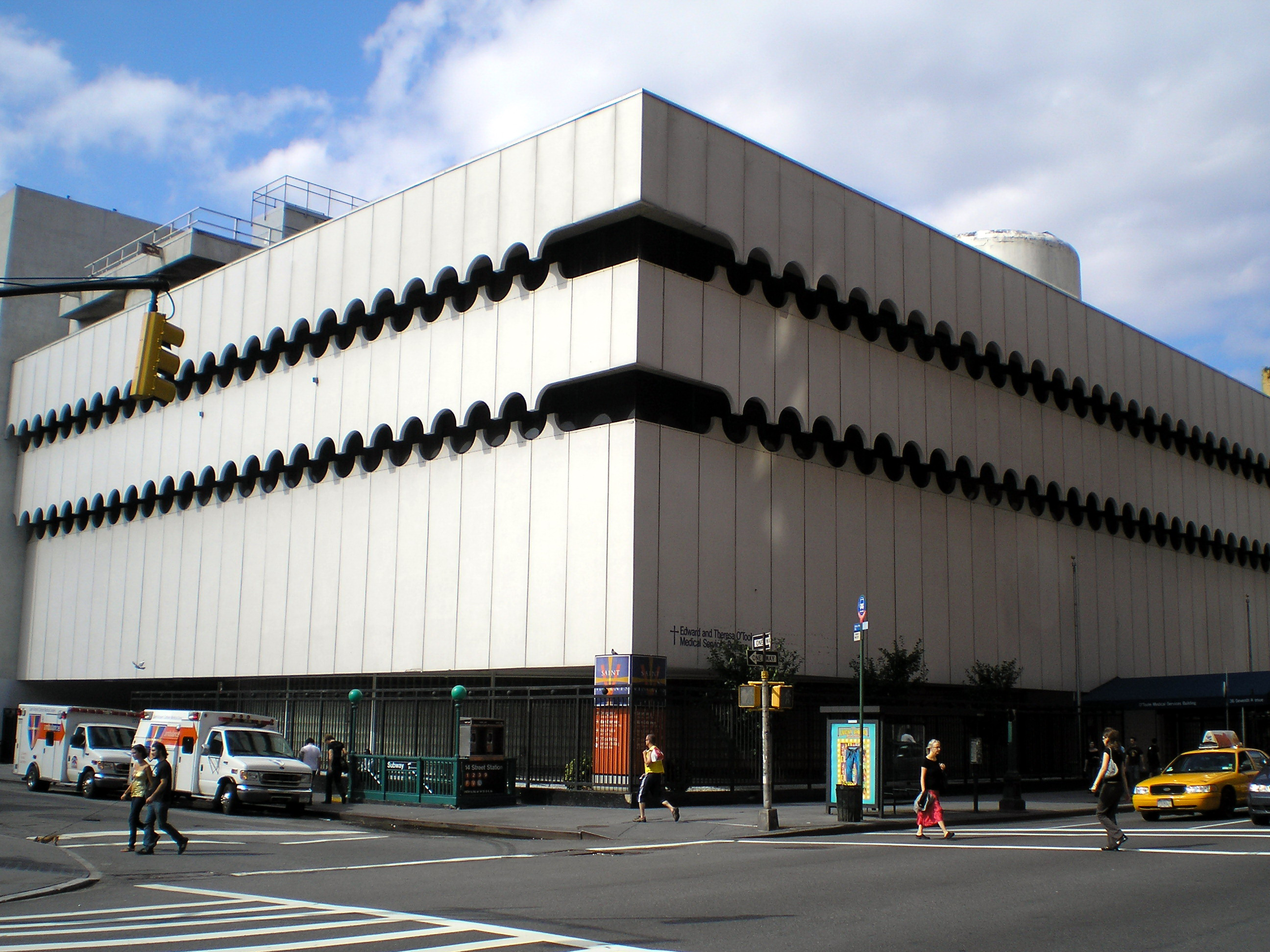
St Vincent's Hospital and Medical Center of New York was one of many Catholic health institutions to pioneer medical treatment for people infected with HIV/AIDS.

The United States Conference of Catholic Bishops was the first church body to address the HIV/AIDS pandemic in 1987, a full 7 years into the pandemic, with a document entitled "The Many Faces of AIDS: A Gospel Response." In the document they stated that the Catholic Church must provide pastoral care to those infected with HIV/AIDS as well as medical care. It called discrimination against people with AIDS "unjust and immoral". The document also rejected extra-marital sex and the use of condoms, and reiterated the Church's teaching that human sexuality was a gift and was to be used in monogamous marriages.

The Catholic Church, with over 117,000 health centers, is the largest private provider of HIV/AIDS care. Individual dioceses around the United States began hiring staff in the 1980s to coordinate AIDS ministry. By 2008, Catholic Charities USA had 1,600 agencies providing services to patients with AIDS, including housing and mental health services. The Archdiocese of New York opened a shelter for AIDS patients in 1985. In the same year, they opened a hotline for people to call for resources and information. The Missionaries of Charity, led by Mother Teresa, opened hospices in the Greenwich Village neighborhood of New York, Washington D.C., and San Francisco in the 1980s. Individual parishes began opening hospices for AIDS patients, with the first being in New Orleans in 1985.

The bishops of the United States issued a pastoral letter in the 1980s, titled A Call to Compassion, saying those with AIDS "deserve to remain within our communal consciousness and to be embraced with unconditional love." In Always Our Children, their 1997 pastoral letter on homosexuality, the American bishops noted "an importance and urgency" to minister to those with AIDS, especially considering the impact it had on the gay community. They encouraged church ministers to include prayers at Mass for those with AIDS and those who care for them, those who have died from AIDS, and all of their friends, families, and companions. They recommended special masses be said for healing with anointing of the sick or other events to take place around the time of World AIDS Day.

In 1987, the bishops of California issued a document saying that just as Jesus loved and healed lepers, the blind, the lame, and others, so too should Catholics care for those with AIDS. The year before, they publicly denounced Proposition 64, a measure pushed by Lyndon H. LaRouche to forcibly quarantine those with AIDS, and encouraged Catholics to vote against it. Joseph L. Bernardin, the Archbishop of Chicago, issued a 12-page policy paper in 1986 that outlined "sweeping pastoral initiatives" his archdiocese would be undertaking.

=== Present-day activism ===
An effective response to HIV/AIDS requires that groups of vulnerable populations have access to HIV prevention programs with information and services that are specific to them. In the present day, some AIDS activist groups and organizations that were established during the height of the epidemic are still present and working to assist people living with HIV/AIDS. They may offer any combination of the following: health education, counseling and support, or advocacy for law and policy. AIDS activist groups and organizations also continue to call for public awareness and support through participation in events like LGBT pride parades, World AIDS Day, and AIDS Walks.

== Current status ==
The Centers for Disease Control and Prevention estimates at the end of 2019, there were 1,189,700 people aged 13 or older with diagnosed HIV infections in the United States and dependent areas. Since 2010, the number of people living with HIV/AIDS has increased, while the annual number of new HIV infections has declined over the past few years. In 2021, 36,136 people were newly diagnosed with HIV/AIDS, compared to 37,832 diagnosed in 2018. 67% of 2021 diagnoses were among men who have sex with men (MSM), 56% were among American early adolescents and young adults between the ages of 13 and 34, 40% were from the African-American population, and 7% were intravenous drug users.

The 2021 CDC HIV Surveillance Report estimates that 36,136 new cases of HIV infections were diagnosed in the United States in 2021, a rate of 11.3 per 100,000 population. This rate is an increase from the previous year's estimates, which indicated 30,585 new infections and a rate of 9.5 per 100,000 population. This increase has been peculiar among epidemiologists, since over the past few years before 2021, rates of HIV infections were decreasing over time. Due to the COVID-19 pandemic in the United States (2019–2022), many barriers have made getting tested for HIV/AIDS more difficult, with many who are racially and economically disadvantaged to have reduced resources in terms of testing.

Individuals in the 25–29 age range had the highest rates of new HIV infections, with a rate of 32.9 per 100,000. With regard to race and ethnicity, the highest rate of new HIV infections in 2017 occurred in the African-American population, with a rate of 4.5 per 100,000. This more than doubled the next highest rate of new HIV infections for a racial or ethnic group, which was the Hispanic/Latino population, with a rate of 3.2 per 100,000. The lowest rate of new HIV infections in 2021 occurred in the Asian American population, with a rate of 2.3 per 100,000.

According to CDC estimates, the most common transmission category of new HIV infections remained male-to-male sexual contact, which accounted for roughly 79% of all new infections in the United States in 2021. Among the proportion of new HIV-positive gay and bisexual men in 2021, 40% are African Americans, 29% are Hispanic/Latino Americans, and 25% are White Americans. With regard to region of residence, the highest rates of new infections in 2021 occurred in the Southern United States, with about 52% of new total cases being from the American South. The region identified as "American South" includes Alabama, Arkansas, Delaware, District of Columbia, Florida, Georgia, Kentucky, Louisiana, Maryland, Mississippi, North Carolina, Oklahoma, South Carolina, Tennessee, Texas, Virginia, and West Virginia. The city of Atlanta has the highest HIV infection rate in the country.

According to CDC estimates, the majority of new HIV infections among White Americans occurred among adult men who have sex with men (MSM) aged 30–39, followed closely by those aged 40–49, while the majority of new HIV infections among African Americans have occurred predominantly among early adolescent and young adult men who have sex with men (aged 13–29). In the United States, men who have sex with men (MSM), described as gay and bisexual men, make up about 55% of the total HIV-positive population, and 83% of the estimated new HIV/AIDS diagnoses among all males aged 13 and older, and approximately 92% of new HIV/AIDS diagnoses among all men in their age group. 1 in 6 gay and bisexual men are therefore expected to be diagnosed with HIV/AIDS in their lifetime if current rates continue. The CDC estimates that more than 600,000 gay and bisexual men are currently living with HIV/AIDS in the United States. A review of four studies in which trans women in the United States were tested for HIV/AIDS found that 27.7% tested positive.

In 2015, a major HIV infection outbreak, Indiana's largest-ever, occurred in two largely rural, economically depressed and poor counties in the southern portion of the state, due to the injection of a relatively new opioid-type drug called Opana (oxymorphone), which is designed be taken in pill form but is ground up and injected intravenously using needles. Because of the lack of HIV cases in that area beforehand and the youth of many but not all of those affected, the relative unavailability in the local area of treatment centers capable of dealing with long-term therapies, HIV/AIDS healthcare, and drug addiction during the initial phases of the outbreak, and political opposition to needle exchange programs, the outbreak expanded for months, resulting in up to 127 preventable cases. Under pressure, officials eventually declared a state of emergency, but much of the damage had already been done. In March 2025, the second Trump administration has cut much of the federal funding for HIV/AIDS research, prevention, and medication as part of the broader reorganization of the US Department of Health and Human Services announced by US President Donald Trump.

== See also ==
- Adult Industry Medical Health Care Foundation
- AIDS Education and Training Centers
- AIDS Project Los Angeles
- Criminal transmission of HIV in the United States
- Hank M. Tavera
- Healthcare and the LGBT community
- HIV/AIDS and African Americans
  - African-American LGBT community#HIV/AIDS
- Men who have sex with men (MSM)
  - Bugchasing, sexual subculture of HIV/AIDS fetishists
  - Down-low, sexual subculture of African-American MSM
  - HIV and men who have sex with men
  - Sexual practices between men
- President's Emergency Plan for AIDS Relief

International:

- AIDS education and training centers
- Elton John AIDS Foundation
- Joint United Nations Programme on HIV/AIDS
- HIV/AIDS activism
- HIV/AIDS activists
- HIV/AIDS global epidemic
- HIV/AIDS in North America
  - HIV/AIDS in Atlanta
  - HIV/AIDS in Canada
  - HIV/AIDS in New York City

== Bibliography ==
1. Cante, Richard C. (March 2008). Gay Men and the Forms of Contemporary US Culture. London: Ashgate Publishing. ISBN 978-0-7546-7230-2.
2. Bogart, Laura; Thorburn, Sheryl (February 2005). "Are HIV/AIDS conspiracy beliefs a barrier to HIV prevention among African Americans?". J. Acquir. Immune Defic. Syndr. 38 (2): 213–8. doi:10.1097/00126334-200502010-00014. PMID 15671808. S2CID 9659696.
3. Walker, Robert Searles (1994). AIDS: Today, Tomorrow : an Introduction to the HIV Epidemic in America (2nd ed.). Atlantic Highlands, New Jersey: Humanities Press Intl. ISBN 978-0-391-03859-2. OCLC 30399464.
4. Siplon, Patricia (2002). AIDS and the policy struggle in the United States. Washington D.C.: Georgetown University Press. ISBN 978-0-87840-378-3. OCLC 48964730.
5. National Research Council; Division of Behavioral and Social Sciences and Education; Commission on Behavioral and Social Sciences and Education; Panel on Monitoring the Social Impact of the AIDS Epidemic (February 1, 1993). The Social Impact of AIDS in the United States. National Academies Press. ISBN 978-0-309-04628-2.
