= HIV and men who have sex with men =

HIV among gay, bisexual, and other men who have sex with men (MSM)

Since reports of emergence and spread of the human immunodeficiency virus (HIV) in the United States between the 1970s and 1980s, the HIV/AIDS epidemic has frequently been linked to gay, bisexual, and other men who have sex with men (MSM) by epidemiologists and medical professionals. It was first noticed after doctors discovered clusters of Kaposi's sarcoma and pneumocystis pneumonia in homosexual men in Los Angeles, New York City, and San Francisco in 1981. The first official report on the virus was published by the Centers for Disease Control (CDC) on June 5, 1981, and detailed the cases of five young gay men who were hospitalized with serious infections. A month later, The New York Times reported that 41 homosexuals had been diagnosed with Kaposi's sarcoma, and eight had died less than 24 months after the diagnosis was made.

By 1982, the condition was referred to in the medical community as "gay-related immune deficiency" (GRID), "gay cancer", and "gay compromise syndrome". It was not until July 1982 that the term Acquired Immune Deficiency Syndrome (AIDS) was suggested to replace GRID, and it was not until September that the CDC first officially used the AIDS acronym. Scientists and physicians now know that HIV/AIDS does not only affect MSM and can infect anybody, regardless of sex and sexual orientation. Nonetheless, MSM are still considered a "key population" globally, meaning they have high rates of HIV and are at high risk for acquiring it.

Gay, bisexual, and other men who have sex with men are a small percentage of the U.S. population, but are consistently the population group most affected by the HIV/AIDS epidemic in the United States, and are the largest proportion of American citizens with an AIDS diagnosis who have died. The United Nations estimates the global median HIV prevalence among MSM at 7.7%.

== MSM as a behavioral category ==
Men who have sex with men (abbreviated as MSM, also known as males who have sex with males) are males who engage in sexual activities with members of the same sex, regardless of how they personally identify themselves. Many MSM choose not to (or cannot for other reasons) identify as homosexual or bisexual. Similarly, the label excludes men who identify as gay or bisexual, but who have never had sex with another man, including many gay teenagers.

The terms "men who have sex with men" (MSM) and "women who have sex with women" (WSW) have been used in medical scholarship and research since at least 1990. But, the term has been attributed to Glick et al., because their usage in a 1994 study solidified the concept in medical terminology. MSM is often used in medical literature and social research to describe such men as a group for research studies without considering issues of self-identification because it offers better behavioral categories for the study of disease-risk than identity-based categories (such as "gay", "bisexual", or "straight"), because a man who self-identifies as gay or bisexual is not necessarily sexually active with men, and someone who identifies as straight might be sexually active with men.

=== Demographics ===
Determining the number of men who have ever had sex with another man is difficult worldwide. The World Health Organization estimates that at least 3% and as high as 16% of men have had sex at least once with a man. Their estimate includes victims of sexual abuse in addition to men who regularly or voluntarily have sex with men. The United Nations estimates that 6-20% of men worldwide have sex with other men at some point during their lifetime. A recent study using social media platforms to estimate the global population of MSM resulted in much higher estimates than those reported by the UNAIDS.

==== MSM in the United States ====
The number of people living with HIV in the United States, and the number of deaths caused by AIDS by year (1980–2015).

Estimates about the U.S. population of men who have sex with men (MSM) vary. The Centers for Disease Control and Prevention estimate that men who have sex with men (MSM) represent about 2% of the American population. A 2005 study estimates that among U.S. men aged 15 to 44, an estimated 6% of have engaged in oral and/or anal sex with another man at some point in their lives, and about 2.9% have had at least one male partner in the previous 12 months. A 2007 study estimated that there are 7.1 million men who have sex with men (MSM) in the United States, or 6.4% of the overall U.S. population. The percentage of men who have sex with men varied by state, with the lowest percentage reported in South Dakota (3.3%) and the highest in the District of Columbia (13.2%). However, the same study found that 57% of men who have sex with men identified as heterosexual or bisexual. A 2010 study estimated that 2.6% of the male population in the United States had engaged in same-sex behavior in the past year, 4.0% in the past five years, and 7.0% at any point in their lifetime.

==== "Down-low" subculture among Black MSM ====
Down-low is an African-American slang term specifically used within the African-American community that typically refers to a sexual subculture of Black men who usually identify as heterosexual but actively seek sexual encounters and relations with other men, practice gay cruising, and frequently adopt a specific hip-hop attire during these activities. They generally avoid disclosing their same-sex sexual activities, and often have female sexual partner(s), and may be married or single.

In medical research, the term down-low is used to identify sexual identity-behaviour discordance among men who have sex with men (MSM). According to a study published in the Journal of Bisexuality, "[t]he Down Low is a lifestyle predominately practiced by young, urban Black men who have sex with other men and women, yet do not identify as gay or bisexual".

In this context, "being on the down-low" is more than just men having sex with men in secret, or a variant of closeted homosexuality or bisexuality—it is a sexual identity that is, at least partly, defined by its "cult of masculinity" and its rejection of what is perceived as White American culture (including what is perceived as White American LGBT culture) and terms. A 2003 cover story in The New York Times Magazine on the down-low phenomenon explains that the American Black community sees "homosexuality as a white man's perversion." It then goes on to describe the down-low subculture as follows:

Rejecting a gay culture they perceive as white and effeminate, many black men have settled on a new identity, with its own vocabulary and customs and its own name: Down Low. There have always been men – black and white – who have had secret sexual lives with men. But the creation of an organized, underground subculture largely made up of black men who otherwise live straight lives is a phenomenon of the last decade. ... Most date or marry women and engage sexually with men they meet only in anonymous settings like bathhouses and parks or through the Internet. Many of these men are young and from the inner city, where they live in a hypermasculine thug culture. Other DL men form romantic relationships with men and may even be peripheral participants in mainstream gay culture, all unknown to their colleagues and families. Most DL men identify themselves not as gay or bisexual but first and foremost as black. To them, as to many blacks, that equates to being inherently masculine.

The CDC cited three findings that relate to African-American men who operate on the down-low (engage in MSM activity but do not disclose to others):

- African American men who have sex with men (MSM), but who do not disclose their sexual orientation (nondisclosers), have a high prevalence of HIV infection (14%); nearly three times higher than nondisclosing MSMs of other races/ethnicities (5%).
- Confirming previous research, the study of 5,589 MSM, aged 15–29 years, in six U.S. cities found that African American MSM were more likely not to disclose their sexual orientation compared with white MSM (18% vs. 8%).
- HIV-infected nondisclosers were less likely to know their HIV status (98% were unaware of their infection compared with 75% of HIV-positive disclosers), and more likely to have had recent female sex partners.

== Risk factors ==
According to UNAIDS, in 2018, MSM globally have 22 times higher risk of acquiring HIV compared to all adult men.

A 2007 study analyzing two large population surveys found that "the majority of gay men had similar numbers of unprotected sexual partners annually as straight men and women." However, a 2006 study found that men who reported 4 or more male sexual partners were at increased risk of HIV infection. Study participants who reported amphetamine or heavy alcohol use before sex were more likely to have HIV or other sexually transmitted infections.

A Kaiser Family Foundation study indicated that fewer Americans view HIV as a top health priority today compared to ten years ago. In 1996, 25% of Americans viewed HIV as an "urgent problem" to their community but in 2009, only 17% listed it as "urgent." The percentage of 18- to 29-year-olds that were personally concerned about contracting the virus dropped from 28% in 1995 to 17% in 2009 A study conducted in 6 major U.S. cities found that only one in 4 teenage men who have sex with men believed they were personally at risk for contracting the HIV virus.

=== Unprotected anal intercourse ===
The HIV virus is more easily transmitted through unprotected anal intercourse than through unprotected vaginal intercourse and men who report unprotected receptive anal intercourse are at increased risk of contracting the HIV virus. Generally, the receptive partner is at greater risk of contracting the HIV virus because the lining of the rectum is thin and may allow the virus to enter the body through semen exchange. The insertive partner is also at risk because STIs can enter through the urethra or through small cuts, abrasions, or open sores on the penis. Also, condoms are more likely to break during anal sex than during vaginal sex. Thus, even with a condom, anal sex can be risky. A 2004 study of HIV positive men found men who had unprotected anal intercourse (UAI) in the past year were put at risk for contracting the virus. The study found that men who reported engaging in UAI had increased from 30% in 1996 to 42% in 2000. Almost half of all men who participated in UAI in 1996-1997 said that they had not known the HIV status of their partner Studies have found that risk factors for HIV infection are anal intercourse with a man in the past 12 months, having unstable housing, and having inhaled alkyl nitrites ("poppers"). A 2009 study on the prevalence of unprotected anal intercourse among HIV-diagnosed MSM found that a majority protected their partners during sexual activity, but a sizeable number of men continue to engage in sexual behaviors that place themselves and others at risk for HIV infections.

=== Condom fatigue ===
Although HIV transmission rates fell throughout the 1990s, they hit a plateau at the end of the decade. The increasing rates of sexually transmitted diseases in major cities in the United States, Canada, and the United Kingdom led to reports in the gay and mainstream media of condom fatigue and "AIDS optimism" as causes of the new "laxness" in safe sex practices. This is supported by research on the tendency of couples (heterosexual or homosexual) to use condoms less over time. A 2010 study found that gay and bisexual men choose to have unprotected sex for a variety of reasons and cannot be generalized. Erectile dysfunction, mental health problems and depression, lack of communication or intimacy, and a subculture of unprotected sex were all listed as reasons why men had sex without condoms voluntarily.

== Prevention ==
In the late 1980s the first direct advocacy groups for people with HIV/AIDS were created. Notably, the AIDS Coalition to Unleash Power (ACT UP) formed at the Lesbian, Gay, Bisexual & Transgender Community Center in New York in the wake of the antiretroviral drug AZT to petition better access to drugs as well as cheaper prices, public education about AIDS and the prohibition of AIDS-related discrimination.

The Joint United Nations Program on HIV/AIDS (UNAIDS) published a paper in 2005 offering specific policy solutions for alleviating the spread of the HIV virus in the MSM population for specific regions around the world. They pointed to "a profound lack of knowledge" and stigma about sexual identity as worldwide barriers to preventing transmission and encouraging those infected to seek treatment. The UNAIDS program has recommended that the South African government implement "sex positive" policies to reduce societal stigma around homosexuality and promote the use of water-based lubricants. Particularly in Morocco, the program has advocated distributing condoms in prisons. In recent years, the Chinese government has begun to acknowledge the sexuality of its constituents. According to UNAIDS, the "Government has made significant progress in recognizing the issue of male-to-male sexual health and HIV." In Latin America, outreach to rural areas is critical to ensuring care to all individuals. The United Nations also emphasizes a focus on LGBT populations that are most vulnerable in Latin American nations. In Jamaica, as in many countries across the globe, homosexuality is outlawed so there are unique challenges to HIV prevention in the MSM community. The UN is trying to implement community-based strategies in Jamaica while still ensuring the anonymity of the people served. In Norway, UNAIDS has observed an increasing number of MSM who have untreated sexually transmitted infections, and their emphasis is on promoting condom use within the gay community. Despite Canada's "liberal and progressive" reputation on the world stage, HIV-related stigma is still related to the gay community. The United Nations believes the United States needs to recognize sexual education as a fundamental human right. Additionally, better research on MSM in the U.S. would positively affect funding for HIV prevention and treatment programs.

Studies have shown that although there is a large market for vaginal microbicides in developing nations, rectal microbicides are stigmatized and less researched. No microbicide has yet been proven to effectively protect against the risks of unprotected anal intercourses, but advocates believe greater funding for research is needed since condom usage rates are so low. However, stigma and homophobia would potentially be barriers to individuals buying the product. The authors mention this is especially a concern in Caribbean countries where HIV prevalence is high but homosexuality is still illegal and highly stigmatized (See HIV/AIDS in the Caribbean.)

PrEP (oral pre-exposure prophylaxis) is a method of HIV prevention in which individuals at high risk for HIV, such as MSM, consume oral antiretrovirals to prevent infection. Often, these medications are taken orally as a combination of tenofovir and emtricitabine and are particularly effective in MSM. However, the effectiveness of PrEP is dependent on adherence. According to some studies, a 10% decrease in adherence reduced efficacy by 13%. PrEP is a significantly useful method of HIV prevention in addition to HIV testing, patient counseling, and safe sex practices.

=== Access to testing ===
UNAIDS has observed "sero-selection" (choosing a partner based on their HIV status) becoming increasingly prevalent in partner choice and transmission in the United States. A 2008 CDC study found that one in five (19%) of MSM in major U.S. cities were infected with HIV and almost half (44%) were unaware of their infection. Many HIV-infected individuals do not seek treatment until late in their infection (an estimated 42% do not seek treatment until they begin to experience signs of illness.) Furthermore, a significant portion of individuals who are tested for HIV never return for their test results. Studies have advocated for funding and implementation of HIV tests that can be administered outside medical settings since 2003. Home testing is considered especially important because 8%-39% of partners tested in studies of partner counseling and referral services (PCRS) were found to have a previously undiagnosed HIV infection that their partner was unaware of.

In October 2012, OraQuick, the first rapid HIV home-testing kit, went on sale for $40. The test is nearly 100% accurate when it predicts HIV-negative results for HIV-negative individuals. However, for HIV-positive individuals that are not yet producing the antibodies detected by the test, it produces a false negative 93% of the time. Although the manufacturer, OraSure Technologies, is not advertising the test for use for selection of partners, experts have suggested that it may prevent unprotected sexual contact with partners that lie about or are unaware of their HIV status.

A recent study examined how the OraQuick test would identify the behavior of 27 self-identified gay men who frequently had unprotected sex with acquaintances. The researchers gave each participant 16 tests to use over the course of three months. 101 potential partners were tested, and 10 were positive. None of the participants had sex with someone who tested positive. 23 other potential partners refused testing and left the encounter. 2 men admitted they were HIV-positive. Most participants said they would continue using home tests after the study ended to test potential partners on their own. The researchers considered home testing to be an effective prevention method for high-risk groups. However, the test's $40 cost is considered a major deterrent to commonplace partner testing.

== List of estimated HIV infection rates by country ==
Disclaimer: estimated HIV rates can be inaccurate. For example, UNAIDS reported that the HIV rate among MSM in Australia was 18.1%, but the actual rate reported by The Australian Federation of AIDS was 7.9%. This is due to the fact UNAIDS relied on a convenience sample of men who were more at risk to HIV, and thus did not capture an accurate representation of the MSM population.

Country	MSM HIV prevalence rate estimate (%)
Afghanistan	0.5
Albania	2.0
Algeria	2.4
Argentina	15.7
Armenia	5.0
Australia	8.1
Azerbaijan	2.6
Bahamas	19.6
Bangladesh	1.7
Barbados	2.8
Belarus	5.8
Belgium	12.3
Belize	13.9
Benin	7.0
Bolivia	25.8
Bosnia and Herzegovina	1.1
Botswana	14.8
Brazil	18.3
Burkina Faso	1.9
Burundi	4.8
Cabo Verde	15.0
Cambodia	4.0
Cameroon	20.6
Canada	6.7
Central African Republic	3.4
China	5.4
Colombia	17.0
Congo	41.2
Costa Rica	15.4
Côte d'Ivoire	7.7
Croatia	2.8
Cuba	5.6
Czech Republic	4.8
Democratic Republic of the Congo	7.1
Dominican Republic	4.0
Ecuador	10.2
Egypt	6.7
El Salvador	14.4
Eswatini	27.2
Fiji	0.5
Finland	0.4
France	14.0
Gambia	34.4
Germany	15
Ghana	4.9
Greece	12.7
Guatemala	9.0
Guyana	4.9
Haiti	4.5
Honduras	10
Hungary	4.1
India	3.3
Indonesia	17.9
Ireland	9.0
Italy	30.0
Jamaica	29.8
Japan	4.8
Jordan	0.2
Kazakhstan	6.9
Kenya	18.2
Kyrgyzstan	6.6
Lao People's Democratic Republic	4.1
Latvia	7.8
Lebanon	12
Lesotho	32.9
Liberia	19.8
Libya	3.1
Lithuania	3.0
Madagascar	14.9
Malawi	12.9
Malaysia	21.6
Mali	12.6
Mauritania	23.4
Mauritius	17.2
Mexico	11.9
Mongolia	7.7
Montenegro	12.5
Morocco	4.9
Myanmar	8.8
Nepal	5.0
Netherlands	0.3
New Zealand	6.5
Nicaragua	8.8
Niger	6.4
Nigeria	25
Pakistan	3.7
Panama	8.3
Paraguay	21.9
Peru	10.0
Philippines	5.0
Poland	7.2
Portugal	5.9
Republic of Moldova	11.4
Republic of North Macedonia	5.4
Romania	18.2
Saint Kitts and Nevis	1.3
Senegal	27.6
Serbia	6.0
Seychelles	13.2
Sierra Leone	3.4
Singapore	2.2
Slovenia	1.0
South Africa	29.7
South Korea	3.0
Spain	16
Sri Lanka	0.2
Sudan	0.8
Sweden	2.0
Switzerland	8.0
Tajikistan	2.3
Thailand	11.9
Timor-Leste	1.3
Togo	22.0
Trinidad and Tobago	26.6
Tunisia	8.2
Uganda	12.7
Ukraine	3.9
United Kingdom	8
United Republic of Tanzania	8.4
United States	14.5
Uruguay	8.5
Uzbekistan	3.7
Vietnam	13.3
Yemen	5.9
Zimbabwe	21.1

== HIV infection rates in the U.S. ==
The HIV virus affects the human immune system and, if left untreated can eventually lead to Acquired Immune Deficiency Syndrome (AIDS).

The CDC reported that in 2009 that male-to-male sex (MSM) accounted for 61% of all new HIV infections in the U.S. and that those who had a history of recreational drug injection accounted for an additional 3% of new infections. Among the approximately 784,701 people living with an HIV diagnosis, 396,810 (51%) were MSM. About 48% of MSM living with an HIV diagnosis were white, 30% were black, and 19% were Hispanic or Latino. Although the majority of MSM are white, non-whites accounted for 54% of new infections HIV related MSM infections in 2008.

In 2010 the CDC reported that MSM represented approximately 4 percent of the male population in the United States but male-to-male sex accounted for 78 percent of new HIV infections among men and 63 percent of all new infections. Men overall accounted for 76% of all adults and adolescents living with HIV infection at the end of 2010 in the United States, and 80% (38,000) of the estimated 47,500 new HIV infections. 69% of men living with HIV were gay, bisexual, and other men who have sex with men. 39% (14,700) of new HIV infections in US men were in blacks, 35% (13,200) were in whites, and 22% (8,500) were in Hispanics/Latinos. The rate of estimated new HIV infections among black men (per 100,000) was 103.6—six and a half times that of white men (15.8) and more than twice the rate among Hispanic/Latino men (45.5) as of 2010.

The CDC (2015) reported that gay and bisexual men accounted for 82% (26,375) of HIV diagnoses among males and 67% of all diagnoses in the United States, while six percent (2,392) of HIV diagnoses were attributed to injection drug use (IDU) and another 3% (1,202) to male-to-male sexual contact plus IDU. Heterosexual contact accounted for 24% (9,339) of all HIV diagnoses.

Among all gay and bisexual men with HIV infection classified as AIDS in the United States in 2015, African Americans accounted for the highest number (3,928; 39%), followed by whites (3,096; 31%) and Hispanics/Latinos (2,430; 24%). At the end of 2014, 508,676 gay and bisexual men were living with diagnosed HIV infection (53% of everyone living with diagnosed HIV in the US). Of gay and bisexual men living with diagnosed HIV, 157,758 (31%) were African American, 212,558 (42%) were white, and 109,857 (22%) were Hispanic/Latino. From 2005 to 2014 diagnoses among African American gay and bisexual men increased 22% but has increased less than 1% between 2010 and 2014. HIV diagnoses among African American gay and bisexual men aged 13 to 24 increased 87% between 2005 and 2014, but with diagnoses declining 2% between 2010 and 2014.

A 2010 study estimated that for every 100,000 MSM, 692 will be diagnosed with HIV. This makes MSM 60 times more likely to contract the virus than other men and 54 times more likely than women.

Since its height in 1993-1994 the death rate due to HIV has fallen more than 9 other leading causes of death, yet as of 2013 HIV continues to be one of the 10 leading causes of death among persons 25–44, especially among men, African Americans and in the South. Also as regards HIV relation to mortality, a study in the United Kingdom reported that in 2008 the overall mortality rate among the HIV-diagnosed population aged 15–59 years remained more than five times higher than that in the general population. However, as the study acknowledges data on the impact of HIV/AIDS on mortality among gay and bisexual men as well as among other populations, is very limited, and methods to use this are problematic.

== See also ==
- Gay Men's Health Crisis
- Gay male blood donor controversy
- Down-low (sexual slang)
- AIDS Project Los Angeles
