= Dan William =

American physician

Daniel C. William (January 22, 1946 – March 1, 2008) was one of the first openly gay physicians in the United States. Prior to the AIDS epidemic he helped the gay community to deal with common illnesses, especially sexually transmitted non-lethal ones.

William was one of the early AIDS physicians in New York City. During this early stage of the AIDS epidemic, there were no antiviral drugs available, and it had a 100% mortality rate. William was one of the first physicians to recognize a pattern of unexpected diseases among sexually active gay males.

He treated hundreds of early AIDS victims, initially without any success.
