= HIV Clinical Resource =

Health information service

HIV Clinical Resource is a health information service in New York State, which provides clinical information and guidance on HIV for the use of healthcare providers and patients.

== History and purpose ==
HIV Clinical Resource was established in 1999 as a collaborative effort between the New York State Department of Health AIDS Institute (NYSDOH AI) and the Johns Hopkins University Division of Infectious Diseases.

In recognition of the complex, multiple needs of New York State's HIV-infected population, including HIV transmission risk factors, demographic-specific issues, as well as New York State HIV-related policies and programs, the NYSDOH AI established clinical guidelines to assist New York State healthcare providers in treating their HIV-infected patients and referring them to other HIV-related services. The NYSDOH AI also recognized the need to provide standards of care for its residents because of the large number of people living with HIV/AIDS in the state. In 2006, New York State reported the highest number of new cases of AIDS (5,495), as well as the highest number of residents living with AIDS (177,262).

The program provides HIV-related clinical information, including:

- Clinical guidelines for the medical management of children, adolescents, and adults with HIV infection
- Best practices related to HIV clinical care
- Educational tools including teaching slide sets on HIV-related topics
- Quality improvement materials
- HIV-specific quality improvement software
- Clinical performance data

== Clinical guidelines ==
The general purpose of clinical practice guidelines is to assist in clinical decisions by providing recommendations that are based on a review of available clinical evidence, such as the results of clinical trials. However, clinical trials often take years to complete. With advances in medicine outpacing available data from clinical trials, treatment recommendations are often established through review of case reports, epidemiologic investigations, and committee consensus. These procedures shift the burden of evidence review from individual providers to the expert opinion of committees with the aim of improving quality of care.

As part of HIV Clinical Resource, the NYSDOH AI HIV Clinical Guidelines program addresses the medical management of adults, adolescents, and children with HIV infection; and primary and secondary prevention in medical settings. It also includes informational brochures for care providers and the public. The NYSDOH AI has established committees of clinicians and other care providers who serve people with HIV infection to address relevant topics and to regularly assess and update current recommendations, as well as develop new guidelines in accordance with emerging clinical and research developments. These committees include:

- Adults
- Pediatrics
- Women's Health
- Prevention
- Mental Health
- Substance Use
- Oral Health
- Pharmacy
- Perinatal Transmission

== Consumer input ==
In addition to evidence-based medicine, research has demonstrated that "patient-centered medicine" is an emerging aspect to clinical practice. Patients' experience and preferences are becoming prominent considerations in the provision of treatment. The HIV Clinical Guidelines program seeks input from the consumer advisory committee as part of an effort to include patients' experience in the guidelines development process. Each guideline is reviewed by consumers.
