= Yolanda Serrano =

American drug counselor and activist

- Born: Birth date unknown Puerto Rico
- Died: October 21, 1993; Brooklyn, New York
- Education: St. Francis College
- Employer: ADAPT
- Known for: HIV/AIDS activism, IV drug abusers activism
- Title: Executive Director
- Term: 1988–1993
- Children: 2
- Awards: Woman of the Year 1988
- Honors: one of Ms. magazine's Women of the Year 1988

Yolanda Serrano (died 1993) was an American drug counselor and HIV/AIDS activist. She received the National Organization for Women's Woman of the Year Award and was featured in Ms. magazine as one of the 1988 Women of the Year in 1988.

== Early life and education ==
Serrano was born in Puerto Rico to Dhelia and Gaspar Serrano. She had four siblings: Nora, Maria, Debbie, and Michael. She lived in Missouri and New Mexico before moving to Brooklyn in 1961. She divorced her husband in 1975 and raised her two children by herself while paying for and completing university.

Serrano graduated from St. Francis College in Brooklyn, New York.

== Career ==
Serrano worked for the Narcotics Bureau of the Brooklyn District Attorney, the Victim's Services Agency, and the State Division of Criminal Justice Services. She was Vice-President of the Hispanic AIDS Forum, secretary of the Latino Commission on AIDS, and a member of the Health and Human Services HIV Planning Council of New York. The government of Australia hired her as a consultant for their AIDS prevention programs. Over her career, she presented many papers in national and international HIV and AIDS conferences.

She was a drug counselor working at Long Island College Hospital in 1981 when she began suspecting that her patients were dying from AIDS and AIDS-related conditions. She realized that little was being done by medical and governmental organizations to protect her clients or to prevent them from acquiring HIV, although they were catching and spreading the virus in mass, because they were seen as "undesirables" to the public. She was quoted, "They weren't organized the way gays were, nobody wanted to deal with them."

=== ADAPT ===
Serrano began to focus her career on activism for IV drug users, and in 1983 she started working for Association for Drug Abuse Prevention and Treatment (ADAPT), an organization started by recovering drug addicts in 1979. The organization relied on a small full-time staff and large number of volunteers for their initiatives.

She worked to expand outreach and educational programs for HIV/AIDS infected drug users, prostitutes, and Parolee Aftercare Relapse Prevention support groups. She assembled bleach kits to decontaminate syringes and distribute them, along with condoms, to IV drug users. She started setting up information tables in Williamsburg and Bushwick in Brooklyn, New York, East Harlem in Manhattan, and Hunts Point/Mott Haven in South Bronx. Serrano said of her work:

I'm there to provide the addicts with information. It bothers me when they're sticking needles in their arms, but I feel protective. I live my work 24 hours. When I sleep, I dream about the people who died that day.

One drug user impacted by Serrano said of her, "She's like the Avon Lady. At first you think 'the lady is nuts,' she's going into buildings the police won't go near, taking her life into her own hands."

She coordinated the institution of the AIDS ward at Riker's Island Correctional Facility, where she and ADAPT began requesting the early release of prisoners who had AIDS, so that they could die peacefully in their own homes.

In 1988, Serrano became the Executive Director of ADAPT and defied laws banning the unauthorized use of needles and syringes by announcing that ADAPT would start a needle exchange in New York City. It was the first needle exchange in the United States. In 1985, the Department of Health (DOH) under City Health Commissioner Dr. David J. Sencer had tried to start an exchange, but the State didn't support the initiative. Serrano's announcement forced the issue and her pressure led to pilot needle-exchange program by the DOH. In 1990, after the election of Mayor David N. Dinkins, the city stopped the program but ADAPT carried on without support from lawmakers. Later in 1988, she brought in over $2.5 million for its programs. ADAPT also became involved in federally, state, and city-funded research projects; it was the first community-based program to be funded by the Centers for Disease Control and Prevention to conduct an epidemiological research study on HIV/AIDS infection among crack cocaine users.

== Death and legacy ==
She died of cancer on October 21, 1993 in St. Vincent's Hospital and Medical Center at the age of 45.

== See also ==
- HIV/AIDS in the United States
- HIV/AIDS in American prisons
