= HIV/AIDS denialism in South Africa =

Belief that HIV does not cause AIDS

In South Africa, HIV/AIDS denialism had a significant impact on public health policy from 1999 to 2008, during the presidency of Thabo Mbeki. Mbeki criticized the scientific consensus that HIV is the cause of AIDS beginning shortly after his election to the presidency. In 2000, he organized a Presidential Advisory Panel regarding HIV/AIDS including several scientists who denied that HIV caused AIDS.

In the following eight years of his presidency, Mbeki continued to express sympathy for HIV/AIDS denialism, and instituted policies denying antiretroviral drugs to AIDS patients. The Mbeki government even withdrew support from clinics that started using AZT to prevent mother-to-child transmission of HIV. He also restricted the use of a pharmaceutical company's donated supply of nevirapine, a drug that helps keep newborns from contracting HIV.

Instead of providing these drugs, which he described as "poisons", shortly after he was elected to the presidency, he appointed Manto Tshabalala-Msimang as the country's health minister, who promoted the use of unproven herbal remedies such as ubhejane, garlic, beetroot, and lemon juice to treat AIDS, which led to her acquiring the nickname "Dr. Beetroot." These policies have been blamed for the preventable deaths of between 343,000 and 365,000 people from AIDS.

Since 2008, Mbeki has been silent about his views and policies on AIDS; according to The New York Times, his spokesman, Mukoni Ratshitanga, said Mbeki would not discuss his thinking on HIV and AIDS, explaining that policy decisions were made collectively by the cabinet and so questions should be addressed to the government. Upon becoming president in 2008, Mbeki's successor, Kgalema Motlanthe, appointed Barbara Hogan as health minister to replace Tshabalala-Msimang on the first day of his presidency. Hogan told The New York Times, "The era of denialism is over completely in South Africa."

== Origin ==
The reason Mbeki became so enamored with HIV/AIDS denialism remains unclear, but some have suggested that it was influenced by Christine Maggiore meeting with him in the 1990s. Another factor may have been when, in 1999, Anthony Brink published an article entitled "A Medicine from Hell", which described AZT as dangerous and ineffective. Brink would later claim that this article was responsible for Mbeki's policies banning the use of the drug. Brink contacted Mbeki after the article was published, and was welcomed as an expert. Mbeki, in a 2002 document of which he was the co-author, also cited John le Carré's novel The Constant Gardener as influencing his fear of pharmaceutical companies and their influence on scientific research. Given that Mbeki explicitly accused supporters of the consensus position on HIV/AIDS of racism, it has also been proposed that his denialist views arose from a history of racist portrayals of black people in South Africa under the apartheid system.

An article in Race & Class by Joy Wang proposes that both of these factors influenced Mbeki's embrace of AIDS denialism, and cites Frantz Fanon's essay "Medicine and Colonialism" to explain what Wang describes as "...the impasse between scientists and Mbeki's government." Martin Asser has also proposed that Mbeki's views on AIDS may have been influenced by the high price of ARV therapy relative to the relatively small amount of money his country's citizens have at their disposal. In 2004, Theodore F. Sheckels of Randolph-Macon College argued that Mbeki, while discussing HIV/AIDS as president of South Africa, attempted to portray "the West" as the scapegoat in order to unite the country's black majority. Barton Gellman has proposed an alternative explanation for Mbeki's views—namely, that he is "a sort of restless, roving intellect who likes to surf the Internet and is accustomed to being a dissident who allies himself against establishments. After all, he spent his whole adult life fighting apartheid." He also noted that even if Mbeki followed every recommendation of the mainstream scientific community regarding AIDS he still wouldn't solve the problem, so, according to Gellman, Mbeki is "keeping the scientific uncertainties alive because he doesn't want to portray himself as helpless."

== Timeline ==
=== 1994 ===
On 10 May 1994, Nelson Mandela became President of South Africa, remaining in that office until replaced by Thabo Mbeki five years later. During his presidency, which lasted from then until 1999, Mandela remained largely indifferent to HIV/AIDS, and did not speak out about the danger it posed to South Africa until the early 2000s. Mandela had reportedly expressed regret that he did not do more to combat AIDS during his presidency.

=== 1997 ===
In early 1997, Mbeki, who was then the Deputy President of South Africa, approached the other members of the African National Congress to pitch the idea of using a new anti-AIDS drug, developed in South Africa, called Virodene. The advantages over existing ARV drugs which proved appealing to Mbeki included being 200 times less expensive than antiretroviral triple therapy, and the possibility of bypassing the Western medical establishment if it was proven to work. This led to a group of AIDS patients who had been treated with Virodene being invited to testify before the Cabinet of South Africa. Their testimonies included many statements that they had gained weight and seen boils on their faces vanish after they started being treated.

However, the fact remained that the makers of Virodene had previously been denied a license by the South African Medicines Control Council (MCC). The company argued that this happened because the South African AIDS establishment did not want any drugs other than ARVs to become available, because the establishment was funded by Western drug firms. Mbeki found this argument compelling. The drug was then legalized and heavily and favorably promoted in the popular media, until it became apparent that it posed a severe health hazard. The MCC subsequently declared the drug unfit for human consumption.

=== 1999 ===
==== June ====
On 14 June 1999, Mbeki was elected President of South Africa.

==== October ====
On 28 October, Mbeki gave a speech to the National Council of Provinces in which he touched upon the issue of HIV/AIDS, and especially whether his government should distribute ARV drugs. He argued that they shouldn't be so quick to do so because of their adverse effects, and recommended that the members of the council read the information on the Internet on the topic.

=== 2000 ===
==== March ====
On 19 March 2000, it was reported that Mbeki had consulted biochemist David Rasnick and history professor Charles Geshekter, both of whom are AIDS denialists, for advice on HIV/AIDS. Awa Marie Coll-Seck reacted to the news by saying, "At first, we were thinking we would just ignore it, but now we think this confusion can really undermine all the efforts people have made to prevent this disease."

==== April ====
On 20 April 2000, Mbeki sent a five-page letter to Bill Clinton in which he describes AIDS as a "uniquely African catastrophe", and compared the "persecution" of HIV/AIDS denialists to the treatment of black people in South Africa during the apartheid era. The letter was leaked to The Washington Post shortly afterward, which provoked condemnation from many commentators and "infuriated and embarrassed" Mbeki. The following day, Jacob Zuma, then South African deputy president, compared those criticizing HIV/AIDS denialists to critics of Galileo during the 17th century. "His views were considered to be so threatening to the scientific establishment that he was forced to publicly recant", Zuma was quoted as saying in a statement released by the office of the presidency.

==== May ====
Later that year, Mbeki convened a panel of 33 scientists whom he referred to as "experts", of whom about half were AIDS denialists such as Peter Duesberg and Harvey Bialy. The panel, known as the "Presidential Advisory Panel on AIDS", also included AIDS researchers who supported the scientific consensus that HIV causes AIDS, and was split about evenly between the two groups. Their first meeting was held from 6 May to 7 May. Nicoli Nattrass has blamed Duesberg and his supporters on this panel, as well as Mbeki, for the popularity of AIDS denialism in South Africa.

==== July ====
The Presidential Advisory Panel on AIDS's second meeting took place on 3 and 4 July in Johannesburg. Both meetings were closed to the general public and to nearly all journalists, with the exception of Mark Schoofs of the Village Voice. Schoofs reported that David Rasnick, another AIDS denialist member of the panel, had called for HIV testing to be completely banned, and had argued he hadn't seen "any evidence" of an AIDS catastrophe. The meeting also culminated in research proposals by both supporters and denialists of the HIV/AIDS hypothesis. South African health official Khotso Mokhele praised both proposals, saying that once concluded, one side of the HIV/AIDS debate might "shut up once and for all." The AIDS denialists at the meeting recommended that the disease be treated not with antiretroviral drugs, but rather with vitamins and "alternative" and "complementary" therapies including "massage therapy, music therapy, yoga, spiritual care, homeopathy, Indian ayurvedic medicine, light therapy and many other methods." On 6 July, the scientific community responded with the Durban Declaration, signed by 5,000 scientists and published in Nature. The declaration stated, among other things, that "HIV causes AIDS. It is unfortunate that a few vocal people continue to deny the evidence. This position will cost countless lives." Nevertheless, when the International AIDS Conference in Durban was held just three days later, where Mbeki was scheduled to give the opening speech, he openly rejected the mainstream view that HIV is the cause of AIDS, and instead argued that it was caused by poverty, bad nourishment and general ill-health. The solution was not, Mbeki continued, expensive western medicine, but the alleviation of poverty in Africa. He also invited Maggiore, an outspoken AIDS denialist, to give a talk at the conference, and, in one of his own speeches, exhorted the other delegates at the conference to "...speak to one another honestly and frankly, with sufficient tolerance to respect everybody's point of view, with sufficient tolerance to allow all voices to be heard." His speech met with largely negative reception from the delegates attending the conference, hundreds of whom walked out.

==== September ====
In September 2000, Mbeki told the South African Parliament that "The programme of the government in this country is based on this thesis that HIV causes Aids and everything in the programme says that." However, he later stated that he still did not think HIV caused AIDS, and that it could, in his view, only be a contributing factor, not a sole cause.

==== October ====
In mid-October, the South African government announced that Mbeki would be "reducing his role" in the HIV/AIDS debate, with Mbeki himself acknowledging he may have caused "confusion" by publicly challenging the mainstream view of the cause of AIDS. Nevertheless, his approval rating had already dropped from 70 to 50 percent in the previous year. Many senior American politicians had expressed private doubts about his judgment, though other South African politicians were even more outspoken in their criticism. For example, many South African trade and banking officials expressed concern that Mbeki's statements were driving away potential investors. In a 2007 interview, Mbeki told his biographer, Mark Gevisser, that he only did this because he was pressured to by his cabinet and he regrets his decision to do so.

=== 2001 ===
==== August ====
In August 2001, Mbeki incorrectly claimed, based on outdated statistics, that HIV/AIDS is only the 12th leading killer in South Africa, when it was actually the leading killer. He also asked health officials to reassess the budget accordingly, and proposed that the new healthcare budget include a decreased emphasis on HIV/AIDS.

==== October ====
The following October, Mbeki gave two speeches in which he demonstrated that, according to The New York Times, he "...remains badly misinformed about [HIV]..." In the speeches, he exaggerated the dangers of antiretroviral drugs (ARVs), downplayed the dangers of AIDS itself, and suggested that his critics were racist. The Economist reacted to his speech to Parliament, in which he claimed that ARVs "...are becoming as dangerous to health as the thing they are supposed to treat", by saying that this claim was simply wrong, adding that ARVs not only prolong life but also make sufferers less infectious. They also criticized the government's dismissal of its critics as stooges for international drug companies by arguing that "government intransigence, not the cost of drugs, is the real problem."

=== 2003 ===
On 26 September 2003, Mbeki's spokesman confirmed that Mbeki had in fact stated that he didn't know anyone with AIDS. This remark provoked considerable criticism from AIDS activists and opposition politicians, with Xolani Kunene of Treatment Action Campaign remarking that Mbeki was "not living in the real South Africa."

=== 2004 ===
Mbeki was asked by the South African Parliament if he thought rape played any role in spreading AIDS, to which he replied that "The disease of racism" led to blacks being portrayed as "lazy, liars, foul-smelling, diseased, corrupt, violent, amoral, sexually depraved, animalistic, savage and rapist." In an opinion piece written four years later, Roger Cohen cited this remark as evidence that Mbeki considered HIV/AIDS to be "a fabrication foisted on Africans by whites determined to distract the continent from real problems of racism and poverty, and accepted by blacks afflicted with the slave mentality engendered by apartheid."

==== April ====
The ARVs that had been approved by the government of South Africa five months earlier first began reaching hospitals in April 2004. Some AIDS activists considered this timing suspicious, as it was two weeks before the national elections were to take place that year.

=== 2005 ===
Matthias Rath traveled to South Africa to sell his vitamins which he claimed were effective at curing AIDS. He soon began organizing clinical trials of the efficacy of these vitamins, which led to the Treatment Action Campaign suing him later that year. Nevertheless, Tshabalala-Msimang stood by Rath, and even appeared at a forum in April to defend Rath's "right to free speech" and claim that his drugs had "equal validity" to ARVs. Only after a long-running legal battle with the Medicines Control Council were these trials finally declared illegal. AIDS activists have linked Rath's distribution of these vitamins to the deaths of some HIV/AIDS patients.

=== 2006 ===
==== October ====
On 26 October 2006, South Africa's government announced that they were reversing their previous policies on treatment of HIV/AIDS patients, and would now be distributing ARV drugs through the country's public health services. The announcement was made at a conference of AIDS activists, whom the government had previously ignored. These activists had been spending the previous few years in a legal battle with the country's government in an effort to get them to distribute ARV drugs.

==== December ====
In late 2006, Tshabalala-Msimang fell ill, after which the country's deputy health minister, Nozizwe Madlala-Routledge, assumed leadership over South Africa's health policies after being summoned to do so by deputy president Phumzile Mlambo-Ngcuka. While she was at the helm of South Africa's health policies from then until she was fired next August, she attempted to reverse Mbeki's AIDS denialist policies by describing the number of South Africans waiting for ARV drugs as a "serious violation of human rights." She was also one of the principal authors of the country's aggressively anti-AIDS health plan, which was adopted that December.

=== 2007 ===
On 9 August 2007, despite ongoing calls to fire Tshabalala-Msimang, Mbeki instead fired Madlala-Routledge, South Africa's then-deputy health minister and a longtime critic of his AIDS policies. The stated reason was that she had attended an AIDS conference without his permission, but critics argued this was merely an excuse for Mbeki to rid himself of a politician who was willing to criticize his policies. Given that few other South African officials were willing to criticize Mbeki's views on AIDS, The Economist expressed concern that her absence would lead to a reversal of the superior AIDS policies she had helped implement.

On 31 August 2007, after Tshabalala-Msimang came under attack for denying that HIV caused AIDS and promoting unorthodox treatments for the disease, Mbeki leapt to her defense, writing in ANC Today that she would go down in history as "...one of the pioneer architects of a South African public health system constructed to ensure that we achieve the objective of health for all our people, and especially the poor." He also referred to her as a hero and to her critics as "wild animals."

=== 2008 ===
On 7 February 2008, research by Nicoli Nattrass estimated that the failure of Mbeki's administration to provide ARV drugs until 2006 was responsible for about 343,000 deaths. Later that year, a study by Pride Chigwedere et al., published in the December 2008 issue of the Journal of Acquired Immune Deficiency Syndromes, estimated that Mbeki's HIV/AIDS policies were responsible for "more than 330,000" deaths.

On 25 September 2008, Kgalema Motlanthe succeeded Mbeki as president of South Africa. On the first day of his presidency, he removed Tshabalala-Msimang from the office of health minister and replaced her with Barbara Hogan. Hogan's views on AIDS reflected a dramatic shift from her predecessor's: in December 2008, she promised to increase the supply of ARV drugs available to pregnant women in South Africa, as well as to improve HIV prevention programs.

=== 2009 ===
==== July ====
On 19 July 2009, a paper co-authored by Duesberg and several other denialists was published, as an Epub ahead of print, in the non-peer-reviewed journal Medical Hypotheses (though it had originally been submitted to the Journal of Acquired Immune Deficiency Syndromes). The paper, which was mainly a response to Chigwedere's 2008 study, argued that official statistics showed that Chigwedere et al.'s estimates of deaths due to AIDS in South Africa (about 330,000 per year) were wildly overestimated and that there was "as yet no proof that HIV causes AIDS." Eventually, the journal received numerous expressions of concern about the paper, including accusations of libel and concern about its potential adverse impact on public health, and therefore retracted it that September. This led to Elsevier, the journal's publisher, threatening to fire Bruce Charlton, the journal's editor, if he did not institute a peer-review process for the journal. Charlton refused, and was therefore fired in May 2010.

==== October ====
On 29 October 2009, South Africa's president, Jacob Zuma, who had been elected president the previous May, gave a speech which was seen by many as the end of AIDS denialism in South Africa. In the speech, Zuma acknowledged HIV/AIDS as one of South Africa's most serious problems, saying that "...all South Africans need to know their HIV status, and be informed of the treatment options available to them."

== Criticism ==
During Mbeki's presidency, many medical researchers harshly criticized his AIDS policies and predicted that these policies would lead to countless deaths. Another critic of these policies was Harvard University's Robert Rotberg, who, in 2000, said of Mbeki's AIDS policies, "This is very foolish and uncharacteristic of him." In 2002, Mbeki's AIDS policies faced even more criticism, this time from Nelson Mandela, who said in an interview that "This [AIDS] is a war. It has killed more people than has been the case in all previous wars and in all previous natural disasters. We must not continue to be debating, to be arguing, when people are dying." The Anglican Archbishop of Cape Town, Njongonkulu Ndungane, also criticized these policies, saying that the government was "sinning" by "withholding truth and maintaining the silence of denial" over AIDS. Desmond Tutu also spoke out against Mbeki's AIDS denialist policies and compared them to "fiddling while Rome burns". Ndungane, along with Max Essex, have argued that Mbeki's policies were worse than just bad judgment—Ndungane even described these policies as a crime against humanity on the same scale as apartheid. After Chigwedere et al.'s research estimating AIDS denialist policies in South Africa led to over 300,000 deaths was published, philosopher Peter Singer cited it in support of his conclusion that "Mbeki, like Mandela, was active in the struggle against apartheid. Yet the Harvard study shows that he is responsible for the deaths of 5,000 times as many black South Africans as the white South African police who fired on the crowd at Sharpeville." Singer also wrote that while Mbeki was not motivated by malice in deciding his AIDS policies, that he was nevertheless "culpable, not for having initially entertained a view held by a tiny minority of scientists, but for having clung to this view without allowing it to be tested in fair and open debate among experts." Other critics, such as Karl Kruszelnicki, have noted that South Africa, unlike many of its fellow sub-Saharan African countries, "...has both the medical personnel and wealth to meet the HIV/AIDS challenge head-on", making it especially unfortunate that these resources were not used for so long.

== Public popularity of AIDS denialism in South Africa ==
In 2006, 40% of South Africans believed there was a cure for AIDS. Research presented by Nicoli Nattrass at a Harvard symposium on 19 October 2009, concluded that "...denialist beliefs are held disproportionately by black African men and are far more likely to be held by those supportive of Mbeki's health minister [Tshabalala-Msimang]."
