= Misconceptions about HIV/AIDS =

Misinformation about the HIV/AIDS and its spread

The spread of HIV/AIDS has affected millions of people worldwide; AIDS is considered a pandemic. The World Health Organization (WHO) estimated that in 2016 there were 36.7 million people worldwide living with HIV/AIDS, with 1.8 million new HIV infections per year and 1 million deaths due to AIDS. Misconceptions about HIV and AIDS arise from several different sources, from simple ignorance and misunderstandings about scientific knowledge regarding HIV infections and the cause of AIDS to misinformation propagated by individuals and groups with ideological stances that deny a causative relationship between HIV infection and the development of AIDS. Below is a list and explanations of some common misconceptions and their rebuttals. Each entry on this list is worded as a correction; the misconceptions themselves are implied rather than stated.

== The relationship between HIV and AIDS ==
=== HIV is not the same as AIDS ===
HIV is an acronym for human immunodeficiency virus, which is the virus that causes AIDS (acquired immunodeficiency syndrome). Contracting HIV can lead to the development of AIDS or stage 3 HIV, which causes serious damage to the immune system. While this virus is the underlying cause of AIDS, not all HIV-positive individuals have AIDS, as HIV can remain in a latent state for many years. If undiagnosed or left untreated, HIV usually progresses to AIDS, defined as possessing a CD4+ lymphocyte count under 200 cells/μL or HIV infection plus co-infection with an AIDS-defining opportunistic infection. HIV cannot be cured, but it can be treated, and its transmission can be halted. Treating HIV can prevent new infections, which is the key to ultimately defeating AIDS.

== Treatment ==
=== HIV cannot be fully cured ===
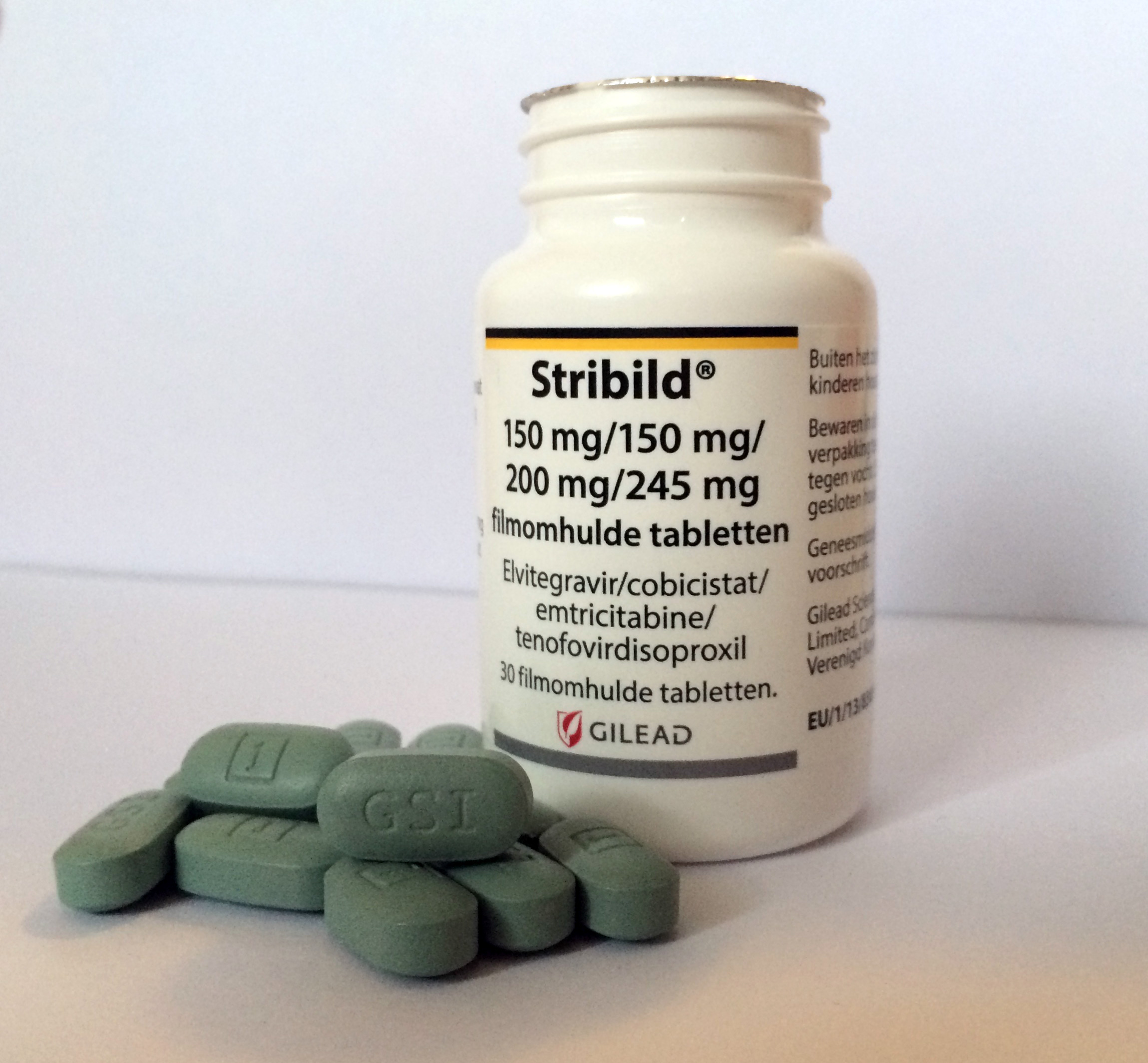
A bottle containing Stribild tablets (medication used to treat HIV). Stribild is a combination drug containing tenofovir disoproxil fumarate, emtricitabine, elvitegravir and cobicistat.

Highly active anti-retroviral therapy (HAART) in many cases allows the stabilization of the patient's symptoms, partial recovery of CD4+ T-cell levels, and reduction in viremia (the level of virus in the blood) to low or near-undetectable levels. Disease-specific drugs can also alleviate symptoms of AIDS and even cure specific AIDS-defining conditions in some cases. Medical treatment can reduce HIV infection in many cases to a survivable chronic condition. However, these advances do not constitute a cure, since current treatment regimens cannot eradicate latent HIV from the body.

High levels of HIV-1 (often HAART-resistant) develop if treatment is stopped, if compliance with treatment is inconsistent, or if the virus spontaneously develops resistance to an individual's regimen. Antiretroviral treatment known as post-exposure prophylaxis reduces the chance of acquiring an HIV infection when administered within 72 hours of exposure to HIV. However, an overwhelming body of clinical evidence has demonstrated the U=U rule - if someone's viral load is undetectable (<200 viral copies per mL) they are untransmissible. Essentially this means if a person living with HIV is well controlled on medications with a viral load less than 200, they cannot transmit HIV to their partners via sexual contact. The landmark study that first established this was the HPTN052 study, which looked at over 2000 couples over 10 years, where one partner was HIV positive, and the other partner was HIV negative.

=== Sexual intercourse with a virgin will not cure AIDS ===
The myth that sex with a virgin will cure AIDS is prevalent in South Africa. Sex with an uninfected virgin does not cure an HIV-infected person, and such contact will expose the uninfected individual to HIV, potentially further spreading the disease. This myth has gained considerable notoriety as the perceived reason for certain sexual abuse and child molestation occurrences, including the rape of infants, in South Africa.

=== Sexual intercourse with an animal will not avoid or cure AIDS ===
In 2002, the National Council of Societies for the Prevention of Cruelty to Animals (NSPCA) in Johannesburg, South Africa, recorded beliefs amongst youths that sex with animals is a means to avoid AIDS or cure it if infected. As with "virgin cure" beliefs, there is no scientific evidence suggesting a sexual act can actually cure AIDS, and no plausible mechanism by which it could do so has ever been proposed. While the risk of contracting HIV via sex with animals is likely much lower than with humans due to HIV's inability to infect animals, the practice of bestiality still has the ability to infect humans with other fatal zoonotic diseases.

=== HIV antibody testing is reliable ===
Diagnosis of infection using antibody testing is a well-established technique in medicine. HIV antibody tests exceed the performance of most other infectious disease tests in both sensitivity (the ability of the screening test to give a positive finding when the person tested truly has the disease) and specificity (the ability of the test to give a negative finding when the subjects tested are free of the disease under study). Many current HIV antibody tests have sensitivity and specificity in excess of 96% and are therefore extremely reliable. While most patients with HIV show an antibody response after six weeks, window periods vary and may occasionally be as long as three months.

Progress in testing methodology has enabled detection of viral genetic material, antigens, and the virus itself in bodily fluids and cells. While not widely used for routine testing due to high cost and requirements in laboratory equipment, these direct testing techniques have confirmed the validity of the antibody tests.

Positive HIV antibody tests are usually followed up by retests and tests for antigens, viral genetic material and the virus itself, providing confirmation of actual infection.

== HIV infection ==
Symptoms of acute HIV infection

=== HIV cannot be spread through casual contact with an HIV infected individual ===
Symptoms of AIDS

One cannot become infected with HIV through normal contact in social settings, schools, or in the workplace. Other examples of casual contact in which HIV infection will not occur include shaking someone's hand, hugging or "dry" kissing someone, using the same toilet or drinking from the same glass as an HIV-infected person, and being exposed to coughing or sneezing by an infected person. Saliva carries a negligible viral load, so even open-mouthed kissing is considered a low risk. However, if the infected partner or both of the performers have blood in their mouth due to cuts, open sores, or gum disease, the risk increases. The Centers for Disease Control and Prevention (CDC) has only recorded one case of possible HIV transmission through kissing (involving an HIV-infected man with significant gum disease and a sexual partner also with significant gum disease), and the Terence Higgins Trust says that this is essentially a no-risk situation.

Other interactions that could theoretically result in person-to-person transmission include caring for nose bleeds and home health care procedures, yet there are very few recorded incidents of transmission occurring in these ways. A handful of cases of transmission via biting have occurred, though this is extremely rare.

=== HIV-positive individuals cannot be detected by their appearance ===
Due to media images of the effects of AIDS, many people believe that individuals infected with HIV always appear a certain way, or at least appear different from an uninfected, healthy person. In fact, disease progression can occur over a long period of time before the onset of symptoms, and as such, HIV infections cannot be detected based on appearance.

=== HIV can be transmitted through oral sex ===
Contracting HIV through oral sex is possible, but it is much less likely than from anal sex and penile–vaginal intercourse. No cases of such a transmission were observed in a sample of 8965 people performing receptive oral sex.

=== HIV is not transmitted by mosquitoes ===
When mosquitoes bite a person, they do not inject the blood of a previous victim into the person they bite next. Mosquitoes do, however, inject their saliva into their victims, which may carry diseases such as dengue fever, malaria, yellow fever, or West Nile virus and can infect a bitten person with these diseases. HIV is not transmitted in this manner. On the other hand, a mosquito may have HIV-infected blood in its gut, and if swatted on the skin of a human who then scratches it, transmission is hypothetically possible, though this risk is extremely small, and no cases have yet been identified through this route.

=== HIV can survive for extended periods outside the body ===
HIV can survive at room temperature outside the body for hours if dry (provided that initial concentrations are high), and for weeks if wet (in used syringes/needles). However, the amounts typically present in bodily fluids do not survive nearly as long outside the body—generally no more than a few minutes if dry.

=== HIV does not only infect homosexual men and drug users ===
HIV can transmit from one person to another if an engaging partner is HIV positive. In the United States, the main route of infection is via homosexual anal sex, while for women transmission is primarily through heterosexual contact. It is true that anal sex (regardless of the sex of the receptive partner) carries a higher risk of infection than most sex acts, but most penetrative sex acts between any individuals carry some risk. Properly used condoms can reduce this risk.

=== An HIV-infected person can have children ===
HIV-infected women remain fertile, although in late stages of HIV disease a pregnant woman may have a higher risk of miscarriage. Normally, the risk of transmitting HIV to the unborn child is between 15 and 30%. However, this may be reduced to just 2–3% if patients carefully follow medical guidelines.

=== The antibody response caused by the body does not always eliminate HIV infections ===
There are numerous examples of viruses other than HIV that can be pathogenic after evidence of immunity appears. Measles virus may persist for years in brain cells, eventually causing a chronic neurologic disease despite the presence of antibodies. Viruses such as Cytomegalovirus, Herpes simplex virus, and Varicella zoster may be activated after years of latency even in the presence of abundant antibodies. In other animals, viral relatives of HIV with long and variable latency periods, such as visna virus in sheep, cause central nervous system damage even after the production of antibodies.

HIV has a well-recognized capacity to mutate to evade the ongoing immune response of the host.

=== A large number of CD4+ T-cells are infected by HIV over the course of the infection ===
Although the fraction of CD4+ T-cells that is infected with HIV at any given time is never high (only a small subset of activated cells serve as ideal targets of infection), several groups have shown that rapid cycles of death of infected cells and infection of new target cells occur throughout the course of the disease. Macrophages and other cell types are also infected with HIV and serve as reservoirs for the virus.

Furthermore, like other viruses, HIV is able to suppress the immune system by secreting proteins that interfere with it. For example, HIV's coat protein, gp120, sheds from viral particles and binds to the CD4 receptors of otherwise healthy T-cells; this interferes with the normal function of these signalling receptors. Another HIV protein, Tat, has been demonstrated to suppress T cell activity.

Infected lymphocytes express the Fas ligand, a cell-surface protein that triggers the death of neighboring uninfected T-cells expressing the Fas receptor. This "bystander killing" effect shows that great harm can be caused to the immune system even with a limited number of infected cells.

== History of HIV/AIDS ==
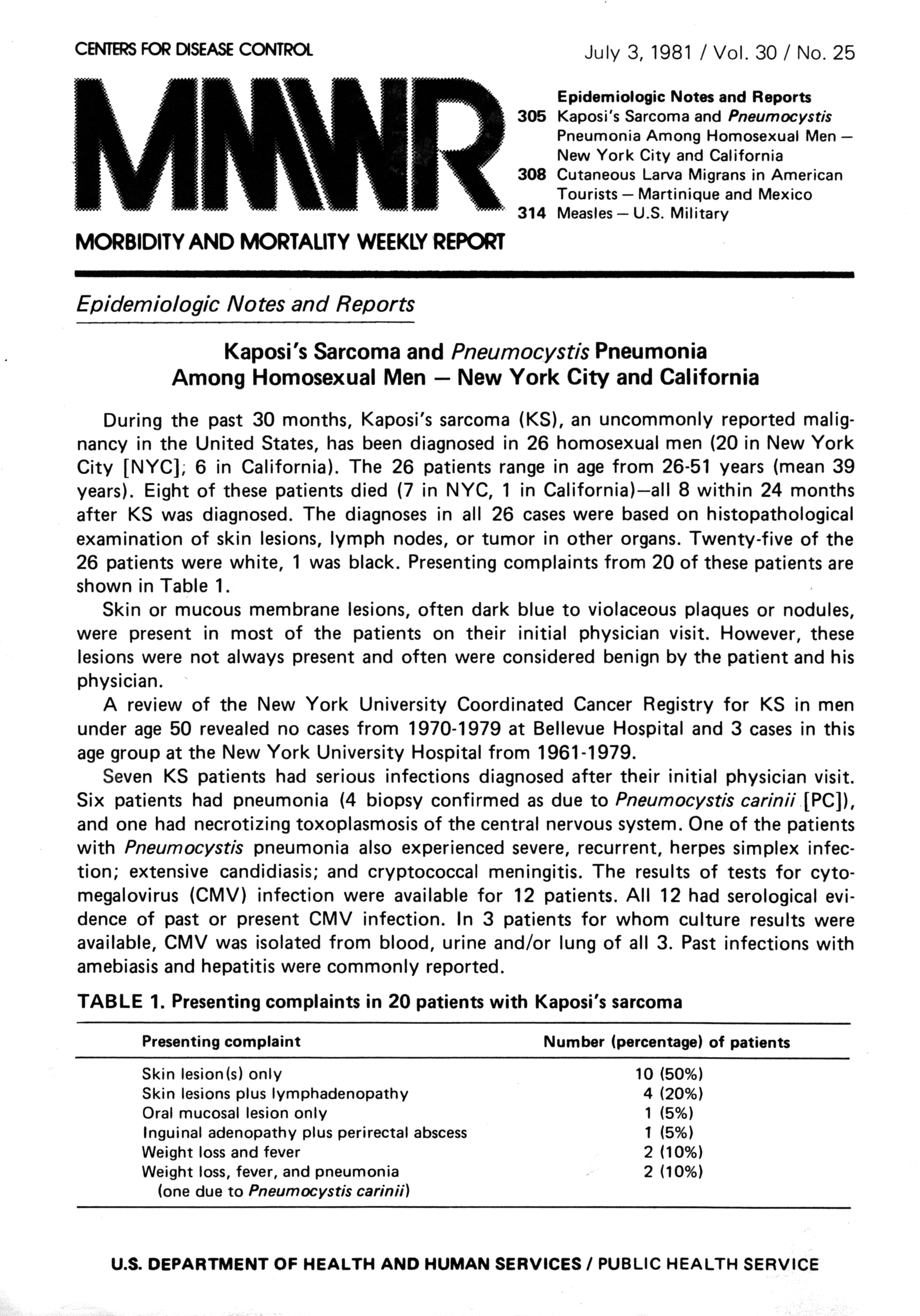
The cover page of MMWR on July 3, 1981. The first major public info regarding (what later became known as) AIDS/HIV.

The current consensus is that HIV was introduced to North America by a Haitian immigrant who contracted it while working in the Democratic Republic of the Congo in the early 1960s, or from another person who worked there during that time. In 1981 on June 5, the U.S. Centers for Disease Control and Prevention (CDC) published a Morbidity and Mortality Weekly Report (MMWR) describing cases of a rare lung infection, Pneumocystis carinii pneumonia (PCP), in five healthy gay men in Los Angeles. This edition would later become MMWR's first official reporting of the AIDS epidemic in North America. By year-end, a cumulative total of 337 cases of severe immune deficiency had been reported, and 130 out of the 337 reported cases had died. On September 24, 1982, the CDC used the term "AIDS" (acquired immune deficiency syndrome) for the first time, and released the first case definition of AIDS: "a disease at least moderately predictive of a defect in cell-mediated immunity, occurring in a person with no known case for diminished resistance to that disease." The March 4, 1983 edition of the Morbidity and Mortality Weekly Report (MMWR) noted that most cases of AIDS had been reported among homosexual men with multiple sexual partners, injection drug users, Haitians, and hemophiliacs. The report suggested that AIDS may be caused by an infectious agent that is transmitted sexually or through exposure to blood or blood products, and issued recommendations for preventing transmission. Although most cases of HIV/AIDS were discovered in gay men, on January 7, 1983, the CDC reported cases of AIDS in female sexual partners of males with AIDS. In 1984, scientists identified the virus that causes AIDS, which was first named after the T-cells affected by the strain and is now called HIV or human immunodeficiency virus.

=== Human–monkey sexual intercourse is most likely not the origin of HIV ===
While HIV is most likely a mutated form of simian immunodeficiency virus (SIV), a disease present only in chimpanzees and African monkeys, highly plausible explanations for the transfer of the disease between species (zoonosis) exist not involving sexual intercourse. In particular, the African chimpanzees and monkeys which carry SIV are often hunted for food, and epidemiologists theorize that the disease may have appeared in humans after hunters came into blood-contact with monkeys infected with SIV that they had killed. The first known instance of HIV in a human was found in a person who died in the Democratic Republic of the Congo in 1959, and a recent study dates the last common ancestor of HIV and SIV to between 1884 and 1914 by using a molecular clock approach.

Tennessee State Senator Stacey Campfield was the subject of controversy in 2012 after stating that AIDS was the result of a human having sexual intercourse with a monkey.

=== Gaëtan Dugas was not "patient zero" ===
The Canadian flight attendant Gaëtan Dugas has been referred to as "patient zero" of the HIV/AIDS epidemic, meaning the first case of HIV/AIDS in the United States. In fact, the "patient zero" moniker originated from a misinterpretation of a 1984 study that referred to Dugas as "patient O", where the O stood for "out of California". A 2016 study published in Nature found "neither biological nor historical evidence that [Dugas] was the primary case in the US or for subtype B as a whole."

== AIDS denialism ==
=== There is AIDS in Africa ===
The diseases that have come to be associated with AIDS in Africa, such as cachexia, diarrheal diseases and tuberculosis have long been severe burdens there. However, high rates of mortality from these diseases, formerly confined to the elderly and malnourished, are now common among HIV-infected young and middle-aged people, including well-educated members of the middle class.

For example, in a study in Côte d'Ivoire, HIV-seropositive individuals with pulmonary tuberculosis were 17 times more likely to die within six months than HIV-seronegative individuals with pulmonary tuberculosis. In Malawi, mortality over three years among children who had received recommended childhood immunizations and who survived the first year of life was 9.5 times higher among HIV-seropositive children than among HIV-seronegative children. The leading causes of death were wasting and respiratory conditions. Elsewhere in Africa, findings are similar.

=== HIV is the cause of AIDS ===
There is broad scientific consensus that HIV is the cause of AIDS, but some individuals reject this consensus, including biologist Peter Duesberg, biochemist David Rasnick, journalist/activist Celia Farber, conservative writer Tom Bethell, and intelligent design advocate Phillip E. Johnson. (Some one-time skeptics have since rejected AIDS denialism, including physiologist Robert Root-Bernstein, and physician and AIDS researcher Joseph Sonnabend.)

A great deal is known about the pathogenesis of HIV disease, even though important details remain to be elucidated. However, a complete understanding of the pathogenesis of a disease is not a prerequisite to knowing its cause. Most infectious agents have been associated with the disease they cause long before their pathogenic mechanisms have been discovered. Because research in pathogenesis is difficult when precise animal models are unavailable, the disease-causing mechanisms in many diseases, including tuberculosis and hepatitis B, are poorly understood, but the pathogens responsible are very well established.

==== AZT and other antiretroviral drugs do not cause AIDS ====
The vast majority of people with AIDS never received antiretroviral drugs, including those in developed countries prior to the licensure of AZT in 1987. Even today, very few individuals in developing countries have access to these medications.

In the 1980s, clinical trials enrolling patients with AIDS found that AZT given as single-drug therapy conferred a survival advantage compared to placebo, albeit modest and short-lived. Among HIV-infected patients who had not yet developed AIDS, placebo-controlled trials found that AZT given as a single-drug therapy delayed, for a year or two, the onset of AIDS-related illnesses. The lack of excess AIDS cases and death in the AZT arms of these placebo-controlled trials effectively counters the argument that AZT causes AIDS.

Subsequent clinical trials found that patients receiving two-drug combinations had up to 50% increases in time to progression to AIDS and in survival when compared to people receiving single-drug therapy. In more recent years, three-drug combination therapies have produced another 50–80% improvements in progression to AIDS and in survival when compared to two-drug regimens in clinical trials. Use of potent anti-HIV combination therapies has contributed to dramatic reductions in the incidence of AIDS and AIDS-related deaths in populations where these drugs are widely available, an effect which would be unlikely if antiretroviral drugs caused AIDS.

==== Behavioral factors such as recreational drug use and multiple sexual partners do not account for AIDS ====
The proposed behavioral causes of AIDS, such as multiple sexual partners and long-term recreational drug use, have existed for many years. The epidemic of AIDS, characterized by the occurrence of formerly rare opportunistic infections such as Pneumocystis carinii pneumonia (PCP), did not occur in the United States until a previously unknown human retrovirus—HIV—spread through certain communities.

Compelling evidence against the hypothesis that behavioral factors cause AIDS comes from recent studies that have followed cohorts of homosexual men for long periods of time and found that only HIV-seropositive men develop AIDS. For example, in a prospectively studied cohort in Vancouver, British Columbia, 715 homosexual men were followed for a median of 8.6 years. Among 365 HIV-positive individuals, 136 developed AIDS. No AIDS-defining illnesses occurred among 350 seronegative men, despite the fact that these men reported appreciable use of nitrite inhalants ("poppers") and other recreational drugs, and frequent receptive anal intercourse (Schechter et al., 1993).

Other studies show that among homosexual men and injection-drug users, the specific immune deficit that leads to AIDS—a progressive and sustained loss of CD4+ T-cells—is extremely rare in the absence of other immunosuppressive conditions. For example, in the Multicenter AIDS Cohort Study, more than 22,000 T-cell determinations in 2,713 HIV-seronegative homosexual men revealed only one individual with a CD4+ T-cell count persistently lower than 300 cells/μL of blood, and this individual was receiving immunosuppressive therapy.

In a survey of 229 HIV-seronegative injection-drug users in New York City, mean CD4+ T-cell counts of the group were consistently more than 1000 cells/μL of blood. Only two individuals had two CD4+ T-cell measurements of less than 300/μL of blood, one of whom died with cardiac disease and non-Hodgkin's lymphoma listed as the cause of death.

==== AIDS among transfusion recipients is due to HIV, not the underlying diseases that necessitated the transfusion ====
This is evidenced by a report by the Transfusion Safety Study Group (TSSG), which compared HIV-negative and HIV-positive blood recipients who had been given blood transfusions for similar diseases. Approximately 3 years following blood transfusion, the mean CD4+ T-cell count in 64 HIV-negative recipients was 850/μL of blood, while 111 HIV-seropositive individuals had average CD4+ T-cell counts of 375/μL of blood. By 1993, there were 37 cases of AIDS in the HIV-infected group, but not a single AIDS-defining illness in the HIV-seronegative transfusion recipients.

==== HIV, not high usage of clotting factor concentrate, leads to CD4+ T-cell depletion and AIDS in hemophiliacs ====
This view is supported by many studies. For example, among HIV-seronegative patients with hemophilia A enrolled in the Transfusion Safety Study, no significant differences in CD4+ T-cell counts were noted between 79 patients with no or minimal factor treatment and 52 with the largest amount of lifetime treatments. Patients in both groups had CD4+ T-cell-counts within the normal range. In another report from the Transfusion Safety Study, no instances of AIDS-defining illnesses were seen among 402 HIV-seronegative hemophiliacs who had received factortherapy.

In a cohort in the United Kingdom, researchers matched 17 HIV-seropositive hemophiliacs with 17 HIV-seronegative hemophiliacs with regard to clotting factor concentrate usage over a ten-year period. During this time, 16 AIDS-defining clinical events occurred in 9 patients, all of whom were HIV-seropositive. No AIDS-defining illnesses occurred among the HIV-negative patients. In each pair, the mean CD4+ T-cell count during follow-up was, on average, 500 cells/μL lower in the HIV-seropositive patient.

Among HIV-infected hemophiliacs, Transfusion Safety Study investigators found that neither the purity nor the amount of factor VIII therapy had a deleterious effect on CD4+ T-cell counts. Similarly, the Multicenter Hemophilia Cohort Study found no association between the cumulative dose of plasma concentrate and incidence of AIDS among HIV-infected hemophiliacs.

==== The gender distribution of AIDS cases is similar to the distribution of HIV infections ====
The distribution of AIDS cases, whether in the United States or elsewhere in the world, invariably mirrors the prevalence of HIV in a population. In the United States, HIV first appeared in populations of injection-drug users (a majority of whom are male) and gay men. HIV is spread primarily through unprotected sex, the exchange of HIV-contaminated needles, or cross-contamination of the drug solution and infected blood during intravenous drug use. Because these behaviors show a gender skew—Western men are more likely to take illegal drugs intravenously than Western women, and men are more likely to report higher levels of the riskiest sexual behaviors, such as unprotected anal intercourse—it is not surprising that a majority of U.S. AIDS cases have occurred in men.

Women in the United States, however, are increasingly becoming HIV-infected, usually through the exchange of HIV-contaminated needles or sex with an HIV-infected male. The CDC estimates that 30 percent of new HIV infections in the United States in 1998 were in women. As the number of HIV-infected women has risen, so too has the number of female AIDS patients in the United States. Approximately 23% of U.S. adult/adolescent AIDS cases reported to the CDC in 1998 were among women. In 1998, AIDS was the fifth leading cause of death among women aged 25 to 44 in the United States, and the third leading cause of death among African-American women in that age group.

In Africa, HIV was first recognized in sexually active heterosexuals, and AIDS cases in Africa have occurred at least as frequently in women as in men. Overall, the worldwide distribution of HIV infection and AIDS between men and women is approximately 1 to 1. In sub-Saharan Africa, 57% of adults with HIV are women, and young women aged 15 to 24 are more than three times as likely to be infected as young men.

==== The existence of individuals with HIV that have not developed AIDS is consistent with the idea that HIV causes AIDS ====
HIV infections have a prolonged and variable course. The median period of time between infection with HIV and the onset of clinically apparent disease is approximately 10 years in industrialized countries, according to prospective studies of homosexual men in which dates of seroconversion are known. Similar estimates of asymptomatic periods have been made for HIV-infected blood-transfusion recipients, injection-drug users and adult hemophiliacs.

As with many diseases, a number of factors can influence the course of HIV disease. Factors such as age or genetic differences between individuals, the level of virulence of the individual strain of virus, as well as exogenous influences such as co-infection with other microbes may determine the rate and severity of HIV disease expression. Similarly, some people infected with hepatitis B, for example, show no symptoms or only jaundice and clear their infection, while others suffer disease ranging from chronic liver inflammation to cirrhosis and hepatocellular carcinoma. Co-factors probably also determine why some smokers develop lung cancer while others do not.

==== The existence of people with symptoms associated with AIDS that are not infected with HIV is consistent with the idea that HIV causes AIDS ====
Most AIDS symptoms result from the development of opportunistic infections and cancers associated with severe immunosuppression secondary to HIV.

However, immunosuppression has many other potential causes. Individuals who take glucocorticoids or immunosuppressive drugs to prevent transplant rejection or to treat autoimmune diseases can have increased susceptibility to unusual infections, as do individuals with certain genetic conditions, severe malnutrition and certain kinds of cancers. There is no evidence suggesting that the numbers of such cases have risen, while abundant epidemiologic evidence shows a very large rise in cases of immunosuppression among individuals who share one characteristic: HIV infection.

==== The spectrum of AIDS-related infections seen in different populations is consistent with the idea that AIDS is a single disease caused by HIV ====
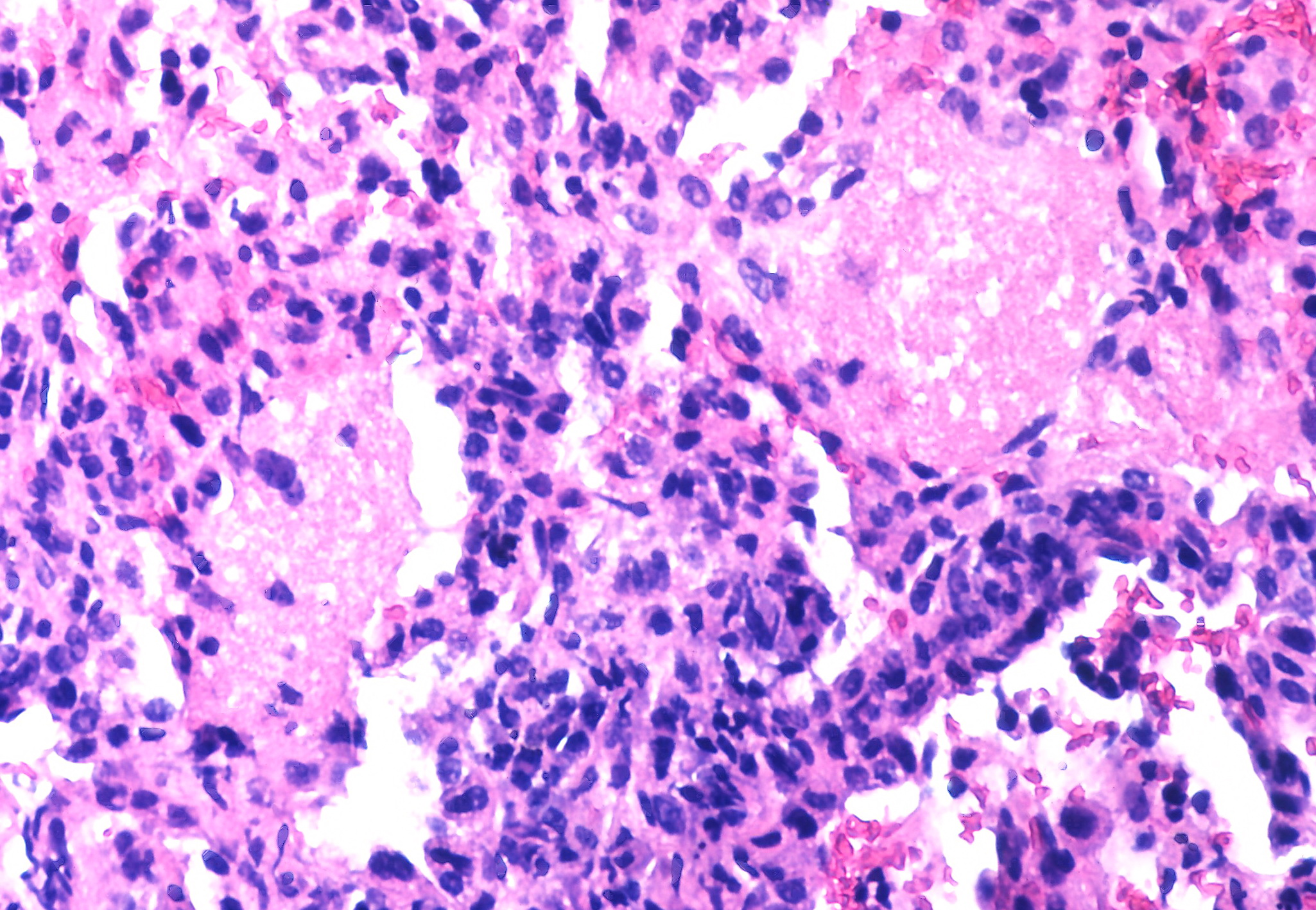
Pneumocystis jiroveci pneumonia

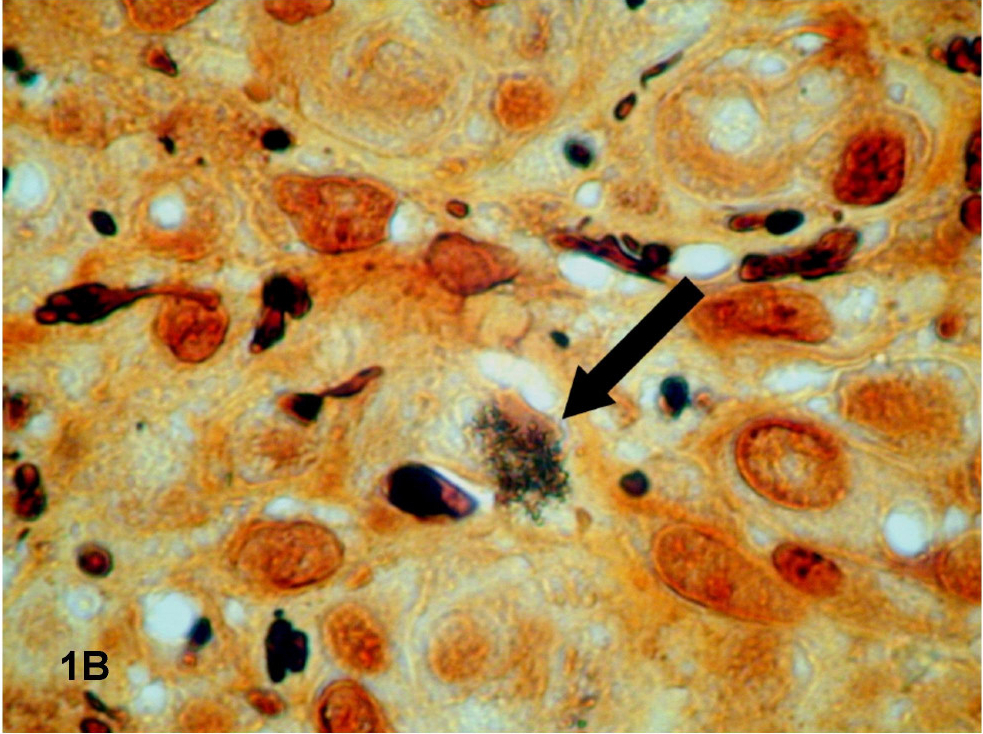
Mycobacterium avium complex

The diseases associated with AIDS, such as Pneumocystis jiroveci pneumonia (PCP) and Mycobacterium avium complex (MAC), are not caused by HIV, but rather result from the immunosuppression caused by HIV disease. As the immune system of an HIV-infected individual weakens, he or she becomes susceptible to the particular viral, fungal, and bacterial infections common in the community. For example, HIV-infected people in the Midwestern United States are much more likely than people in New York City to develop histoplasmosis, which is caused by a fungus. A person in Africa is exposed to pathogens different from individuals in an American city. Children may be exposed to different infectious agents compared to adults.

HIV is the underlying cause of the condition named AIDS, but the additional conditions that may affect an AIDS patient are dependent upon the endemic pathogens to which the patient may be exposed.

=== AIDS cannot be prevented with complementary or alternative medicine ===
Many HIV-infected people turn to complementary and alternative medicine, such as traditional medicine, especially in areas where conventional therapies are less widespread. However, the overwhelming majority of scientifically rigorous research indicates little or negative effect on patient outcomes such as HIV-symptom severity and disease duration, and mixed outcomes on psychological well-being. It is important that patients notify their healthcare provider prior to beginning any treatment, as certain alternative therapies may interfere with conventional treatment.

== See also ==
- International AIDS Society
- Safe sex
- Contaminated haemophilia blood products
- Prevention of HIV/AIDS
