= Willner =

Willner may refer to:

== Surnames ==
- Alfred M. Willner (1859–1929), Austrian composer and librettist
- Arthur Willner (1881–1959), Czech composer
- Hal Willner (1956–2020), American film and television music producer
- Lisa Willner, American politician
- Mats Willner (b. 1968), Swedish journalist
- Robert Willner (b. unknown, d. 1995), American physician from Florida who denied AIDS is caused by HIV

== Places ==
- Rural Municipality of Willner No. 253, Saskatchewan, Canada
