= Joan Shenton =

British-Chilean broadcaster (born 1943)

- Born: Joan Alicia Shenton; 16 March 1943 (age 82); Antofagasta, Chile
- Occupations: Journalist; writer; documentary filmmaker; TV personality
- Website: Immunity Resource Foundation

Joan Alicia Shenton (born 16 March 1943) is a British-Chilean broadcaster who has produced and presented programmes for radio and television.

Shenton is known as an exponent of the ideas of AIDS denial.

== Early life ==
Shenton was born in Antofagasta, Chile to an English father and Anglo-Chilean mother. She lived in Chile, Argentina, Guatemala and Venezuela. When she was 11 she came to England to attend St Catherine's School, Bramley, Surrey.

In 1961, she matriculated as a state scholar at St Anne's College, Oxford, reading Spanish and French, and took an MA degree in Modern Languages.

== Early career ==
In 1964, she joined the BBC World Service, broadcasting in Spanish for the Latin American Service. She reported on London stories for presenter Juan Peirano on Actualidades and Ritmo de Londres.

She then reported in Spanish for the Central Office of Information (COI) on a weekly television programme called This Week in Britain (TWIBS) which was given to British Embassies in Latin America and provided free to the respective countries' television stations.

She became a reporter/presenter for Anglia Television and then BBC's Nationwide, where she worked for Michael Townson, editor of London region.

In 1972, she became seriously ill with drug-induced lupus after excessive medication in Spain. This led to her lifelong interest in injury from prescribed drugs. Together with Lilian Wilding and through the Thames Television Help! programme, Shenton later founded the Steroid Aid Group in 1979 and became honorary president.

After her recovery, she joined Thames Television in 1973 as co-presenter with Tony Bastable on the consumer programme Money-Go-Round, produced by Mary McAnally. During this period, she also presented Thames Television's social affairs programme Help!

Shenton resumed her radio career in 1973, joining Capital Radio under the editorship of Michael Bukht (also known as the chef Michael Barry). She broadcast for Capital from the station's very first day on air, and co-presented a daily three-hour live programme Swap Shop with Tommy Vance. She then went on to present Capital's weekly hospital radio programme called Person to Person.

== Independent producer ==
In 1978, together with Ronnie Noble, Shenton founded her independent production company Meditel Productions and made its first series of programmes about joint replacement surgery together with surgeon Michael Freeman.

She produced and presented for the BBC's Tonight the first live broadcast of a total hip replacement operation relayed from the then London Hospital, Whitechapel to a conference of surgeons in Bern, Switzerland. The programme was relayed by the European Broadcasting Union. In 1980, Meditel made Microsurgeons of Shanghai about Chen Zhong Wei's work on limb and finger replantation (TV Eye, Thames TV).

Around the time Channel 4 was founded, Shenton and business partner Alison Hawkes turned Meditel Productions into a limited company and secured one of Channel 4's first factual programmes commissions. They made Kill or Cure?, two series of programmes on injury from prescribed drugs, together with pharmacologist Dr Andrew Herxheimer. These programmes were used by University College London Medical School to train students of pharmacology.

Other programmes in this period include Who Cares? (Channel 4), a four-part series on comparative healthcare around the world. One of the programmes, Keeping the Beat, which challenged currently held views on fat and cholesterol won the Medical Journalists Association and Pearl Assurance Special Merit Award (1986).

Central Television's Viewpoint series commissioned an international look at approaches to mental illness, Forgotten Millions (1987), which Shenton co-produced with David Cohen. It won the Red Ribbon Award: American Film and Video Association (1989).

A one-hour documentary, Impotence – One in Ten Men, for Channel 4 won the British Medical Association Educational Merit Award (1990).

In the late 1980s, together with Meditel's producer Jad Adams, Meditel made two network six-part series about food, Food – Fad or Fact?, co-produced with Tom Goodison of Television South West. Food – Fad or Fact? "Salt" won the New Jersey Television and Movie Awards (1988). "The Cholesterol Campaign" won at the Houston International Film Festival: Bronze Award, Educational Documentaries (1989).

== AIDS dissident ==
Shenton has made a number of documentary films erroneously claiming that AIDS is not caused by HIV. It is established scientific fact that untreated HIV is the precursor to AIDS.

A programme for Channel 4's Dispatches series (AIDS: The Unheard Voices), produced by Jad Adams, was the first of four Meditel commissions on the subject. It won the Royal Television Society Journalism Award (1988) and Meditel was the first independent production company ever to win this award. There followed The AIDS Catch (Dispatches, 1990), then AZT – Cause for Concern (Dispatches, 1991) which was awarded the British Medical Association Educational Merit Award (1992). AIDS and Africa (Dispatches, 1993) travelled across Africa and challenged the reported figures for AIDS at the time.

During this period, Meditel made a series of reports on the AIDS debate which were shown on Sky News: Amsterdam Alternative AIDS Conference (1992) featuring AIDS denialist, molecular biologist Peter Duesberg; AZT Babies (1992); AIDS Dissidents in Europe (1993). In late 1993 a one-hour documentary called Diary of an AIDS Dissident was transmitted on Sky News.

In 2000, Shenton and Huw Christie, editor of Continuum magazine, made Search for Solutions: The Great AIDS Debate for M-Net's Carte Blanche programme in South Africa. It included a specially granted interview with President Thabo Mbeki.

In 2010, Shenton was part of the Alternative AIDS Conference in Vienna and was amongst a number of denialists interviewed by Russia Today.

The following year, the independent film Positively False: Birth of a Heresy, co-produced with Andi Reiss, was released by Meditel and Yellow Productions. The film brought together highlights from over 60 hours of footage from the Meditel archive, challenging the link between HIV and AIDS. It was nominated for Best Documentary at the Lucerne (2011) and Marbella (2012) International Film Festivals.

In 2014, Shenton and Reiss made a 30-minute documentary, Positive Hell, which followed the lives of five individuals in Northern Spain who survived a diagnosis of HIV while shunning medication for decades. Positive Hell was also nominated for Best Documentary at Marbella International Film Festival (2014) and was selected for the online festivals LACineFest (2015), Digital Griffix, Montreal (2015) and the Indie Festival, Switzerland (2015). Following selection and subsequent banning from London Independent Film Festival, Portobello Film Festival and Bluestockings (New York) in 2016, the film won the Special Jury Prize for World Social Impact at the 2017 Queens World Film Festival. It was also screened at the National Action Network in Harlem and Parents in Action Centre, Jackson Heights.

Shenton is a board member of Rethinking AIDS.

== Other activities ==
Shenton lived for several years in the Dominican Republic where she founded a charity with lawyer and charity administrator Dra Susana Vargas in the Cibao region of the Dominican Republic. The charity, Fundacion Daniel Martinez, promotes sports education and cultural programmes teaching folkloric music and dance. The charity has constructed extra schoolroom wings in five rural schools, a polyclinic and a rehabilitation centre in Puerto Plata hospital.

In 1999, Shenton produced the Home Running documentary in the Dominican Republic for BBC Under the Sun, directed by Kim Flitcroft, about young Dominican baseball players who make it into the US Major League Academies.

Shenton sings with Latin American folk band Altamar which has performed on Capital Radio, at the Royal Albert Hall and in many theatres and wine bars. She is a snooker player, having been a member of the 'B' team at the Portobello Green Snooker Club and participated in the Hammersmith and District Snooker League matches.

== Awards and honours ==
- 1985, Silver Award: Berlin International Consumer Film competition
- 1986, Special Merit Award: Medical Journalists Association and Pearl Assurance
- 1988, International Current Affairs and Journalism Award: Royal Television Society
- 1988, Best Educational Award: New Jersey Television and Movie Awards
- 1989, Bronze Award (Educational Documentaries): Houston International Film Festival
- 1989, Red Ribbon Award: American Film and Video Association
- 1990, Certificate of Educational Merit: British Medical Association
- 1992, Certificate of Educational Merit: British Medical Association
- 2011, Nomination for Best Documentary: Lucerne International Film Festival
- 2012, Nomination for Best Documentary: Marbella International Film Festival
- 2014, Nomination for Best Documentary: Marbella International Film Festival
- 2015, Nomination for Best Documentary: The Indie Festival, Switzerland
- 2015, Nomination for Best Documentary: Digital Griffix Film Festival, Montreal
- 2015, Nomination for Best Documentary: LaCineFest
- 2017, Special Jury Prize for World Social Impact: Queens World Film Festival

== Bibliography ==
Books

- Kill or Cure? Drug Injury and What to Do About it with Jad Adams (1983)
- Positively False: Exposing the Myths around HIV and AIDS (1998)
- The Rough Guide to Merengue and Bachata (Rough Guides Reference Titles) as compiler [Audiobook] (2005)
- The Rough Guide to Bachata (Rough Guides Reference Titles) as compiler [Audiobook] (2007)
- Positively False: Exposing the Myths around HIV and AIDS – 16th Anniversary Edition (2015)

Journals

Lauer H & Shenton J: "Counterproductive contributions to African epidemiology", Madridge Journal of Immunology, Volume 1 Issue 1

=== Programmes and documentaries ===
- London Hospital, Whitechapel, live relay via European Broadcasting Union (EBU) of hip replacement operation to Berne, Switzerland (1978)
- Leukaemia – Total Bone Marrow Transplantation (1978)
- Microsurgeons of Shanghai (1980)
- Kill or Cure? (6-part series) (1982)
- Following the Nation’s Health (1983)
- Health Kick-Back (1984)
- Who Cares? (4 episodes) (1985)
- Dalkon Shield: The Missing Women (1985)
- Ten Million (2 series) (1985)
- Viewpoint '87: Forgotten Millions (1987)
- Kill or Cure? 2 (3 parts) (1987)
- Food – Fad or Fact? (6 parts) (1987)
- AIDS: The Unheard Voices (1987)
- NSAIDs: More Harm than Good (1988)
- Food – Fad or Fact? II (1989)
- Impotence: One in Ten Men (1989)
- HRT: Pause for Thought (1989)
- The AIDS Catch (1990)
- DES Children: Unto the Second Generation (1990)
- Health Circuit (1990)
- AZT: Cause for Concern (1991)
- The Power to Change (1992)
- AIDS and Africa (1992)
- AIDS Dissidents in Europe (1992)
- Amsterdam Alternative AIDS Conference (1992)
- Diary of an AIDS Dissident (1993)
- AZT Babies (1993)
- The Pill Generation (1993)
- Cot Deaths (1995)
- Plastic Surgery techniques (1995)
- Home Running (1999)
- Search for Solutions: The Great AIDS Debate (2000)
- Positively False: Birth of a Heresy (2011)
- Positive Hell (2013)
- Positively Wrong (2017)
