= HIV/AIDS denialism =

False belief that HIV does not cause AIDS

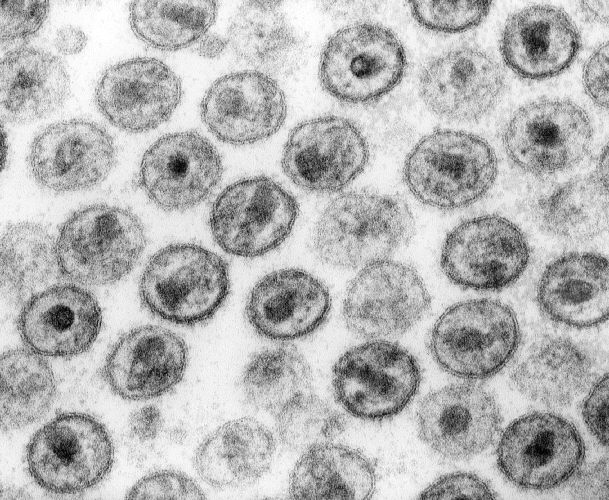
An electron micrograph of the human immunodeficiency virus. HIV/AIDS denialists dispute the existence of HIV or its role in causing AIDS.

HIV/AIDS denialism is the belief, despite evidence to the contrary, that the human immunodeficiency virus (HIV) does not cause acquired immune deficiency syndrome (AIDS). Some of its proponents reject the existence of HIV, while others accept that HIV exists but argue that it is a harmless passenger virus and not the cause of AIDS. Insofar as they acknowledge AIDS as a real disease, they attribute it to some combination of sexual behavior, recreational drugs, malnutrition, poor sanitation, haemophilia, or the effects of the medications used to treat HIV infection (antiretrovirals).

The scientific consensus is that the evidence showing HIV to be the cause of AIDS is conclusive and that HIV/AIDS denialist claims are pseudoscience based on conspiracy theories, faulty reasoning, cherry picking, and misrepresentation of mainly outdated scientific data. As evidence mounted against denialism, combined with those with HIV/AIDS living much longer, these claims stopped being believed. With the rejection of these arguments by the scientific community, HIV/AIDS denialist material is now targeted at less scientifically sophisticated audiences and spread mainly through the Internet, increased substantially since the COVID-19 pandemic.

Despite its lack of scientific acceptance, HIV/AIDS denialism has had a significant political impact, especially in South Africa under the presidency of Thabo Mbeki. Scientists and physicians have raised alarm at the human cost of HIV/AIDS denialism, which discourages HIV-positive people from using proven treatments. Public health researchers have attributed 330,000 to 340,000 AIDS-related deaths, along with 171,000 other HIV infections and 35,000 infant HIV infections, to the South African government's former embrace of HIV/AIDS denialism. The interrupted use of antiretroviral treatments is also a major global concern as it potentially increases the likelihood of the emergence of antiretroviral-resistant strains of the virus.

== History ==
A constellation of symptoms named "gay-related immune deficiency" was noted in 1982. In 1983, a group of scientists and doctors at the Pasteur Institute in France, led by Luc Montagnier, discovered a new virus in a patient with signs and symptoms that often preceded AIDS. They named the virus lymphadenopathy-associated virus, or LAV, and sent samples to Robert Gallo's team in the United States. Their findings were peer reviewed and slated for publication in Science.

At a 23 April 1984 press conference in Washington, D.C., Margaret Heckler, Secretary of Health and Human Services, announced that Gallo and his co-workers had discovered a virus that was the "probable" cause of AIDS. This virus was initially named HTLV-III. In the same year, Casper Schmidt responded to Gallo's papers with "The Group-Fantasy Origins of AIDS", published in the Journal of Psychohistory. Schmidt posited that AIDS was not an actual disease, but rather an example of "epidemic hysteria", in which groups of people subconsciously act out social conflicts. Schmidt compared AIDS to documented cases of epidemic hysteria in the past which were mistakenly thought to be infectious. Schmidt himself later died of AIDS in 1994.

In 1986, the viruses discovered by Montagnier and Gallo, found to be genetically indistinguishable, were renamed HIV.

In 1987, molecular biologist Peter Duesberg questioned the link between HIV and AIDS in the journal Cancer Research. Duesberg's publication coincided with the start of major public health campaigns and the development of zidovudine (AZT) as a treatment for HIV/AIDS.

In 1988, a panel of the Institute of Medicine of the U.S. National Academy of Sciences found that "the evidence that HIV causes AIDS is scientifically conclusive." That same year, Science published Blattner, Gallo, and Temin's "HIV causes AIDS", and Duesberg's "HIV is not the cause of AIDS". Also that same year, the Perth Group, a group of denialists based in Perth, Western Australia, led by Eleni Papadopulos-Eleopulos, published in the non-peer-reviewed journal Medical Hypotheses their first article questioning aspects of HIV/AIDS research, arguing that there was "no compelling reason for preferring the viral hypothesis of AIDS to one based on the activity of oxidising agents."

In 1989, Duesberg exercised his right as a member of the National Academy of Sciences to bypass the peer review process and published his arguments in Proceedings of the National Academy of Sciences of the United States of America (PNAS) unreviewed. The editor of PNAS initially resisted, but ultimately allowed Duesberg to publish, saying, "If you wish to make these unsupported, vague, and prejudicial statements in print, so be it. But I cannot see how this would be convincing to any scientifically trained reader."

In 1990, the physiologist Robert Root-Bernstein published his first peer-reviewed article detailing his objections to the mainstream view of AIDS and HIV. In it, he questioned both the mainstream view and the "dissident" view as potentially inaccurate.

In 1991, The Group for the Scientific Reappraisal of the HIV-AIDS Hypothesis, comprising twelve scientists, doctors, and activists, submitted a short letter to various journals, but the letter was rejected.

In 1993, Nature published an editorial arguing that Duesberg had forfeited his right of reply by engaging in disingenuous rhetorical techniques and ignoring any evidence that conflicted with his claims. That same year, Papadopulos-Eleopulos and coauthors from the Perth Group alleged in the journal Nature Biotechnology (then edited by fellow denialist Harvey Bialy) that the western blot test for HIV was not standardized, non-reproducible, and of unknown specificity due to a claimed lack of a "gold standard".

On 28 October 1994, Robert Willner, a physician whose medical license had been revoked for, among other things, treating an AIDS patient with ozone therapy, publicly jabbed his finger with blood he said was from an HIV-infected patient. Willner died in 1995 of a heart attack.

In 1995, The Group for the Scientific Reappraisal of the HIV-AIDS Hypothesis published a letter in Science similar to the one they had attempted to publish in 1991. That same year, Continuum, a denialist group, placed an advertisement in the British gay and lesbian magazine The Pink Paper offering a £1,000 reward to "the first person finding one scientific paper establishing actual isolation of HIV", according to a set of seven steps they claimed to have been drawn up by the Pasteur Institute in 1973. The challenge was later dismissed by various scientists, including Duesberg, asserting that HIV undoubtedly exists. Stefan Lanka argued in the same year that HIV does not exist. Also that year, the National Institute of Allergy and Infectious Diseases released a report concluding that "abundant epidemiologic, virologic and immunologic data support the conclusion that infection with the human immunodeficiency virus (HIV) is the underlying cause of AIDS."

In 1996, the British Medical Journal published "Response: arguments contradict the "foreign protein-zidovudine" hypothesis" as a response to a petition by Duesberg: "In 1991 Duesberg challenged researchers… We and Darby et al. have provided that evidence". The paper argued that Duesberg was wrong regarding the cause of AIDS in haemophiliacs. In 1997, The Perth Group questioned the existence of HIV, and speculated that the production of antibodies recognizing HIV proteins can be caused by allogenic stimuli and autoimmune disorders. They continued to repeat this speculation through at least 2006.

In 1998, Joan Shenton published the book Positively False: Exposing the Myths Around HIV and AIDS, which promotes AIDS denialism. In the book, Shenton claims that AIDS is a conspiracy created by pharmaceutical companies to make money from selling antiretroviral drugs.

In 2006, Celia Farber, a journalist and prominent HIV/AIDS denialist, published an essay in the March issue of Harper's Magazine entitled "Out of Control: AIDS and the Corruption of Medical Science", in which she summarized a number of arguments for HIV/AIDS denialism and alleged incompetence, conspiracy, and fraud on the part of the medical community. Scientists and AIDS activists extensively criticized the article as inaccurate, misleading, and poorly fact-checked.

In 2007, members of the Perth Group testified at an appeals hearing for Andre Chad Parenzee, asserting that HIV could not be transmitted by heterosexual sex. The judge concluded, "I reject the evidence of Ms Papadopulos-Eleopulos and Dr Turner. I conclude… that they are not qualified to give expert opinions."

In 2009, a paper was published in the then non-peer-reviewed journal Medical Hypotheses by Duesberg and four other researchers which criticized a 2008 study by Chigwedere et al., which found that HIV/AIDS denialism in South Africa resulted in hundreds of thousands of preventable deaths from HIV/AIDS, because the government delayed the provision of antiretroviral drugs. The paper concluded that "the claims that HIV has caused huge losses of African lives are unconfirmed and that HIV is not sufficient or even necessary to cause the previously known diseases, now called AIDS in the presence of antibody against HIV." Later that year, the paper was withdrawn from the journal on the grounds of it having methodological flaws, and that it contained assertions "that could potentially be damaging to global public health". A revised version was later published in Italian Journal of Anatomy and Embryology.

=== US courts ===
In 1998, HIV/AIDS denialism and parental rights clashed with the medical establishment in court when Maine resident Valerie Emerson fought for the right to refuse to give AZT (the first antiretroviral medication to treat HIV/AIDS) to her four-year-old son, Nikolas Emerson, after she witnessed the death of her daughter Tia, who died at the age of three in 1997. Her right to stop treatment was upheld by the court in light of "her unique experience". Nikolas Emerson died eight years later. The family refused to reveal whether the death was AIDS related.

=== South Africa ===
In 2000, South Africa's President Thabo Mbeki invited several HIV/AIDS denialists to join his Presidential AIDS Advisory Panel. A response named the Durban Declaration was issued affirming the scientific consensus that HIV causes AIDS:

The declaration has been signed by over 5,000 people, including Nobel Prize winners, directors of leading research institutions, scientific academies and medical societies, notably the US National Academy of Sciences, the US Institute of Medicine, Max Planck institutes, the European Molecular Biology Organization, the Pasteur Institute in Paris, the Royal Society of London, the AIDS Society of India and the National Institute of Virology in South Africa. In addition, thousands of individual scientists and doctors have signed, including many from the countries bearing the greatest burden of the epidemic. Signatories are of MD, PhD level or equivalent, although scientists working for commercial companies were asked not to sign.

In 2008, University of Cape Town researcher Nicoli Nattrass, and later that year a group of Harvard scientists led by Zimbabwean physician Pride Chigwedere, each independently estimated that Thabo Mbeki's denialist policies led to the early deaths of more than 330,000 South Africans. Barbara Hogan, the health minister appointed by Mbeki's successor, voiced shame over the studies' findings and stated: "The era of denialism is over completely in South Africa."

In 2009, Fraser McNeill wrote an article arguing that South Africa's reluctance to openly address HIV/AIDS resulted from social conventions that prevent people from talking about causes of death in certain situations, rather than from Mbeki's denialist views. Similarly, political scientist Anthony Butler has argued that "South African HIV/AIDS policy can be explained without appeals to leadership irrationality or wider cultural denialism."

In July 2016 Aaron Motsoaledi, the Health Minister of South Africa, wrote an article for the Centre for Health Journalism in which he criticised past South African leaders for their denialism, describing it as an "unlucky moment" in a country which has since become a leader in treatment and prevention.

=== 2020s resurgence ===
Following COVID-19 conspiracy theories being widely spread beginning in 2020, AIDS denialism was also increasingly spread. Suspicion of public health agencies during the COVID-19 pandemic led to a resurgence of conspiracy theories surrounding HIV and AIDS. Misinformation was widely spread on social media companies like Twitter, Gab, Rumble, and Substack, and companies like Amazon and Spotify. Debunked theories from the beginning of the epidemic were revived and increasingly circulated.

== Denialists' claims and scientific evidence ==
The term "HIV/AIDS denialism" denotes the rejection of the mainstream scientific view that AIDS is a medical condition that is brought about by HIV infection. The use of the term encompasses the denial of the existence of the virus (HIV denialism), the denial of the causation of AIDS by HIV (that is, the proposed link between the virus and the syndrome), and the denial of the effects on the human body that are ascribed to HIV (that is, the description and characterization of the virus). In a framework incorporating the second denial and/or the third, criticism of the current scientific view has variously been rested on the claim that HIV has not been adequately isolated, that HIV does not fulfill Koch's postulates, HIV testing is inaccurate, and/or that antibodies to HIV neutralize the virus and render it harmless. Suggested alternative causes of AIDS variously include recreational drugs, malnutrition, and the very antiretroviral drugs used to treat the syndrome.

Such claims have been examined extensively in the peer-reviewed medical and scientific literature; a scientific consensus has arisen that denialist claims have been convincingly disproved, and that HIV does indeed cause AIDS. In the cases cited by Duesberg where HIV "cannot be isolated", PCR or other techniques demonstrate the presence of the virus, and denialist claims of HIV test inaccuracy result from an incorrect or outdated understanding of how HIV antibody testing is performed and interpreted.

Regarding Koch's postulates, New Scientist reported: "It is debatable how appropriate it is to focus on a set of principles devised for bacterial infections in a century when viruses had not yet been discovered. HIV does, however, meet Koch's postulates as long as they are not applied in a ridiculously stringent way". The author then demonstrated how each postulate has been met – the suspected cause is strongly associated with the disease, the suspected pathogen can be both isolated and spread outside the host, and when the suspected pathogen is transmitted to a new and uninfected host, that host develops the disease.

The latter was proven in a number of tragic accidents, including an instance when multiple scientific technicians with no other known risk factors were exposed to concentrated HIV in a laboratory accident, and transmission by a dentist to patients, the majority of whom had no other known risk factor or source of exposure except the same dentist in common. In 2010, Chigwedere and Max Essex demonstrated in the medical journal AIDS and Behavior that HIV as the cause of AIDS fulfills both Koch's postulates and the Bradford Hill criteria for causality.

Early denialist arguments held that the HIV/AIDS paradigm was flawed because it had not led to effective treatments. However, the introduction of highly active antiretroviral therapy in the mid-1990s and dramatic improvements in survival of HIV/AIDS patients reversed this argument, as these treatments were based directly on anti-viral activity and the HIV/AIDS paradigm. The development of effective anti-AIDS therapies based on targeting of HIV has been a major factor in convincing some denialist scientists to accept the causative role of HIV in AIDS.

In a 2010 article on conspiracy theories in science, Ted Goertzel lists HIV/AIDS denialism as an example where scientific findings are being disputed on irrational grounds. He describes proponents as relying on rhetoric, appeal to fairness, and the right to a dissenting opinion rather than on evidence. They frequently invoke the meme of a "courageous independent scientist resisting orthodoxy", invoking the name of persecuted physicist and astronomer Galileo Galilei. Regarding this comparison, Goertzel states:

...being a dissenter from orthodoxy is not difficult; the hard part is actually having a better theory. Publishing dissenting theories is important when they are backed by plausible evidence, but this does not mean giving critics 'equal time' to dissent from every finding by a mainstream scientist.

— Goertzel, 2010

== Denialist community ==
Denialists often use their critique of the link between HIV and AIDS to promote alternative medicine as a cure, and attempt to convince HIV-positive individuals to avoid ARV therapy in favour of vitamins, massage, yoga and other unproven treatments. Despite this promotion, denialists will often downplay any association with alternative therapies, and attempt to portray themselves as "dissidents". An article in the Skeptical Inquirer stated:

AIDS denialists [prefer] to characterize themselves as brave "dissidents" attempting to engage a hostile medical/industrial establishment in genuine scientific "debate". They complain that their attempts to raise questions and pose alternative hypotheses have been unjustly rejected or ignored at the cost of scientific progress itself...Given their resistance to all evidence to the contrary, today's AIDS dissidents are more aptly referred to as AIDS denialists.

Several scientists have been associated with HIV/AIDS denialism, although they have not themselves studied AIDS or HIV. One of the most famous and influential is Duesberg, professor of molecular and cell biology at the University of California, Berkeley, who since 1987 has disputed that the scientific evidence shows that HIV causes AIDS. Other scientists associated with HIV/AIDS denialism include biochemists David Rasnick and Harvey Bialy. Biologist Lynn Margulis argued that "there's no evidence that HIV is an infectious virus" and that AIDS symptoms "overlap...completely" with those of syphilis.

Pathologist Étienne de Harven expressed sympathy for HIV/AIDS denial. AIDS researcher Seth Kalichman lists biochemist and Nobelist Kary Mullis "among the who's who of AIDS pseudoscientists". Mullis, who did not do any HIV research, expressed skepticism about the relationship between HIV and AIDS in his 1998 autobiography.

Additional notable HIV/AIDS denialists include Australian academic ethicist Hiram Caton, the late mathematician Serge Lang, former college administrator Henry Bauer, journalist Celia Farber, American talk radio host and author on alternative and complementary medicine and nutrition Gary Null, former General Practitioner Vernon Coleman and the late activist Christine Maggiore, who encouraged HIV-positive mothers to forgo anti-HIV treatment and whose 3-year-old daughter died of complications of untreated AIDS. Nate Mendel, bassist with the rock band Foo Fighters, expressed support for HIV/AIDS denialist ideas and organized a benefit concert in January 2000 for Maggiore's organization Alive & Well AIDS Alternatives. Organizations of HIV/AIDS denialists include the Perth Group, composed of several Australian hospital workers, and the Immunity Resource Foundation.

HIV/AIDS denialism has received some support from political conservatives in the United States. Duesberg's work has been published in Policy Review, a journal once published by The Heritage Foundation but later acquired by the Hoover Institution, and by Regnery Publishing. Regnery published Duesberg's Inventing the AIDS Virus in 1996, and journalist Tom Bethell's The Politically Incorrect Guide to Science, in which he endorses HIV/AIDS denialism, in 2005.

Law professor Phillip E. Johnson has accused the Centers for Disease Control of "fraud" in relation to HIV/AIDS. Describing the political aspects of the HIV/AIDS denialism movement, sociology professor Steven Epstein wrote in Impure Science that "... the appeal of Duesberg's views to conservatives—certainly including those with little sympathy for the gay movement—cannot be denied." The blog LewRockwell.com has also published articles supportive of HIV/AIDS denialism.

In a follow-up article in Skeptical Inquirer, Nattrass overviewed the prominent members of the HIV/AIDS denialist community and discussed the reasons of the intractable staying power of HIV/AIDS denialism in spite of scientific and medical consensus supported by over two decades of evidence. She observed that despite being a disparate group of people with very different background and professions, the HIV/AIDS denialists self-organize to fill four important roles:

- "Hero scientists" to provide scientific legitimacy: Most notably Duesberg who plays the central role of HIV/AIDS denialism from the beginning. Others include David Rasnick, Étienne de Harven, and Kary Mullis whose Nobel Prize makes him symbolically important.
- "Cultropreneurs" to offer fake cures in place of antiretroviral therapy: Matthias Rath, Gary Null, Michael Ellner, and Roberto Giraldo all promote alternative medicine and remedies with a dose of conspiracy theories in the form of books, healing products, radio shows and counseling services.
- HIV-positive "living icons" to provide proof of concept by appearing to live healthily without antiretroviral therapy: Christine Maggiore was and still is the most important icon in the HIV/AIDS denialist movement despite the fact that she died of AIDS related complications in 2008.
- "Praise singers": sympathetic journalists and filmmakers who publicize the movement with uncritical and favorable opinion. They include journalists Celia Farber, Liam Scheff and Neville Hodgkinson; filmmakers Brent Leung and Robert Leppo.

Some of them had overlapping roles as board members of Rethinking AIDS and Alive and Well AIDS Alternatives, were involved in the film House of Numbers, The Other Side of AIDS or on Thabo Mbeki's AIDS Advisory Panel. Nattrass argued that HIV/AIDS denialism gains social traction through powerful community-building effects where these four organized characters form "a symbiotic connection between AIDS denialism and alternative healing modalities" and they are "facilitated by a shared conspiratorial stance toward HIV science".

=== Former denialists ===
Several of the few prominent scientists who once voiced doubts about HIV/AIDS have since changed their views and accepted the fact that HIV plays a role in causing AIDS, in response to an accumulation of newer studies and data. Root-Bernstein, author of Rethinking AIDS: The Tragic Cost of Premature Consensus and formerly a critic of the causative role of HIV in AIDS, has since distanced himself from the HIV/AIDS denialist movement, saying, "Both the camp that says HIV is a pussycat and the people who claim AIDS is all HIV are wrong... The denialists make claims that are clearly inconsistent with existing studies."

Joseph Sonnabend, who until the late 1990s regarded the issue of AIDS causation as unresolved, has reconsidered in light of the success of newer antiretroviral drugs, stating, "The evidence now strongly supports a role for HIV… Drugs that can save your life can also under different circumstances kill you. This is a distinction that denialists do not seem to understand." Sonnabend has also criticized HIV/AIDS denialists for falsely implying that he supports their position, saying:

Some individuals who believe that HIV plays no role at all in AIDS have implied that I support their misguided views on AIDS causation by including inappropriate references to me in their literature and on their web sites. Before HIV was discovered and its association with AIDS established, I held the entirely appropriate view that the cause of AIDS was then unknown. I have successfully treated hundreds of AIDS patients with antiretroviral medications, and have no doubt that HIV plays a necessary role in this disease.

A former denialist wrote in the Journal of Medical Ethics in 2004:

The group [of denialists] regularly points to a substantial number of scientists supportive of its agenda to re-evaluate the HIV/AIDS hypothesis. Some of those members still listed are people who have been dead for a number of years. While it is correct that these people supported the objective of a scientific re-evaluation of the HIV/AIDS link when they were alive, it is clearly difficult to ascertain what these people would have made of the scientific developments and the accumulation of evidence for HIV as the crucial causative agent in AIDS, which has occurred in the years after their deaths.

=== Death of HIV-positive denialists ===
In 2007, aidstruth.org, a website run by HIV researchers to counter denialist claims, published a partial list of HIV/AIDS denialists who had died of AIDS-related causes. For example, the editors of the magazine Continuum consistently denied the existence of HIV/AIDS. The magazine shut down after both editors died of AIDS-related causes. In each case, the HIV/AIDS denialist community attributed the deaths to unknown causes, secret drug use, or stress rather than HIV/AIDS. Similarly, several HIV-positive former dissidents have reported being ostracized by the AIDS-denialist community after they developed AIDS and decided to pursue effective antiretroviral treatment.

In 2008, activist Christine Maggiore died at the age of 52 while under a doctor's care for pneumonia. Maggiore, mother of two children, had founded an organisation to help other HIV-positive mothers avoid taking antiretroviral drugs that reduce the risk of HIV transmission from mother to child. After her three-year-old daughter died of AIDS-related pneumonia in 2005, Maggiore continued to believe that HIV is not the cause of AIDS, and she and her husband Robin Scovill sued Los Angeles County and others on behalf of their daughter's estate, for allegedly violating Eliza Scovill's civil rights by releasing an autopsy report that listed her cause of death as AIDS-related pneumonia. The litigants settled out of court, with the county paying Scovill $15,000 in March 2009, with no admission of wrongdoing. The Los Angeles coroner's ruling that Eliza Scovill died of AIDS remains the official verdict.

=== Local community group denialism ===
Australia: In 2009 representing the then Australian Vaccination-Skeptics Network, President Meryl Dorey signed a petition claiming that "the AIDS industry and the media" had tricked the public and the media into believing that HIV causes AIDS.

Canada: The Alberta Reappraising AIDS Society created the petition in March 2000 and has reportedly since attracted "2,951 doubters" representing groups and individuals. Signatories reportedly deny "that Aids is heterosexually transmitted".

== Impact beyond the scientific community ==
AIDS-denialist claims have failed to attract support in the scientific community, where the evidence for the causative role of HIV in AIDS is considered conclusive. However, the movement has had a significant impact in the political sphere, culminating with former South African President Thabo Mbeki's embrace of AIDS-denialist claims. The resulting governmental refusal to provide effective anti-HIV treatment in South Africa has been blamed for hundreds of thousands of premature AIDS-related deaths in South Africa.

=== North America and Europe ===
Skepticism about HIV being the cause of AIDS began almost immediately after the discovery of HIV was announced. One of the earliest prominent skeptics was the journalist John Lauritsen, who argued in his writings for the New York Native that amyl nitrite poppers played a role in AIDS, and that the Centers for Disease Control and Prevention had used statistical methods that concealed this. Lauritsen's The AIDS War was published in 1993.

==== Scientific literature ====
The publication of Duesberg's first AIDS paper in 1987 provided visibility for denialist claims. Shortly afterwards, the journal Science reported that Duesberg's remarks had won him "a large amount of media attention, particularly in the gay press where he is something of a hero." However, Duesberg's support in the gay community diminished as he made a series of statements regarded as homophobic; in an interview with The Village Voice in 1988, Duesberg stated his belief that the AIDS epidemic was "caused by a lifestyle that was criminal twenty years ago."

In the following few years, others became skeptical of the HIV theory as researchers initially failed to produce an effective treatment or vaccine for AIDS. Journalists such as Neville Hodgkinson and Celia Farber regularly promoted denialist ideas in the American and British media; several television documentaries were also produced to increase awareness of the alternative viewpoint. In 1992–1993, The Sunday Times, where Hodgkinson served as scientific editor, ran a series of articles arguing that the AIDS epidemic in Africa was a myth. These articles stressed Duesberg's claims and argued that antiviral therapy was ineffective, HIV testing unreliable, and that AIDS was not a threat to heterosexuals. The Sunday Times coverage was heavily criticized as slanted, misleading, and potentially dangerous; the scientific journal Nature took the unusual step of printing a 1993 editorial calling the paper's coverage of HIV/AIDS "seriously mistaken, and probably disastrous."

Finding difficulty in publishing his arguments in the scientific literature, Duesberg exercised his right as a member of the National Academy of Sciences to publish in Proceedings of the National Academy of Sciences of the United States of America (PNAS) without going through the peer review process. However, Duesberg's paper raised a "red flag" at the journal and was submitted by the editor for non-binding review. All of the reviewers found major flaws in Duesberg's paper; the reviewer specifically chosen by Duesberg noted the presence of "misleading arguments", "nonlogical statements", "misrepresentations", and political overtones. Ultimately, the editor of PNAS acquiesced to publication, writing to Duesberg: "If you wish to make these unsupported, vague, and prejudicial statements in print, so be it. But I cannot see how this would be convincing to any scientifically trained reader."

HIV/AIDS denialists often resort to special pleading to support their assertion, arguing for different causes of AIDS in different locations and subpopulations. In North America, AIDS is blamed on the health effects of unprotected anal sex and poppers on homosexual men, an argument which does not account for AIDS in drug-free heterosexual women who deny participating in anal sex. In this case, HIV/AIDS denialists claim the women are having anal sex but refuse to disclose it. In haemophiliac North American children who contracted HIV from blood transfusions, the haemophilia itself or its treatment is claimed to cause AIDS.

In Africa, AIDS is blamed on poor nutrition and sanitation due to poverty. For wealthy populations in South Africa with adequate nutrition and sanitation, it is claimed that the antiretroviral drugs used to treat AIDS cause the condition. In each case, the most parsimonious explanation and uniting factor – HIV positive status – is ignored, as are the thousands of studies that converge on the common conclusion that AIDS is caused by HIV infection.

Haemophilia is considered the best test of the HIV-AIDS hypothesis by both denialists and AIDS researchers. While Duesberg claims AIDS in haemophiliacs is caused by contaminated clotting factors and HIV is a harmless passenger virus, this result is contradicted by large studies on haemophiliac patients who received contaminated blood. A comparison of groups receiving high, medium and low levels of contaminated clotting factors found the death rates differed significantly depending on HIV status. Of 396 HIV positive haemophiliacs followed between 1985 and 1993, 153 died. The comparative figure for the HIV negative group was one out of 66, despite comparable doses of contaminated clotting factors. A comparison of individuals receiving blood donations also supports the results. In 1994 there were 6,888 individuals with AIDS who had their HIV infection traced to blood transfusions. Since the introduction of HIV testing, the number of individuals whose AIDS status can be traced to blood transfusions was only 29 (as of 1994).

==== Lay press and on the Internet ====
With the introduction of highly active antiretroviral therapy (HAART) in 1996–1997, the survival and general health of people with HIV improved significantly. The positive response to treatment with anti-HIV medication cemented the scientific acceptance of the HIV/AIDS paradigm, and led several prominent HIV/AIDS denialists to accept the causative role of HIV. Finding their arguments increasingly discredited by the scientific community, denialists took their message to the popular press. A former denialist wrote:

Scientists among the HIV dissidents used their academic credentials and academic affiliations to generate interest, sympathy, and allegiances in lay audiences. They were not professionally troubled about recruiting lay people—who were clearly unable to evaluate the scientific validity or otherwise of their views—to their cause.

In addition to elements of the popular and alternative press, AIDS denialist ideas are propagated largely via the Internet.

A 2007 article in PLoS Medicine noted:

Because these denialist assertions are made in books and on the Internet rather than in the scientific literature, many scientists are either unaware of the existence of organized denial groups, or believe they can safely ignore them as the discredited fringe. And indeed, most of the HIV deniers' arguments were answered long ago by scientists. However, many members of the general public do not have the scientific background to critique the assertions put forth by these groups, and not only accept them but continue to propagate them.

==== Lay opinion and AIDS-related behaviors ====
AIDS activists have expressed concern that denialist arguments about HIV's harmlessness may be responsible for an upsurge in HIV infections. Denialist claims continue to exert a significant influence in some communities; a survey conducted at minority gay pride events in four American cities in 2005 found that 33% of attendees doubted that HIV caused AIDS. Similarly, a 2010 survey of 343 people living with HIV/AIDS found that one in five of them thought that there was no proof that HIV caused AIDS, and that HIV treatments did more harm than good.

According to Stephen Thomas, director of the Center for Minority Health at University of Pittsburgh Graduate School of Public Health, "people are focusing on the wrong thing. They're focusing on conspiracies rather than protecting themselves, rather than getting tested and seeking out appropriate care and treatment." African Americans are exceptionally likely to believe that HIV does not cause AIDS, partly because they sometimes perceive evidence of the role of HIV in the disease as part of a racist agenda. A 2012 survey of young adults in Cape Town, South Africa, found that belief in AIDS denialism was strongly related to an increased probability of engaging in unsafe sex.

=== South Africa ===
HIV/AIDS denialist claims have had a major political, social, and public health impact in South Africa. The government of then President Thabo Mbeki was sympathetic to the views of HIV/AIDS denialists, with critics charging that denialist influence was responsible for the slow and ineffective governmental response to the country's massive AIDS epidemic.

Independent studies have arrived at almost identical estimates of the human costs of HIV/AIDS denialism in South Africa. According to a paper written by researchers from the Harvard School of Public Health, between 2000 and 2005, more than 330,000 deaths and an estimated 35,000 infant HIV infections occurred "because of a failure to accept the use of available [antiretroviral drugs] to prevent and treat HIV/AIDS in a timely manner." Nicoli Nattrass of the University of Cape Town estimates that 343,000 excess AIDS-related deaths and 171,000 infections resulted from the Mbeki administration's policies, an outcome she refers to in the words of Peter Mandelson as "genocide by sloth".

==== Durban Declaration ====
In 2000, when the International AIDS Conference was held in Durban, Mbeki convened a Presidential Advisory Panel containing a number of HIV/AIDS denialists, including Duesberg and David Rasnick. The Advisory Panel meetings were closed to the general press; an invited reporter from the Village Voice wrote that Rasnick advocated that HIV testing be legally banned and denied that he had seen "any evidence" of an AIDS catastrophe in South Africa, while Duesberg "gave a presentation so removed from African medical reality that it left several local doctors shaking their heads."

In his address to the International AIDS Conference, Mbeki reiterated his view that HIV was not wholly responsible for AIDS, leading hundreds of delegates to walk out on his speech. Mbeki also sent a letter to a number of world leaders likening the mainstream AIDS research community to supporters of the apartheid regime. The tone and content of Mbeki's letter led diplomats in the U.S. to initially question whether it was a hoax.

AIDS scientists and activists were dismayed at the president's behavior and responded with the Durban Declaration, a document affirming that HIV causes AIDS, signed by over 5,000 scientists and physicians.

==== Criticism of governmental response ====
The former South African health minister Manto Tshabalala-Msimang also attracted heavy criticism, as she often promoted nutritional remedies such as garlic, lemons, beetroot and olive oil, to people suffering from AIDS, while emphasizing possible toxicities of antiretroviral drugs, which she has referred to as "poison". The South African Medical Association has accused Tshabalala-Msimang of "confusing a vulnerable public". In September 2006, a group of over 80 scientists and academics called for "the immediate removal of Dr. Tshabalala-Msimang as minister of health and for an end to the disastrous, pseudoscientific policies that have characterized the South African government's response to HIV/AIDS." In December 2006, deputy health minister Nozizwe Madlala-Routledge described "denial at the very highest levels" over AIDS.

Former South African president Thabo Mbeki's government was widely criticized for delaying the rollout of programs to provide antiretroviral drugs to people with advanced HIV disease and to HIV-positive pregnant women. The national treatment program began only after the Treatment Action Campaign (TAC) brought a legal case against Government ministers, claiming they were responsible for the deaths of 600 HIV-positive people a day who could not access medication. South Africa was one of the last countries in the region to begin such a treatment program, and roll-out has been much slower than planned.

At the XVI International AIDS Conference, Stephen Lewis, UN special envoy for AIDS in Africa, attacked Mbeki's government for its slow response to the AIDS epidemic and reliance on denialist claims:

It [South Africa] is the only country in Africa … whose government is still obtuse, dilatory and negligent about rolling out treatment… It is the only country in Africa whose government continues to promote theories more worthy of a lunatic fringe than of a concerned and compassionate state.

In 2002, Mbeki requested that HIV/AIDS denialists no longer use his name in their literature and stop signing documents with "Member of President Mbeki's AIDS Advisory Panel". This coincided with the South African government's statement accompanying its 2002 AIDS campaign, that "...in conducting this campaign, government's starting point is based on the premise that HIV causes AIDS". Mbeki continued to promote and defend AIDS-denialist claims. His loyalists attacked former President Nelson Mandela in 2002 when Mandela questioned the government's AIDS policy, and Mbeki attacked Malegapuru William Makgoba, one of South Africa's leading scientists, as a racist defender of "Western science" for opposing HIV/AIDS denialism.

In early 2005, former South African President Nelson Mandela announced that his son had died of complications of AIDS. Mandela's public announcement was seen as both an effort to combat the stigma associated with AIDS, and as a "political statement designed to… force the President [Mbeki] out of his denial."

==== Post-Mbeki government in South Africa ====
In 2008, Mbeki was ousted from power and replaced as President of South Africa by Kgalema Motlanthe. On Motlanthe's first day in office, he removed Manto Tshabalala-Msimang, the controversial health minister who had promoted AIDS-denialist claims and recommended garlic, beetroot, and lemon juice as treatments for AIDS. Barbara Hogan, newly appointed as health minister, voiced shame at the Mbeki government's embrace of HIV/AIDS denialism and vowed a new course, stating: "The era of denialism is over completely in South Africa." Since then, thanks to the introduction of fixed-dose combination and an increase in the eligibility antiretroviral therapy for South Africans, the number of South African people with HIV undergoing ART has increased to 91.5% and viral suppression in South Africans on ART has increased to 72% for women and 45.8% for men.

== See also ==
- Discredited HIV/AIDS origins theories
- Germ theory denialism
- Misconceptions about HIV and AIDS
- Vaccine hesitancy

General:

- Anti-intellectualism
- List of global issues
