= Herbert Vilakazi =

South African sociologist (1943–2016)

Professor Herbert Mzwakhe Vilakazi
- Born: Professor Herbert M. Vilakazi; 10 May 1943; Nongoma, South Africa
- Died: 26 January 2016 (aged 72); Pretoria, South Africa
- Education: Columbia University
- Scientific career
- Fields: Sociology
- Workplaces: University of Cape Town; University of the Witwatersrand; University of Zululand; University of Transkei

Professor Herbert M. Vilakazi (18 May 1943 in Nongoma – 26 January 2016 in Pretoria) was a South African sociologist. He was known for his opposition to South Africa's apartheid system, which motivated him to try to dismantle it from the inside by becoming a professor at the University of Transkei, despite the protests of the African National Congress. He was also a prominent critic of Western medicine, and promoted ubhejane as a treatment for HIV/AIDS.

== Biography ==
Vilakazi was born on 18 May 1943 in Nongoma, Zululand District Municipality, South Africa. In 1957, he moved to Hartford, Connecticut after his father accepted a teaching position there. In 1958, at the age of 15, he wrote a letter to Martin Luther King Jr., in which he praised King's then-recently published book Stride Toward Freedom: The Montgomery Story.

He was educated at Columbia University (B.A., 1966; M.A., 1968), and then taught sociology at Essex County College from 1969 to 1980. He then left Essex County College to become a professor at the University of Transkei, remaining on their faculty until 1984. During his tenure at the University of Transkei, he and several of his colleagues were deported for alleged subversive activities. His subsequent positions included stints teaching at the University of Cape Town from 1985 to 1986, at Wits University during the 1987 academic year, and at the University of Zululand from 1988 to 1998. From 1997 until his retirement in 2004, he was the Deputy Chair Person of the Electoral Commission of South Africa.

He died on 26 January 2016 of prostate cancer.
