= St Catherine's School, Bramley =

Coordinates: 51.197°N 0.558°W

St Catherine's
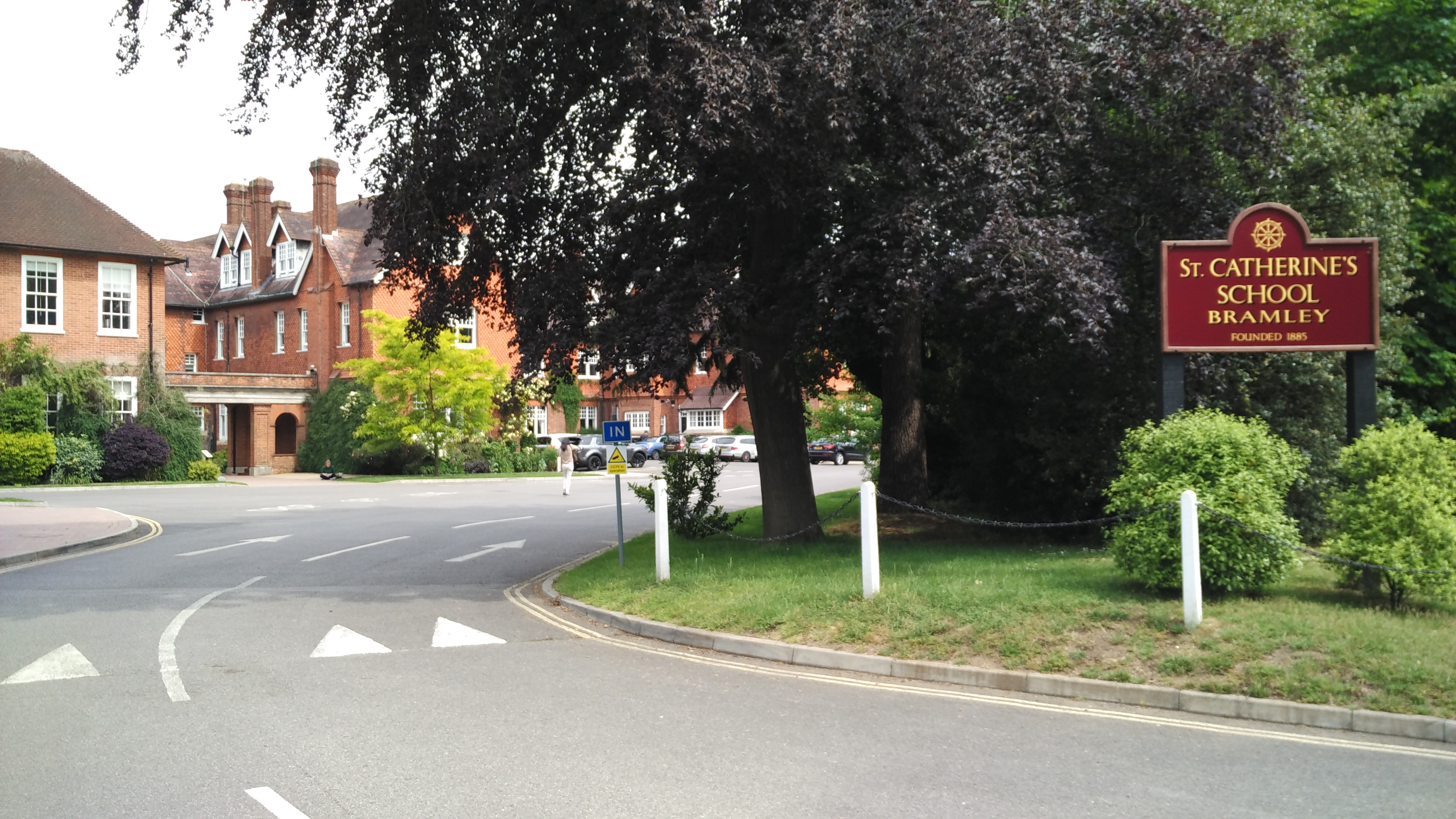

Location
- Station Road; Bramley; Guildford, Surrey, GU5 0DF; England

Information
- Type: Private day and boarding school
- Motto: Let us go on
- Religious affiliation: Church of England
- Established: 1885
- Department for Education URN: 125320 Tables
- Headmistress: Emma Watson
- Chaplain: Benjamin McNair Scott
- Gender: Girls
- Age: 3 to 18
- Enrolment: 870~
- Website: www.stcatherines.info

St Catherine's School is an independent girls' boarding and day school in the village of Bramley, near Guildford, Surrey, England. The school is divided into a senior school, for ages 11–18, and a preparatory school for girls aged 3–11.

== History ==
St Catherine's School opened in 1885 with seventeen pupils, 11 boarders and 9 day pupils. Miss Susan Burnett was the founding headmistress. The school was founded during a time when various movements within the Church of England and other Christian denominations were pushing for more freedom for women, especially in matters such as participating in services and in education. A group of local country gentry formed a committee to establish a school for ‘middle class’ girls – among them were Revd. Canon Musgrave, Revd. John Sapte, the George Cubitt (later Lord Ashcombe), Joseph Merriman, Headmaster of Cranleigh and the MP for South Surrey William Brodrick.

A notable feature of the campus is the chapel, which was completed in 1894 and is known for its Kempe stained glass windows and the 1899 Father Willis organ. In September 2011 the school celebrated 125 years of education for girls and young women and in July 2011 it marked the opening of the 125th Anniversary Halls, a new set of facilities for sports and the arts. In 2019 a new Prep science facility, the WonderLab was opened, in 2021 a new Sixth Form Centre was added 'The 6' and in 2022 a major extension to the creative arts was unveiled - a new Art & MakerSpace.

== Academics ==
In the year 2023, 60.3% of the students scored A*/A at A Level and 88% Grade 9-7 at GCSE .

== Scholarships ==
Academic scholarships are offered for entry at 11+ and for year 11 and/or Sixth Form, alongside additional awards for excellence in art, sport, and music.

== Extracurricular activities ==
Over 100 clubs are on offer from Debating to Medical Reading Club, Astrophysics to Gardening, Construction to Eco-Club. The girls take part in a wide range of sports, including netball, tennis, cricket, swimming, and lacrosse. The school has four lacrosse pitches and a reputation as winner of the 'triple' in the Lacrosse National Schools Championships.

The school hosts a variety of creative arts, with the students regularly taking part in art, textiles, design technology, home economics, drama and music lessons.

== Pastoral care ==
=== Houses ===
All pupils, both day girls and boarders, are assigned to one of the six houses. The houses compete in Inter-House competitions throughout the year. Boarders of 26 different nationalities make up around a quarter of its pupils while day girls travel from villages and towns such as Woking, Haslemere, Dorking, Cobham and Cranleigh. The senior school houses are:

- Ashcombe (red)
- Merriman (purple)
- Midleton (royal blue)
- Musgrave (pink)
- Russell Baker (light blue)
- Stoner (green)

And for the Prep School the houses are:

- Pankhurst (red)
- Teresa (green)
- Curie (yellow)

There are four boarding houses at the school which are Bronte, Symes, Keller and a separate house for the Sixth Form, called 'The 6'.

=== Spiritual ===
As a Church of England school, pupils attend chapel weekly and actively participate in the service. Some pupils sing in the Guildford Cathedral girls' choir. The school began offering organ scholarships in 2006 to encourage more girls to participate in church music.

== Patron ==
The patron of the school since 2015 is Queen Camilla, whose great-great grandfather George Cubitt, 1st Baron Ashcombe, and his wife Laura, Lady Ashcombe were among the founders of the school.

== Notable former pupils ==
- Sara Crowe - actress
- U. A. Fanthorpe – poet
- Joan Greenwood - stage, film and television actress
- Isabel Hardman – Political Journalist, Assistant Editor of The Spectator
- Ann Hogarth – puppeteer
- Davina McCall – television presenter
- Dianna Melrose – British Ambassador to Cuba (2008–2012) and High Commissioner to Tanzania (2013–)
- Joan Shenton – broadcaster
- Juliet Stevenson – stage, film and television actress
- Francine Stock – journalist and radio presenter
- Philippa Stroud, Baroness Stroud – Conservative peer
- Barbara Euphan Todd – children's writer
- Dorothy Tutin – stage, film and television actress
- Lily Travers – film actress
- Poppy Drayton – film and television actress
- Lucy Watson – reality tv performer
