= Jad Adams =

British writer and television producer

- Born: Jad Adams; 27 November 1954 (age 71); London, England
- Occupations: Author, television producer
- Partner: Julie Peakman
- Website: Jad Adams

Jad Adams (born 27 November 1954) is a British writer and television producer.

== Education ==
Adams attended Forest Hill School and the University of Sussex where he was influenced by the lectures of radical philosopher Paul Feyerabend on questions of scientific and historical method. He took an MA in Victorian History at Birkbeck, University of London.

== Early career ==
Adams trained as a journalist on the South East London Mercury newspaper where he won the Young Journalist of the Year award in 1978. From 1979 he worked as a freelance news reporter on Fleet Street for various national titles. His break into television came when he was recruited by Tom Bower to work as a researcher on the BBC's flagship current affairs programme Panorama. Adams worked on various investigations, including Called to Account on the mysterious death of Roberto Calvi, which won the Royal Television Society award for international current affairs in 1982.

At the end of 1982, Adams was recruited by Joan Shenton to work with her company Meditel Productions on Kill or Cure?, a series about the pharmaceutical industry and damage caused by prescription drugs for Channel 4. This started a fruitful collaboration with Shenton, and Adams stayed with Meditel to move through the editorial grades to become a series producer and producer/director. In six years working with Meditel, his most successful programme was AIDS: The Unheard Voices for Channel 4’s Dispatches, about the views of leading scientists who questioned whether the cause of AIDS had been correctly identified as HIV. The programme won the Royal Television Society award for Best International Documentary in 1986 and stimulated Adams to write his first book, AIDS: The HIV Myth.

He later concentrated on history and current affairs programmes, working with Phillip Whitehead at Brook Productions on Dynasty: The Nehru-Gandhi Story for BBC and PBS while writing the book to accompany the series. He later worked with Roger Bolton at Roger Bolton Productions on current affairs and cultural programmes for ITV.

== Writing career ==
Adams' biography of Tony Benn was first published in 1992, it was updated and reissued with additional chapters to cover the intervening 20 years in 2011. To work on it, Adams had otherwise unparalleled access to the extensive Benn Archive and fifteen million words of manuscript diary. The biography was updated and re-released in 2025 in time for the 100th anniversary of Benn's birth. Adams co-organised a conference called The Benn Legacy, held at Westminster University, to discuss Benn's lasting influence.

He has specialised in writing books on nationalists and radicals, with biographies of Emmeline Pankhurst and Gandhi. Women and the Vote: A World History was published in 2014 dealing with how women got the vote in different countries. It was described as ‘impressive in its reach, authoritative in its meticulous research.’

Adams' interest in the literature of the 1890s led him to become a specialist in fin-de-siècle studies, writing a biography of the decadent poet Ernest Dowson, a biography of Kipling and a history of absinthe, as well as many academic journal articles. The Spectator has described him as "an extraordinary polymath". Madder Music, Stronger Wine: The Life of Ernest Dowson was re-released, updated, in 2025.

He frequently contributes reviews and other pieces to national newspapers and magazines. Between 2007 and 2022 he contributed a regular history column to the leading genealogy publication Who Do You Think You Are? magazine. Since 2022 he has been a theatre reviewer for the online site Plays to See.

In 2023 he and Julie Peakman set up Meles Meles Marks, a publishing company which will put out their less commercial books and republish their back catalogue. The first publication was Adams' novel Café Europa which is about four young people visiting a Greek island and encountering romance but also crime and corruption. The book is set before the Brexit vote; Adams has said the surtitle ‘Before Brexit there was …’ 'responds to the sense of loss felt by young people who are now denied the ease of work and settlement in the EU which used to be taken for granted.'

His Decadent Women: Yellow Book Lives of 2023 was the culmination of 20 years of research aimed at rediscovering the 'forgotten women' of the 1890s who contributed to the iconic journal the Yellow Book.

== Personal life ==
Adams has lived with fellow historian Julie Peakman since 1983. They live in London and on the Greek island of Leros where they have been involved in humanitarian work with refugees.

== Public affairs ==
Adams has been chair of Croydon-based homelessness charity Nightwatch since 1992. He frequently comments on public affairs; he is a critic of corruption in local government and of what he sees as a decline in representative government.

== Awards ==
- 2011, Mayor's London Peace Award
- 2006, Fellow of the Institute of English, School of Advanced Study, University of London
- 1997, Fellow of the Royal Historical Society
- 1987, Royal Television Society Producer/Director – AIDS: The Unheard Voices
- 1977, British Press Awards Young Journalist of the Year

== Selected works ==
Books

- (2023) Cafe Europa - ISBN 978-1-80068-966-4
- (2020) The Banyan Tree and her Roots - ISBN 978-9382622345
- (2016) Women and the Vote: A World History - ISBN 978-0198706854
- (2015) Gandhi: Naked Ambition - ISBN 978-0857381613
- (2005) Kipling - ISBN 978-1904950196
- (2004) Hideous Absinthe: A History of the "Devil in a Bottle" - ISBN 978-0299200008
- (2003) Pankhurst (Life & Times) ISBN 978-1-904341536, 9781836540212
- (2000) Madder Music, Stronger Wine: The Life of Ernest Dowson, Poet and Decadent ISBN 978-9380853581
- (1997) Dynasty: The Nehru-Gandhi Story ISBN 978-0-788191237, 9781785909498
- (1992) Tony Benn: A Biography ISBN 978-1849540964
- (1989) AIDS: The HIV Myth - ISBN 978-0312028596

=== Television documentaries ===
- The Real East Enders (2002) (series producer)
- So You Want to be Mayor? (2000) (series producer)
- The Clintons: A Marriage of Sex, Lies and Power (2000) (producer)
- Kitchener: The Empire’s Flawed Hero (1998) (producer)
- Dynasty: The Nehru-Gandhi Story (1996) (researcher)
- Food – Fad or Fact? II (1989) (6 parts, series producer/director)
  - "Are Additives Necessary?"
  - "Are Additives Safe?"
  - "Food Intolerance"
  - "The Cholesterol Campaign"
  - "Food Poisoning"
  - "Food Irradiation"
- AIDS: The Unheard Voices (1987) (producer/director)
- Food – Fad or Fact? (1987) (6 parts, producer)
  - "A Little of What You Fancy Does You Good"
  - "Are Fats Harmful?"
  - "The Battle of the Fats"
  - "Sugar"
  - "Salt"
  - "Fibre"
- Kill or Cure? 2 (1987) (3 parts, producer of 1)
- Ten Million (1985–86) (2 series, series producer)
- Who Cares? (1985) (4 parts, researcher)
  - "Health for All"
  - "Keeping the Beat"
  - "The Time Bomb of Old Age"
  - "Health Care: Right or Privilege?"
- Kill or Cure? (1983) (6 parts, researcher)
- Called to Account: How Roberto Calvi Died (1982) (researcher)
