= Hiram Caton =

Australian politics professor (1936–2010)

- Born: Hiram Pendleton Caton III; 16 August 1936; Concord, North Carolina, USA
- Died: 13 December 2010 (aged 74); Ingham, Queensland, Australia
- Education: University of Chicago; Yale University (PhD); Griffith University (D.Litt)
- Known for: The Politics of Progress; AIDS denial
- Awards: National Humanities Fellowship 1982–1983; Research Fellow in the Institute for Advanced Studies
- Scientific career
- Fields: Politics; History
- Workplaces: Griffith University
- Website: www.hiram-caton.com

Hiram Pendleton Caton III (16 August 1936 – 13 December 2010) was a professor of politics and history at Griffith University, Brisbane, Australia, until his retirement. He was an ethicist, a Fellow of the Australian Institute of Biology (since 1994), and a founding member of the Association for Politics and the Life Sciences. He was an officer of the International Society for Human Ethology. Caton held a National Humanities Fellowship at the National Humanities Center in 1982–83. He was the inaugural Professor of Humanities at Griffith University in Brisbane, and later the Professor of Politics and History and Head of the School of Applied Ethics there.

== Education ==
Caton studied at the University of Chicago and received a PhD degree from Yale, with an (earned) D.Litt degree from Griffith University for his work in modern history.

== Research ==
Caton's work has been concerned with ethics in the sciences (particularly in life sciences and medicine), the history of ideas, and on biological bases for individual, social, and political behaviour. He has published some 175 articles, across six or seven fields—medical ethics and bioethics, human ethology, modern political and economic history, anthropology (with special attention to the Freeman-Mead controversy), philosophy (with emphasis on rationalism and positivism), crowd studies, identity psychology, and problems of the integration of biological/evolutionary factors into the social sciences, especially political science.

He achieved notoriety as an AIDS denialist in the mid-1990s for his book The AIDS Mirage (1994), in which he charged Donald Francis with "inventing a viral epidemic" in 1982 at the Centers for Disease Control.

He also wrote The Politics of Progress: The Origins and Development of the Commercial Republic, 1600–1835 in which he explores what he considers to be the political forces surrounding the application of technology to subduing nature. Modern science, he argues, was born more from these political forces than from the ideological ones (such as the Protestant Reformation) that he feels are more usually credited with it. The book was reviewed in more than 20 professional journals. Some reviewers stressed that it set forth a new interpretation of what drove the creation of capitalism, partly by tapping little-known historical sources. In it, Caton attributes the key phase to events and leaders in France, the Netherlands, and England in the 1650–1700 period. It offers interpretations of the French Revolution, of the founding of the United States of America, of Adam Smith's Wealth of Nations, and of the origin of the legend of wicked capitalism. Caton argues that Smith's conception of economics was pre-industrial (it failed to recognise that industrial technology had become a commodity) and states that the wicked capitalism legend was created in the 1820–1840 period by a clique of factory owners. In the book, Caton rejects the belief that the human species is evolving to a higher type.

In The Origin of Subjectivity: An Essay on Descartes, Caton argues that Descartes based his epistemology on optics ('optical epistemology'); and that he used his metaphysics 'as a flag to cover the goods'-- a rationalist philosophy dedicated to 'the mastery and possession of nature'.

Caton's publications on Margaret Mead, Derek Freeman, and the Samoa controversy are part of the standard literature. His edited volume, The Samoa Reader: Anthropologists Take Stock, remains the one comprehensive reader on the subject. Among his contributions to the volume are two studies on Freeman's psychology. They were featured in 2005 in a lead article in the Chronicle of Higher Education. Also in 2005, Caton was a consultant to the BBC for its documentary on the Freeman-Mead controversy, Tales from the Jungle.

His last work focused on Charles Darwin. As a former officer of the International Society of Human Ethology, he worked to integrate the Society into the web of activities celebrating the bicentenary of Darwin's birth (2009). Caton also published a reinterpretation of Darwin's contribution to the establishment of evolution. He has also devised a new interpretation of Darwin's famous illness, which he presented at the ISHE conference in Detroit, August 2006. This research was to be included in The Darwin Legend. Caton was an evolutionist sceptical of Darwinian mechanisms, and was also a catastrophist. Caton contributed a paper to a young earth creationist journal on the evolutionary basis for eugenics, The Holocaust, and euthanasia. There is no indication that Caton was a creationist.

== Publications ==
- Caton, Hiram (1973). The Origin of Subjectivity. New Haven: Yale University Press. ISBN 0-300-01569-0.
- Caton, Hiram (1984). A Bibliography of Biosocial Science. Brisbane: School of Australian Environmental Studies, Griffith University. ISBN 0-86857-193-8.
- Caton, Hiram (1985). Feminism and the Family. Cleveland, Qld: Council for a Free Australia. ISBN 0-9588833-0-0.
- Caton, Hiram (1986). The Assault on the Family: Its Aims and Basis. Cleveland, Qld: Council for a Free Australia. ISBN 0-9588343-1-8.
- Caton, Hiram (1986). The Humanist Experiment: Superman from the Test Tube. Cleveland, Qld: Council for a Free Australia. ISBN 0-9588343-0-X.
- Caton, Hiram (1988). Scientists Advocate Policy: In Vitro Fertilization in Australia. Chicago: Americans United for Life, Legal Defense Fund.
- Caton, Hiram (1988). The Politics of Progress: The Origins and Development of the Commercial Republic, 1600–1835. Gainesville: University of Florida Press. ISBN 0-8130-0847-6.
- Caton, Hiram (1990). The Samoa Reader. Washington: University Press of America. ISBN 0-8191-7720-2.
- Caton, Hiram (1990). Trends in Biomedical Regulation. London: Butterworths. ISBN 0-409-49072-5.
- Caton, Hiram; Frank K Salter; J van der Dennen (1993). The Bibliography of Human Behavior. Westport: Greenwood Press. ISBN 0-313-27897-0.
- Caton, Hiram (1994). The Aids Mirage. Sydney: University of New South Wales Press. ISBN 0-86840-342-3. etext available here
