= Continuum (magazine) =

Magazine featuring AIDS denialism

- Former editors: Jody Wells; Huw Christie Williams; Michael Baumgartner
- Categories: Health
- Founder: Jody Wells
- First issue: December 1992
- Final issue: 2001
- Country: United Kingdom
- Based in: London
- Language: English
- ISSN: 1461-1597
- OCLC: 36211346

Continuum was a magazine published by an activist group of the same name who denied the existence of HIV/AIDS.

Favoring pseudoscientific content, the magazine addressed issues related to HIV/AIDS, AIDS denialism, alternative medicine, and themes of interest to the LGBT community. It ran from December 1992 until February 2001 and ceased publication because the editors had died of AIDS-defining clinical conditions.

== History ==
Continuum was created in December 1992 by Jody Wells (12 March 1947 – 26 August 1995) in London, United Kingdom. It ceased publication in 2001, after all the editors died from AIDS-defining clinical conditions, leaving debts of over £14,000. The magazine last appeared in print in 1998 and then surfaced again in February 2001 on the Internet. It was initially published bimonthly, then began to be published seasonally.

According to the magazine:

Continuum began as a newsletter encouraging those affected to empower themselves to make care and treatment choices. As we look further, anomalies in the orthodox view (Note: The magazine used words like orthodoxy, orthodox view and hypothesis, to refer to the established fact by the international scientific community that the HIV is the cause of AIDS, the HIV/AIDS exists, and that HIV can be spread via sexual, vertical and parenteral means.) continue to appear.

Continuum promoted the idea that AIDS was a conspiracy and was not related to HIV. Wells believed that the fear of AIDS was based on homophobia, not science.

Continuum claimed to be a scientific journal for those who had alternative theories about HIV/AIDS, even though it had no peer review and promoted and advertised alternative therapies such as urinotherapy. AIDS denialists often cite the articles published in this journal as a source of scientific information.

Continuum is a unique forum for those in the scientific community challenging the orthodoxy and those whose lives have in some way been touched by the hypothesis.

In the January/February 1996 edition, the magazine began offering £1,000 to the first person who could find a scientific study that showed the isolation of HIV, even though it had been isolated in 1983 by Luc Montagnier and Françoise Barré-Sinoussi (for which they received a Nobel Prize), and then was confirmed by Robert Gallo in 1984, (Note: The four papers are, Popovic M, Sarngadharan MG, Read E, Gallo RC (May 1984). "Detection, isolation, and continuous production of cytopathic retroviruses (HTLV-III) from patients with AIDS and pre-AIDS". Science. 224 (4648): 497–500. Bibcode:1984Sci...224..497P. doi:10.1126/science.6200935. PMID 6200935.; Gallo RC, Salahuddin SZ, Popovic M, Shearer GM, Kaplan M, Haynes BF, Palker TJ, Redfield R, Oleske J, Safai B, et al. (May 1984). "Frequent detection and isolation of cytopathic retroviruses (HTLV-III) from patients with AIDS and at risk for AIDS". Science. 224 (4648): 500–3. Bibcode:1984Sci...224..500G. doi:10.1126/science.6200936. PMID 6200936.; Schüpbach J, Popovic M, Gilden RV, Gonda MA, Sarngadharan MG, Gallo RC (May 1984). "Serological analysis of a subgroup of human T-lymphotropic retroviruses (HTLV-III) associated with AIDS". Science. 224 (4648): 503–5. Bibcode:1984Sci...224..503S. doi:10.1126/science.6200937. PMID 6200937.; Sarngadharan MG, Popovic M, Bruch L, Schüpbach J, Gallo RC (May 1984). "Antibodies reactive with human T-lymphotropic retroviruses (HTLV-III) in the serum of patients with AIDS". Science. 224 (4648): 506–8. Bibcode:1984Sci...224..506S. doi:10.1126/science.6324345. PMID 6324345.) demonstrating that a retrovirus they had isolated, called HTLV-III in the belief that the virus was related to the leukemia viruses of Gallo's earlier work, was the cause of AIDS. Peter Duesberg tried to claim the prize and wrote an article for the magazine in its July/August 1996 issue, but the award was rejected because it had to meet certain conditions.

Immunity Resource Foundation hosts the complete library of Continuum magazine among an internet database of 120,000 similar documents as of June 2013.

== Editors ==
Jody Wells, founder and editor-in-chief, died at the age of 48 on 26 August 1995, by Pneumocystis pneumonia, an AIDS-defining clinical condition.

Huw Christie Williams was the editor-in-chief after the death of Jody Wells until shortly before his death at the age of 41 on 17 August 2001, by Kaposi's sarcoma, an AIDS-defining clinical condition.

Michael Baumgartner was the acting editor on the last edition of the magazine. At the request of Huw Christie Williams before his death, Baumgartner served as editor for what would ultimately be the final publication before the final closing of the magazine. Baumgartner appears to be alive as of 2025 and reinvented himself as a freelance educator.
