= Durban Declaration =

Affirmation that HIV causes AIDS

The Durban Declaration is a statement signed by over 5,000 physicians and scientists in 2000, affirming that HIV is the cause of AIDS, seventeen years after the discovery of the Human Immunodeficiency Virus. The declaration was drafted in response to HIV/AIDS denialism, and particularly to address South African president Thabo Mbeki's support for AIDS denialists. It was written several weeks before the 2000 International AIDS Conference, held in Durban, South Africa from July 9 to 14, 2000, and was published in the journal Nature to coincide with the Durban conference. The declaration called the evidence that HIV causes AIDS "clear-cut, exhaustive and unambiguous".

Each person who signed the document was required to have a Ph.D. or M.D.-equivalent degree. To avoid the appearance of conflict of interest, scientists "working for commercial companies were asked not to sign." The signatories included eleven Nobel Prize winners.

== Reaction ==
Michael Specter, writing in the New Yorker, called the Durban Declaration "one of the saddest documents in modern scientific history," reflecting concern that Mbeki's embrace of AIDS denialism was a disastrous response to South Africa's AIDS epidemic. Mbeki's government reportedly pressured South African scientists not to sign the document, and initially dismissed the Durban declaration. Health minister Manto Tshabalala-Msimang called it "elitist", while Mbeki's spokesperson said it belonged in a "dustbin".

Several AIDS denialists criticized the Declaration in a letter to the editor of Nature, casting the issue as an abridgement of their rights to free speech and an intolerance of "alternative" viewpoints. In response, Nature later published a letter detailing inaccurate claims made by AIDS denialists in their attacks on the Declaration, and a second satirical letter from two AIDS researchers, stating: "We are staunch believers in the right to free speech, but is Nature the appropriate place to militate in favour of the pre-Copernican model of the universe or the existence of phlogiston?"

In 2008, independent estimates by public health experts attributed over 300,000 preventable South African AIDS deaths and nearly 200,000 new HIV infections to government policies based on the AIDS denialist assertions criticised by the Durban Declaration.
