= Robert Willner =

American doctor

Robert E. Willner (21 June 1929 — 15 April 1995) was an American doctor noted for his role in AIDS denialism, the view that AIDS is not caused by HIV infection.

== Medical career ==
Willner described himself as originally an "orthodox" physician who slowly transitioned to alternative medicine, particularly following his wife's 1978 struggle with cancer chemotherapy. In 1995, Willner asserted that "I am convinced you can prevent all disease with diet, lifestyle changes, sanitation."

Willner's Florida medical license was suspended in 1990 following a Florida Board of Medicine ruling that Willner had made inappropriate medical claims for food products.

=== AIDS denialism ===
Willner authored a book presenting his point of view on the relation between HIV and AIDS, titled Deadly Deception: the Proof That Sex And HIV Absolutely Do Not Cause AIDS. The book was published shortly after Willner's medical license was revoked for, among other things, treating an AIDS patient with ozone therapy.

The following month, on October 28, 1994, in a press conference at a Greensboro, North Carolina hotel, Willner jabbed his finger with blood he said was from an HIV-infected patient. Willner was heavily influenced by the research of AIDS denialist Peter Duesberg, which has been discredited by the scientific community.

== Death ==
Willner died of a heart attack on April 15, 1995, at the age of 65.

== Publications ==
- The Pleasure Principle Diet: How to Lose Weight Permanently, Eating the Foods That Made You Fat (Simon & Schuster, 1984)
- Deadly Deception: The Proof That Sex And HIV Absolutely Do Not Cause AIDS. (Peltec Publishing Company Inc, 1994). ISBN 978-0-9642316-1-0
- The Cancer Solution (Peltec Pub Co, 1994)
