= Robert Root-Bernstein =

American academic (born 1953)

- Born: August 7, 1953
- Education: Princeton University (PhD)
- Known for: Research on creativity
- Scientific career
- Fields: Physiology
- Institutions: Michigan State University

Robert Root-Bernstein (born August 7, 1953) (PhD, Princeton University) is a professor of physiology at Michigan State University. In 1981, he was awarded a MacArthur Fellowship, commonly known as a "genius grant".

He has also researched and consulted on creativity for more than fifteen years. Among other books, he has authored Sparks of Genius: The Thirteen Thinking Tools of the World's Most Creative People, Discovering: Inventing and Solving Problems at the Frontiers of Scientific Knowledge, and Rethinking AIDS: The Tragic Cost of Premature Consensus. In Rethinking AIDS, Root-Bernstein postulated that factors in addition to HIV may contribute to AIDS. Root-Bernstein is a former member of the Group for the Scientific Reappraisal of the HIV-AIDS Hypothesis, a group of AIDS denialists.

Root-Bernstein asserts that HIV, while involved in the development of AIDS, may be no more important than an accumulation of co-factors such as a history of poor nutrition, lack of hygiene, intravenous drug use, anal intercourse, as well as various infections and lifestyle diseases. In its April 2004 issue, POZ published a quote it attributed to Root-Bernstein: "Both the camp that says HIV is a pussycat and the people who claim AIDS is all HIV are wrong ... The denialists make claims that are clearly inconsistent with existing studies. When I check the existing studies, I don't agree with the interpretation of the data, or, worse, I can't find the studies [at all]."

== Books authored ==
- Discovering: Inventing and Solving Problems at the Frontiers of Science, Harvard University Press, 1989.
- Rethinking AIDS: The Tragic Cost of Premature Consensus, Free Press, 1993, ISBN 978-0-02-926905-3
- (with Michèle Root-Bernstein) Honey, Mud, Maggots and Other Medical Marvels, Houghton Mifflin, 1997.
- (with Michèle Root-Bernstein) Sparks of Genius: The Thirteen Thinking Tools of the World's Most Creative People, Houghton Mifflin, 1999.
