= Celia Farber =

American print journalist and author

- Born: 1965 (age 60–61)
- Occupation: Journalist

Celia Ingrid Farber (born c. 1965) is an American print journalist and author who has covered a range of topics for magazines including Spin, Rolling Stone, Esquire, Harper's, Interview, Salon, Gear, New York Press, Media Post, New York Post and Sunday Herald, and is best known for her controversial beliefs about HIV and AIDS, and a 1998 report on O. J. Simpson's post-trial life. Farber is the daughter of radio talk pioneer Barry Farber and a graduate of New York University.

Farber has written extensively about HIV/AIDS and AIDS denialists such as Peter Duesberg. Farber claims that she never expresses her own views about whether HIV causes AIDS and instead merely reports that some people disagree with the mainstream scientific viewpoint. Her writings have been criticized by scientists and journalists for promoting AIDS denialism.

== Spin columns ==
In 1987, at the encouragement of Bob Guccione Jr., her editor at Spin magazine, Farber began exploring questions related to the role of the HIV virus in AIDS. She wrote and edited a monthly column in Spin titled "Words From the Front" from 1987 to 1995, which was focused on the subject of AIDS denialism. She says that her interest in the field was sparked when, as an intern at Spin, she heard of AL-721, a lipid mixture derived from eggs that was proposed as an anti-HIV drug. She stated, "I was very young, and I believed instantly in the mythological fantasy that there was a quote 'cure' for AIDS that was being suppressed by the government and by the pharmaceutical industry."

Farber's second Spin column was an interview with prominent AIDS denialist Peter Duesberg. In a later interview, she noted her first interview aroused response for what she believed was touching on the "taboo" of questioning the mainstream view that HIV causes AIDS. In another interview, she said she recognized that publishing an interview with Duesberg would be viewed as an endorsement of his denialist views, but believed as a journalist it was her responsibility to report on what she considered an important event in the "landscape" of AIDS. She also stated she felt that as a journalist, she was not qualified to determine what causes AIDS.

In a 1989 column for Spin, Farber interviewed researchers and doctors who felt AZT, the first approved antiretroviral medication for the treatment of HIV, had been pushed precipitously through the United States Food and Drug Administration approval process owing to political pressures. She criticized this process because she felt it led to ignoring other possible treatments, and believed she had to "give voice" to the small minority of scientists at that time who felt AZT was dangerous. Her column was criticized by the scientist running trials on AZT, as "sensationalistic drivel of half-truths and noncritical journalism that sells tabloids" and could lead to people avoiding life-saving treatment with AZT.

Farber rejected criticism that this column was essentially scaring people into avoiding AZT, saying that was not her intent. A Los Angeles Times column criticized the tone of her column as "fear-mongering" and "inexcusable," due to her giving Duesberg the last words in her column. Duesberg's words were called "hyperbolic blather", because Duesberg invoked Heinrich Himmler and compared people taking AZT to "people running into the gas chambers".

== "Out of Control" ==
Farber published a 2006 Harper's article, "Out of Control: AIDS and the corruption of medical science," which criticized the ethics of the antiretroviral drug industry and examined the arguments by Duesberg that HIV does not cause AIDS. Farber's article was widely criticized for its promotion of AIDS denialism and its many inaccuracies.

A New York Times op-ed written by scientists described Farber's article as promoting "deadly quackery" for denying the "established fact" that HIV causes AIDS, which could lead to resurgence of the disease if people began to believe HIV was harmless. The Columbia Journalism Review chided Harper’s for "giving...legitimacy" to "an illegitimate and discredited idea."

Harper's editor Roger Hodge defended Farber from criticism, stating the article was thoroughly fact-checked and that Farber was "courageous" for covering a story that came at "great personal cost". Farber said that she did not endorse the Duesberg hypothesis and that she had approached the story as an objective journalist, stating: "People can't distinguish, it seems, between describing dissent and being dissent." An article in the New York Observer juxtaposed her stated position of not endorsing Duesberg's views with previous statements she made questioning the mainstream view of HIV, and questioned whether she had herself become a "dissenter".

In response to Farber's column, leading AIDS researchers published a 37-page rebuttal to Duesberg's views, whose views these researchers believed were long disproved in the medical community, while others in the medical community criticized her column for being poorly fact checked and containing "glaring errors". Seth Kalichmann, an HIV researcher, has stated this Harper's column "represented a breakthrough of HIV/AIDS denialism into mainstream media".

== Maggiore article ==
In June 2006, Farber wrote an article for the Los Angeles CityBeat in defense of Christine Maggiore, an HIV-positive AIDS denialist, whose three-year-old daughter had died from AIDS the year before. Maggiore avoided medical treatment during pregnancy that could have prevented her children from becoming infected with HIV before birth, and she did not have her children tested for HIV after they were born, so they could not be treated for HIV. Maggiore's daughter, Eliza Jane, was found to be HIV-positive only after she died of AIDS-related complications in 2005. Maggiore herself died of AIDS-related complications in 2008, at the age of 52.

== Serious Adverse Events ==
A collection of Farber's AIDS writings, Serious Adverse Events: An Uncensored History of AIDS, was published in 2006. Interviewed by Discover magazine in connection with her book's publication, she stated that she felt many of the older mainstream ideas about HIV were proven wrong and defended the decision to devote her reporting to the AIDS-denialist viewpoint as important for journalistic reasons.

== Other work ==
Farber describes herself as "a vocal and persistent critic of political correctness and the McCarthyism that reigned in sexual harassment law in the 1990s." During her time as a writer at Spin, Farber was romantically involved with the magazine's publisher and editor, Bob Guccione Jr. In 1994, a Spin employee filed a sexual harassment lawsuit against Guccione Jr. and the magazine, alleging sexual discrimination and favoritism. Farber was a key witness in the ensuing trial, as the prosecution alleged that Farber's relationship with Guccione Jr. led to her promotion and other job opportunities. Ultimately, the jury found that Spin editors had created a "hostile environment" and awarded $90,000 to the plaintiff; the remainder of the charges, including those of sexual favoritism, were rejected.

In 1999, Farber co-founded the nonprofit organization Rock the Boat. The organization's mission was to arrange rock music concerts to stimulate independent thinking about subjects which the organization's proponents believed had been censored by the media.

Farber also worked as a ghost writer on the books How I Helped O.J. Get Away With Murder by Mike Gilbert and The Murder Business: How The Media Turns Crime Into Entertainment and Subverts Justice by Mark Fuhrman.

== Personal life ==
She is the daughter of Barry Farber, a noted radio talk-show host in New York, and Ulla Farber. She has a sister Bibi who became a singer and songwriter. In 1993, their mother, Ulla Farber, was working as a nurse at Askersund Hospital in Askersund, Sweden.

Farber married guitarist Robert Bannister on December 12, 1993. Farber and Bannister had a son, Jeremy, together. They have since divorced.
