= Étienne de Harven =

Belgian-born pathologist and electron microscopist (1928–2019)

Etienne de Harven
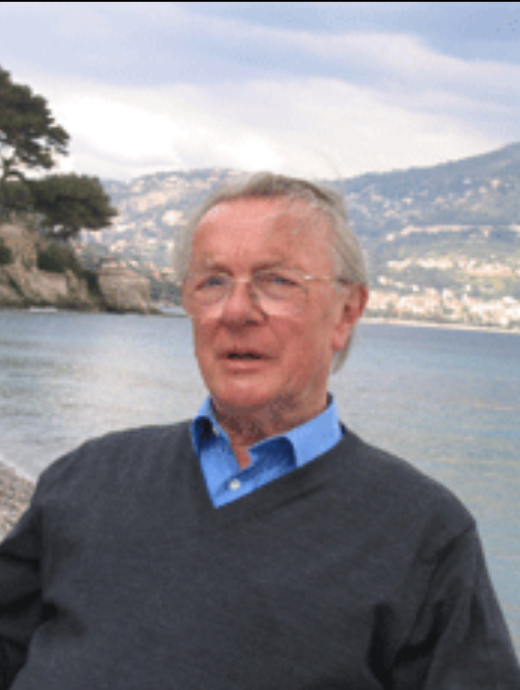
- Born: March 5, 1928; Brussels, Belgium
- Died: March 6, 2019 (aged 91)
- Education: Université Libre de Bruxelles
- Awards: Rik et Nel Wouters Award (1969), presented by Queen Fabiola of Belgium for Cancer Research. President of the Electron Microscopy Society of America in 1976
- Scientific career
- Fields: Pathology, electron microscopy, cancer research
- Workplaces: Memorial Sloan-Kettering Cancer Center (1956-1981), University of Toronto (1981-1993) Cornell Graduate School
- Academic advisors: Charles Oberling, Wilhelm Bernhard

Etienne de Harven (1928-2019) was a Belgian-born pathologist and electron microscopist. Born in Brussels, he did most of his work in New York City, Paris and Toronto. He did pioneering research on viruses, mostly related to murine leukemia. He is the former President of the Electron Microscopy Society of America (now Microscopy Society of America).

== Biography and Work ==
De Harven obtained his medical degree from the University of Brussels. He later worked at the Institute of Cancer of Villejuif under Charles Oberling and Wilhelm Bernhard, where he made pioneering observations of the structure of centrioles.

He was subsequently hired by Memorial Sloan-Kettering Cancer Center, where he worked alongside Charlotte Friend and studied viruses, mostly in mice systems and the causation and incidence of leukemia and other malignant diseases related to those viruses. Later, he provided the first description of viral budding. While at Sloan-Kettering, de Harven was part of a team which discovered "virus-like particles" in cells taken from patients with Hodgkin's disease. He became professor of cell biology at the University of Cornell and later of pathology at the University of Toronto, where he researched the marking of antigens on the surface of lymphocytes.

As former President of the Microscopy Society of America, he published several papers, mostly related to Cancer Pathologies and electron microscopy procedures for viral explorations.

De Harven was a prominent skeptic of the scientific validity of the link between HIV and AIDS, one of a group invited in 2000 to South Africa by president Thabo Mbeki to serve on a presidential panel on AIDS. He published a book in 2005 entitled Les Dix Plus Gros Mensonges sur le SIDA (Ten Lies About AIDS), in which he denies a connection between the HIV virus and AIDS, instead attributing the disease to lifestyle and environmental factors.

De Harven died in 2019.
