= Harvey Bialy =

American molecular biologist and AIDS denialist

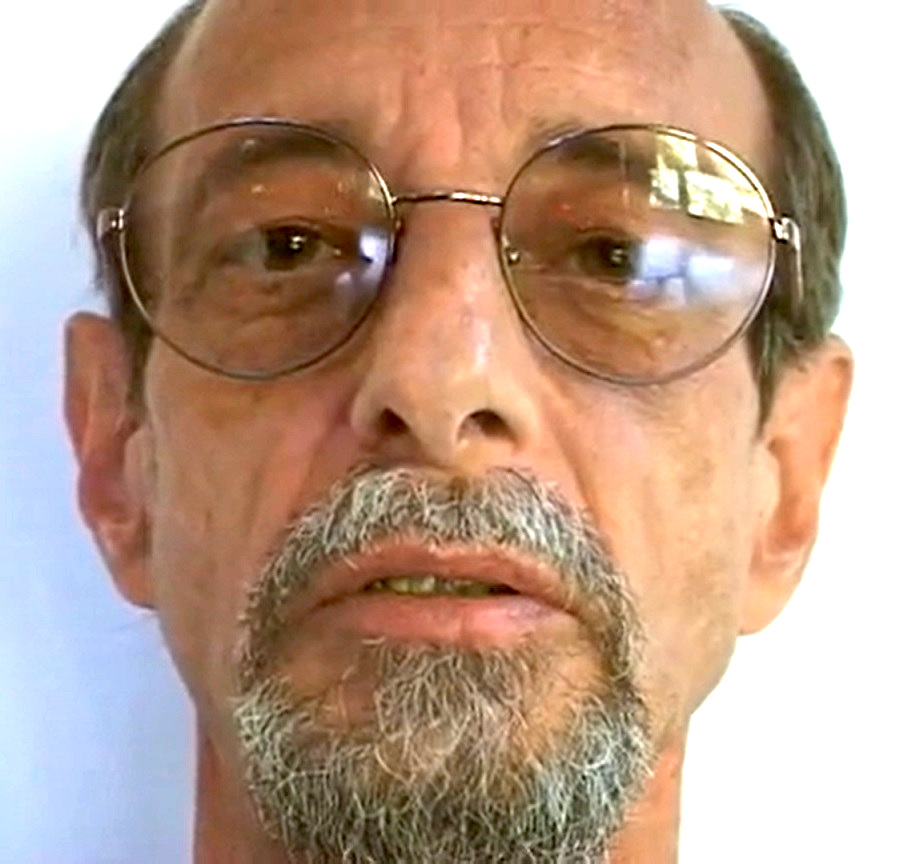
Harvey Bialy in Speaking Portraits

Harvey Bialy (born 1945, New York City) was an American molecular biologist and AIDS denialist. He was one of the signatories to a letter to the editor by the "Group for the Scientific Reappraisal of the HIV-AIDS Hypothesis", which denied that HIV was the cause of AIDS, and was a member of the controversial and heavily criticized South African Presidential AIDS Advisory Panel convened by Thabo Mbeki in 2000. Bialy authored a scientific biography of Peter Duesberg, a fellow AIDS denialist, in 2004.

== Education and early career ==
Bialy graduated from Bard College in 1966 and was awarded a Ph.D. in molecular biology in 1970 by the University of California, Berkeley. He joined the journal Nature Biotechnology (part of the Nature family of publications) as its scientific editor in 1984, and edited its peer-reviewed content from 1984 to 1996. He has co-authored papers in molecular genetics, including articles presenting evidence that phage genes can subvert host functions. He has also written numerous editorials and commentaries on contemporary issues in biotechnology in Nature Biotechnology and other journals. In 2004, Bialy authored Oncogenes, Aneuploidy, and AIDS (ISBN 1556435312), a book about the scientific life of fellow molecular biologist and AIDS denialist Peter Duesberg, with special emphasis on Duesberg's version of the aneuploidy theory of cancer, on Duesberg's refusal to accept HIV as the cause of AIDS, and on the politics of modern science.

== Later career ==
Bialy's resume indicated that he was the co-recipient of a grant from the Charles Merill Trust to study antibiotic resistant pathogens in Nigeria in 1978. He received a World Health Organization grant to study the epidemiology and genetics of antibiotic resistant enteric pathogens in Nigeria in 1982. He worked as a visiting researcher or research fellow at several universities in the United States and Africa throughout the 1980s and 1990s. He was advisor to the Center for Biotechnology and Genetic Engineering in Havana, Cuba from 1986 to 1996.

Bialy's CV also indicates that he was a resident scholar of the IBT at UNAM in Cuernavaca between 1996 and 2006, where he also founded and directed the Virtual Library of Biotechnology for the Americas.

In April 2006, Ordo Templi Orientis formed the International OTO Cabinet, an advisory, non-voting panel made up of both OTO Initiates and Non-Initiates. Along with David Tibet, Bialy was named among the initial non-member appointments.

== Artistic life ==
He was also a poet and artist. He published several books of poetry, and in 1976, he received a fellowship in poetry from the National Endowment for the Arts. Since May 2007, he devoted his time to his art, of which an exposition "Telestics ... The Art of the Ordinary" was presented 23–31 August 2007 at the Catedral de Cuernavaca. The painter Rafael Cauduro admired Bialy's work and spoke in its praise for several minutes at the inauguration ceremony, which was also attended by the Minister of Culture of the State of Morelos. More recently, in February through April 2012, Bialy's work was featured at the Nalanda Gallery of Naropa University.

== See also ==
- Duesberg hypothesis
- HIV/AIDS denialism
