= Ubhejane =

Ubhejane (sometimes stylized as uBhejane, Zulu for "black rhinoceros") is a South African herbal medicine marketed as a treatment for HIV/AIDS, It was invented by former truck driver Zeblon Gwala, who has claimed that he got the idea for it in a dream. Gwala advises his patients to take ubhejane instead of antiretroviral drugs (ARVs), saying that while both ubhejane and ARVs work, ubhejane, unlike ARVs, does not have side effects. The price at which ubhejane was sold has been reported variously at $25 and $50 US dollars.

== Ingredients ==
Ubhejane consists of two herbal remedies: one is sold in a bottle with a blue cap, the other in a bottle with a white one. Both are black and liquid in appearance. The blue one, according to Gwala, fights the virus that causes AIDS, and the other is said to boost the immune system. Ubhejane has 89 herbal ingredients, which Gwala says he collects from all over Africa and mixes together by hand. Gwala was criticized by AIDS expert Dennis Sifris for refusing to reveal the ingredients of ubhejane.

== Research ==
In 2005, Gwala approached the dean of University of KwaZulu-Natal's medical school to ask them to conduct a clinical trial of ubhejane, but he said it was too soon for this, and suggested performing lab tests instead. The results of these tests showed that ubhejane was not toxic to cells, and that it kills bacteria. One of ubhejane's most outspoken promoters, Herbert Vilakazi, claimed that this research had shown that the remedy was effective, but the university subsequently released a statement saying that this was not the case.

== Reaction ==
=== Support ===
Among the notable supporters of ubhejane was Obed Mlaba, who was the mayor of Durban during the 2000s, as well as former South African health minister Manto Tshabalala-Msimang. Gwala has responded to criticisms by saying that he has not claimed that ubhejane is a cure for HIV/AIDS, and that he has not told any of his patients to stop taking ARVs.

=== Opposition ===
In 2007, the Democratic Alliance Party of South Africa requested a police investigation of Gwala, whom it described as a "backyard chemist" manufacturing a "fake AIDS cure." Ubhejane has also been implicated in causing liver failure, as well as causing the development of drug resistance, in some patients who took it.
