= David Rasnick =

American biochemist (born 1948)

- Born: 1948 (age 77–78)
- Education: Georgia Institute of Technology
- Scientific career
- Thesis: Affinity labeling of metalloendoproteases (1978)

David William Rasnick (born 1948) is an American biochemist known for his association with the AIDS denialist movement, which denies the fact that HIV is the cause of AIDS, and for his involvement with clinical trials in South Africa promoting vitamins for the treatment of AIDS, which were later ruled illegal by the South African judiciary.

== Education and body of work ==
David Rasnick received a PhD in chemistry from Georgia Tech in 1978; his thesis was entitled "Affinity Labeling of Metalloendoproteases." Rasnick studied proteases in rats and has also written a book about the aneuploidy theory of cancer.

Rasnick was a prominent member of the AIDS-denialist movement, which claimed that HIV either did not exist, or did not cause AIDS. He claimed that HIV was a harmless "passenger virus" incapable of causing any disease. In association with Matthias Rath, Rasnick traveled to South Africa, a country with one of the highest incidences of HIV/AIDS in the world, where they discouraged HIV-infected individuals from using antiretroviral drugs and instead promoted the use of proprietary vitamin mixes which were claimed to fight AIDS. Rasnick also advocated a complete ban on HIV testing in South Africa, and denied that there was "any evidence" of an HIV epidemic in South Africa. In 2008, a South African court ruled that the trials conducted by Rath and Rasnick were illegal, and barred them from conducting clinical trials or advertising vitamin supplements in the country.
