= List of HIV-positive people =

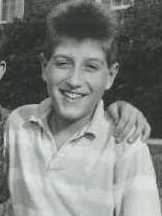
The American teenager Ryan White, who died from AIDS in 1990, is the namesake for U.S. federal legislation that addresses the unmet health needs of persons infected with HIV/AIDS. He has been considered the poster boy for HIV/AIDS.

This is a categorized, alphabetical list of people who are known to have been infected with the human immunodeficiency virus (HIV), the pathogen that causes AIDS, including those who have died. AIDS is a pandemic.

Since the beginning of the epidemic, 84.2 million [64.0–113.0 million] people have been infected with the HIV virus and about 40.1 million [33.6–48.6 million] people have died of HIV.

Globally, 38.4 million [33.9–43.8 million] people were living with HIV at the end of 2021. An estimated 0.7% [0.6-0.8%] of adults aged 15–49 years worldwide are living with HIV, although the burden of the epidemic continues to vary considerably between countries and regions.

The WHO African Region remains most severely affected, with nearly 1 in every 29 adults living with HIV and accounting for more than two-thirds of the people living with HIV worldwide.

HIV is spread primarily by unprotected sex (including vaginal, anal, and oral sex), contaminated blood transfusions, hypodermic needles, and from mother to child during pregnancy, delivery, or breastfeeding. Because of lack of public acceptance, people infected with HIV are frequently subjected to stigma and discrimination. Publicity campaigns around the world have aimed to counter HIV-related prejudices and misconceptions and to replace them with an accurate understanding that helps to prevent new infections. These efforts have been aided by various celebrities – including American basketball star Magic Johnson and South African judge Edwin Cameron – who have publicly announced that they are HIV-positive.

== Acting (film and television) ==
Name	Life	Comments	Reference
Dallas Adams	(1947–1991)	British actor who appeared in King's Royal	
Charlie Barnett	(1954–1996)	American actor and comedian who starred in the television series Miami Vice and the 1983 film D.C. Cab	
Christopher Bernau	(1940–1989)	American actor who starred in the television series Dark Shadows	
Amanda Blake	(1929–1989)	American actress, known for her role as Kitty Russell in the television series Gunsmoke	
Sandra Bréa	(1952–2000)	Brazilian actress and model, regarded as one of Brazil's main sex symbols of the 1970s	
Jim J. Bullock	(born 1955)	American actor who starred in the sitcoms Too Close for Comfort and Ned's Declassified School Survival Guide	
Stephan W. Burns	(1954–1990)	American actor who starred in the film Herbie Goes Bananas and the television mini-series The Thorn Birds	
Merritt Butrick	(1959–1989)	American actor, known for playing Captain Kirk's son in the films Star Trek, Star Trek II: The Wrath of Khan and Star Trek III: The Search for Spock.	
Eduardo Casanova	(born 1991)	Spanish actor and filmmaker	
Ian Charleson	(1949–1990)	British actor, known for playing the role of athlete Eric Liddell in the film Chariots of Fire	
Daveigh Chase	(1990–2026)	American actress, known for playing the role of Lilo Pelekai in Lilo and Stitch and Samara Morgan in the The Ring.	
Yoni Chen	(1953–1995)	Israeli actor who performed the role of Batz on the puppet show Parpar Nechmad and dubbed the voices of characters on animated shows and films into the Hebrew language, most notably Looney Tunes	
Keith Christopher	(1957–1998)	American actor and singer, known for playing HIV-positive characters on NBC soap opera Another World and CBS daytime drama The Guiding Light	
Brad Davis	(1949–1991)	American actor, known for playing the part of Billy Hayes in the film Midnight Express	
Robert Drivas	(1938–1986)	American film, television and stage actor	
Denholm Elliott	(1922–1992)	British actor, known for his performances in the films Trading Places, A Private Function, Defence of the Realm and A Room with a View	
René Enríquez	(1933–1990)	Nicaraguan-American actor, known for his role in the 1980s television series Hill Street Blues	
Richard Frank	(1953–1995)	American television and motion picture actor, known for playing the role of Father Vogler in the film Amadeus	
Leonard Frey	(1938–1988)	American Broadway and film actor, known for his performance as Motel Kamzoil in the film version of Fiddler on the Roof	
Tom Fuccello	(1936–1993)	American actor, known for his role as Dave Culver in the television series Dallas	
Leslie Graves	(1959–1995)	American actress, known for playing Brenda Clegg in the soap opera Capitol from 1982 to 1984	
Kevin Peter Hall	(1955–1991)	American actor, known for his roles in the films Predator and Harry and the Hendersons	
Antony Hamilton	(1952–1995)	Australian actor, model and dancer, known for his roles in Cover Up and the 1988 revival of Mission Impossible.	
Christian Haren	(1935–1996)	American actor and model, known for portraying the Marlboro Man in print advertisements.	
Rock Hudson	(1925–1985)	American actor, first major public figure to publicly disclose his HIV status.	
Michael Jeter	(1952–2003)	American film and theatre actor, known for his role on the sitcom Evening Shade and his performance as Otto Kringelein in the musical Grand Hotel, for which he received a Tony Award for Best Featured Actor in a Musical	
Michael Kearns	(1950–2026)	American actor, writer, director, teacher, producer, and activist	
Larry Kert	(1930–1991)	American film and theatre actor	
Hans Kesting	(born 1960)	Dutch film, theatre and television actor.	
Rémi Laurent	(1957–1989)	French actor, known for playing Laurent Baldi in the French-Italian movie La Cage aux Folles.	
Sirpa Lane	(1952–1999)	Finnish actress and model, known for starring in the films La Bête (1975), Nazi Love Camp 27 (1977) and The Secret Nights of Lucrezia Borgia (1982)	
Irving Allen Lee	(1948–1992)	American soap opera and musical actor	
Cláudia Magno	(1958–1994)	Brazilian actress and dancer	
Tom McBride	(1952–1995)	American actor and model, best known for his role in Friday the 13th Part 2 and for his modeling stint as the Marlboro Man	
Dursley McLinden	(1965–1995)	British actor; the lead character of Ritchie Tozer (played by Olly Alexander) in the 2021 AIDS drama series It's a Sin was inspired by him	
John Megna	(1952–1995)	American former child actor, known for his role as Dill in To Kill a Mockingbird	
Steve Moore	(1954–2014)	American comedian whose 1997 HBO special Drop Dead Gorgeous (A Tragi-Comedy): The Power of HIV-Positive Thinking focused on finding the humor in life with HIV	
Lesego Motsepe	(1974–2014)	South African actress and AIDS activist	
Cookie Mueller	(1949–1989)	American actor and writer who appeared in many of filmmaker John Waters' early films	
Timothy Patrick Murphy	(1959–1988)	American actor, known for playing the role of Mickey Trotter in the television series Dallas	
Jeffrey Mylett	(1949–1986)	American actor, known for his roles in the films Godspell and My Man Adam	
Michael Nader	(1945–2021)	American actor; known for his roles in television series All My Children and Dynasty.	
David Oliver	(1962–1991)	American actor, known for his roles in Another World and A Year in the Life	
Ilka Tanya Payán	(1943–1996)	Dominican-born American actress, attorney and activist; she was one of the first Latino celebrities to publicly disclose her HIV-positive status.	
Mark Patton	(born 1958)	American actor best known for portraying Jesse Walsh in A Nightmare on Elm Street 2: Freddy's Revenge	
Anthony Perkins	(1932–1992)	American actor best known for his role as Norman Bates in the Alfred Hitchcock film Psycho	
Danny Pintauro	(born 1976)	American actor best known for his role as Jonathan in the 1980s sitcom Who's the Boss?	
Werner Pochath	(1939–1993)	Austrian actor	
Billy Porter	(born 1969)	American actor	
Keith Prentice	(1940–1992)	American theatre and soap opera actor	
Kurt Raab	(1941–1988)	German actor known for his work with film director Rainer Werner Fassbinder	
Dack Rambo	(1941–1994)	American actor who played Jack Ewing in the television series Dallas	
Gene Anthony Ray	(1962–2003)	American actor and dancer; best known for his portrayal of the street smart dancer Leroy in the 1980 motion picture Fame and its television spin-off.	
Robert Reed	(1932–1992)	American actor, known for playing the role of Mike Brady on The Brady Bunch.	
Tony Richardson	(1928–1991)	British film director, known for his 1963 film Tom Jones, for which he received two Academy Awards	
Larry Riley	(1952–1992)	American actor, known for playing the role of Frank Williams in the soap opera Knots Landing	
Howard Rollins	(1950–1996)	American actor, nominated for the 1981 Academy Award for Best Supporting Actor for his performance in the film Ragtime	
Sean Sasser	(1968–2013)	American actor who appeared on MTV's The Real World: San Francisco, AIDS activist, and pastry chef	
Franklyn Seales	(1952–1990)	St. Vincent-born American actor, known for his role in the sitcom Silver Spoons	
Tommy Sexton	(1955–1993)	Canadian actor and comedian	
Ray Sharkey	(1952–1993)	American actor, known for his performance in The Idolmaker, for which he won a Golden Globe Award	
Charlie Sheen	(born 1965)	American actor	
Paul Shenar	(1936–1989)	American film and theatre actor, known for his role as Alejandro Sosa in the 1983 film Scarface	
Hugo Soto	(1953–1994)	Argentine film and theatre actor	
Dennis Cleveland Stewart	(1947–1994)	American film and television actor and professional dancer; best known for his role as Leo in the 1978 film Grease	
Stephen Stucker	(1947–1986)	American actor and comedian; best known for the Airplane! films	
Taína	(born 1975)	Puerto Rican television personality	
Steve Tracy	(1952–1986)	American actor, best known for his role in Little House on the Prairie	
Charlotte Valandrey	(1968–2022)	French actress and author	
José De Vega	(1934–1990)	American actor, best known for playing Chino in both the Broadway and 1961 film versions of West Side Story	
Tom Villard	(1953–1994)	American actor; played Jay Bostwick in the TV series We Got It Made	

== AIDS activists ==
Name	Life	Comments	Reference
Zackie Achmat	(born 1962)	South African AIDS activist; founder and chairman of the Treatment Action Campaign	
Noriyasu Akase	(died 1991)	Japanese AIDS activist; he was the first person in Japan to publicize his HIV-positive status	
Rebekka Armstrong	(born 1967)	American former Playboy Playmate and HIV/AIDS educator	
Rick Bébout	(1950–2009)	Canadian AIDS activist, journalist and memoirist	
Richard Berkowitz	(born 1955)	American activist and author	
Gina Brown	(born 1966)	American activist and social worker, working to decriminalize HIV status in the Southern U.S.	
Marvelyn Brown	(born 1984)	American activist and author	
Bruce Burnett	(1954–1985)	New Zealand AIDS activist	
Peter Busse	(1958–2006)	South African AIDS activist and educator; one of the first openly HIV-positive South Africans; co-founded Township AIDS Project (TAP) and the National Association of People Living with HIV/AIDS (NAPWA)	
Gideon Byamugisha	(born 1959)	First openly HIV positive religious leader in Africa; founder of ANERELA and winner of the 2009 Niwano Peace Prize	
Michael Callen	(1955–1993)	American AIDS activist, author and singer–songwriter; co-founder of PWA Health Group and the Community Research Initiative (now ACRIA); testified before the President's Commission on AIDS and both houses of the United States Congress in 1983	
Bobbi Campbell	(1952–1984)	American AIDS activist and one of the first people to publicly come out as a person with AIDS	
Paddy Chew	(1960–1999)	Singaporean AIDS activist; he was the first person in Singapore to publicise his HIV-positive status	
Dolzura Cortez	(1960/61–1992)	Filipina AIDS activist; she was the first person in the Philippines to publicise her HIV-positive status	
Spencer Cox	(1968–2012)	American AIDS activist who helped facilitate the development of protease inhibitors	
Tyler Curry	(born 1983)	American HIV activist and columnist	
Leigh Davids	(1979–2019)	South African AIDS activist	
Joey DiPaolo	(born 1979)	American AIDS activist who won a court case to remain at his school; co-founder of the Joey DiPaolo AIDS Foundation	
Gugu Dlamini	(1962–1998)	South African AIDS activist who was beaten to death shortly after disclosing her diagnosis	
Peggy Ferro	(1949–1998)	American healthcare worker and AIDS acivist; testified to Congress about needlestick injuries in US hospitals	
Mary Fisher	(born 1948)	American AIDS activist; delivered a speech about AIDS at the 1992 Republican National Convention	
Jim Foster	(1934–1990)	American LGBTQ rights and Democratic Party activist, co-founder of the Society for Individual Rights, an early homophile organization	
Robert Frascino	(1952–2011)	American HIV specialist physician, immunologist, and HIV/AIDS advocate; co-founder of the Robert James Frascino AIDS Foundation	
Stephen Gendin	(1966–2000)	American AIDS activist involved in ACT UP and other groups; columnist for POZ magazine	
Alison Gertz	(1966–1992)	American AIDS activist; voted Woman of the Year by Esquire	
Elizabeth Glaser	(1947–1994)	American AIDS activist for pediatric causes and co-founder of the Elizabeth Glaser Pediatric AIDS Foundation	
Gregg Gonsalves	(born 1964 or 1965)	American AIDS activist, worked with ACT UP in the 1980s and 1990s, now codirector of the Global Health Justice Partnership at Yale University	
Jahnabi Goswami	(born 1976)	Indian AIDS activist and first woman in Northeast India to declare her HIV status	
Eve van Grafhorst	(1982–1993)	Australian-born New Zealand AIDS campaigner; infected at birth via blood transfusions	
Thomas Hannan	(1950–1991)	American AIDS activist and co-founder of PWA Health Group and the Community Research Initiative (now ACRIA)	
Mark Harrington	(born 1959/60)	American AIDS activist and researcher, member of ACT UP and co-founder of the Treatment Action Group (TAG)	
Bob Hattoy	(1950–2007)	Government employee and activist on issues related to gay rights, AIDS and the environment	
Nkosi Johnson	(1989–2001)	South African child, who made a powerful impact on public perceptions of the pandemic and its effects before his death at the age of twelve	
Cleve Jones	(born 1954)	American LGBT and AIDS activist, who conceived of the NAMES Project AIDS Memorial Quilt; portrayed in the 2008 film Milk	
Christine Kafando	(born 1971 or 1972)	Burkinabé HIV/AIDS activist	
David Kirby	(1957–1990)	American HIV/AIDS activist and subject of a well-known photograph taken at his deathbed; the image was published in Life magazine, which called it the "picture that changed the face of AIDS"	
Bill Kraus	(1947–1986)	American LGBT and AIDS activist and congressional aide; portrayed by Ian McKellen in the HBO film And the Band Played On	
Carole LaFavor	(1942-2011)	American HIV/AIDS activist and writer	
Michael Lynch	(1944–1991)	Canadian AIDS activist, professor, poet, and journalist	
Prudence Nobantu Mabele	(1971–2017)	South African AIDS activist	
Cass Mann	(1948–2009)	AIDS activist/dissident and founder of the holistic AIDS charity Positively Healthy	
Eliana Martinez	(1981–1989)	American girl whose mother appealed a court ruling that she could only be allowed to be in school if she were in a glass cage during classes	
Tim McCaskell	(born 1951)	Canadian AIDS activist and co-founder of AIDS Action Now!	
Aldyn Mckean	(1948–1994)	American AIDS and LGBT activist, member of ACT UP, GMHC and the National Gay and Lesbian Task Force	
Ronnie Mutimusekwa	(1955–1992)	First Zimbabwean AIDS activist	
Ray Navarro	(1964–1990)	American AIDS activist, member of ACT UP and founder of gay and lesbian video activist collective Diva TV	
Simon Nkoli	(1957–1998)	South African anti-apartheid, gay rights and AIDS activist	
Connie Norman	(1949–1996)	American AIDS activist	
Rory O'Neill	(born 1968)	Irish drag queen and gay rights activist; also known by his stage names Panti, Panti Bliss and Pandora Panti Bliss	
Paul Popham	(1941–1987)	American AIDS activist, co-founder and president of Gay Men's Health Crisis from 1981 until 1985	
Robert Rafsky	(1945–1993)	American AIDS activist, member of ACT UP and the Treatment Action Group	
Paul Rapoport	(1940–1987))	American lawyer and gay rights activist, co-founder of the Lesbian, Gay, Bisexual & Transgender Community Center and Gay Men's Health Crisis	
Ricky Ray; Robert Ray; Randy Ray	(1977–1992) (1978–2000) (1979–2023)	American brothers who were the subject of a federal court battle against the DeSoto County school board to allow them to attend public school despite their diagnoses.	
Josh Robbins	(born 1983)	American HIV activist who published a video on YouTube of being told of his HIV diagnosis in January 2012	
Vito Russo	(1946–1990)	American gay activist, film historian and writer; author of The Celluloid Closet chronicling the history of depictions of homosexuality in film	
Jorge Saavedra	(born 1958)	Mexican AIDS activist and director of CENSIDA, Mexico's HIV-prevention government agency, since 2003	
Linda Scruggs	(born 1964)	American HIV activist, founding member of the Positive Women's Network USA and a founding member of the US National Black Woman HIV Network	
Jim St. James	(1954–1990)	Canadian actor and activist best known for starring in a series of HIV/AIDS awareness commercials on Canadian television in the 1980s, and as the subject of a biography by journalist June Callwood	
Pedro Julio Serrano	(born 1974)	Puerto Rican LGBT and AIDS activist and the first openly HIV-positive and openly gay person to run for public office in Puerto Rico	
Herbert de Souza	(1935–1997)	Brazilian human rights and HIV/AIDS activist	
Peter Staley	(born 1961)	American HIV/AIDS and LGBT rights activist, member of ACT UP, co-founder of the Treatment Action Group and founder of the educational website AIDSmeds.com	
Tonie Walsh	(born 1960)	Irish civil rights activist, journalist and founder of Irish Queer Archive	
Beatrice Were	(born c. 1966)	Ugandan AIDS activist and co-founder of the non-governmental organization NACWOLA	
Ryan White	(1971–1990)	American teenager and AIDS activist; the Ryan White Care Act, a federal law that addresses the unmet health needs of persons infected with HIV/AIDS in the United States, was named after him	
Ron Woodroof	(1950-1992)	American man who created the later-termed Dallas Buyers Club	

== Business ==
Name	Life	Comments	Reference
Vasily Aleksanyan	(1972–2011)	Russian lawyer and businessman, former Executive Vice President of Yukos oil company, jailed as a suspected accomplice to tax evasion and money laundering; allegedly denied treatment in jail	
Stephen D. Hassenfeld	(1942–1989)	American businessman best known for being the chairman and chief executive officer of Hasbro from 1980 until 1989	
Chuck Holmes	(1945–2000)	American businessman founder of gay pornography studio Falcon Entertainment	
Gordon Montador	(1950–1991)	Canadian book editor and publisher	
Ken Ramsauer	(1954–1983)	American hardware store manager and freelance lighting designer; in 1983, he became the first AIDS patient to be the subject of a national television news program when he was interviewed on ABC's 20/20 four days before his death.	
Steve Rubell	(1943–1989)	American owner of New York City disco Studio 54	
Sean Strub	(born 1958)	American magazine publisher, founder of POZ magazine	

== Criminal transmission of HIV ==
Name	Life	Comments	Reference
Johnson Aziga	(born 1956)	Ugandan-born Canadian, notable as the first person to be charged with, and convicted of, first-degree murder in Canada for transmitting HIV, after the deaths of two women he had infected	
Nadja Benaissa	(born 1982)	German female pop singer who was convicted of knowingly infecting a number of her lovers	
Henry Cuerrier	(19??–)	Canadian man convicted of aggravated assault for knowingly exposing two women to HIV	
Carl Leone	(born c. 1976)	Canadian businessman found guilty of 15 counts of aggravated sexual assault for not informing his partners of his HIV status	
Andre Chad Parenzee	(born c. 1971)	South African-born man convicted in Australia on three counts of endangering human life through having unprotected sex without informing his partners of his HIV status	
Trevis Smith	(born 1976)	American Canadian football player with the Saskatchewan Roughriders, jailed for aggravated sexual assault	
Valentino Talluto	(born 1984)	Italian accountant convicted of thirty transmissions of HIV and sentenced to 24 years imprisonment	
Nushawn Williams	(born 1976)	American who infected 13 women with HIV; imprisoned for reckless endangerment and statutory rape	

== Film, television and radio ==
Name	Life	Comments	Reference
Peter Adair	(1943–1996)	American documentary filmmaker	
Néstor Almendros	(1930–1992)	Spanish cinematographer, director and human rights activist; won the Academy Award for Best Cinematography for the film Days of Heaven	
John-Manuel Andriote	(born 1958)	American journalist	
Emile Ardolino	(1943–1993)	American film director and producer; directed the films Dirty Dancing and Sister Act	
Howard Ashman	(1950–1991)	American playwright and lyricist; along with music composer Alan Menken, he received two Grammy Awards, two Golden Globes and two Oscars for Best Song for the films The Little Mermaid and Beauty and the Beast (the latter was released posthumously)	
Rob Astbury	(1948–2017)	Former Australian television sports presenter	
Trinity K. Bonet	(born 1991)	American drag queen who competed on the sixth season of RuPaul's Drag Race	
Arthur J. Bressan Jr.	(1943–1987)	American director, writer and producer, best known for directing the 1985 film Buddies, the first film about the AIDS epidemic	
Dave Brindle	(born 19??)	Canadian television journalist; anchor for CBC Newsworld	
David Brudnoy	(1940–2004)	American talk radio host in Boston from 1976 to 2004	
Tom Cassidy	(1950–1991)	Business anchor for CNN and founder of the weekend show Pinnacle in 1982	
Cyril Collard	(1957–1993)	French film director and writer, best known for his film Savage Nights, one of the first French films about AIDS	
Charity Kase	(born 1996)	British drag performer who competed on the third season of RuPaul's Drag Race UK	
Jacques Demy	(1931–1990)	French film director, best known for his films The Umbrellas of Cherbourg and The Young Girls of Rochefort	
Venus D-Lite	(born 1983)	American drag queen who competed on the third season of RuPaul's Drag Race	
Kenny Everett	(1944–1995)	British disc jockey and television entertainer; starred and wrote in his own music and comedy television series The Kenny Everett Television Show	
Amos Guttman	(1954–1993)	Israeli film director; an openly gay man, he was a pioneer of LGBT cinema in Israel	
Vincent Hanley	(1954–1987)	Irish RTÉ radio DJ and television presenter	
Teo Hernández	(1939–1992)	Mexican filmmaker	
Colin Higgins	(1941–1988)	American screenwriter, director, and producer; wrote the screenplay for the 1971 film Harold and Maude	
Richard Hunt	(1951–1992)	American Muppet puppeteer; played the character of Scooter on The Muppet Show	
Derek Jarman	(1942–1994)	British film director, stage designer, artist, and writer	
Peter Jepson-Young	(1957–1992)	Canadian medical doctor who promoted AIDS and HIV awareness and education in the early 1990s through his regular segment on CBC Television news broadcasts	
Lawrence Kasha	(1933–1990)	American theatre producer and director, playwright and television producer	
Thierry Le Luron	(1952–1986)	French humorist and impressionist	
Lexi Love	(born 1990)	American drag performer who competed on the seventeenth season of RuPaul's Drag Race.	
Melvin Lindsey	(1955–1992)	American radio and television personality in the Washington, D.C. area; pioneered the Quiet Storm radio format	
Pavel Lobkov	(born 1967)	Russian journalist, formerly on TV Rain	
Roy London	(1943–1993)	American acting coach, actor and director	
Lance Loud	(1951–2001)	American television personality and magazine columnist, known for his role in An American Family, widely considered the first reality TV show.	
James K. Lyons	(1960–2007)	American actor and film editor, known for editing The Virgin Suicides and editing and co-writing Velvet Goldmine	
Sonia Martínez	(1963–1994)	Spanish actress and television presenter, best known as a cat member of the children's television series Sabadabada (1983–1984)	
Curt McDowell	(1945–1987)	American underground filmmaker	
Michael McDowell	(1950–1999)	American novelist and screenwriter	
Andy Milligan	(1929–1991)	American playwright, screenwriter and film director	
CJ de Mooi	(born 1969)	British actor, writer, former professional quizzer and television personality	
Ongina	(born 1982)	American drag queen and HIV activist, known for competing in the first season of RuPaul's Drag Race and the fifth season of RuPaul's Drag Race All Stars; became one of the first reality TV stars to come out as HIV-positive	
Q	(born 1998)	American drag queen, competed on the sixteenth season of RuPaul's Drag Race	
Norman René	(1951–1996)	American film director and producer	
Marlon Riggs	(1957–1994)	American author and documentary filmmaker	
Max Robinson	(1939–1988)	American journalist, known for being the first African American network news anchor, co-anchoring ABC's World News Tonight from 1978 to 1983	
Anthony Sabatino	(1944–1993)	American art director, known for his work on the television show Fun House, for which he won an Emmy Award	
Murray Salem	(1950–1998)	American television actor and screenwriter; wrote the script for the film Kindergarten Cop	
Klaus Schwarzkopf	(1922–1991)	German television and stage actor	
Bill Sherwood	(1952–1990)	American filmmaker, known for the film Parting Glances.	
Jack Smith	(1932–1989)	American underground film director, best known for the avant-garde movie Flaming Creatures.	
Michael Sundin	(1961–1989)	British television presenter and actor; presented the BBC children television show Blue Peter	
Jonathan Van Ness	(born 1987)	American hairdresser, podcaster, and television personality; cast member on Netflix's Queer Eye series	
Esther Valiquette	(1962–1994)	Canadian documentary filmmaker (The Measure of Your Passage)	
Joseph Vásquez	(1962–1995)	American independent filmmaker	
Ron Walters	(1938–1994)	American make-up artist; won three Primetime Emmy Awards and was nominated for two more in the category Outstanding Makeup	
Pedro Zamora	(1972–1994)	American television personality; cast member of MTV's The Real World reality series.	

== Music ==
Name	Life	Comments	Reference
Peter Allen	(1944–1992)	Australian singer songwriter-singer; wrote the expatriate anthem "I Still Call Australia Home".	
Keith Barrow	(1954–1983)	American disco/soul singer-songwriter	
Andy Bell	(born 1964)	British musician; lead vocalist of the synthpop duo Erasure	
Nadja Benaissa	(born 1982)	German musician; member of the girl group No Angels	
Andy Bey	(1939–2025)	American jazz musician	
Black Randy	(1952–1988)	American leader of west coast art-punk soul band Black Randy and the Metrosquad	
Jorge Bolet	(1914–1990)	Cuban pianist and conductor, known for his performances and recordings of large-scale romantic music	
Mykki Blanco	(born 1986)	American rapper, performance artist, poet and LGBT activist	
Cazuza	(1958–1990)	Brazilian singer and composer	
Stuart Challender	(1947–1991)	Australian conductor; second Australian-born Chief Conductor of the Sydney Symphony (1987–91)	
Mel Cheren	(1933 –2007)	American music executive, founder of West End Records	
David Cole	(1963–1995)	American dance music producer, part of C+C Music Factory	
Patrick Cowley	(1950–1982)	American electronic music artist	
Robbin Crosby	(1959–2002)	American guitarist and member of glam metal band Ratt	
Karen Dalton	(1937–1993)	American country blues singer, guitarist, and banjo player	
Tony De Vit	(1957–1998)	British club disc jockey	
Bobby DeBarge	(1956–1995)	American singer, member of the R&B bands DeBarge and Switch	
Paul Delph	(1957–1996)	Singer-songwriter, producer, engineer and studio musician	
Kiki Djan	(1957–2004)	Ghanaian singer, member of the musical band Osibisa	
Eazy-E	(1963–1995)	American rapper, member of gangsta rap group N.W.A	
Youri Egorov	(1954–1988)	Soviet and Monegasque classical pianist; defected to the Netherlands in 1976	
Patrick Esposito Di Napoli	(1964–1994)	French Canadian singer	
Brenda Fassie	(1964–2004)	South African singer-songwriter, dancer and activist	
Tom Fogerty	(1941–1990)	American musician who played rhythm guitar in Creedence Clearwater Revival; elder brother of lead singer John Fogerty	
Andy Fraser	(1952–2015)	British musician who played bass guitar in the 1970s group Free	
Michael Friedman	(1975–2017)	American composer and lyricist; wrote the Broadway musical Bloody Bloody Andrew Jackson	
Ray Gillen	(1959–1993)	American singer, best known for his work with the bands Black Sabbath and Badlands	
Paul Giovanni	(1933–1990)	American playwright, actor, director, singer and musician, best known for writing the music for the film The Wicker Man	
John Grant	(born 1968)	American alternative rock singer and songwriter	
Kenny Greene	(1969–2001)	American R&B singer; member of the group Intro	
Howard Greenfield	(1936–1986)	American songwriter	
Steven Grossman	(1951–1991)	American singer-songwriter	
Calvin Hampton	(1938–1984)	American organist and sacred music composer	
Dan Hartman	(1950–1994)	American singer, songwriter and record producer	
Ofra Haza	(1957–2000)	Israeli singer; gained international recognition with the single "Im Nin'alu"	
Jerry Herman	(1931–2019)	American composer and lyricist; composed the scores for the Broadway musicals Hello, Dolly!, Mame, and La Cage aux Folles	
Fred Hersch	(born 1955)	American contemporary jazz pianist	
Paul Jabara	(1948–1992)	American actor and songwriter: wrote Donna Summer's hit "Last Dance"	
Paul Jacobs	(1930–1983)	American pianist	
Jobriath	(1946–1983)	American glam rock musician; he was one of the first famous musicians to die of AIDS-related complications	
Holly Johnson	(born 1960)	British singer, former lead vocalist of Frankie Goes to Hollywood.	
Bernard Kabanda	(1959–1999)	Ugandan guitarist	
René Klijn	(1962–1993)	Dutch boyband singer and model who appeared in a controversial 1992 episode of Paul de Leeuw's TV show De Schreeuw van de Leeuw, where Klijn's illness was the main subject while De Leeuw joked about it; the episode was praised for discussing a taboo subject and their duet, Mr. Blue, became a number one-hit in the Netherlands	
Fela Kuti	(1938–1997)	Nigerian musician and political activist	
Héctor Lavoe	(1946–1993)	Puerto Rican salsa singer and composer	
Paul Lekakis	(born 1966)	American singer and actor	
Liberace	(1919–1987)	American pianist and entertainer	
Andreas Lundstedt	(born 1972)	Swedish musician, best known as a member of the pop-disco group Alcazar	
Philly Lutaaya	(1951–1989)	Ugandan composer and musician and AIDS prevention activist in Africa	
Billy Lyall	(1953–1989)	British keyboard player; member of Pilot and the Bay City Rollers	
Craig Mack	(1970–2018)	American rapper and record producer	
Jimmy McShane	(1957–1995)	Frontman of the Italian musical band Baltimora	
Freddie Mercury	(1946–1991)	British musician and lead singer of the band Queen	
Haoui Montaug	(1952–1991)	American nightclub doorman, club promoter, and writer	
Jacques Morali	(1947–1991)	French disco composer and co-creator of the Village People	
Alan Murphy	(1953–1989)	English guitarist, known for his work with Kate Bush and Level 42	
Billy Newton-Davis	(born 1951)	American-born Canadian R&B, gospel and jazz singer	
Klaus Nomi	(1944–1983)	German countertenor singer	
Rodel Naval	(1953–1995)	Filipino singer, songwriter and actor	
Stephen Oliver	(1950–1992)	English composer, known for his operas	
Chuck Panozzo	(born 1948)	American bass player and founding member of the rock band Styx	
Lonnie Pitchford	(1955–1998)	American blues musician and instrument maker	
Paul Prenter	(1946–1991)	Northern Irish music manager, known for being Freddie Mercury's manager from 1977 to 1986	
Lew Pryme	(1940–1990)	New Zealand pop singer and Executive Director of the Auckland Rugby Union	
Sharon Redd	(1945–1992)	American disco singer	
Scott Ross	(1951–1989)	American harpsichordist	
Frankie Ruiz	(1958–1998)	Puerto Rican salsa singer and composer	
Arthur Russell	(1951–1992)	American disco artist and cellist	
Renato Russo	(1960–1996)	Brazilian founder and leader of the rock band Legião Urbana	
Gil Scott-Heron	(1949–2011)	American poet, musician, author and spoken word performer known as "The Godfather of Rap"	
Mano Solo	(1963–2010)	French singer	
Jermaine Stewart	(1957–1997)	American pop singer	
Sylvester	(1947–1988)	American disco artist and drag performer	
Umanji	(c. 1968–2008)	South African musician and songwriter	
António Variações	(1944–1984)	Portuguese musician and songwriter; he was the first Portuguese celebrity to die of an AIDS-related illness	
Ricky Wilson	(1953–1985)	American guitarist and founding member of rock band The B-52's	
Conchita Wurst	(born 1988)	Austrian drag performer, singer and winner of the 2014 Eurovision Song Contest	
Miki Zone	(1955–1986)	American musician; member of Man 2 Man	
Zombo	(1979–2008)	South African singer, songwriter and music producer, best known as a member of kwaito group Abashante	

== Politics and law ==
Name	Life	Comments	Reference
Cal Anderson	(1948–1995)	US politician who was the first openly gay member of the Washington State Legislature	
Raymond Blain	(1950/51–1992)	Canadian politician whose election to the Montreal City Council in 1986 made him one of Canada's first openly gay politicians	
Edwin Cameron	(born 1953)	South African Supreme Court of Appeal judge	
Roy Cohn	(1927–1986)	American lawyer; came to prominence during the investigations by Senator Joseph McCarthy into alleged Communism in the U.S. government	
Corey Corbin	(born 1967)	Member of the New Hampshire House of Representatives from 2000 to 2004	
Brian Coyle	(1944–1991)	American community leader and local politician, member of the Minneapolis City Council	
Terry Dolan	(1950–1986)	American New Right political activist who founded and chaired the National Conservative Political Action Committee (NCPAC)	
James K. Dressel	(1943–1992)	American Republican state representative in the Michigan legislature; gay rights activist	
Thomas Duane	(born 1955)	American politician; first openly HIV-positive member of the New York City Council and the New York State Senate	
Nicholas Eden	(1930–1985)	British Conservative politician and son of Prime Minister Anthony Eden	
Juan Carlos Florián	(born 1982)	Colombian Humane Colombia politician; current Ministry of Equality and Equity	
Paul Gann	(1912–1989)	American politician, co-author of California Proposition 13 (1978)	
Greg Harris	(born 1955)	American politician from Illinois	
Alan Herbert	(1944–2023)	Canadian politician and HIV/AIDS activist; served as a member of the Vancouver City Council	
Richard A. Heyman	(1935–1994)	American politician; mayor of Key West, Florida in 1983–85 and 1987–89	
Jon Hinson	(1942–1995)	American politician; Member of the U.S. House of Representatives	
Corey Johnson	(born 1982)	American politician; Speaker of the New York City Council	
Ryuhei Kawada	(born 1976)	Japanese member of parliament who sued the government for failing to prevent HIV transmission through tainted blood products	
Michael Kühnen	(1955–1991)	German leader of the neo-Nazi scene	
Makgatho Mandela	(1950–2005)	South African attorney and son of former South African president Nelson Mandela	
Kevin McKenna	(born 1974)	British Labour Party politician; member of the House of Commons	
Larry McKeon	(1944–2008)	American politician and member of the Illinois House of Representatives	
Stewart McKinney	(1931–1987)	American politician; represented Connecticut in the House of Representatives from 1971 until his death	
Lloyd Russell-Moyle	(born 1986)	British Labour Party politician; former member of the House of Commons	
Dan Ryan	(born 1962)	Portland City Council member	
Carsten Schatz	(born 1970)	German state legislator in Berlin; first openly HIV-positive holder of political office in Germany	
Rand Schrader	(1945–1993)	Los Angeles Municipal Court judge	
Chris Smith	(born 1951)	British Labour Party politician; member of the House of Lords and former Secretary of State for Culture, Media and Sport	

== Pornographic acting ==
Name	Life	Comments	Reference
Nicky Crane	(1958–1993)	British pornographic actor and neo-Nazi activist	
Tricia Devereaux	(born 1975)	American pornographic actress	
Karen Dior	(1967–2004)	American transvestite pornographic actor	
Casey Donovan	(1943–1987)	American pornographic actor	
Fred Halsted	(1941–1989)	American pornographic actor	
John Holmes	(1944–1988)	American pornographic actor	
Darren James	(born 1964)	American pornographic actor; transmitted to Lara Roxx, Miss Arroyo and Jessica Dee, causing an international pornography-industry AIDS scare	
Tim Kramer	(1952/1958–1992)	American pornographic actor	
Robert La Tourneaux	(1941–1986)	American pornographic actor	
Richard Holt Locke	(1941–1996)	American pornographic actor	
Kurt Marshall	(1965–1988)	American pornographic actor	
Wade Nichols	(1946–1985)	American pornographic actor and soap opera actor	
Scott O'Hara	(1961–1998)	American pornographic actor, poet and editor/publisher	
Al Parker	(1958–1994)	American pornographic actor	
Erik Rhodes	(1982–2012)	American pornographic actor	
Lara Roxx	(born 1982)	Canadian pornographic actress	
Aiden Shaw	(born 1966)	British author, musician, model and former pornographic actor	
John Stagliano	(born 1951)	American pornographic actor; best known for his Buttman series of films, which is credited with sparking the gonzo adult film genre.	
Joey Stefano	(1968–1994)	American pornographic actor; was a model in Madonna's book Sex	
Marc Stevens	(1943–1989)	American pornographic actor	
Eric Stryker	(1954–1988)	American pornographic actor	
Cole Tucker	(1953–2015)	American pornographic actor	
Marc Wallice	(born 1959)	American adult film actor	
Josh Weston	(1973–2012)	American adult film actor	

== Scientifically notable infections ==
Name	Life	Comments	Reference
David J. Acer	(1949-1990)	American dentist who allegedly infected 6 of his patients, including Kimberly Bergalis, with HIV	
Kimberly Bergalis	(1968–1991)	American woman who alleged she had contracted HIV from her dentist	
Timothy Ray Brown	(1966–2020)	American man who was the first to be considered cured of HIV; also known as the "Berlin patient"	
Adam Castillejo	(born circa 1980)	Second person to have been considered cured of HIV; also known as the "London patient".	
Gaëtan Dugas	(1953–1984)	French-Canadian flight attendant who was widely, although incorrectly, identified as "Patient Zero" for the spread of HIV in North America.	
Arvid Noe	(1947–1976)	Norwegian sailor famous for being one of the first people known to have died from AIDS-related complications.	
Grethe Rask	(1930–1977)	Danish physician and surgeon, known for being one of the first confirmed cases of HIV/AIDS	
Robert Rayford	(1953–1969)	American teenager who may have been the first victim of HIV/AIDS in North America; his death came 12 years before the start of the AIDS epidemic in the U.S.	

== Sports ==
Name	Life	Comments	Reference
Arthur Ashe	(1943–1993)	American tennis player and social activist; won three Grand Slam titles.	
Mike Beuttler	(1940–1988)	British Formula One driver	
Glenn Burke	(1952–1995)	American Major League Baseball player for the Los Angeles Dodgers and Oakland Athletics	
John Curry	(1949–1994)	British figure skater who won the Olympic and World Championships in 1976	
Esteban de Jesús	(1951–1989)	Puerto Rican boxer; world lightweight champion	
Rudy Galindo	(born 1969)	American figure skater; won a bronze medal at the 1996 World Championships	
Bill Goldsworthy	(1944–1996)	Canadian ice hockey player; played in the National Hockey League for fourteen seasons	
Magic Johnson	(born 1959)	American basketball player; was named to the NBA All-Star team twelve times	
Job Komol	(born 1981)	Cameroonian soccerplayer at Vitesse Arnhem	
Thabang Lebese	(1973–2012)	South African association football player	
Greg Louganis	(born 1960)	American Olympic diver; best known for winning back-to-back Olympic titles in both the 3 m and 10 m events.	
Robert McCall	(1958–1991)	Canadian figure skater; won a bronze medal at the 1988 Winter Olympics	
Tommy Morrison	(1969–2013)	American boxer, WBO Heavyweight Champion, co-star of movie Rocky V	
Ondrej Nepela	(1951–1989)	Slovak figure skater; won gold medal at the 1972 Winter Olympics	
Brian Pockar	(1959–1992)	Canadian figure skater; won bronze medal at 1982 World Figure Skating Championships	
Stéphane Proulx	(1965–1993)	Canadian racing driver	
Tim Richmond	(1955–1989)	American NASCAR racing driver	
Roy Simmons	(1956–2014)	American professional football player who played as a guard for the New York Giants and Washington Redskins	
Jerry Smith	(1943–1987)	American professional football player who played as a tight end for the Washington Redskins	
Gareth Thomas	(born 1974)	Welsh rugby player	
Tom Waddell	(1937–1987)	American Olympic athlete; founded the Gay Games	
Robert Wagenhoffer	(1960–1999)	American figure skater; won a silver medal at the 1982 U.S. Figure Skating Championships	
Ji Wallace	(born 1977)	Australian gymnast and Olympic silver medallist	
Michael Westphal	(1965–1991)	German tennis player	
Alan Wiggins	(1958–1991)	American Major League Baseball player	
Sizwe Motaung	(1970–2001)	South African Soccer player	

== Theatre and dance ==
Name	Life	Comments	Reference
Alvin Ailey	(1931–1989)	American modern dancer and choreographer	
A. J. Antoon	(1944–1992)	American stage director who won a Tony Award in 1972 for directing the play That Championship Season.	
Rick Aviles	(1952–1995)	American comedian and actor	
Tony Azito	(1948–1995)	American dancer and character actor	
Dominique Bagouet	(1951–1992)	French choreographer and dancer	
Alan Bowne	(1945–1989)	American playwright and author	
Michael Bennett	(1943–1987)	American musical theater director, choreographer, and dancer; was the choreographer of the Broadway production of A Chorus Line.	
Christopher Chadman	(1948–1995)	American dancer and choreographer	
Gerald Chapman	(1950–1987)	English theater director and educator	
Robert Chesley	(1943–1990)	American playwright, theater critic and musical composer	
Dorian Corey	(c. 1937–1993)	American drag queen, best known for his appearance in the documentary film Paris Is Burning	
Stephanie Dabney	(1958–2022)	American ballerina, former Prima ballerina with Dance Theatre of Harlem.	
Martin de Maat	(1948–2001)	American teacher and artistic director at The Second City in Chicago	
Jorge Donn	(1947–1992)	Argentine ballet dancer with the Maurice Béjart ballet company and artistic director of the Ballet of the 20th Century	
Ulysses Dove	(1947–1996)	American contemporary choreographer	
Ethyl Eichelberger	(1945–1990)	American drag performer, playwright and actor	
Tony Fields	(1958–1995)	American dancer	
Wayland Flowers	(1939–1988)	American entertainer and ventriloquist	
Christopher Gillis	(1951–1993)	Canadian dancer and choreographer; formed the Paul Taylor Dance Company	
Choo San Goh	(1948–1987)	Singaporean ballet dancer and choreographer	
Hibiscus	(1949–1982)	American founder of the psychedelic drag queen troupe The Cockettes.	
René Highway	(1954–1990)	Canadian Cree actor and dancer	
John Hirsch	(1930–1989)	Hungarian-Canadian theatre director	
Jade Elektra	(born 1967)	American born, Canada-based drag queen and recording artist	
Robert Joffrey	(1930–1988)	American dancer, teacher, producer, and choreographer	
Bill T. Jones	(born 1952)	American dancer, choreographer and director	
Gibson Kente	(1932–2004)	South African playwright, known as the Father of Black Theatre in South Africa	
Lady Catiria	(1959–1999)	Puerto Rican drag performer, known for her appearance in the 1995 film To Wong Foo, Thanks for Everything! Julie Newmar.	
Larry Kert	(1930–1991)	American Broadway performer; played in West Side Story and Company	
Bernard-Marie Koltès	(1948–1989)	French playwright and theatre director	
Charles Ludlam	(1943–1987)	American actor and playwright	
Thom McGinty	(1952–1995)	Scottish-Irish street mime, stage and film actor, widely known as "The Diceman"	
Roger Montoya	(born 1961)	American dancer, community arts instructor and politician	
Jean-Louis Morin	(1953–1995)	Canadian choreographer and dancer	
Javier Muñoz	(born 1975)	Puerto Rican-American actor mainly known for his role in the Broadway musicals Hamilton and In the Heights.	
Willi Ninja	(1961–2006)	American dancer and choreographer, best known for his appearance in the documentary film Paris Is Burning.	
Rudolf Nureyev	(1938–1993)	Russian ballet dancer and choreographer	
Michael Peters	(1948–1994)	American choreographer; choreographed the fifteen-minute Michael Jackson music video Thriller	
Craig Russell	(1948–1990)	Canadian female impersonator	
John Sex	(1956–1989)	American cabaret singer and performance artist	
Ron Vawter	(1949–1994)	American actor; founding member of the artists ensemble The Wooster Group	
Nashom Wooden	(1969–2020)	American drag queen and notable New York City nightlife personality	
Angie Xtravaganza	(c. 1966–1993)	American transgender performer, best known for her appearance in the documentary film Paris Is Burning.	
Arnie Zane	(1947–1988)	Co-founder with Bill T. Jones of Bill T. Jones/Arnie Zane Dance Company	

== Visual arts and fashion ==
Name	Life	Comments	Reference
Carlos Almaraz	(1941–1989)	Mexican American artist and pioneer of the Chicano art movement	
Mario Amaya	(1933–1986)	American art critic, museum director, magazine editor	
Richard Amsel	(1947–1985)	American graphic artist and illustrator best known for his movie posters from the 1970s and 1980s	
Joe Average	(1957–2024)	Vancouver-based Canadian visual artist	
Way Bandy	(1941–1986)	American celebrity makeup artist	
Crawford Barton	(1943–1993)	American photographer whose work is known for documenting the emergence of the openly gay culture in San Francisco in the 1960s and 1970s.	
Tom Bianchi	(born 1945)	American writer and photographer who specializes in male nude photography	
Lorenza Böttner	(1959–1994)	Disabled transgender Chilean-German visual artist	
Leigh Bowery	(1961–1994)	Australian performance artist, fashion designer, dancer and model	
Scott Burton	(1939–1989)	American sculptor, performance artist, and writer	
Gia Carangi	(1960–1986)	American supermodel of the late 1970s and early 1980s	
Tina Chow	(1951–1992)	American restaurateur and model	
Copi	(1939–1987)	Argentine-French comics artist, cartoonist and playwright	
DONDI	(1961–1998)	American graffiti artist	
Perry Ellis	(1940–1986)	American fashion designer; his name still represents the sportswear fashion house he founded in the mid-1970s	
José Gonzalez Espaliú	(1955 - 1993)	Spanish performance and conceptual artist whose art focused on marginalization of himself and others with AIDS	
Vincent Fourcade	(1934–1992)	French American interior designer	
Xavier Fourcade	(1927–1987)	French American contemporary art dealer; brother of Vincent Fourcade	
Robert Fraser	(1937–1986)	British art dealer	
Félix González-Torres	(1957–1996)	Cuban-American artist	
Mondo Guerra	(born 1978)	Mexican-American fashion designer	
Halston	(1932–1990)	American fashion designer	
Keith Haring	(1958–1990)	American pop artist and social activist, known for his recognizable animated imagery	
Andrew Heard	(1958–1993)	British visual artist	
Henfil	(1944–1988)	Brazilian cartoonist and comics artist, best known for his character Graúna	
Sighsten Herrgård	(1943–1989)	Swedish fashion designer; first Swedish celebrity to publicize his HIV-positive status	
Victor Hugo	(1948–1994)	Venezuelan-born visual artist and former partner of fashion designer Halston	
Peter Hujar	(1934–1987)	American photographer	
Patrick Kelly	(1954–1990)	American fashion designer	
Peter Klashorst	(born 1957)	Dutch painter, sculptor, photographer and conceptual artist	
John Kobal	(1940–1991)	British film historian and photograph collector	
Kia LaBeija	(born 1990)	American fine artist	
Larry LeGaspi	(1950–2001)	American fashion designer	
Grant Lingard	(1961–1995)	New Zealand visual artist	
Antonio Lopez	(1943–1987)	Puerto-Rican fashion illustrator	
Jack Mackenroth	(born 1969)	American swimmer, model, gay pornographic film actor, and fashion designer	
Robert Mapplethorpe	(1946–1989)	American photographer	
Alexander McQueen	(1969–2010)	British fashion designer	
Frank C. Moore	(1953–2002)	American artist; designer of the red ribbon symbol of AIDS awareness	
Jesse Murry	(1948–1993)	American painter	
Tommy Nutter	(1943–1992)	British Savile Row tailor and fashion designer	
Gustavo Ojeda	(1958–1989)	Cuban-American painter	
Matthias Ostermann	(1951–2009)	German-Canadian ceramics artist and author	
Felix Partz	(1945–1994)	Canadian artist, member of the artist collective General Idea	
Neal Pozner	(1955–1994)	American comics writer, editor and art director; worked for DC Comics	
Joel Resnicoff	(1948–1986)	American artist and fashion illustrator	
Herb Ritts	(1952–2002)	American photographer and video director, best known for his work with Madonna	
Tom Rubnitz	(1956–1992)	American video artist	
David Seidner	(1957–1999)	American photographer	
Al Shapiro	(1932–1987)	American comics artist (Harry Chess)	
Willi Smith	(1948–1987)	American fashion designer	
Hugh Auchincloss Steers	(1962–1995)	American painter	
William Ware Theiss	(1931–1992)	American film and television costume designer best known for his work on the Star Trek television and film franchise	
Paul Thek	(1933–1988)	American painter, sculptor and installation artist	
Sam Wagstaff	(1921–1987)	American art curator and collector	
Adrian Ward-Jackson	(1950–1991)	British art dealer and consultant; close friend of Diana, Princess of Wales	
Frederick Weston	(1946–2020)	African-American artist whose collages were recognized for their quality late in his life.	
David Wojnarowicz	(1954–1992)	American artist, writer and activist	
Martin Wong	(1946–1999)	Chinese-American painter	
Jorge Zontal	(1944–1994)	Canadian artist, member of the artist collective General Idea	

== Writing ==
Name	Life	Comments	Reference
Caio Fernando Abreu	(1948–1996)	Brazilian writer and journalist	
Gordon Stewart Anderson	(c. 1958–1991)	Canadian writer whose novel The Toronto You Are Leaving was published by his mother 15 years after his death	
Reinaldo Arenas	(1943–1990)	Cuban novelist who committed suicide while living in New York	
Jean-Paul Aron	(1925–1988)	French writer and journalist; known as one the first French celebrities to publicly reveal his diagnosis.	
Isaac Asimov	(1920–1992)	Russian-born American science fiction author and professor of biochemistry at Boston University	
Simon Bailey	(1955–1995)	British Anglican priest and writer	
John Boswell	(1947–1994)	American historian and a professor at Yale University	
Harold Brodkey	(1930–1996)	American author, known for his memoir This Wild Darkness: The Story of My Death, which documents his battle with AIDS.	
Marvelyn Brown	(born 1984)	American writer and HIV/AIDS activist who wrote an autobiography, The Naked Truth: Young, Beautiful and (HIV) Positive, documenting her diagnosis and struggle with HIV	
Warren Casey	(1935–1988)	American playwright best known for co-writing the 1972 Broadway musical Grease	
Bruce Chatwin	(1940–1989)	British novelist and travel writer, best known for his book In Patagonia.	
Cyril Collard	(1957–1993)	French writer, actor and director of the autobiographical novel and film Savage Nights	
Timothy Conigrave	(1959–1994)	Australian playwright and author of the memoir Holding the Man	
Steven Corbin	(1953–1995)	American writer	
Christopher Cox	(1949–1990)	American writer and editor	
Peter Cureton	(1965–1994)	Canadian playwright, best known for his 1993 play Passages, an autobiographical work about living with HIV/AIDS	
Sam D'Allesandro	(1956–1988)	American poet and fiction writer	
Serge Daney	(1944–1992)	French film critic	
Nicholas Dante	(1941–1991)	American dancer and playwright, known for the musical A Chorus Line; first Latino to win a Pulitzer Prize for Drama	
Tory Dent	(1958–2005)	American poet, art critic and commentator on the AIDS crisis	
Guillaume Dustan	(1965–2005)	French writer	
Michael Estok	(1939–1989)	Canadian poet, known for his posthumous collection A Plague Year Journal	
David B. Feinberg	(1956–1994)	American writer and AIDS activist with ACT UP	
Robert Ferro	(1941–1988)	American novelist	
Michel Foucault	(1926–1984)	French historian of ideas, literary critic and political activist; first French public figure to die from AIDS-related complications	
Ken Garnhum	(living)	Canadian playwright, best known for his plays Beuys, Buoys, Boys and Pants on Fire	
Steve Geng	(1943–2020)	American writer, known for his memoir Thick As Thieves; brother of New Yorker writer and editor Veronica Geng	
Jaime Gil de Biedma	(1929–1990)	Spanish poet	
Michael Grumley	(1942–1988)	American writer	
Hervé Guibert	(1955–1990)	French writer and filmmaker	
Richard Hall	(1926–1992)	American writer	
Essex Hemphill	(1957–1995)	American poet and activist	
Guy Hocquenghem	(1944–1988)	French writer and philosopher	
Bo Huston	(1959–1993)	American writer	
Arturo Islas	(1938–1991)	Mexican-American professor of English and writer	
Frans Kellendonk	(1951–1990)	Dutch novelist and translator	
Gregory Kolovakos	(1951–1990)	American translator	
Greg Kramer	(1961–2013)	Canadian writer	
Larry Kramer	(1935–2020)	American dramatist, author and gay rights activist	
Didier Lestrade	(born 1958)	French journalist and author	
Hezi Leskali	(1952–1994)	Israeli poet, artist and choreographer	
Arnold Lobel	(1933–1987)	American children's book author and illustrator	
Michael Lynch	(1944–1991)	Canadian poet, journalist and academic	
Dambudzo Marechera	(1952–1987)	Zimbabwean writer	
Peter McGehee	(1955–1991)	American-born Canadian writer	
Richie McMullen	(1943–1991)	British author and activist against male rape	
Peter McWilliams	(1940–2000)	American writer and libertarian activist	
James Merrill	(1926–1995)	American winning poet, known for his collection Divine Comedies	
Ernest Matthew Mickler	(1940–1988)	American author of the cookbook White Trash Cooking	
Paul Monette	(1945–1995)	American novelist and poet	
John Preston	(1945–1994)	American author of gay erotica and editor of gay nonfiction anthologies	
Manuel Ramos Otero	(1948–1990)	Puerto Rican short story writer	
Paul Reed	(1956–2002)	American writer	
Barbara Samson	(born 1975)	French poet who was infected with HIV at the age of seventeen; her story was made into the French television film Being Seventeen.	
Severo Sarduy	(1937–1993)	Gay Cuban poet and author	
Dick Scanlan	(born 1961)	American librettist, writer and actor	
Nicholas Schaffner	(1953–1991)	American music writer, best known for his books about the Beatles	
Ronald M. Schernikau	(1960–1991)	German writer	
Jay Scott	(1949–1993)	Canadian film critic	
Kevin Sessums	(born 1956)	American memoirist, editor, and celebrity interviewer	
Randy Shilts	(1951–1994)	American journalist and author, known for the book And the Band Played On which documents the outbreak of AIDS in the United States.	
Ian Stephens	(1955–1996)	Canadian poet and spoken word artist (Diary of a Trademark)	
George Stambolian	(1938–1991)	American professor of French literature and editor of gay fiction anthologies	
Andrew Sullivan	(born 1963)	British-American journalist and blogger	
Pier Vittorio Tondelli	(1955–1991)	Italian novelist; he was one of the first Italian public figures to die of an AIDS-related illness	
Colin Turnbull	(1924–1994)	British American anthropologist	
Yvonne Vera	(1964–2005)	Zimbabwean author	
Matthew Ward	(1951–1990)	American English/French translator, known for his 1989 translation of Albert Camus's The Stranger.	
Edmund White	(1940–2025)	American novelist, memoirist, biographer and essayist	
LeRoy Whitfield	(1969–2005)	American freelance journalist who chronicled his personal experience with HIV infection and AIDS.	
George Whitmore	(1946–1989)	American novelist, playwright and poet, known for his novel Nebraska	
Alexander Wilson	(1953–1993)	American-born Canadian writer, teacher, landscape designer and community activist	

== Miscellaneous ==
Name	Life	Comments	Reference
Sheldon Andelson	(1931–1987)	American regent of the University of California.	
Victoria Arellano	(1984–2007)	Mexican immigrant who died from an AIDS-related illness while in custody of U.S. Immigration and Customs Enforcement (ICE)	
Kuwasi Balagoon	(1946–1986)	American anarchist and member of the Black Liberation Army	
Nozipho Bhengu	(1974–2006)	South African woman who became famous for opting not to take antiretroviral medication on the advice of health minister Manto Tshabalala-Msimang.	
José María Di Bello	(born 1968)	One of the first gay Argentine citizens (along with partner Alex Freyre) to be granted the right to marry in Argentina	
Larry Eyler	(1952-1994)	American serial killer	
Dean Faiello	(1959–2024)	American criminal	
John Wesley Fletcher	(1940–1996)	American Assemblies of God pastor	
Althea Flynt	(1953–1987)	American co-publisher of pornographic magazine Hustler along with her husband, Hustler founder Larry Flynt	
Kendall Francois	(1971–2014)	Haitian American serial killer	
Alex Freyre	(born 1970)	One of the first gay Argentine citizens (along with partner José María Di Bello) to be granted the right to marry in Argentina	
David Hampton	(1964–2003)	American con artist. His story became the inspiration for a play and later a film, titled Six Degrees of Separation.	
Terry Higgins	(1945–1982)	One of the first British people to die of AIDS; gave his name to the Terrence Higgins Trust.	
Gervase Jackson-Stops	(1947–1995)	British architectural historian and journalist	
Marsha P. Johnson	(1945–1992)	American LGBT civil rights leader and trans activist	
Suzi Lovegrove	(1955–1987)	American-born Australian woman; subject of the 1988 HBO film "Suzi's Story", which chronicles her battle with AIDS	
Michael Lupo	(1953–1995)	Italian serial killer who murdered four homosexuals as revenge for his contracting HIV	
Christine Maggiore	(1957–2008)	American AIDS denialist who refused interventions to reduce the risk of transmitting HIV to her children; her three-year-old daughter died of complications from AIDS in 2005	
Leonard Matlovich	(1943–1988)	American Vietnam War veteran, known for fighting the U.S. military in 1975 for the right to serve as an openly gay man.	
Kongulu Mobutu	(c. 1970–1998)	Son of Mobutu Sese Seko, former president of the Democratic Republic of the Congo; officer in the presidential guard	
Richard Nyauza	(born 1970)	South African serial killer	
Phillip Paske	(1953–1998)	American criminal and child pornographer	
Marty Robinson	(1942–1992)	American gay activist who participated in the Stonewall Riot	
Ed Savitz	(1942–1993)	American businessman accused of sexually abusing children	
Gregory Scarpa	(1928–1994)	American mobster	
Michael Shernoff	(1951–2008)	American mental health professional who wrote extensively on HIV/AIDS prevention and the mental health concerns of gay men	
Lou Sullivan	(1951–1991)	American transsexual activist and author	
Lucille Teasdale-Corti	(1929–1996)	Canadian physician, surgeon and international aid worker, who worked in Uganda and contributed to the development of medical services in the country	
Ösel Tendzin	(1943–1990)	American Buddhist regent	
Ottis Toole	(1947–1996)	American serial killer	
