= Robert Hawkins (artist) =

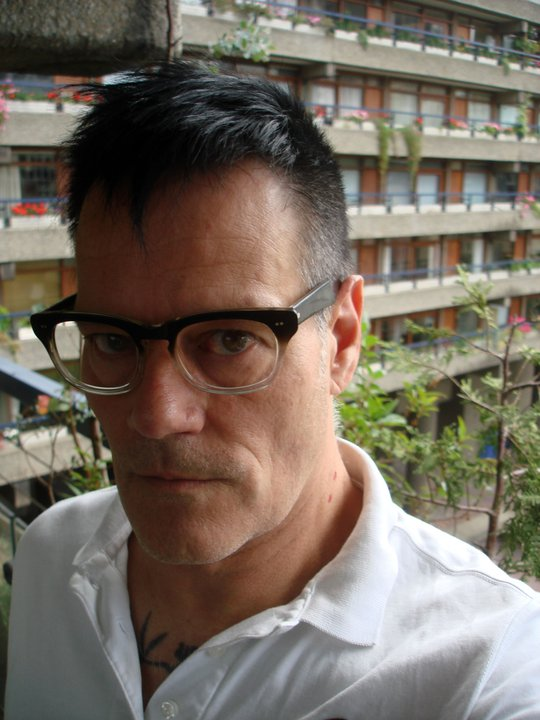
- Robert Hawkins in 2014
- Born: Sunnyvale, California, United States
- Movement: Pseudorealism

Robert Hawkins is an American artist born in Sunnyvale, California, USA and presently lives in London, UK., Hawkins' is best known for his "ferocious" style of realism. His first drawing in a publication appeared in the kid's section of the San Francisco Chronicle at the age of 5.

== 1960s ==
Hawkins' talent was recognized throughout his childhood and teenage years and won "The Best Artist Award" in both his Freshman and Senior years at Homestead High School (Cupertino, California) in the western section of Sunnyvale.

== 1970s ==
Hawkins moved from Sunnyvale to San Francisco in 1970 where he became involved in the glam and then the early punk music and art scene. Attracted to Haight Ashbury and the counter culture at first, in the end it was the natural beauty of the city, the public parks, cemeteries, and waterfronts that began to become the subjects of his artwork. Hawkins' kinship with nature led him to work at Yosemite National Park before moving to New York in 1978.

== 1980s ==
During the 1980s, Hawkins created a presence within the early 80's art scene in lower Manhattan. His first group showing titled "Three Americans" at Club 57 was with fellow artists Edward Brezinski and Brian Goodfellow in 1981. In 1980, Hawkins participated in a group show at the Mudd Club Gallery at the Mudd Club curated by Keith Haring. Hawkins' first solo show was at the Anderson Theatre Gallery in 1983 curated by art dealer Patrick Fox, who would represent Hawkins throughout the 1980s. Fox opened the Patrick Fox Gallery in 1983, where Hawkins had another solo show.

In 1985 Hawkins had a solo show at the Lynne Ida Gallery in Denver, Colorado. That year, Hawkins also had a solo show at Alexander Wood Gallery in New York. Hawkins then participates in a group show with artists, Jack Barth, Vincent Gallo, Bruce Mellett and Gustavo Ojeda at the Luhring Augustine and Hodes Gallery in New York in 1985.

In 1986, Hawkins had another solo show with Patrick Fox at his new gallery now called 56 Bleecker followed by a collaborative show with the fashion designer, Stephen Sprouse at 56 Bleecker Gallery in 1987. "Dead Things by Living Artists" was Hawkins next 1987 show at Bond Gallery in New York.

== 1990s ==
In 1991, Hawkins participated in the group show, "Value Project" curated by Kathl in New York. In 1992, he had a solo exhibition, "Transformations" at The Lee Arthur Studio in New York followed by "The Pet Show", a group show at The Helander Gallery in New York.

In 1993 he participated in the group show, "Urban Analysis" at the Barbara Braathen Gallery in New York. Another solo show in 1994 was at The Lee Arthur studio in New York, followed by a solo exhibit at The Leo-Tony Gallery in 1994, as well. In 1995, Hawkins has a solo exhibition at the Grand Hotel Concord in Lyon, France, followed by participation in "Art Junction" at the Palais de Festivals in Cannes, France.

In 1996, he participated in "Round Up" at The Livestock Gallery in New York, followed by a solo exhibition at The Livestock Gallery titled, "Remix Show" in 1997. Another solo show followed in 1997 at Livestock Gallery, titled "Promenade Nocturne". In 1997 Hawkins also participated in a "Benefit for Pat Hearn", at The Pat Hearn Gallery in New York followed by participation in the group show, "Hybrid 1", at The Kitchen in New York. 1997 brought three more participations in group shows in New York; "Modern Myths" curated by Christopher Chambers at 450 Broadway Gallery, "Prime" at Livestock Gallery, and "More" curated by Tony Payne at The Xavier LaBoulbene Gallery.

1998 brought participation in two more New York group shows, "Pets" at the Bronwyn Keenan Gallery and "Sourpuss" curated by Christopher Chambers at the Abraham Lubelski Gallery. In 1998 Hawkins participated in "He Swam Down, Away" curated by Tony Payn at the Massimo Audiello Fine Art Gallery in New York followed by "Re Duchamp", curated by Mike Bidlo at the Abraham Lubelski Gallery in New York in 1998, as well. Hawkins closed 1998 with "The Bowie Show" at the Rupert Goldsworthy Fine Art Gallery in New York.

In 1999, Hawkins participated in "Real to Surreal" curated by Mark Sink at the Museum of Contemporary Art Denver in Colorado followed by the group show, "The Bohio Benefit" curated by Carlo McCormick at New York's Charas/El Bohio in 1992, as well. That year, Hawkins illustrated an anthology of poems for the poet, critic and artist Rene Ricard titled, "Love Poems., edited by Richard Hell.

== 2000s ==
In 2000, Hawkins participated in the group show, "Heroes of the Unexplained" at The Gracie Mansion Gallery in New York. Hawkins lived in the Battery Park neighborhood of the World Trade Center and lost his residence on September 11, 2001. His partner was from London and they moved there shortly thereafter.

Hawkins had a solo exhibition at Gracie Mansion Gallery in 2002. That year, Hawkins also participated in “Eighties Art Stars,” featuring works of Jean-Michel Basquiat, Richard Hambleton, Keith Haring, Robert Hawkins and Rene Ricard at The Fountain Walk Gallery, Charleston, SC. In 2003 Hawkins participated in "Artists", a group show at The Bowman Studio in New York.

In 2006, Hawkins participated in a London group show, "Drawings 1978-2006: Andy Warhol, Robert Hawkins and Jonathan Meese" at The Pollock Fine Art Gallery in London.

In 2008, Hawkins' work "How to Draw Andy Warhol" was published in Interview Magazine, celebrating what would have been Warhol's 80th birthday. That year, Hawkins had a solo exhibition at The Half Gallery in New York

== 2010s ==
In 2010, Hawkins participated in Sisley Art Project's show at The Warhol curated by Glenn O'Brien. Hawkins was joined by fellow artists, Castronovo, Rita Ackermann, Frederick Fab Five Freddy Brathwaite, Dan Colen, Ronnie Cutrone, Jean-Philippe Delhomme, Jane Dickson, Duncan Hannah, Brad Kahlhamer, Nate Lowman, Marco Perego, Lee Quiñones, Tom Sachs, Kenny Scharf, Walter Steding and Ouattara Watts. The works were auctioned at Christie's New York to benefit The Warhol Museum.

In 2011, Hawkins collaborated with Dublin artist Liam Ryan for a two-man show of their works at The Residence Gallery in London. In 2013, Hawkins had a solo exhibit at The Residence Gallery titled, "Power over Nature Suite". In 2014, Hawkins participated in a group show, "In Dreams" at The Cob Gallery in London.

== Criticism ==
Cookie Mueller, (1983), Details Magazine... “It’s sensational, a banquet, a veritable luau of fantasies.”

Rene Ricard, (1993,) Jean Michel Basquiat Catalog, Whitney Museum ..."You cannot name one painter of his generation comparison with whom Basquiat would not find laughable. the exception would be Robert Hawkins whose work Jean admired and collected"

Glenn O' Brien (June 21, 2006), GQ Magazine ..."Robert Hawkins is not a big famous artist because he has resisted all attempts to make him that. And, up to a point, that was necessary and right. But now that he has a large, madcap, ferociously witty, and startlingly original body of work behind him; now that he has gone through his self-crucifixion phase and resurrected himself from the dead; now that he has allowed the smile to follow quickly the scowl; now, I think, it's time he can relax and enjoy making artwork on his own roving, druidical, picaroon, anarchic, swashbuckling terms."

Breidenbach, Tom (October, 2008), Artforum ..."at once brooding and celebratory, a triumph of a sort of "outsider" aesthetic that refuses to be pinned down to one attitude, whether cynical. fantastical, or satirical."
