= Randy Ray =

Randy Ray may refer to:

- A pseudonym of Randy Travis, used for example on his 1982 live album Randy Ray: Live at the Nashville Palace
- Randy Ray (1979–2023), one of the Ray brothers
- Randy Ray, a member of Legend Seven
