= Enchanted Boy =

Novel by Richie McMullen

- Author: Richie McMullen
- Language: English
- Genre: Novel
- Publisher: GMP Publishers
- Publication date: 1989
- Publication place: United Kingdom
- Media type: Hardback and paperback
- Pages: 123 pp (paperback edition)
- ISBN: 0-85449-098-1 (paperback edition)
- OCLC: 18961948

Enchanted Boy is an autobiographical novel by Richie McMullen, published by Gay Men's Press in 1989. It describes his childhood from age five to fifteen in post-war working-class Catholic Liverpool. Richie is physically abused by his father, and becomes a rent boy for adult men as a form of escape. The novel was striking for its emotional honesty depicting "an abused boy turning to the rent scene not just for money, but for affection". The novel was followed by a sequel, Enchanted Youth (GMP, 1990), and formed part of the author's lifelong work to address male rape.

== Plot summary ==
Richie is routinely physically abused by his father, a drunk who works in the construction industry. Richie adores his elder brother James and leads a life of petty crime and childhood dares with his friends. At the age of eight, he is molested in a cinema by a man who persuades him to come home with him. From this point, Richie regularly runs away from home and finds that this has the effect of stopping the abuse from his father. He experiments with a friend, Pip, whose prostitution excites and disgusts him in equal measure, and he begins to work as a rent boy. Richie is raped twice: once by an older cousin in the British Merchant Navy, and a second time by a pair of men. At fourteen, falls for Mike, but Mike prefers girls and so their relationship is long-lasting but doomed. The novel ends with Richie at age fifteen, considering moving to London to make his living as a rent boy.

== Reception ==
Enchanted Boy was reviewed in gay periodicals including Pink Paper, Gay Scotland, and the Gay Times. Pink Paper said it was "chiefly notable for the courage of its simplicity and openness" and suggested McMullen should write a sequel. Gay Scotland also praised the book's "wonderful honesty," and described the book as "moving" while still allowing for dignity, rather than pity, in Richie's story. The Gay Times was more ambivalent; their review quoted McMullin's preface, which asks the reader to "suspend any judgments which this book might evoke," to which the reviewer says, "maybe that's the best thing to do". Graeme Wollaston at the Gay Times named it one of his two "Books of the Year," despite the fact that the writing was sometimes unpolished and "written in an unfortunate convention -- a 'dramatised' autobiography, with dialogue supposedly recalled from many years ago," because of the compelling events it describes.

== Sequel ==
A sequel, Enchanted Youth, was published by GMP in 1990. It begins with Richie moving to London in 1958, joining a group of rent boys in Piccadilly Circus. It presents Richie's warm memory of camaraderie with other rent boys and a love story with a boy at a public school, as well as harrowing experiences: rape, torture, syphilis, and the murder of one of the other rent boys.

The Gay Times called the sequel more narratively polished than Enchanted Boy, especially in the structure of its love story subplot, though it found the sex scenes jarring. The Pink Paper was less impressed with the writing, describing the book as unfocused due to its attempt to cover too many details, and criticizing its flowery romantic language. The Observer concluded that "[t]he intrinsic interest of the subject may allow one to ignore McMullen's impossibly purple prose". Publishers Weekly described Enchanted Youth as a "sensitive, revealing memoir" which "has its horrors" but nonetheless "emphasizes the good in people rather than the sordid or demeaning".
