= The Perth Group =

HIV/AIDS denialist group based in Perth, Western Australia

The Perth Group is a group of HIV/AIDS denialists based in Perth, Western Australia who claim, in opposition to the scientific consensus, that the existence of HIV (Human Immunodeficiency Virus) is not proven, and that AIDS and all the "HIV" phenomena are caused by changes in cellular redox due to the oxidative nature of substances and exposures common to all the AIDS risk groups, and are caused by the cell conditions used in the "culture" and "isolation" of "HIV".

The group's activism has negatively affected the epidemic of HIV/AIDS in South Africa due to their influence on the AIDS policies of South African President Thabo Mbeki. The resulting governmental refusal to provide effective anti-HIV treatment in South Africa has been blamed for hundreds of thousands of premature AIDS-related deaths in South Africa.

In 2007 the testimony of several group members was thrown out of court during the trial of an HIV-positive man charged with reckless transmission of HIV. Robert Gallo has stated that he was amazed at the Perth Group's "mass ignorance coupled with the grandiosity of selling themselves as experts".

== Membership ==
While overall membership has changed, the core members of the group are biophysicist Eleni Papadopulos-Eleopulos (deceased), emergency physician Valendar F. Turner and pathologist John Papadimitriou. The group was founded in 1981. Members of the group work at Royal Perth Hospital, though the relationship is disputed. Papadopulos-Eleopulos was described as a technician at the hospital, while Turner and Papadimitriou are faculty members. The hospital has declaimed any relationship to the Group's beliefs, and made a point of stating Papadopulos-Eleopulos did not work with AIDS patients or conduct any research on HIV.

== Claims ==
The group's primary claim is that the existence of HIV (the human immunodeficiency virus) is not proven. A number of other claims follow from this one. The group acknowledges that AIDS exists, but denies that it is caused by HIV infection, producing a list of ten positions that attempts to criticize the established science that HIV causes AIDS. Instead, the group attributes AIDS deaths to on oxidative damage caused by factors unrelated to viral infection, such as drug use, homosexual activity between men (primarily exposure to semen), poverty and the medications used to treat AIDS. The group also denies that the causative agent of AIDS is transmitted through heterosexual sexual activity.

Sociologist Seth Kalichman, author of a book on AIDS denialism, described the group's claims as confusing and inconsistent, using complicated explanations and rhetorical techniques to "sound scientific" in their incorrect assertions regarding HIV/AIDS research. Kalichman notes that although oxidation does affect the immune system, none of the processes claimed by the Perth Group cause AIDS, whose cause has been definitively identified as HIV infection. Writing in the Skeptical Inquirer, professor of economics and the director of the AIDS and Society Research Unit at the University of Cape Town Nicoli Nattrass suggested that their beliefs may in part be due to misunderstanding of the science involved.

As the group denies that the human immunodeficiency virus itself exists, the denialist magazine Continuum offered a £1,000 reward for anybody who can produce evidence for its existence. Peter Duesberg, an AIDS denialist who claims HIV exists but is harmless, provided evidence of the existence of HIV and claimed the reward, but the magazine did not provide the money because the Perth Group challenged his claim.

== Influence ==
=== Parenzee trial ===
Members of the Perth Group attempted to testify at the trial of Andre Chad Parenzee, an Australian man charged with endangering human life after having unprotected sex with three women despite knowing he was HIV-positive, but the supreme court judge threw out their claims as "implausible." Robert Gallo, discoverer of HIV, testified at the trial and noted that Turner, who had also testified, had incorrectly claimed HIV was identified through the activity of reverse transcription when in fact it was identified through the presence of the reverse transcriptase enzyme, stating that '"only a fool" would mistake the two'. Gallo pointed out during the trial that Turner lacked any credibility to testify during the trial regarding HIV infection as he lacked any qualifications as a virologist and conducted no research in the field. Gallo later stated in an e-mail that he was amazed at the Perth Group's "mass ignorance coupled with the grandiosity of selling themselves as experts". Australian Research biologist Gustav Nossal, along with several other Australian scientists, gave evidence during the trial and described the group as '"a very considerable embarrassment" to Australian science'.

=== South African HIV/AIDS policy ===
The Perth Group's claims have also been cited in controversies about HIV/AIDS in South Africa, and were influential in the positions held by South African President Thabo Mbeki regarding HIV/AIDS in the country. Papadopulos-Eleopulos and Turner were panelists in the Presidential AIDS Advisory Panel established by Mbeki. The resulting governmental refusal to provide effective anti-HIV treatment in South Africa has been blamed for hundreds of thousands of premature AIDS-related deaths in South Africa.
