= Valentino Talluto =

Italian man (born 1984)

Valentino Talluto (born 1984) is an Italian man who was charged in 2017 for the criminal transmission of HIV to at least 30 women and sentenced to 24 years' imprisonment.

== Discovery of infection ==
Talluto discovered his HIV positive status in 2006, after which he continued to contact and have relations with women via social networks, using the pseudonym "Hearty Style". He denied his HIV status when confronted by people he had infected, after they discovered that they had contracted the virus, either through health issues or having been alerted by other partners of Talluto.

== Arrest and trial ==
Talluto was arrested in November 2015, nearly a decade after the discovery of his HIV positive status. His trial began in March 2017. He was convicted in Rome on 27 October 2017.

== See also ==
- List of HIV-positive people § Criminal transmission of HIV
