= Kevin Borick =

Australian barrister

Kevin Borick KC, is a criminal-law barrister in South Australia, and president of the Australian Criminal Lawyers Association.

His notable cases include:

- Cheatle v The Queen (1993) 177 CLR 541, case which determined that there is an implied right in the Australian Constitution that a jury verdict for Federal crimes must be unanimous.
- Andre Chad Parenzee, convicted of endangering human life by having unprotected sex while falsely denying to his partners that he was HIV positive, and transmitting the virus. Borick argued against the conviction on the basis that HIV doesn't cause AIDS. The judge found otherwise.
- Henry Keogh, convicted of the 1994 murder of his fiancée, who was found dead in a bathtub. Borick argued that she hadn't drowned, but had died from some other, unknown cause. Keogh had bought insurance policies on his victim, forging her signature. Borick argued that many people sign their partner's names on insurance policies.
- Raymond Frederick Ayles, an Anglican priest, was given a 12-month suspended sentence in 1993 after being convicted of encouraging two 15-year-old boys to masturbate in front of him during a church camp. He did not lose his 1987 award until 1998. Borick appealed, claiming the priest was "genuinely in love" with the boy, which needed to be taken into account. Ayles was stripped of his Order of Australia honour.
