= Henry Keogh =

Australian wrongly convicted of murder

- Born: 1954 (age 71–72)
- Status: Conviction quashed 19 December 2014
- Conviction: Murder
- Penalty: 26 years imprisonment

Henry Vincent Keogh (born 1954) is an Australian who was wrongly convicted of murder but was eventually released twenty years later on appeal. He grew up in Adelaide, South Australia and was educated at Saint Ignatius College and briefly at the School of Dentistry at The University of Adelaide.

In 1995, he was sentenced to 26 years in prison for the 1994 murder of his 29-year-old fiancée, Anna-Jane Cheney, then head of Professional Conduct at the Law Society of South Australia: it was alleged that Keogh had planned the murder for over two years.

Keogh and his family have always claimed his innocence, and raised their doubts regarding some of the evidence upon which the conviction was based.

Keogh admitted to signing five life insurance policies on behalf of Cheney. Whereas the prosecution alleged the combined value of $1.15 million AUD was motive for the murder, Keogh claimed that these were submitted to prevent insurance agencies he had established from lapsing, and that the amount eligible to claim was closer to $400,000. The prosecution conceded during the trial that Cheney was aware of at least two of these policies.

The conviction was overturned on 19 December 2014.

The third trial was set for March 2016 but a key prosecution witness fell ill. On 13 November 2015 the Director of Public Prosecutions (DPP) announced they had entered a nolle prosequi and would not be proceeding with a retrial at this stage.

== Petitions and appeals ==
In a petition lodged in 2002, Keogh's legal team, led by Kevin Borick QC, provided material in support of a substantial number of complaints. Keogh's key complaint was against then chief forensic pathologist Colin Manock's handling of the autopsy on Cheney and his evidence in the trial.

South Australian Deputy Premier Kevin Foley said that after considering the report of the Solicitor General, delivered after an exhaustive examination over two and a half years of the 37 complaints contained in Keogh's third petition, he formed the opinion that it did not disclose any arguable basis on which the Supreme Court could find that there had been a miscarriage of justice.

In May 2007, Keogh applied for leave to appeal to the Supreme Court of South Australia. The appeal was dismissed on 22 June 2007.

On 16 November 2007, the High Court of Australia rejected Keogh's application for special leave to appeal against a decision by the South Australian Court of Criminal Appeal that it did not have jurisdiction to reopen his appeal.

On 4 February 2009, a fourth petition was lodged by Keogh with the Governor of South Australia. It alleged that his conviction was obtained by fraud, deceit and manifest error. The petition has been referred by the Governor to the Attorney-General of South Australia. Previously, the Attorney-General has stated that in the event of a further petition being lodged, he would ensure that it was assessed and determined by an Acting Attorney-General (not himself) in view of his published comments about Keogh's conviction.

== Complaints raised by the petitions ==
Keogh's defence team had raised a number of complaints concerning evidence that has come to light since Keogh's final appeal.

=== No presence of bruise ===
Manock, when photographing the body, saw what he believed to be four bruises on the left calf of Cheney, caused by what he believed to be a grip mark. When a sample was taken of the thumb bruise and examined for bruising, the result was negative. Despite this, this apparent bruise was used in Manock's proposed theory that Keogh had gripped Cheney's legs to hold her underwater in the bath, drowning her.

When asked about the age of the bruises during the trial, he responded: "I could find no evidence of white blood-cell migration into the areas and therefore, I felt they were peri-mortem. In other words, they’d occurred close to the time of death. I felt that was probably within 4 hours."

The prosecution stated during the trial: "But there are two things, you might think, that are crucial to this case. If those four bruises on her lower left leg were inflicted at the same time, and that time was just before she died in the bath, there is no other explanation for them, other than a grip. If it was a grip, it must have been the grip of the accused. If it was the grip of the accused, it must have been part of the act of murder."

Manock has since stated that the bruise could have occurred up to a number of days prior to Cheney's death.

=== Infeasibility of drowning scenario ===
The method of drowning proposed by Manock was not possible when the physical location of the bath against the wall was considered, requiring an attacker to be positioned where a wall was located. Manock did not visit the scene until three months after the drowning theory was proposed.

Maciej Henneberg, Professor of Anatomy at the University of Adelaide, South Australia, has stated that it would be impossible to drown someone by holding his or her legs over his or her head, as the power of the extensor muscles in a woman’s leg would always be greater than the power which a man could exert through a fingertip grip of the woman’s calf as proposed by Manock.

=== Lack of review of autopsy ===
Cheney's body was released for cremation on the same day that her death was considered a murder. The body was not examined by anybody other than Manock.

=== Lack of consideration of other possibilities by Manock ===
Manock stated at the committal hearing in Keogh’s case that: “I was at no time looking or thinking that the death was accidental because I could find no explanation as to why she would drown.” Photographs taken at the scene reportedly show marks and swelling which may indicate the possibility of a severe allergic reaction. Manock did not at any stage review the medical records of Cheney.

=== No control of scene of death ===
The scene of Cheney's death was not cordoned off nor controlled by police, and photos taken at the scene reportedly appear to show that Cheney's body had been 'tidied up'. Keogh's defence claim that this is evidence that the body was tampered with. Only three days following Cheney's death was the death considered suspicious.

== Successful appeal and release ==
On 20 December 2014, the conviction was quashed after the Full Court of the Court of Criminal Appeal set aside his conviction for murder. Keogh was released on bail on 22 December 2014. He was to be arraigned for retrial on 12 February 2015.

After initially announcing it would proceed with a retrial in early 2016, the DPP announced it would not be proceeding with a retrial at this time.
