= Ronnie Mutimusekwa =

Zimbabwean activist

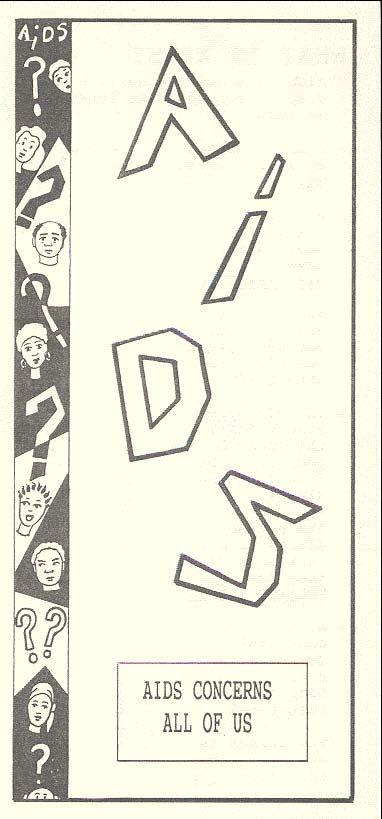
Leaflet (1991) produced by the Matabeleland AIDS Council

Ronnie Mutimusakwa (1955–1992) was the first AIDS activist in Zimbabwe, Africa.

== Headlines ==
Ronnie Mutimusakwa (birthname Rogers Mutimusakwa) was a Zimbabwean citizen who made international headlines in 1989 when he publicly revealed that he, a heterosexual man, was diagnosed with HIV/AIDS. His aim was to break the taboo surrounding AIDS, hoping that it would inspire others like him, as well as help in the prevention efforts. At the time it was wrongfully assumed that HIV/AIDS was a minor issue in Zimbabwe, confined to promiscuous homosexual men and female prostitutes.

== Education ==
Mutimusakwa worked tirelessly to promote awareness of the disease, telling his story at schools, churches and beerhalls. He formed a support group for people with AIDS, called Ihawu (Shield), of which he was chairman. Ihawu organized meetings in parks and factories where members tried to educate the public. Mutimusakwa received some funding from UNESCO and the Matabeleland AIDS Council to set up office in Bulawayo where he helped develop educational methods for AIDS prevention in rural areas, like community theatre. Mutimusakwa's story was also included in teaching materials abroad. Nearly all children in Zimbabwe are currently taught about HIV and AIDS in schools.

== Changing Attitudes ==
The publicity surrounding Mutimusakwa's confession set off a series of changes in the attitude towards HIV/AIDS in Zimbabwe, along with the appointment of Dr Timothy Stamps as minister, who took over the Health portfolio in 1990, and the news of vice-president Nkomo’s son Ernest Thuthani having died of the disease in 1996. The spread of the disease peaked in 1997 when more than a quarter of the population was estimated to be infected, after which this figure gradually declined to about 13% in 2017.

== Final Resting Place ==
Ronnie Mutimusakwa died on 13 July 1992 in Njube, a township of Bulawayo, and was buried in the village of Mutimusakwa in the Mhondoro area.

== Other notable AIDS activists in Zimbabwe ==
- Auxillia Chimusoro (1956-1998): The first woman to publicly announce being HIV-positive, also in 1989. Chimusoro became actively involved in the anti-AIDS struggle in 1992 when she formed support groups Batanai and ZNNP+. An annual award by the United States Agency for International Development (USAID) is named after her.
- Eliot Magunje (1965-2003): Zimbabwean actor whose HIV-positive status was accidentally revealed in Zimbabwe by CNN. Magunje decided to make the best of the situation and became information, education and communications officer of The centre, one of Zimbabwe's largest AIDS service organizations.
- Frenk Guni: Guni is a former coordinator of the ZNNP+ and a former executive board member for the National AIDS Council of Zimbabwe, living under political asylum in the United States since 2003. That year he received the Jonathan Mann Award for Health and Human Rights.
- Sunanda Ray: Sunanda Ray is a British doctor who founded the Women Aids Support Network (WASN) in November 1989. Dr Ray has been instrumental in the formation of many AIDS support groups for women, in the education on AIDS prevention methods and the assessment of major risk factors from a scientific point of view. Dr Ray co-founded several other organizations of which SAfAIDS won the Auxillia Chimusoro Award in 2002.
