= Cass Mann =

AIDS activist

Cass Mann (17 October 1948 – 18 April 2009) was an AIDS activist.

== Early life ==
Raised in India he moved to London during his mid-teens. He found the change of both schools and country very disorienting and unsettling. He also fell out with his father after he remarried and lived independently from his mid-teens. Through this experience he developed a tenacity that was evident throughout his life.

== Early AIDS activism ==
He formed Positively Healthy, which was the only charity for HIV positive gay men. He also campaigned against the use of the AIDS drug AZT, sometimes known as Retrovir, due to the toxicity at high doses. He used himself as an example of someone who can live a healthy life after testing positive and argued that the fact that he could live over twenty years without taking any drugs favoured a healthy lifestyle over medicine.

== Positively Healthy ==
Positively Healthy, founded by Cass Mann, was an organisation that provided advocacy for gay men infected with HIV and AIDS. Positively Healthy favoured a holistic approach encouraging a healthy lifestyle, vegetarian diet and nutritional supplements over medicine. Cass Mann also sold supplementary health products as an alternative to scientifically tested treatments provided by HIV health professionals.

== Deadly Counsels ==
His article, "Deadly Counsels: The Necrophiliacs of AIDS", was a chapter in the book edited by John Lauritsen and Ian Young: The AIDS Cult: Essays on the gay health crisis (1997). He wrote:

I declare that the greatest danger to people living with "HIV" and "AIDS" is the wholesale pollution of "AIDS" counselling by the death-promoting and life-negating philosophy of such counsellors as Kübler-Ross, whose disciples have been placed in practically all the major UK "AIDS" counselling agencies, with tragic consequences. When people come to them for advice, the Kübler-Ross counsellors tell them to prepare for their own imminent death, which, they unscientifically claim, inevitably follows a diagnosis of being HIV-antibody positive. …'Don't accept that having HIV or AIDS is a death sentence'; 'Question the medical knowledge and scientific accuracy of all AIDS data you have been presented with'; 'Find out what people living healthily with HIV/AIDS are doing with their lives'; 'Only have in your life that which supports and celebrates your aims and purposes, and detach immediately from everything that doesn't.' He concluded the essay by saying, 'for all those who have condemned us to die, the following message: LIVING IS THE BEST REVENGE!'

A year before his death Cass was commissioned by AIDS Videos to make a number of short films encapsulating Positively Healthy's message. The videos went live on YouTube in March 2008.

== Final years and death ==
Cass remained faithful to this ethos both in his work at Positively Healthy and in his own life. Following his HIV diagnosis in 1985, he lived a full and active life until his health began to decline 23 years later, reportedly from Hodgkin’s Lymphoma. As his health deteriorated he became increasingly private and isolated himself from everyone other than his closest friends. he died in 2009.
