= Marvelyn Brown =

American writer and activist

- Born: May 7, 1984 (age 42); Nashville, Tennessee
- Occupations: Writer and activist
- Website: www.marvelynbrown.com

Marvelyn Brown (born May 7, 1984) is an African-American author and AIDS activist. She is the founder of Marvelous Connections, an HIV/AIDS organization founded in 2006. She wrote the autobiography The Naked Truth: Young, Beautiful and (HIV) Positive, which tells her story as a young heterosexual woman living with HIV. She has delivered public speeches and made public appearances in the United States, Bermuda, Canada, Jamaica, Mexico, the Virgin Islands, South Africa, Tanzania, and Rwanda.

== Early life ==
Brown was born on May 7, 1984, in Nashville, Tennessee. She describes in her autobiography that she had regular clashes with her mother, but the two have since reconciled. She has two half-siblings with whom she keeps in contact, but has not actually met them in person due to them living across the country from her.

=== HIV diagnosis ===
Having little knowledge on HIV, Brown was unaware that the disease could be contracted through heterosexual sex. She was a healthy track and basketball athlete but began showing symptoms of an unknown illness that became critical enough to put her in an intensive-care unit. Doctors were unable to determine the cause of her illness, and Brown began to wonder if she had contracted HIV. She was diagnosed HIV-positive thereafter at the age of 19 in 2003, and discovered she had contracted the virus from her boyfriend at the time. In an interview with The Body, Brown stated "How did I not know that the virus was sexually transmitted? I felt I had been robbed by my community, my school and my church. The mantras I had heard over and over again growing up — 'Don't do drugs; don't get pregnant; don't smoke' — suddenly seemed so worthless. Never had someone mentioned the possibility of me, Marvelyn Brown, contracting HIV from unprotected sex. I had seen it as something only Africans or gay men got."

== HIV/AIDS activism ==
Her humanitarian work earned her a 2007 Emmy Award for Outstanding National PSA, and she won the Do Something Award in 2009. She was inducted into The Heroes In The Struggle Photo Exhibit by The Magic Johnson Foundation and The Black AIDS Institute in 2010 and named a Modern Day Black History month hero by BET and was honored by the New Jersey NETS in 2011. She has appeared on The Oprah Winfrey Show, America's Next Top Model, CNN, MTV, BET, and The Tavis Smiley Show. She has also appeared in Newsweek, Ebony, and Real Health magazines. Her public-service announcement for Think MTV won an Emmy Award. Brown was named one of the Top 25 Heroes of the past twenty-five years of the AIDS epidemic, alongside Alicia Keys, Magic Johnson and Phill Wilson. Her stories had been featured in British publications of Cosmopolitan, Glamour, Pride, and Fabulous Magazine and has been featured on the covers A&U, POZ, and The Ave.

=== Accusations of HIV/AIDS glorification ===
On October 3, 2008, Brown posted to her blog that she had been accused of glorifying her illness. "I am constantly being accused of glamorizing AIDS. Really? There is nothing glamorous about taking 7 horse pills that still make me gage [sic] after 4 1/2 years taking them. I contracted a 100% PREVENTABLE disease, people, which that is my message, not how glamorous I look doing it!"

Two days earlier, she elaborated on why she had written The naked Truth, adding, "I wrote The Naked Truth because I wanted people to get the full story and not a sound bite or the one-hour preping speaking engagement. Most people can’t identify with who I am now because I am HIV-Positive but they can identify with who I was before. That is what makes me relate and shows people that I am just like them. This virus is real and just because you are ignorant or uneducated about HIV that does not make you immune. That is why I wrote The Naked Truth. I can’t be everywhere but my story can."

=== 2010 press conference ===
On September 23, 2010, Brown held a press conference at the City College of New York. She educated attendees on the dangers of unsafe sex and HIV, for which she was required to accommodate to a new lifestyle. She shared that her medications often cause her to experience side effects, and recalled having to take forty-two pills in one day. However, she stated her average intake is eight pills a day. She commented that her illness is like “having a baby” to her because there's no vacation while taking medication. She openly stated she had previously wished to die, but after surviving a car accident is glad to have been given a "second chance", and says she has found God, to whom she gives thanks every day for still being alive today.

== Personal life ==
Brown continues to write and has dedicated her life to HIV/AIDS awareness. She has joked in the past that she will produce a sequel to The Naked Truth in the future, titled “The Naked Truth: Wife, Mother, and Still HIV Positive.” She lives in New York City, New York.
