= Aldyn Mckean =

American singer, actor, and LGBT activist (1948–1994)

Aldyn Mckean (August 7, 1948 - February 28, 1994) was a singer, actor and advocate for gay rights and the rights of people with AIDS.

== Early life ==
Aldyn Mckean was born John Baldwin McKean in Troy, Pennsylvania and raised in Lewiston, Idaho. He attended Harvard University, class 1970, where he performed with the university's Gilbert and Sullivan Players. At Harvard he joined the Students for a Democratic Society (SDS) and among other campaigns, he lobbied and obtained the elimination of the ROTC program and the establishment of the Department of African American Studies. After graduation in 1971 he served a tour of duty in Vietnam as an infiltrator of the SDS.

He moved to New York City to attend the Tisch School of the Arts at New York University graduating in 1975.

== Career ==
As an actor, Mckean appeared in the film Voices From the Front, a feature-length documentary on AIDS activism in America created by the video collective Testing the Limits, and in the Broadway production The Robber Bridegroom. He also appeared on television and radio programs like ABC's Nightline, CNN, and National Public Radio.

== Activism ==
McKean was a founding member of ACT UP in 1987. McKean was a frequent spokesman, representing the organization at international AIDS conferences (San Francisco in 1990, Florence in 1991, and Berlin in 1993) and on national television. He lobbied for: having clinical studies on long-term AIDS survivors, increasing availability of AIDS drugs, including people of color in AIDS drug trials, full participation of people with HIV and AIDS in international AIDS conferences.

In 1992, McKean was hired by the Gay Men's Health Crisis (GMHC) to work as the administrative coordinator for United for AIDS Action. After he was fired by GMHC, McKean went to work with the National Gay and Lesbian Task Force, Third Wave International, and other organizations devoted to economic and social justice and civil rights issues.

== Death ==
He died on February 28, 1994, at his home in Manhattan. The cause was AIDS-related complications, said Denny Lee, a spokesman for the AIDS protest group Act Up.

On March 4, 1994, a funeral procession across 14th Street to Union Square Park took place to honor Aldyn Mckean. They brought a sign reading: "A Great Hero In The Fight To End AIDS / Honor His Life -- Take Action"

== Legacy ==
Aldyn McKean papers (1974–1994) are hosted at the New York Public Library, Archives & Manuscripts.
