= José Gonzalez Espaliú =

Spanish performance artist and sculptor (1955–1993)

Pepe Espaliú
- Born: José Gonzalez Espaliú; October 26, 1955; Córdoba, Spain
- Died: November 2, 1993 (aged 38); Córdoba, Spain
- Cause of death: Complications from AIDS
- Notable work: "Carrying," "The Nest"

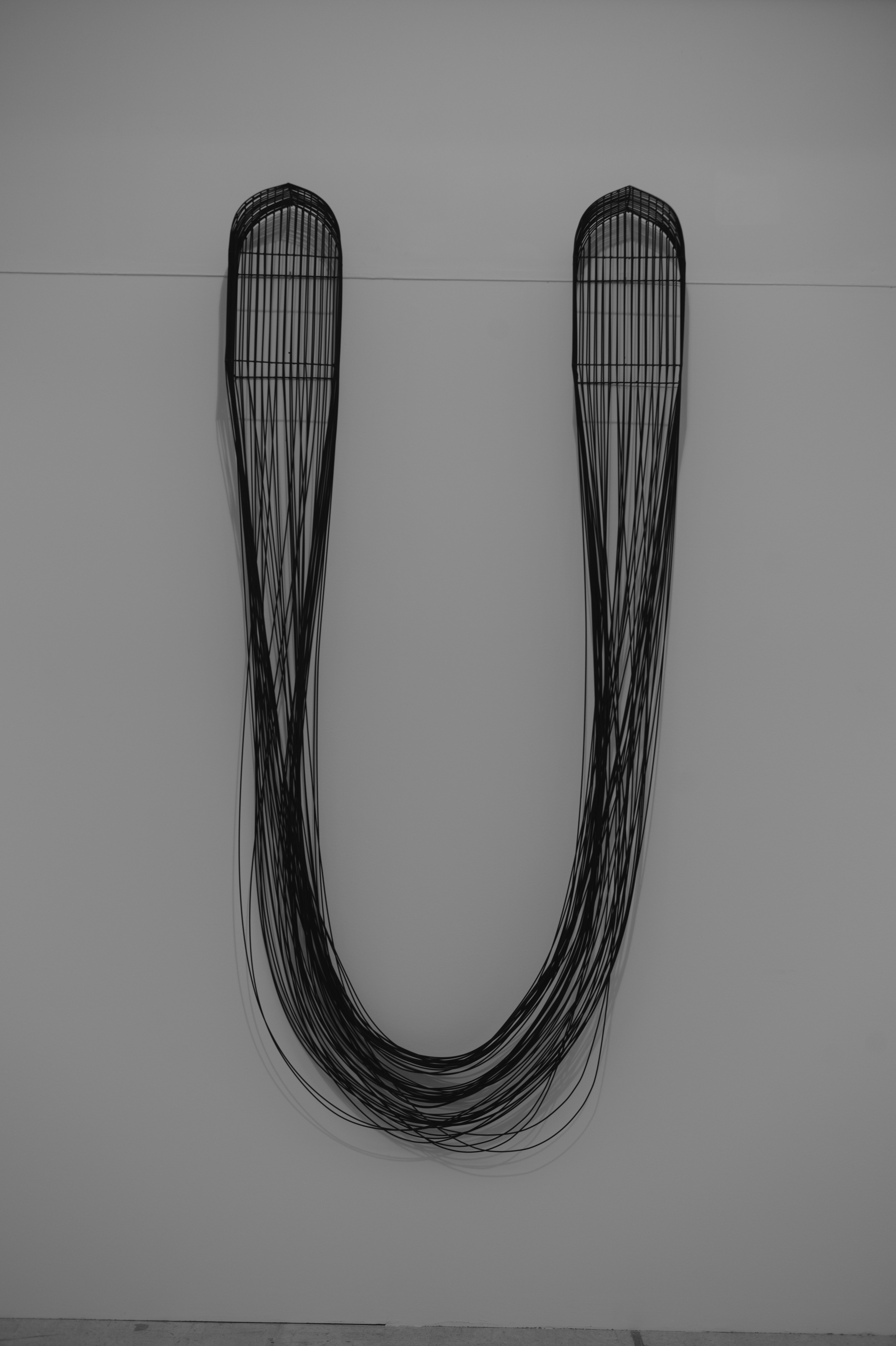
One of Espaliú's later works utilizing cages, a visual motif in the years leading up to his death.

José Gonzalez Espaliú (Pepe Espaliú) (October 26, 1955 – November 2, 1993) was a Spanish artist and activist, best known for his performative and conceptual pieces. He received an AIDS diagnosis in 1990, which influenced him to focus his art on the marginalization and suffering endured by himself and others with AIDS. Most notably, his performance pieces Carrying and The Nest and his news article "Retrato del artista desahuciado" sought to draw attention to the social and spiritual experiences of living with AIDS, from which he died in 1993. Since his Espaliú's death, his work has continued to be exhibited worldwide, including in his hometown of Córdoba in El Centro de Arte Pepe Espaliú (Pepe Espaliú Art Center).

== Biography ==
Espaliú was born in Córdoba, Spain on October 26, 1955. He created works as a painter, sculptor, illustrator, writer, and performance artist. His work was primarily conceptual in nature. Espaliú, a gay man, moved to Barcelona in the early 1970s at the tail-end of the dictatorship of Francisco Franco in search of a more welcoming social environment. Espaliú received an AIDS diagnosis in 1990, which eventually caused his death in Córdoba on November 3, 1993. He produced relatively little work due to his premature death.

=== Early life and education ===
Espaliú grew up in Córdoba, Spain. After the death of his mother when he was 13 years old, Espaliú became an orphan. Espaliú eventually went on to attend School of Fine Arts in Sevilla. There, he organized an exhibition of works by foreign artists at La maquina español. Espaliú then moved to Barcelona in the 1970s and started his own artistic career there. His relationships with the art scenes of Catalonia and Sevilla helped him become more established and refine his artistic style. Espaliú began to make conceptual art, which was highly-regarded in the Barcelona art scene at the time. In the late 1970s he moved to Paris, exposing him to international art. Accordingly, he was influenced by Lacan, Barthes, and Genet, as well as Rumi and San Juan de la Cruz.

=== Common artistic themes ===
Espaliú worked with a variety of media, mostly sculpture, painting, and public demonstration. By the beginning of the 80s, his art "became a complex territory of concealment and desire, where issues such as the body, identity, the double, illness, power, and death were progressively weaved together." Espaliú tended to draw on the emotionally-charged work of 13th-century Middle-Eastern poet Rumi, and especially on the sense of loss evoked in Rumi's works about the loss of Shams Tabrizi. Additionally, Espaliú's writing often referenced the idea that "the soul is the flesh". Common themes in his work were hollowness, concealment vs. exposure of self, the invocation of spirit, and the relationship between 'lacking,' prayer, and self.

Espaliú's art took a symbolic turn in 1990 when he learned that he had AIDS, and "through sculptures of cages and crutches, [Espaliú] referr[ed] to his condition and extrapolate[d] it into a shared universal order." He received his diagnosis during the peak of the AIDS epidemic in Spain, when the disease was at its most stigmatized. Thus, his work during this time was focused on the social marginalization and suffering endured by people with AIDS. Knowing that he only had so long left to live, Espaliú dedicated his art to increasing consciousness of and solidarity towards those suffering of the condition. His art at this time was described as "militant" and "angry", with a focus on "movement, impotence, and friendship." Espaliú died of complications related to AIDS at the age of 38 in 1993. His total body of work reconciled seemingly contradictory ideas: pleasure and duty, health and pain, personal and political.

== Notable works ==
=== Carrying ===
Carrying (1992) was Espaliú's most famous work. In this performance piece, Espaliú was barefoot, sitting on the arms of friends and supporters who took turns carrying him as if he was sitting in a chair. He was then transported: from the San Sebastian Film Festival headquarters to the San Sebastian town hall during the first iteration of the piece in San Sebastian, Spain and from the Parliament building to the Museo Nacional Centro de Arte Reina Sofía in the second iteration of the piece in Madrid. Espaliú's 'seat' made out of arms and hands resembled thrones used by royalty. Notably, his bare feet symbolized the exclusion and social contempt faced by those with AIDS in Spanish society. The emotional natures of both Espaliú's expression of pain and the audience's response put a spotlight on their shared humanity and the quickness to judge those with AIDS. Carrying also garnered massive amounts of publicity because, at the time, much of the general public still believed that AIDS could be spread by simple skin-to-skin contact. This demonstration drew attention to the fear it incited, and to misinformation on which that fear was founded. One newspaper recount even referred to Espaliú as making himself into a 'piety'. Carrying shares its name with an Espaliú sculpture. The iron sculpture depicts a rickshaw suspended in the air while embedded in a wall.

=== The Nest ===
El Nido/The Nest (1993) was Pepe Espaliú's final and "most personal" performance piece. The performance took place over the course of eight days on the grounds of the Museum Arnhem in the town of Arnhem, Netherlands. Each day, Espaliú, dressed in men's formalwear, climbed a ladder to an octagonal wooden platform elevated in a tree and walked in circles, methodically removing more and more clothing as he walked. On the final day of the performance, Espaliú undressed to complete nudity. The artist compared the emotional and spiritual elements of his physical performance to those of Sufi whirling: continuous circular motion with the aim to become "purer and emptier" and "closer to God" with each rotation. Publicly, El Nido was received as "a revelatory piece, simultaneously direct, sad, final, hopeful, witty and serious." On a metaphorical level, the piece was interpreted as an attempt by the artist to "[construct] a symbolic shelter" and enact the connections between "the carnal and the psychic, the interior and exterior." As with Carrying (see above), the performance El Nido shares its name with an Espaliú sculpture that is composed of eight crutches—an object that was a motif in Espaliú's final works—of different colors, all leaning on one another in order to remain standing.

=== Untitled (Three Cages) ===
Sin Título (Tres jaulas)/Untitled (Three Cages) (1992) is one of Espaliú's most renowned sculptures. Formerly displayed at the Hospital de la Venerable Orden III in Madrid, Untitled consists of a row of three cages hanging which, in lieu of solid bottoms, have wires extending in all directions. Aligned with the materials (cages, crutches) and themes of illness and friendship in Espaliú's later works, Untitled exemplifies how Espaliú, in the final years of his life, "[referred] to his condition and [extrapolated] it into a shared universal order."

=== Other thematically significant works ===
Espaliú's approach to expressing the experience of a body with AIDS has been described as "direct and cathartic" while still "opting for the universal." Curators of his work have noted that, much aligned with the discourse of the feminist movement that began a few decades earlier, Espaliú's art seeks to 'make the personal political.'

- Para asesinar una risa (1986) and La lealtad del verdugo (1986) are two examples of Espaliú paintings that feature the face and examine its role as "an expression of identity," a theme which, in addition to tortured identity and masking, the artist was known to explore.
- Sin Título/Untitled (1992) is a photograph of a public urinal building in Paris, around which his homosexual friends had gathered at his invitation. Below the photo is text in circular form that repeats "con o sin ti" ("with or without you").
- In Espaliú's final written piece, "Retrato del artista desahuciado" ("Portrait of a hopeless artist"), he discusses the discrimination faced by the gay community and those living with AIDS in Spain at the time of publication in 1992.

== Reception ==
=== Exhibitions ===
During Espaliú's lifetime, his work was exhibited throughout Spain, as well as in Paris, New York, and Amsterdam. In 1994, one year following Espaliú's death, the Museo Nacional Centro de Arte Reina Sofía held a retrospective homage exhibition featuring over 100 of his works produced from 1986 to 1993. Additionally during this year, the Mudéjar Pavilion in Sevilla held the first memorial exhibition for Espaliú.

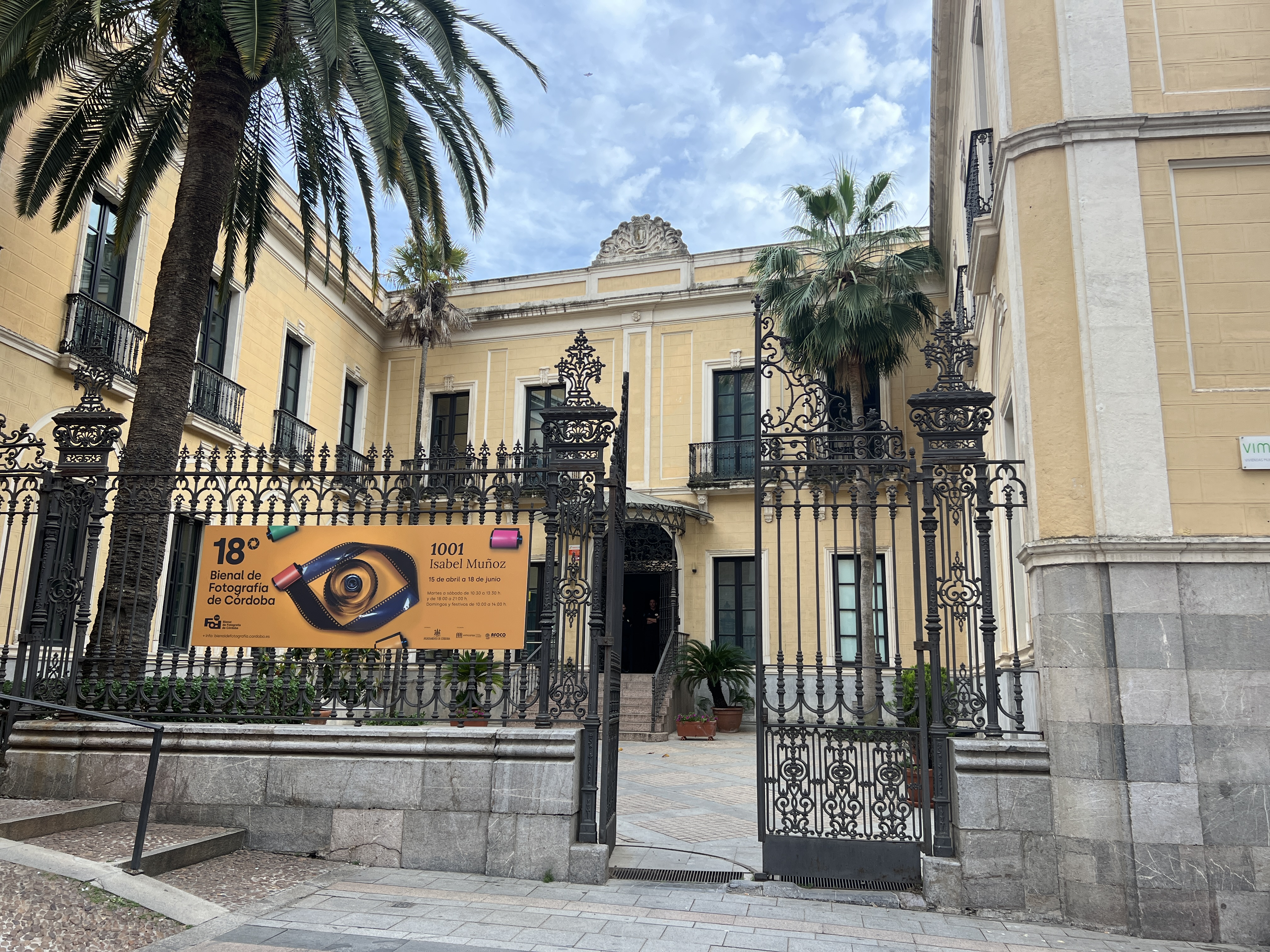
The Centro de Arte Pepe Espaliú (Pepe Espaliú Art Centre) in Córdoba, Spain

In October 2010, El Centro de Arte Pepe Espaliú opened in Córdoba in honor of its namesake. The refurbished house contains 32 pieces and 11 notebooks, many of which were sold to the museum by Espaliú's family at a low price in a collaborative effort to carry on his legacy.

In 2016, the Institut Valencià d'Art Modern (IVAM) opened an exhibit dedicated to the work of Espaliú, and in 2018, García Galería held an exhibition honoring the 25th anniversary of Espaliú's death, with the aim of "[introducing] his work to a new public." In the summer of 2023, the Cervantes Institute in Palermo held an exhibition of Espaliú's work.

=== Legacy of activism ===
Espaliú is known for openly speaking about his struggle with AIDS, and for "openly incorporating gay culture from the clandestine," choices that separated him from other artists of his time. During an era when shame and secrecy still surrounded AIDS in Spain, Espaliú brought humanity and visibility to the lived experience of the syndrome, and his body of work is regarded as "one of the most profound conceptualisations of living with AIDS." Even decades after his death, gallery curators that work with Espaliú's art still speak to his ability to express parts of the human experience that may typically go unseen.
