= Andre Chad Parenzee =

Andre Chad Parenzee (born c. 1971) is an HIV-positive Australian man convicted of three counts of endangering human life by exposing others to the risk of infection through unprotected sex as he claimed to them that he was HIV seronegative. In one instance he actually transmitted the virus.

Born in Cape Town, South Africa, Parenzee moved to Adelaide, Australia at the age of 15, becoming a chef and settling in Port Pirie. In January 2006, he was convicted on 3 counts of endangering life; the basis of the conviction was that he had unprotected sex with three women over a period of several years, despite being aware of the transmissibility of HIV, and had transmitted HIV to one of them.

In March 2006, Parenzee appealed his conviction, claiming that the existence and virulence of HIV have not been proven. He was supported by testimony from Valendar Turner and Eleni Papadopulos-Eleopulos, two AIDS denialists from The Perth Group who question the existence of HIV. A number of prominent researchers, including Robert Gallo, testified to the scientific consensus that HIV exists and causes AIDS. Ultimately, the judge rejected the qualifications and testimony of the AIDS dissident witnesses, finding that there is "no longer any genuine scientific dispute" that HIV exists and causes AIDS. Parenzee's appeal was denied. Parenzee's lawyer, Kevin Borick, stated that he planned to appeal to a three judge panel.

== Circumstances of the case ==
The first woman involved, known in court documents as "Ms KC", bore Parenzee two children (one in 1990 and one in 1994). Parenzee was diagnosed HIV positive on 21 September 1998; he married Ms KC on 7 November 1998, keeping his diagnosis from her, and continuing to have unprotected sex with her. They separated in 2000, at which time Parenzee began cohabiting with "Ms SMC", a mother of two, and having unprotected sexual intercourse with her. In July 2001 Parenzee was hospitalized with what he falsely claimed to be cancer, and Parenzee's sister informed Ms SMC that in fact, Parenzee was HIV positive. Ms SMC took an HIV test of her own at that time and was determined to be HIV positive on 20 July 2001.

Ms KC did not learn of Parenzee's diagnosis until 21 July 2003, at a hearing over access to their children. She testified that when confronted, he stated that he "did not give a shit about making [Ms SMC] ill."

The third victim, referred to as "Ms JB", had sexual intercourse with Parenzee from September to October 2004. Ms KC let her know that Parenzee was HIV positive by phone on 19 November 2004. Parenzee told her that was a lie; however JB confirmed it was true with Parenzee's mother, and by obtaining documentation from KC.

== Court proceedings ==
Parenzee's request to try the cases separately was denied. He was tried and convicted on 3 counts of endangering human life on 31 January 2006. His lawyers appealed the case to the Supreme Court of South Australia, claiming a miscarriage of justice, on the basis that there was no proof that HIV existed, could be sexually transmitted, caused AIDS, or could be tested for. At the hearing, the lawyers tried to present two members of the Perth Group, Eleni Papadopulos-Eleopulos and Valendar Francis Turner, as expert witnesses in support of their claims. David Albert Cooper, Martyn Andrew Haydon French, Elizabeth Mara Dax, Dominic Edmund Dwyer, David Llewellyn Gordon, John Martin Kaldor, Robert Gallo, and Peter James McDonald were expert witnesses testifying against the claims.

The presiding Justice John Sulan found that Papadopulos-Eleopulos lacked training and expertise in the field of biology, and had misrepresented the positions of others in her testimony. His finding was that:

Ms Papadopulos-Eleopulos has no formal qualifications in medicine, biology, virology, immunology, epidemiology or any other medical disciplines. She has never treated or been directly involved in clinical trials of any kind relating to any disease. Her duties at the Royal Perth Hospital are to test people for sensitivity to ultraviolet radiation.

She has not read or she has chosen to ignore an enormous volume of recently published material on the diagnosis and treatment of HIV/AIDS. She has been selective in the material upon which she relies.

Justice Sulan also found that "her qualifications do not provide her with the academic study required to give opinions on medical and scientific matters unrelated to nuclear physics." He further noted that she had no practical experience or formal qualifications in virology, epidemiology, electron microscopy, biology or immunology. The judge found that:

...she [Papdopulos-Eleopulos] is not qualified to express opinions about the existence of HIV, or whether it has been established that it causes AIDS. Nor has she expertise to express opinions about whether the virus is transmissible. Nor is she qualified to express opinions about the tests that have been developed to diagnose the virus.

Regarding the Perth Group, the judge found that the Perth Group will use whatever means available to promote debate, including encouragement of persons such as the applicant, to promote their theories in courts of law.

Regarding Dr. Turner, the judge found that his knowledge of the subject matter is limited to reading. "He has no formal qualifications to give expert opinions about the virus. He has no practical experience in the treatment of viral diseases. He has no practical experience in the disciplines of virology, immunology or epidemiology."

Despite the inadmissibility of Turner & Papadopulos-Eleopulos's testimony, the Judge chose to consider the claims of the defence that HIV did not exist, that it was not sexually transmissible, that it did not cause AIDS, and that tests for HIV were unreliable.

== Findings ==
The judge found that, contrary to Turner & Papadopulos-Eleopulos' assertions:

1. HIV has been isolated.
2. HIV exists and is identifiable.
3. There is no longer any genuine scientific dispute about that proposition.
4. Electron micrographs of HIV exist.
5. The genetic testing which has been developed is specific and accurate for the identification of HIV.
6. Endogenous retroviral sequences are distinguishable from HIV.
7. The method for testing for HIV is extremely rigorous and is highly specific and sensitive, and provides a scientific basis for establishing HIV infection.
8. Antibody tests which are used throughout the world accurately test for the virus HIV.
9. There is overwhelming evidence that HIV can be and is transmitted by sexual intercourse, including heterosexual contact.
10. HIV causes AIDS.
11. Though there is disagreement about the mechanism, HIV causes the depletion of CD4 cells and causes the breakdown of the immune system, resulting in the various diseases which are defined as AIDS-related diseases.

The judge also denied an extension of time to appeal on the basis that the woman who seroconverted after having sex with Parenzee might have contracted the virus elsewhere, citing studies demonstrating the similarities of the infective strains.

In September 2007, Parenzee was sentenced to nine years in prison. He will be eligible for parole in five years. The sentencing judge noted that, even at the time of sentencing, Parenzee had not yet come to terms with the damage he had wrought.

In September 2008, South Australia's Court of Criminal Appeal dismissed Parenzee's application for an extension of time to appeal and his application for leave to appeal, finding both applications incompetent. The finding was 2 to 1; the dissenter, Chief Justice John Doyle, said he would have granted leave to appeal, but would have rejected that final appeal anyway. An application to the High Court was expected; Parenzee was, with time off for good behaviour, eligible for parole in 2011.

== Imprisonment and compensation ==
Parenzee was admitted to the Royal Adelaide Hospital in 2011. He was shackled to his bed there for eighteen days. He sued the South Australian government and obtained an out-of-court settlement in 2016. Because the settlement was for more than the minimum $10,000, the payment was quarantined and Parenzee's victims were eligible to make first claims were they to pursue an action to recover compensation.
