= Veronica Geng =

American editor and writer (1941–1997)

Veronica Geng (January 10, 1941 – December 24, 1997) was an American humorist, critic, and magazine editor.

== Life ==
Geng was born in Atlanta, Georgia, raised in Philadelphia and attended the University of Pennsylvania. She died in New York City of brain cancer, aged 56.

== Literary career ==
Geng was an influential and acclaimed humorist who typically wrote short stories and essays. The Los Angeles Times called her "a brilliant contributor to The New Yorker and the quirky dark lady of Manhattan's literary scene, celebrated for her deadpan essays and revolving-door sex life." The New York Times said that Geng "carried on in the tradition of S.J. Perelman."

Starting in the early 1970s, Geng reviewed books for The New York Times for many years; during this time, she also wrote for the Village Voice. Her parody of The New Yorker's film critic Pauline Kael, published in The New York Review of Books in 1975, caught the eye of Roger Angell, a New Yorker fiction editor. (He later called Geng "the hardest person he ever had to edit.") Geng began writing for The New Yorker in 1976 and became an assistant fiction editor.

Geng's work typically included elements of satire and parody, with allusions to both high culture and popular culture. Critics praised her humor pieces for their unusual coupling of subjects and control of style, e.g., the Watergate Tapes reviewed by a hip Rolling Stone critic, or a sitcom about the young Henry James. "Her thing was high, intellectual comedy," noted Charles McGrath, another New Yorker editor. The writer Kurt Andersen said Geng's pieces "felt as if they were created in a laboratory or an institute for advanced studies.” The author Ben Yagoda, in About Town: The New Yorker and the World it Made, described her later writings as "subtle to the point of unintelligibility."

As a New Yorker editor, Geng worked closely with such writers as Philip Roth, Frederick Barthelme, Milan Kundera, William Trevor, James McCourt, and Ian Frazier. She developed a particularly close relationship with Roth, and was considered the unofficial editor of his novels. "I always gave Veronica my books," Roth said. He credited Geng with persuading William Shawn, the editor of The New Yorker, to publish his 1979 novella, The Ghost Writer, in two issues of the magazine. She remained at The New Yorker until 1992, leaving because of disagreements with the magazine's editor at the time, Tina Brown.

Geng was also a film reviewer in the 1970s and 1980s for The New Yorker, as well as Film Comment, American Film, Soho News, The New Republic and The New York Review of Books. She wrote approving essays about Monty Python in The New Yorker and The New Republic.

Geng touched upon feminist issues in pieces such as "Women in Science Fiction," for Bookletter, "Requiem for the Women's Movement," for Harper's and "Comment" on the Equal Rights Amendment" for The New Yorker.

== Family ==
In 2007, her brother, Steve Geng, published a memoir titled Thick as Thieves, which chronicled his relationship with his sister as well as his experiences of growing up as an army brat, drug addiction, time in jail, military experience, HIV and osteonecrosis.

== Bibliography ==
- Guess Who? A Cavalcade of Famous Americans, 1969
- In a Fit of Laughter: An Anthology of Modern Humor, 1969 (editor, with an introduction by Steve Allen)
- Cosmopolitan's Hangup Handbook, 1971 (editor, with Barbara Creaturo)
- Partners, 1984
- "For Immediate Release (a political statement hand-distributed on the sidewalk in front of The Russian Tea Room)". The New Yorker. 60 (47): 22–23. January 7, 1985.
- Love Trouble is My Business, 1988
- Summer, 1990 (contributor)
- Love Trouble: New and Collected Work, 1999 (published posthumously, collects the two previous books and adds previously uncollected work)
