= Victoria Arellano =

Mexican immigrant to the United States (1983–2007)

Victoria Arellano (October 10, 1983 – July 20, 2007) was a Mexican immigrant to the United States who died from complications of AIDS while in the custody of the Department of Immigration and Customs Enforcement (ICE). While officials from ICE have refused to comment on Arellano's death, advocates for immigrants, AIDS patients, and the LGBT community have decried the lack of provision of medical care as unjust and discriminatory.

== Detention and death ==
Victoria was born in Mexico and came to the United States as a child. She was a transgender woman who was categorized as male at birth.

After contracting HIV, she was prescribed bactrim, later switching to dapsone. Both medications were daily antibiotics. Three years prior to being detained, doctors at a Los Angeles free clinic described her as "asymptomatic". Her condition began deteriorating in May 2007, when, after being detected entering the country illegally for the second time, she was detained at a facility in San Pedro, California, she was denied her medication and medical attention.

Arellano was cared for by inmates at the facility, who took turns taking her to the bathroom and brought her cool towels. She was transported to the infirmary on July 13, 2007, and prescribed amoxicillin. She was unable to keep the drugs down and began vomiting blood.

Eighty detainees protested the denial of her treatment, chanting "Hospital" and ignoring an order to get in line for the night's head count. She was transported to a hospital in San Pedro, but was returned to the facility within twenty-four hours. Again, she was debilitated by vomiting and diarrhea, and again transported to the hospital, this time to the intensive care unit of Little Company of Mary Hospital in San Pedro. She was handcuffed to her bunk and her door was guarded by two immigration agents. She died on July 20, 2007.
