= Jesse Murry =

American artist (born 1948)

- Born: 1948; 78 years ago Fayetteville, North Carolina
- Died: January 13, 1993 (aged 44–45)
- Education: Sarah Lawrence College; Yale School of Art
- Known for: Painting

Jesse Murry (1948-1993) was an American painter and poet. Born in 1948 in Fayetteville, North Carolina, as a child he was forced to live with an aunt in New York, where he befriended Isabel Clark, a librarian at the White Plains library, who later adopted Murry.

After graduating high school, he attended Sarah Lawrence College, where he studied art and philosophy and went on to teach at Hobart and William Smith Colleges and work as a curator of work by artists such as Howard Finster. In 1984, at age thirty-five, he entered the MFA program at the Yale School of Art. He met artist Lisa Yuskavage on the day of his admissions interview. The two would be friends for the remainder of his life. After graduating from Yale, he moved to New York City, settling in the West Village with his partner George Centanni.

Murry died of AIDS-related illnesses in 1993. Critic Hilton Als has praised Murry for his "liquid awareness of how paint works on canvas, and how color and form can and should be handled delicately, and with respect." Murry's favored mediums were oil and beeswax.

== Exhibitions ==
=== Solo exhibitions ===
- Jesse Murry: Rising, David Zwirner, New York (2021)
- Jesse Murry: Radical Solitude, Tibor de Nagy, New York (2019)

== Publications ==
Painting Is a Supreme Fiction: Writings by Jesse Murry, 1980–1993. Edited by Jarrett Earnest. Published by Soberscove Press, 2021. ISBN 9781940190303
