= Stefano Castronovo =

Stefano Castronovo (born January 19, 1950) is an Italian-born artist. He is associated with the downtown New York art scene of the 1980s. His work combines elements of realism with a stylized, expressive approach and has been linked to Postminimalist. In addition to his canvas work and street art, Castronovo became known for his hand-painted portraits on leather jackets, depicting popular cultural figures.

== Early life and education ==
Castronovo was born and raised in Trieste, Italy. He demonstrated artistic ability at an early age and, at thirteen, was taken on by a mentor for private instruction. By fourteen, he had been accepted into a gallery in Trieste, where he exhibited alongside adult artists. He reportedly retired from formal exhibition at eighteen.

Following his early career in Italy, Castronovo traveled extensively throughout Europe, experimenting with drugs in cities such as Munich, Lisbon, and parts of Spain. He ceased drug use in the 1970s and subsequently moved to the United States, living first in New York and later in Los Angeles, where he resumed painting.

In November 1974, Castronovo presented an exhibition of three laser-lit holograms at the Cotichelli Gallery in Buffalo, New York, produced with access to equipment from the Electrical Engineering Department at the State University of Buffalo. Writing in The Buffalo News, art critic Jean Reeves described the works as "mysterious, illusionistic," adding that they were "almost like surrealistic paintings in three dimensions" and expressing a desire to see more of them by the artist.

During this period, he married a Chinese woman named Mee Din and they had a son, Ian. Castronovo and his family later returned to New York, where he became engaged with the downtown art scene of the late 1970s.

== Career in New York ==
In New York, Castronovo observed and responded to the anti-art tendencies of the late 1970s, a period marked by postminimalism and an emphasis on raw, unrefined aesthetics. His work developed in contrast to these tendencies, emphasizing technical skill and painterly control. His paintings have been described as realistic but distinct from photorealism, with particular attention to the rendering of skin and fabric. Castronovo has attributed his technique to sustained practice rather than formulaic methods.

In 1984, the Patricia Field boutique in the West Village commissioned Castronovo to paint a series of jackets featuring cultural figures such as Marilyn Monroe, James Dean, Darth Vader, Fidel Castro, Mao Zedong, and Grace Jones. Additional portraits he painted on leather include Marlon Brando, Elvis Presley, Sophia Loren, and Ronald Reagan. He produced custom jackets to order through the Patrick Fox Gallery in New York City, where he was identified as an emerging figure within the city's art scene. In an Artforum review of his exhibition at the Patrick Fox Gallery, Glenn O'Brien described him as "a maestro, an entertainer, and a whiz," emphasizing both his technical skill and his ability to balance wit with painterly sophistication.

By 1985, Castronovo was among SoHo's most sought-after painters, selling works for $3,000 to $4,000 to a clientele that included Andy Warhol and Keith Haring. Notably, he painted a portrait of Michael Jackson on brown leather for Haring. One jacket purchased by John Sex depicted the performer posing as Michelangelo's David. Warhol himself commissioned a self-portrait on leather, reflecting, as Castronovo noted, that "the idea of painting on a leather jacket is not very traditional. And Andy likes anything untraditional." Warhol also wore a Stefano jacket featuring a portrait of fellow artist Jean-Michel Basquiat on the back to the opening of their joint exhibition in September 1985. Castronovo also created reinterpretations of canonical works such as Sandro Botticelli's The Birth of Venus and Leonardo da Vinci's Mona Lisa, which he described as "a pop image" to which "everybody relates." Castronovo reportedly completed each jacket painting in about a week.

Initially created for friends, the jackets grew in demand, but resisting mass production, he declined to reproduce the designs through silkscreening. Instead, he told the New York Daily News in 1985 that increased prices to limit output and maintain exclusivity, charging $4,000 per jacket with clients supplying their own jackets. Just a few months prior, they were $1,000 to $1,500 if customers brought their own jackets, and $2,000 on jackets supplied by the artist.

Although his painted jackets proved his most commercially successful venture, Castronovo regarded murals as his preferred medium, describing them as "the most fun." He rejected seeking official permission for public works, arguing that "dealing with the red tape and all the city rules makes the painting become such an academic proposition," and added, "If I want a wall I'll find one and that's it." He also dismissed attempts to impose meaning on his work, stating, "People are always trying to pinpoint a message. And, really, there is none."

== Later career ==
Castronovo continued to exhibit internationally in the following decades and is currently based in berlin.
