= Richie McMullen =

Activist against male rape

Richie McMullen (c. 1943 – November 28, 1991) was an English author, youth counsellor and an advocate for social reform to address the rape of men and boys. He co-founded two support organizations for male rape victims and sex workers, and published four books, including an autobiographical novel Enchanted Boy (1989) and the academic study Male Rape (1990).

McMullen was born in a working-class Catholic neighbourhood of Liverpool, where he experienced physical abuse from his father from a young age. As a child and teenager, he was a rent boy, which enabled him to leave home and move to London at 15 in 1958. He also served in the U.K. Merchant Navy and the regular military, and worked as a student nurse in a mental hospital. McMullen earned a degree in counselling from Hatfield Polytechnic, and in 1972 helped open a youth hostel with The Centrepoint Project in Soho. He co-founded the organization Streetwise in 1985 to assist rent boys in London. In 1987 he also co-founded a support group for male victims of rape, named Survivors, which operated a helpline. At the time, English and Scottish law only criminalized the rape of women, not of men. McMullen organized the first U.K. conference on male sexual abuse. He tested positive for HIV in 1985, and was diagnosed with AIDS in 1987. After his diagnosis, he began to write, publishing Living With HIV in 1988, Enchanted Boy in 1989, its sequel Enchanted Youth in 1990, and the academic work Male Rape also in 1990. Male Rape was the first in-depth work published on the topic, and presented McMullen's research showing that most rape of men and boys was perpetrated by heterosexual men who were motivated by power more than sexual desire. McMullen died on November 28, 1991.
