= Steve Geng =

American writer (1943–2020)

Steve Geng (1943 – 2020) was a writer and the author of the memoir, Thick As Thieves. He also worked as an actor in theater and on the TV show Miami Vice.

== Life as recounted in memoir ==
Geng's memoir chronicles his relationship with his sister, Veronica Geng, a former writer and editor for The New Yorker. He recounts how in his early years he grew up as an army brat in a dysfunctional family in Philadelphia, Germany and France. He also writes about his love of jazz, decades of heroin addiction, numerous arrests (years in jail for crimes such as larceny), military experience during the Vietnam War (and being discharged for being psychologically unfit before his unit was sent to Vietnam), being diagnosed with HIV and osteonecrosis, and time in recovery.

Geng's memoir was reviewed in The New York Times, The Washington Post and the Los Angeles Times.
