= Teo Hernández =

Mexican filmmaker (1939–1992)

- Born: 1939; Ciudad Hidalgo, Michoacán
- Died: 1992 (aged 52–53)
- Citizenship: Mexico
- Education: National Autonomous University of Mexico
- Occupation: experimental filmmaker

Teo Hernández (1939–1992) was a Mexican experimental filmmaker.

== Early life ==
Hernández was born in 1939 in Ciudad Hidalgo, Michoacán. He studied architecture at the National Autonomous University of Mexico. He became involved with the cine-club culture in Mexico City. There, he founded the Centro Experimental de Cinematografia, which planned to produce a documentary. Hernández moved to Paris, France in 1966.

== Career ==
Hernández began to experiment with Super 8 filmmaking in the late 1960s. After meeting his partner Michel Nedjar, he spent time living in a commune and working in a textile shop owned by Nedjar's parents. He travelled throughout the world during the 1960s and started to experiment with film. He made his first feature film Salomé in 1976 and began to develop his unique visual style through volatile camera movements. Hernández's work explored interactions between the camera and body. His 1978 film Corps aboli, starring Gaël Badaud, marked a transition toward choreography in film, culminating in later collaborations with Bernardo Montet and Catherine Diverrès.

== Death ==
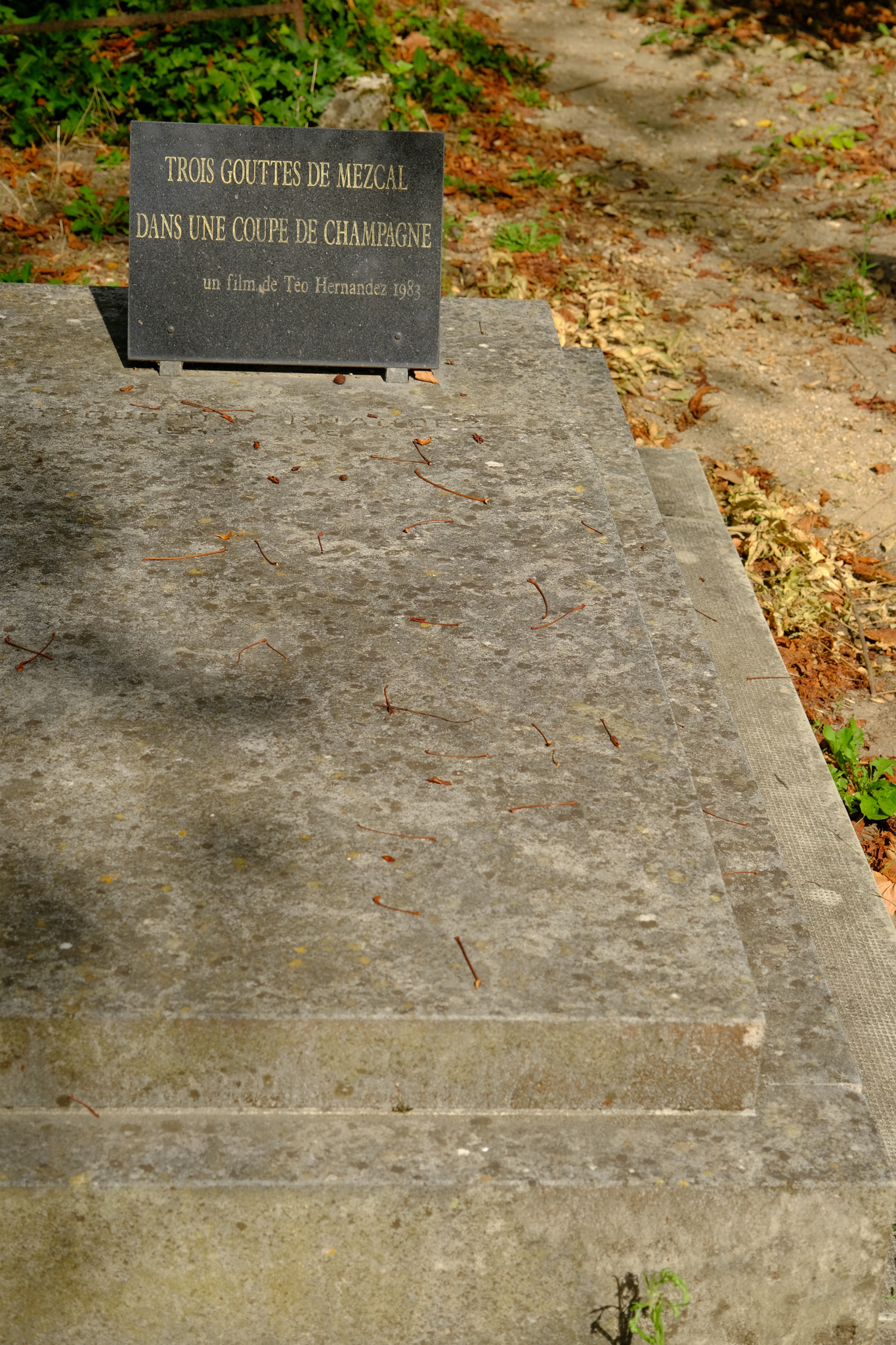
Hernández's grave at the Père Lachaise Cemetery in Paris

Hernández died from AIDS-related complications in 1992. His archive was inherited by Nedjar, who donated it to the Centre Pompidou. The Pompidou presented a retrospective of Hernández's films in 1997, and the Centro de la Imagen in Mexico held a retrospective in 2018.
