= Jorge Saavedra =

Mexican AIDS activist and director of CENSIDA

Jorge Saavedra López (born May 13, 1958) is a Mexican who was general director of the Centro Nacional para la Prevencion y el Control del VIH/SIDA (CENSIDA), an agency of the Mexican Ministry of Health. And since January 2018, he is the executive director of the AHF (AIDS Healthcare Foundation) Global Public Health Institute at the University of Miami.

Saavedra was born to a Mexican-American mother in the border town of Naco, Sonora. He has two master's degrees from the Harvard School of Public Health; one in public health and the other in health policy management. In 2000, he founded the first Ambulatory Care AIDS Clinic, Clinica Condesa, in Mexico City, which was to become Latin America's largest care center for HIV positive people. Two years later he was appointed director of CENSIDA, a government agency that works to prevent HIV transmission, to reduce the impact on individuals, families and society, and to coordinate institutional, inter-institutional, territorial and inter-sectorial responses to AIDS. During his time in CENSIDA he also developed an HIV care model called CAPASITS (Centro Ambulatorio de Prevencion y Atencion en SIDA e Infecciones de Transmision Sexual), there are more than 70 CAPASITS all over Mexico.

As an openly gay, HIV-positive man, Saavedra has campaigned against homophobia and other forms of discrimination. He has also lobbied for increased resources for HIV prevention and AIDS treatment and care in Mexico. He has criticized the U.S. PEPFAR initiative for canceling funding for NGOs working with groups at high risk of HIV infection.

In 2015, Saavedra was a member of the Harvard Global Health Institute-London School of Hygiene & Tropical Medicine Independent Panel on the Global Response to Ebola, chaired by Peter Piot.
