= Jahnabi Goswami =

Indian AIDS activist

- Born: 16 September 1976 (age 49) Nagaon, Assam India
- Occupation: HIV/AIDS activist

Jahnabi Goswami (born 16 September 1976) is an Indian HIV/AIDS activist from Assam. She is the first woman in the Northeast to declare her HIV status. She is the founder and current treasurer of Assam Network of Positive People (ANPP) and the current president of the Indian Network for People Living with HIV/AIDS (INP+), the first woman to hold the position.

== Early life ==
Jahnabi Goswami grew up in Kampur, Nagaon. Her father Hiranya Goswami was killed by ULFA militants in 1990. She was married off to a wealthy businessman at the age of 17 in the winter of 1994. Her husband died of AIDS in April 1996. Her husband had AIDS before marriage but this fact was concealed from Jahnabi. After the death of her husband, she was harassed, discriminated against and thrown out of her in-laws house and was not allowed to take her belongings and her daughter Kasturi with her. She got her belongings back and the custody of her daughter only after the intervention of the court and the police. Back in Nagaon, Jahnabi discovered that her husband had died of AIDS and that she too had been infected. Kasturi, who also had been infected, died in 1998 at the age of two.

== Work ==
After the death of her daughter, Goswami moved to Guwahati and joined the government-run Assam State AIDS Control Society (ASACS). In 2002, Jahnabhi Goswami formed the Assam Network of Positive People (ANPP) with the help of Manipur Network of Positive People. ANPP aimed at building the capacity and skills of people living with the virus and creating an enabling environment for them in society which if free from discrimination. ANPP has started a drop-in centre with free counseling and medicinal support to the patient and also provides referral services and free medical check-ups.

Goswami held the position of the President of ANPP and is currently its treasurer. She also held the position of the General Secretary of The Indian Network of Positive People (INP+), the largest Network of people living with HIV/AIDS and is currently the President. She is the first woman to be the President of INP+.

Goswami has also been involved in the politics of the region. In 2006, Jahnabi Goswami was expected to be the Congress party's candidate from the Barhampur assembly constituency in eastern Assam's Nagaon district against former Assam chief minister Prafulla Kumar Mahanta. But later her name was turned down. Jahnabi Goswami continued to campaign for the Congress party. She believes that through her active involvement in the election campaigns, not only can she help spread more awareness about the disease, but also make the people living with HIV/AIDS feel like they are an integral part of society.

Goswami's work mainly deals with women and children living with or affected by HIV/AIDS. In 2012, ANPP, jointly with ASACS opened the Kasturi Special Care Home in Guwahati which offers free shelter, food and education to orphans infected and affected with HIV/AIDS. She has also been campaigning to make pre-marital HIV/AIDS tests mandatory.

The life of Goswami was also featured in a 2008 short documentary, Jahnabi's World, directed by Debjani Mukherjee.

Goswami was awarded the IBN7 Zindagi LIVE Awards in 2011.
