= Gustavo Ojeda =

Cuban-American painter

Gustavo Ojeda (September 8, 1958 – August 23, 1989) was a Cuban-American painter.

== Biography ==
Born in Havana, Cuba, Ojeda emigrated with his family in 1967, first to Spain and then to the United States, eventually settling in Fairfax, Virginia. At 17, he moved to New York City to attend Parsons School of Design, where his teachers included the painters William Clutz and Kestutis Zapkus. Upon graduation, he was awarded a fellowship from the Cintas Foundation (see Oscar B. Cintas) allowing him to spend a year painting in Spain, an experience which, according to Ojeda, "served to get school out of my system." It was in Spain that Ojeda first began experimenting with nightscapes, a mode which would come to predominate his work throughout his short life.

After returning to New York, Ojeda mounted his first one-man show, "Works from Spain 1980," at the Seventeenth Street Gallery, garnering attention primarily in the downtown and Spanish-language art press. In 1981 he was awarded a Studio Fellowship at P.S. 1 (now MoMA PS1) in Long Island City, an award renewed in 1982, when he was also given a one-man show in the space's main gallery; it was titled "Night Paintings." That same year he had another one-man show of pastels on paper titled "An Intimate Look" in the Rotunda gallery of the Pan American Health Organization in Washington, DC, the small brochure for which boasted appreciations from the future head of Sotheby's Latin American art division, Giulio V. Blanc, and the Cuban poet and art critic Ricardo Pau-Llosa.

Over the next few years Ojeda appeared in numerous group exhibits across the United States, including New York, Los Angeles, Miami and Chicago. His association, however tangential, with the burgeoning East Village art scene of the early 80s even earned him attention in Europe, for example the "East Meets West" show of 'East' Village artists at the Zellermayer Galerie in Berlin, in what was still 'West' Germany.

This early success culminated in Ojeda's inclusion in "An International Survey of Recent Painting and Sculpture," a panoramic snapshot of global contemporary art mounted by MoMA in 1984 to celebrate its newly expanded facilities. Of the 165 artists from 17 countries included, only 23-year-old Jean-Michel Basquiat was younger than Ojeda, who was 25.

Ojeda spent the next year traveling in Spain and Mexico, and was preparing two one-man shows to be held in Soho and Los Angeles when his health began to fail him. In 1986 he was diagnosed with AIDS. That year his one-man show opened at the Michael Kohn Gallery in Los Angeles, followed in March, 1987, by one at the David Beitzel Gallery in New York. By that time AIDS-related Cytomegalovirus retinitis had begun robbing Ojeda of his eyesight. He died at New York University Medical Center in 1989, aged 30.

== Critical reviews/assessment ==
The Cuban-born art critic Ricardo Pau-Llosa was an early champion, writing: "Ojeda's works, from the onset of his arrival in professional art circles two years ago, possess an assured, subterranean, yet overpowering spirit of importance. His work is unsettling because, in some mysterious way, beneath the shell of what seems "safe" themes and subject matter, lies an instinctive and intuitive sense of art's most necessary function: the placing of craft at the service of altering our sense of the real. This Ojeda does without recourse to the cantankerous and gimmicky cult of pseudo-novelty which has characterized North American, and especially New York, art over the last few years. Ojeda does not seek to explode reality, to denote it with the flashy burden of art that is more junk than irreverence. Ojeda undermines, rather than ambushes, the boundaries of what we think of as real."

The poet and critic Gerrit Henry wrote: "Facility is buried in purity of vision; style is a means to a deeply poetic end. Ojeda's dexterity has an underlying depth that arises out of his search for meaning in the cold metropolis– a meaning that may only reveal itself for an instant, day or night. Ojeda seems to be on the spot whenever such a revelation occurs."

In 2020, a book of Ojeda's selected sketches was edited by Gabriel Ojeda-Sagué (Ojeda's nephew) and Erich Kessel and published by Soberscove Press. An Excess of Quiet: Selected Sketches by Gustavo Ojeda, 1979-1989 was chosen as a finalist for the Lambda Literary Award in LGBTQ Nonfiction in 2021.
