= Ray brothers =

American brothers infected with HIV

- Born: Richard Duane "Ricky" Ray; January 28, 1977; Robert David Ray; January 27, 1978; Randy Devone Ray; June 3, 1979; Arcadia, Florida, U.S.
- Died: December 13, 1992 (aged 15); October 20, 2000 (aged 22); May 18, 2023 (aged 43)

Richard Duane "Ricky" Ray (January 28, 1977 – December 13, 1992), Robert David Ray (January 27, 1978 – October 20, 2000), and Randy Devone Ray (June 3, 1979 – May 18, 2023) were three hemophiliac brothers who were diagnosed with HIV in 1986 due to HIV-infected infusions of Factor VIII. Their story, especially Ricky Ray's, gained nationwide attention and were seen as a crucial role in the fight against the HIV/AIDS epidemic.

== Biography ==
Ricky, Robert, and Randy were hemophiliacs who contracted HIV from infusions of Factor VIII when they were less than 8 years old. Born to Arcadia, Florida natives, Louise and Clifford Ray, the family was exiled from Arcadia as community members feared contracting the disease. Memorial Elementary School, in DeSoto County, would not allow them to attend school due to their diagnosis. In March 1987, they moved to Bay Minette, Alabama, to stay with Louise's mother. The brothers were enrolled in public school there, but their medical records were later revealed. They were put out of school again, and after six weeks, the family returned to Arcadia. As a compromise, the DeSoto County School Board offered the brothers a portable, self-contained classroom on campus away from other students. The family turned down the proposition, and in June 1987, they sued the school system, alleging wrongful segregation. A United States federal court ruled against the DeSoto County School Board and allowed the children to attend public school despite their diagnosis. The Rays were victorious in their legal battle, winning a $1.1 million settlement.

Following the court ruling, the Rays' home was burned down in less than a week, forcing the family to leave Arcadia. At the time of the fire, the family was staying with relatives at an undisclosed location. The cause of the fire was described as "suspicious", and the arsonist was never caught. After the arson, the Ray family settled in nearby Sarasota. The brothers attended Gocio Elementary School in spite of opposition from groups like Citizens Against AIDS.

Ricky Ray became an activist in the fight against stigma surrounding AIDS. In 1992, he allowed camera crews to document his declining health and stated he wanted to educate the public and raise awareness. U.S. President-elect Bill Clinton spoke to him and thanked him for his work raising awareness on AIDS. Ricky Ray died in 1992 at age 15. Prior to his death, at the age of 13, he made headlines when he planned to marry his 16-year-old girlfriend. Although his parents supported the decision, it was later postponed due to Ricky's illness. At the time of Ricky's death, they had broken up but remained close friends.

Robert died of AIDS-related causes in 2000 at the age of 22. Shortly thereafter, their father, Clifford Ray, attempted suicide but survived.

Randy Ray married in 2001 and lived in Orlando, Florida. He managed his HIV through medication. He died May 18, 2023.

== See also ==
- Contaminated hemophilia blood products
- Ryan White
