= Jonathan Wells (intelligent design advocate) =

American biologist and theologian (1942–2024)

- Wells in 2008
- Born: John Corrigan Wells; September 19, 1942; New York City, U.S.
- Died: September 19, 2024 (aged 82); Poulsbo, Washington, U.S.
- Known for: Advocacy of intelligent design

Education
- Education: Princeton University; University of California, Berkeley (BS, PhD); Unification Theological Seminary; Yale University (MA, PhD)
- Thesis: Charles Hodge's critique of Darwinism: The argument to design (1986)
- Doctoral advisor: David Kelsey
- Scientific career
- Fields: Molecular biology Cell biology
- Thesis: A confocal microscopy study of microtubule arrays involved in cortical rotation during the first cell cycle of Xenopus embryos (1994)
- Doctoral advisor: David B. Wake; John C. Gerhart

John Corrigan "Jonathan" Wells (September 19, 1942 – September 19, 2024) was an American molecular biologist, cell biologist, and theologian. He was an advocate of intelligent design, a pseudoscientific argument for the existence of God.

Wells joined the Unification Church of the United States in 1974. He earned a doctorate in religious studies from Yale University in 1986 and a second doctorate in molecular and cellular biology from the University of California, Berkeley, in 1994. He subsequently wrote that the teachings of Sun Myung Moon and his studies at Unification Theological Seminary convinced him to devote himself to "destroying Darwinism". He became a member of several scientific associations and published in academic journals.

In his book Icons of Evolution: Science or Myth? (2000), Wells argued that a number of examples used to illustrate biology textbooks were erroneous or exaggerated. Wells said that this shows that evolution conflicts with the evidence, and so argued against its teaching in public education. Some reviewers of Icons of Evolution have said that Wells misquoted experts cited as sources and took minor issues out of context, basing his argument on a flawed syllogism. Wells's views on evolution had been rejected by the scientific community.

== Early life and education ==
Wells was born on September 19, 1942, in New York City. He was the third child in a family of five children, and grew up in northern New Jersey. He was raised Presbyterian. In 1960, Wells graduated from Montclair High School. After high school, he received a full scholarship to attend Princeton University. As an undergraduate at Princeton, Wells majored in geology, but dropped out of the university in his junior year.

After attending the 1963 March on Washington, Wells became a pacifist and worked as a taxi driver in New York City. He was drafted into the U.S. Army and served two years of military service in Germany. After being discharged from the army in 1966, he enrolled at the University of California, Berkeley, where he led a protest against the Vietnam War draft at Sproul Plaza. He was arrested for draft dodging and incarcerated in solitary confinement for four months, then imprisoned for eight months at the U.S. Disciplinary Barracks in Fort Leavenworth.

Upon his release from prison, Wells re-enrolled at Berkeley and graduated with a Bachelor of Science in geology and physics with a minor in biology in 1970. He recalled that, as an undergraduate, "I became an agnostic and a Darwinist". After graduation, he lived in rural Mendocino County, where "I ceased being an agnostic and a Darwinist". He joined the Unification Church of the United States in 1974, then began attending the Unification Theological Seminary in 1976. While studying at Columbia University, he recalled that he "became convinced that the Darwinian mechanism of accidental mutations and natural selection is incapable of producing the changes required by evolution".

Wells graduated from seminary in 1978 and was awarded a scholarship to pursue doctoral studies at Yale University. He earned a Master of Arts from Yale in 1980 and his Ph.D. in religious studies from Yale in 1986. His doctoral dissertation at Yale, completed under theologian David Kelsey, was titled, "Charles Hodge's critique of Darwinism: The argument to design".

In 1994, Wells earned a second doctorate, a Ph.D. in molecular biology and cellular biology, from the University of California, Berkeley. His doctoral dissertation at Berkeley was titled, "A confocal microscopy study of microtubule arrays involved in cortical rotation during the first cell cycle of Xenopus embryos". Among his doctoral advisors at Berkeley was the herpetologist David B. Wake.

== Career ==
After receiving his second doctorate, Wells supervised a hospital laboratory in Fairfield, California, from 1994 to 1998. Concurrently, he was a postdoctoral researcher in molecular and cellular biology at Berkeley from 1995 to 1998, during which time he wrote articles critical of Darwinism.

In 1996, Wells started working for the Center for Science and Culture (then the Center for the Renewal of Science and Culture) at the Discovery Institute, a conservative evangelical think tank, where he was appointed the Karl Ernst von Baer Fellow in Developmental and Evolutionary Biology. He served as one of the associate editors of the Origins & Design intelligent design journal, along with William A. Dembski and Stephen C. Meyer. He also worked at the International Society for Complexity, Information, and Design, which also promoted intelligent design.

Wells had written on the subject of marriage within the Unification Church, and had been called a "Unification Church marriage expert" by church sources. Wells defended Unification Church theology against what he said were unfair criticisms of it made in 1977 by the National Council of Churches.

Wells appeared on a panel at Harvard with Stephen Palumbi in November 2001, which his supporters lauded as a "home run". Other observers stated that Wells' performance was "uneventful".

== Opposition to Darwinian evolution ==
Of his student days at Unification Theological Seminary (1976–78), Wells said, "One of the things that Father [Reverend Sun Myung Moon] advised us to do at UTS was to pray to seek God's plan for our lives." Wells later described that plan: "To defend and articulate Unification theology especially in relation to Darwinian evolution."

Wells stated that his religious doctoral studies at Yale, which were paid for by the Unification Church, focused on the "root of the conflict between Darwinian evolution and Christian doctrine" and encompassed the whole of Christian theology within a focus of Darwinian controversies. He said:

...I learned (to my surprise) that biblical chronology played almost no role in the 19th- century controversies, since most theologians had already accepted geological evidence for the age of the earth and re-interpreted the days in Genesis as long periods of time. Instead, the central issue was design.

Wells said that "destroying Darwinism" was his motive for studying Christian theology at Yale and going on to seek his second PhD at Berkeley, studying biology and in particular embryology:

Father's [Rev. Moon's] words, my studies, and my prayers convinced me that I should devote my life to destroying Darwinism, just as many of my fellow Unificationists had already devoted their lives to destroying Marxism. When Father chose me (along with about a dozen other seminary graduates) to enter a Ph.D. program in 1978, I welcomed the opportunity to prepare myself for battle.

Wells's statement and others like it are viewed by the scientific community as evidence that Wells lacks proper scientific objectivity and mischaracterizes evolution by ignoring and misrepresenting the evidence supporting it while pursuing an agenda promoting notions supporting his religious beliefs in its place. In 2011, Wells responded in Science and Culture Today:

Since then, many of my critics have quoted the now-infamous line, "Father's words, my studies, and my prayers convinced me that I should devote my life to destroying Darwinism." (For a sampling, just do a Google search on the words.) Remarkably, Darwinists never quote much else from my essay, even though the 18 words in this one line represent only 1% of it, while a subsequent passage dealing with my scientific reasons for rejecting Darwinism represents 37%. Talk about quote mining...

Nor (as far as I know) have any Darwinists bothered to learn anything about the context in which I wrote the essay. If they had, they would know that Reverend Moon did not instruct or command me to destroy Darwinism (though years later he commended me on publishing Icons of Evolution.)

So, can I be trusted to say anything concerning the biological sciences? I freely admit that I was motivated to pursue a biology Ph.D., in part, because of my religious views. On the other hand, Francis Crick freely admitted (to historian Horace Freeland Judson) that he went into biology, in part, because of his atheistic views. What ultimately mattered in Crick's case was not his motivation, but whether his biological claims were consistent with the evidence. The same is true in my case.

He wrote articles for the Discovery Institute, WorldNetDaily, Origins & Design, and other sympathetic publications attacking evolution and defending intelligent design. In 1997, he presented a paper titled "Evolution by Design" at the Unification Church sponsored International Conference on the Unity of the Sciences in Washington, D.C.

In 1999, Wells debated with the New Mexicans for Science and Reason. He was one of the contributors to Natural History magazine's 2002 debate between intelligent design advocates and evolution supporters. In 2005, he debated Massimo Pigliucci on the PBS talk show Uncommon Knowledge. Pigliucci said that Wells "clearly lied" during his debates and misrepresented his agenda and science, as well as not understanding some of the theories he tried to attack.

Wells was one of the signatories of the Discovery Institute's "A Scientific Dissent From Darwinism," a petition which the intelligent design movement uses to promote intelligent design by attempting to cast doubt on evolution. He is also the author of "Ten questions to ask your biology teacher about evolution" for high school students, which is published by the Discovery Institute. The National Center for Science Education has issued a list of answers to the questions.

=== Icons of Evolution ===
In 2000 Wells published his book Icons of Evolution, in which he discusses 10 examples which he says show that many of the most commonly accepted arguments supporting evolution are invalid.

According to Barbara Forrest and Paul R. Gross, twelve reviews of Wells' book by subject matter experts from 2000 to 2004 came to the consensus that "Wells's icons are nothing more than the making—for politico-religious purposes—of an enormous mountain from a scattering of molehills". Scholars quoted in the work have accused Wells of purposely misquoting them and misleading readers. Biologist and skeptic Jerry Coyne wrote of Icons, "Wells's book rests entirely on a flawed syllogism: ... textbooks illustrate evolution with examples; these examples are sometimes presented in incorrect or misleading ways; therefore evolution is a fiction."

=== Kansas evolution hearings ===
In 2005, Wells participated in the Kansas evolution hearings, which were boycotted by mainstream scientists. There Wells testified:

I became convinced that the Darwinian theory is false because it conflicts with the evidence. ... I think the earth is probably four-and-a-half billion or so years old. But I'll tell you this, I used to-- I would have said, a few years ago, I'm convinced it's four-and-a-half billion years old. But the truth is I have not looked at the evidence. And I have become increasingly suspicious of the evidence that is presented to me and that's why at this point I would say probably it's four-and-a-half billion years old, but I haven't looked at the evidence. ... There are already scientists-- respected scientists in this country who do experiments on things that most people consider supernatural, such as prayer. When Newton proposed the theory of gravitation it was dismissed as supernaturalism because it was action at a distance. What constitutes supernaturalism in today's science may very well not be supernatural in tomorrow's science.

Prior to the evolution hearings, in December 2000 after the Pratt County, Kansas, school board revised its tenth-grade biology curriculum at the urging of intelligent design proponents to include material that encourages students to question the theory of evolution, The Pratt Tribune published a letter from Jerry Coyne challenging Wells's characterization in an article of his work on peppered moths, saying that his article appended to the Pratt standards was misused and being mischaracterized:

Creationists such as Jonathan Wells claim that my criticism of these experiments casts strong doubt on Darwinism. But this characterization is false. ... My call for additional research on the moths has been wrongly characterized by creationists as revealing some fatal flaw in the theory of evolution. ... It is a classic creationist tactic (as exemplified in Wells' book, "Icons of Evolution") to assert that healthy scientific debate is really a sign that evolutionists are either committing fraud or buttressing a crumbling theory.

=== The Politically Incorrect Guide to Darwinism and Intelligent Design ===
In 2006, Wells published his second major book, The Politically Incorrect Guide to Darwinism and Intelligent Design, which was part of a series published by Regnery Publishing. The book was praised by Tom Bethell, author of The Politically Incorrect Guide to Science (2005), but was described by Reed A. Cartwright of The Panda's Thumb weblog as being "not only politically incorrect but incorrect in most other ways as well: scientifically, logically, historically, legally, academically, and morally." Cartwright also edited a chapter-by-chapter critique of the book. A quote from the book linking evolution to eugenics, abortion and racism appeared on Starbucks paper cups in 2007.

== HIV/AIDS denialism ==
In 1991, Wells and his mentor Phillip E. Johnson signed an open letter which said in full:

It is widely believed by the general public that a retrovirus called HIV causes the group [of] diseases called AIDS. Many biochemical scientists now question this hypothesis. We propose that a thorough reappraisal of the existing evidence for and against this hypothesis be conducted by a suitable independent group. We further propose that critical epidemiological studies be devised and undertaken.

Wells and Johnson have been criticized, along with others, for their questioning of the scientific and medical consensus that HIV causes AIDS. In the Washington University Law Review, Matthew J. Brauer, Barbara Forrest, and Steven G. Gey faulted Wells, Johnson, and others for denying the HIV/AIDS connection and promoting denialism via a petition which did not have any scientific support.

== Personal life ==
Wells had two children—Josie and Peter—with his wife, Lucy. He died on September 19, 2024 (his 82nd birthday), at his home in Washington.

== Publications ==
=== Articles in peer-reviewed journals ===
- Wells, Jonathan (1985). "Inertial force as a possible factor in mitosis". BioSystems. 17 (4): 301–315. Bibcode:1985BiSys..17..301W. doi:10.1016/0303-2647(85)90046-2. ISSN 0303-2647. PMID 3902112.
- Larabell, Carolyn A.; Rowning, Brian A.; Wells, Jonathan; Wu, Mike; Gerhart, John C. (April 1996). "Confocal microscopy analysis of living Xenopus eggs and the mechanism of cortical rotation" (PDF). Development. 122 (4): 1281–1289. doi:10.1242/dev.122.4.1281. OCLC 15088415. PMID 8620855.
- Rowning, Brian A.; Wells, Jonathan; Wu, Mike; Gerhart, John C.; Moon, Randall T.; Larabell, Carolyn A. (February 18, 1997). "Microtubule-mediated transport of organelles and localization of β-catenin to the future dorsal side of Xenopus eggs". Proceedings of the National Academy of Sciences of the United States of America. 94 (4): 1224–1229. Bibcode:1997PNAS...94.1224R. doi:10.1073/pnas.94.4.1224. ISSN 0027-8424. PMC 19772. PMID 9037034.

=== Books ===
- Wells, Jonathan (1988). Charles Hodges' Critique of Darwinism: An Historical-Critical Analysis of Concepts Basic to the 19th Century Debate. illustrations by Jody F. Sjogren. Lewiston, NY: Edwin Mellen Press. ISBN 978-0-88946-671-5. LCCN 87031222. OCLC 16924943.
- —— (2000). Icons of Evolution: Science or Myth?: Why Much of What We Teach About Evolution is Wrong. Washington, D.C.: Regnery Publishing. ISBN 978-0-89526-276-9. LCCN 00062544. OCLC 44768911.
- —— (2006). The Politically Incorrect Guide to Darwinism and Intelligent Design. Washington, D.C.: Regnery Publishing. ISBN 978-1-596-98013-6. LCCN 2008270992. OCLC 70870578.
- Dembski, William A.; Wells, Jonathan (2008). How to be an Intellectually Fulfilled Atheist (or not) (1st ed.). Wilmington, DE: ISI Books. ISBN 978-1-933-85984-2. LCCN 2008934995. OCLC 232128215.
- ——; —— (2008). Dembski, William A. (ed.). The Design of Life: Discovering Signs of Intelligence in Biological Systems. Dallas, TX: Foundation for Thought and Ethics. ISBN 978-0-980-02130-1. LCCN 2009281462. OCLC 183624199.
- Wells, Jonathan (2011). The Myth of Junk DNA (1st ed.). Seattle, WA: Discovery Institute Press. ISBN 978-1-936-59900-4. LCCN 2011925471. OCLC 739090951.

=== Dissertations ===
Wells, John Corrigan. 1986. CHARLES HODGE'S CRITIQUE OF DARWINISM: THE ARGUMENT TO DESIGN (EVOLUTION, THEOLOGY). Ph.D. Dissertation, Yale University, 265 pages.

Wells, John Corrigan. 1994. A confocal microscopy study of microtubule arrays involved in cortical rotation during the first cell cycle of Xenopus embryos. Ph.D. Dissertation, University of California, Berkeley, 124 pages.

== See also ==
- List of Unification movement people
- Neo-creationism
- Unification Church
- Unification Church and science
- Unification Church of the United States
