= Charles Kazilek =

Science communicator, educator, and artist

Charles J Kazilek III
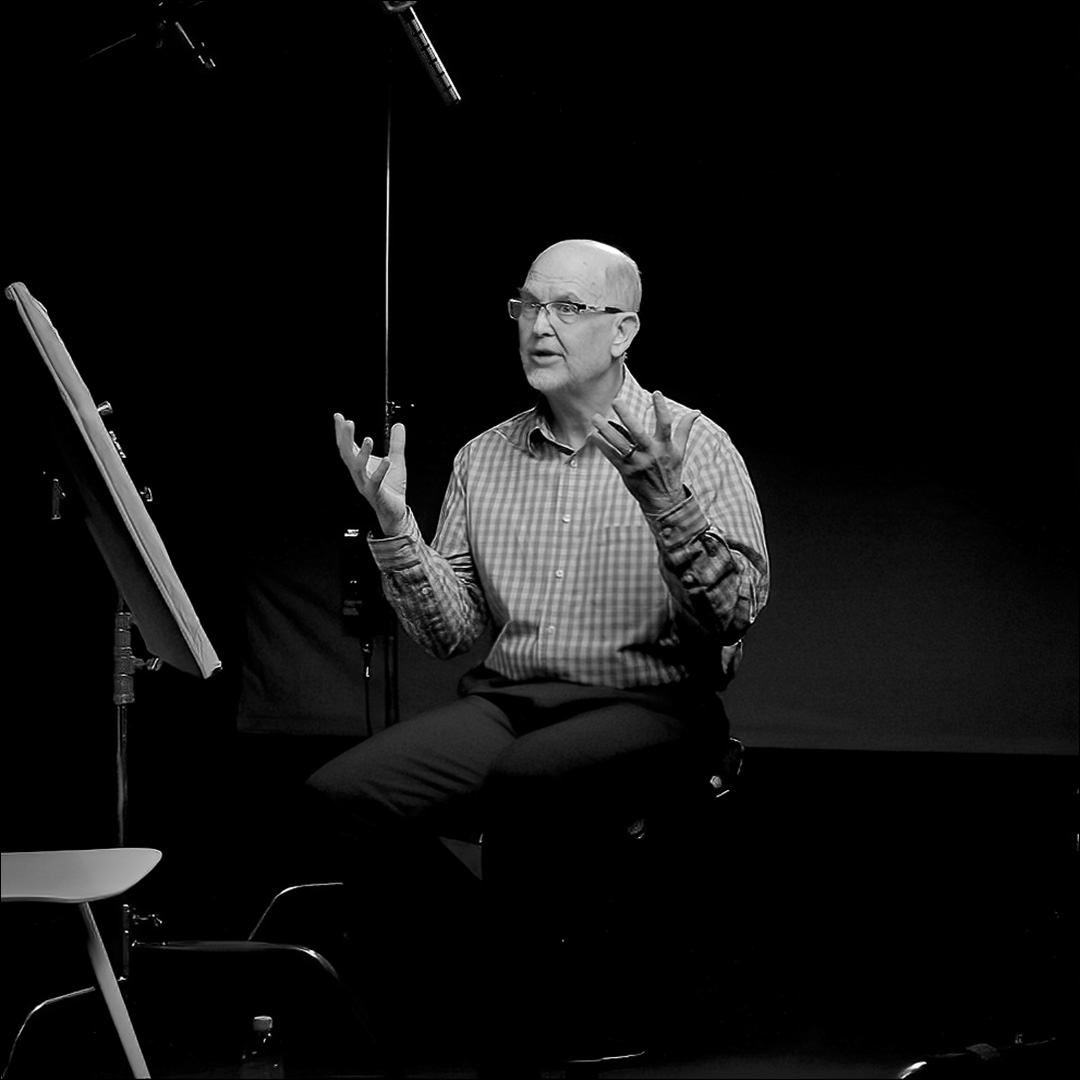
- Charles Kazilek during a video recording session at the ASU MIX Center.
- Born: Charles J. Kazilek III; 1 June 1958 (age 68); Sioux City, Iowa, US
- Education: Arizona State University ( B.F.A.); Arizona State University Master of Natural Sciences (M.N.S).
- Known for: Ask A Biologist, Paper Project
- Spouse: Sally Kazilek

Charles J. Kazilek III (born 1 June 1958) is an American-born science communicator, educator, and artist. His K-12 outreach work involves the globally successful Ask A Biologist website, which he founded in 1997. Kazilek is also an artist who works in both the real and virtual worlds of visual arts. His art has been inspired by his background in microscopy and includes the Paper Project, Scanning Light Photomacrography, and his novel approach to illustrating insects which includes two field guides on tiger beetles.

== Art + technology ==
=== The Paper Project and early Virtual Reality work ===
In 1999, Kazilek began a collaboration with Gene Valentine (b: July 29, 1938 | d: February 22, 2022) and later Jennifer Tsukiama that became the Paper Project. The project combined science and art and would ultimately produce printed canvas works, 3-D anaglyph work, a 3-D dance performance, and a room installation that allowed visitors to explore the three-dimensional structure of historic and contemporary handmade paper. The experience provided an early form of virtual reality VR. The final canvases were displayed at the Paper Discovery Center in Appleton, Wisconsin, the Arizona Science Center, the Dard Hunter Studio in Utah, and Arizona State University. The performance was part of the American College Dance Festival in 2002. Some of Kazilek's microscopy images from the Paper Project have also been featured in Nikon Small World (2004, 2006, 2008, and 2017) and in one instance (2004) displayed on Times Square to start the year-long traveling tour.

=== Digital Watercolors ===
Among the works in Kazilek's artistic portfolio is a piece created in 2008, based on a newly discovered whirligig beetle named after singer Roy Orbison, Orectochilus orbisonorum. Kazilek created a commemorative digital watercolor presentation piece titled "Whirligig" that featured nine images of the beetle in the style of Andy Warhol.

== Science education and communication ==
In 1997, Kazilek launched the Ask A Biologist website. What began as a single webpage that partnered questions submitted by K-12 students with answers from university biology professors and graduate students, now offers more than 4,000 pages of multimedia content. Accessed by millions annually, Ask A Biologist offers students, teachers, and life-long learners biology learning materials that range from stories, activities, games, gamelets (short-play games), escape room experiences, and videos to podcasts.

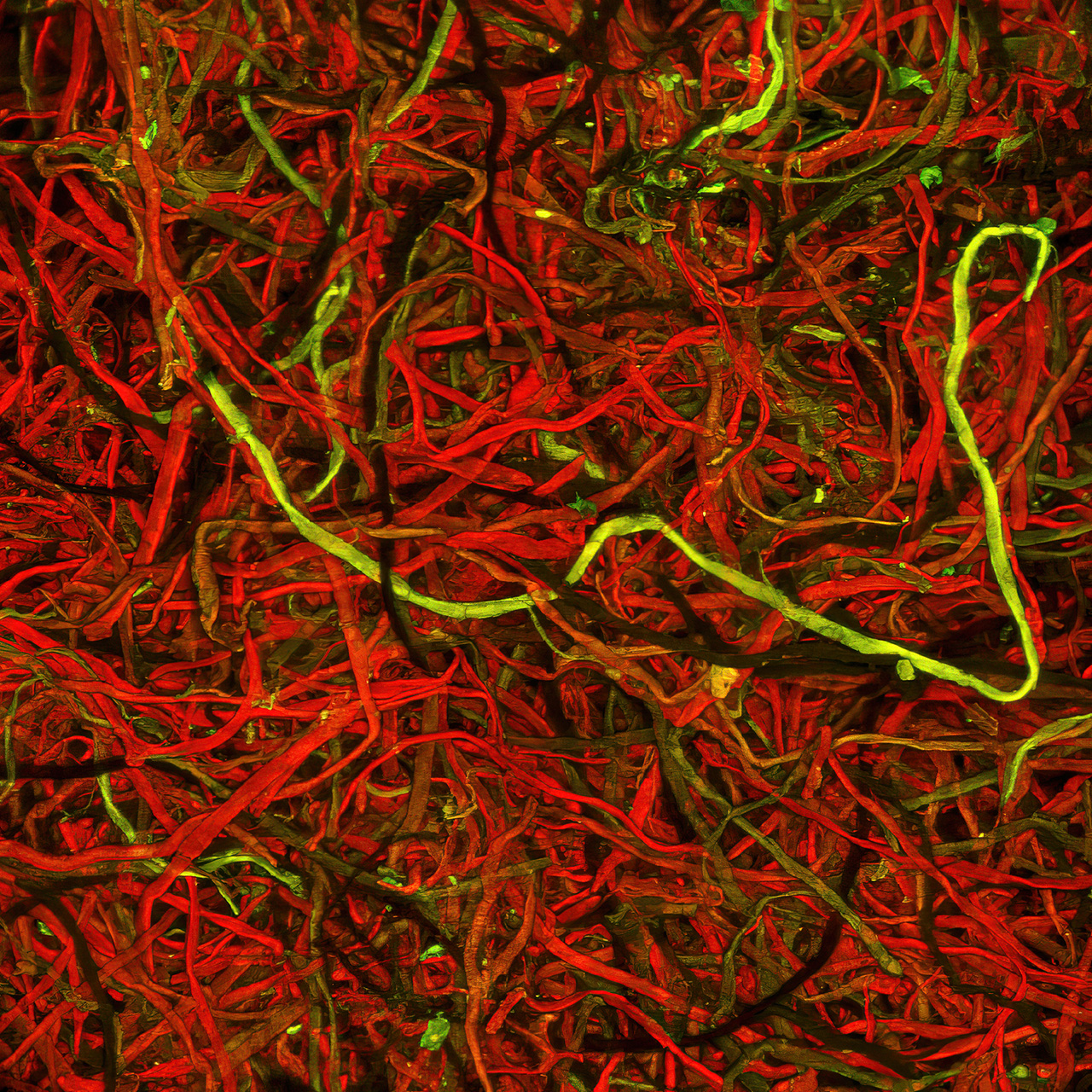
Silk handmade-paper imaged using a scanning laser confocal microscope.

One particularly unique feature of the website is the collection of 360-degree experiences and their related content. These virtual tours make use of VR photography allowing visitors to explore many of the biomes of the world using a desktop, laptop, or mobile device including phones.

=== Puzzle and game-based learning ===
An educational escape room is based on earlier escape room video games and is a style of puzzle-based learning that is well suited for web-based games, which also provide access to a larger audience. In 2012, the Ask A Biologist website trialed this by building "Science Detectives: Training Room Escape," a click-through online escape room for preK-12 learners that combined fun with using the scientific method to succeed. Kazilek sees escape rooms as a natural problem-solving environment. The game has been played more than 170,000 times, and one student commented, "It's okay to trick us into learning."

== Awards ==
- Science Prize for Online Resources in Education (SPORE) – 2010 American Association for the Advancement of Science (AAAS).
- Donald J. Nash Memorial Award, 2006 American Association for the Advancement of Science (AAAS), Southwestern and Rocky Mountain Division (SWARM)
- 2005 Classics Award Winner for Teacher Education. Multimedia Educational Resources for Learning and Online Teaching (MERLOT).

== Publications ==
=== Books and book chapters ===
- Chandler, Douglas E.; Merkle, Carrie J.; Kazilek, Charles J. (1989). "Detection of Calcium Signals in Neutrophils Using Fluorescent Dyes". Luminescence Applications. ACS Symposium Series. Vol. 383. American Chemical Society. pp. 70–83. doi:10.1021/bk-1989-0383.ch005. ISBN 978-0-8412-1560-3.
- Peter Gentenaar, Gangolf Ulbricht, John Risseeuw, Gene Valentine, Charles Kazilek. 2002. Timeless Paper. Compress Bv, Paperback, 240 pp. ISBN 90-73803-03-9
- David L. Pearson, C. Barry Knisley, Charles J. Kazilek. 2006 Field Guide to the Tiger Beetles of the United States and Canada. Identification, Natural History, and Distribution of the Cicindelidae. Oxford University Press. 292 pp. ISBN 0-19-518156-5
- David L. Pearson, C. Barry Knisley, Charles J. Kazilek, Daniel Paul Duran. 2015. Field Guide to the Tiger Beetles of the United States and Canada (2nd Edition) Identification, Natural History, and Distribution of the Cicindelidae. Oxford University Press. 232 pp. ISBN 0-19-936718-3

=== Science manuals ===
- Charles Kazilek, Frederic Martini, Kim Cooper, Lucia Tranel, Alice Mills. 1998. Instructor's Manual Fundamentals of Anatomy & Physiology (Fourth Edition). Prentice-Hall. 237 pp. ISBN 0-13-751728-9
- Charles Kazilek, Frederic Martini, Kim Cooper. 2001. Instructor's Manual Fundamentals of Anatomy & Physiology (Fifth Edition). Prentice-Hall. 229 pp. ISBN 0-13-019676-2
- Charles Kazilek, Frederic Martini, Kim Cooper. 2004. Instructor's Manual Fundamentals of Anatomy & Physiology (6th Edition). Prentice-Hall. 392 pp. ISBN 0-13-046409-0
- Alan D. Magid, Charles Kazilek and Kim Cooper. 2006. Instructor's Manual Fundamentals of Anatomy & Physiology (7th Edition). Pearson Benjamin Cummings. 245 pp. ISBN 0-8053-7281-4
- Alan D. Magid, Charles Kazilek and Kim Cooper. 2009. Instructor's Manual Fundamentals of Anatomy & Physiology (8th Edition). Pearson Benjamin Cummings. pp 147. ISBN 9780321510976

=== Articles ===
- Chandler, Douglas E.; Kazilek, Charles J. (1986). "Chemotactic peptide-induced exocytosis in neutrophils: Granule fusion patterns depend on the source of messenger calcium". Journal of Cell Science. 83: 293–311. doi:10.1242/jcs.83.1.293. PMID 3100542.
- Chandler, Douglas E.; Kazilek, Charles J. (1986). "Extracellular coats on the surface of Strongylocentrotus purpuratus eggs: Stereo electron microscopy of quick-frozen and deep-etched specimens". Cell and Tissue Research. 246 (1): 153–161. doi:10.1007/BF00219012. PMID 3779797.
- Chandler, Douglas E.; Kazilek, Charles J. (1987). "Calcium signals in neutrophils can be divided into three distinct phases". Biochimica et Biophysica Acta (BBA) - Molecular Cell Research. 931 (2): 175–179. doi:10.1016/0167-4889(87)90204-7. PMID 3663715.
- Kazilek, C. J.; Merkle, C. J.; Chandler, D. E. (1988). "Hyperosmotic inhibition of calcium signals and exocytosis in rabbit neutrophils". American Journal of Physiology. Cell Physiology. 254 (5): C709–C718. doi:10.1152/ajpcell.1988.254.5.C709. PMID 3364556.
- Racowsky, C.; Baldwin, K. V.; Larabell, C. A.; Demarais, A. A.; Kazilek, C. J. (1989). "Down-regulation of membrana granulosa cell gap junctions is correlated with irreversible commitment to resume meiosis in golden Syrian hamster oocytes". European Journal of Cell Biology. 49 (2): 244–251. PMID 2776774.
- Sharp, W. P.; Kazilek, C. J. (1990). "Scanning Light Microscopy: Maximize Sharpness and Contrast" (PDF). Darkroom and Creative Camera Techniques. 11 (1): 43–45.
- Sharp, W. P., C. J. Kazilek, 1991. Scanning Light Microscopy. In Controlling Color Photography, Preston Publications, Chapter 4: pg 31–33.
- Satterlie, Richard A.; Norekian, Tigran P.; Jordan, Sheryl; Kazilek, Charles J. (1995). "Serotonergic Modulation of Swimming Speed in the Pteropod Mollusc Clione Limacina: I. Serotonin Immunoreactivity in the Central Nervous System and Wings". Journal of Experimental Biology. 198 (4): 895–904. Bibcode:1995JExpB.198..895S. doi:10.1242/jeb.198.4.895. PMID 7730752.
- Caitlin M. Schrein; John M. Lynch; Sarah K. Brem; Gary E. Marchant; Karen Schedler; Mark A. Spencer; Charles J. Kazilek; Margaret G. Coulombe (2009). "Preparing Teachers to Prepare Students for Post-Secondary Science: Observations From a Workshop About Evolution in the Classroom". The Journal of Effective Teaching. 9 (2): 68–79.
- Kazilek, Charles (2010). "Got a Question? "Ask a Biologist"". Science. 330 (6008): 1192–1193. Bibcode:2010Sci...330.1192K. doi:10.1126/science.1186993. PMID 21109662.
- Kazilek, Charles (2010). "Ask a Biologist: Bringing Science to the Public". PLOS Biology. 8 (10) e1000458. doi:10.1371/journal.pbio.1000458. PMC 2953523. PMID 20967230.

== Exhibitions and shows ==
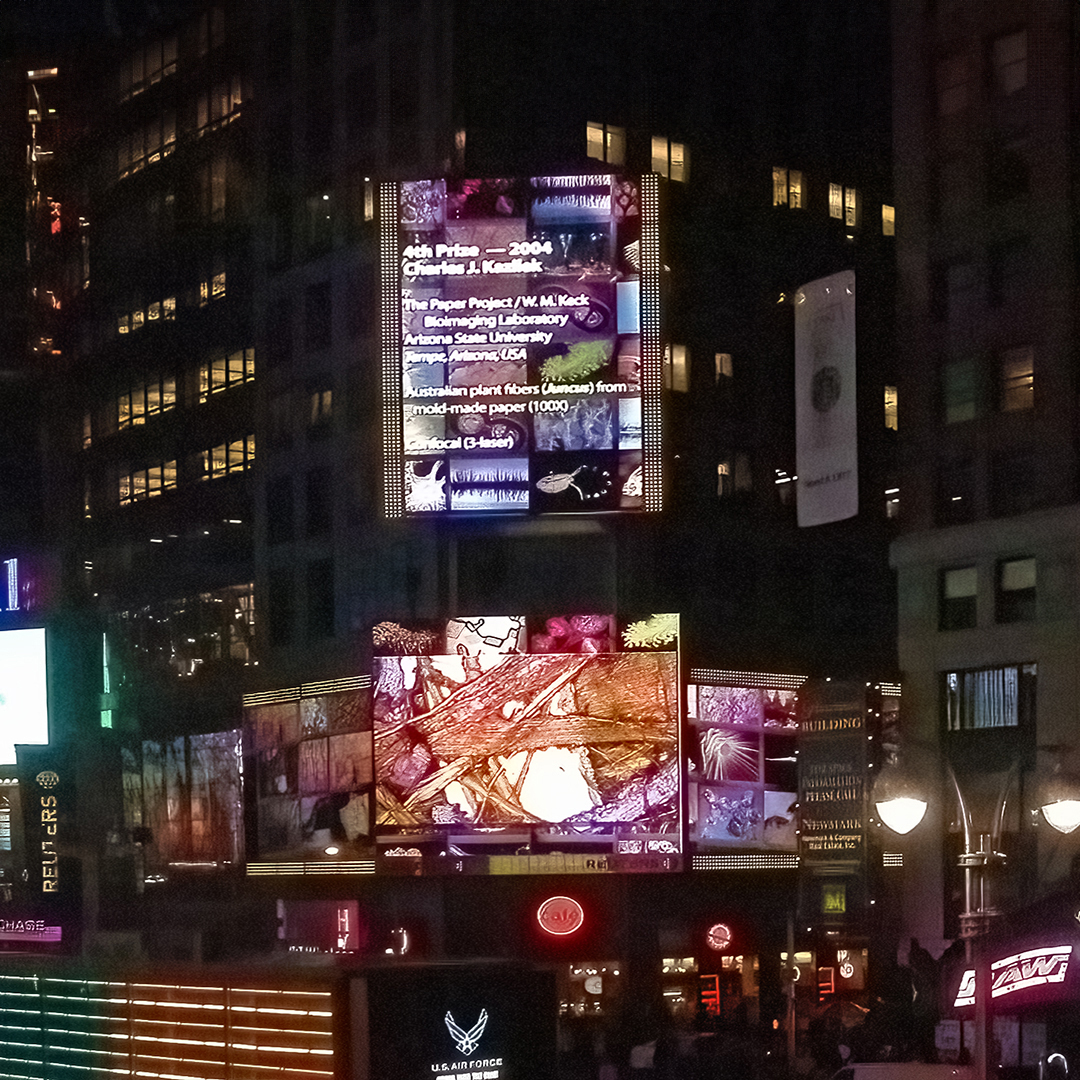
Paper Project image displayed on Times Square during the launch of the 17 city tour in 2004.

- The Face of Paper. Computing Commons Gallery. Arizona State University November 4 – December 17, 1999.
- A New Light on Paper. 27th Conference of the Southern Graphics Council. School of Art, Arizona State University. March 17 – 21, 1999.
- School of Art: A Curriculum-based Exhibit. Arizona Museum for Youth. Mesa Arizona. February 18 – May 26, 2000.
- "A To Z: Art By The Letter" Arizona Museum for Youth, Mesa Arizona, June 16 – January 5, 2000.
- The Face of Paper II. Arizona Science Center. Phoenix Arizona. November 24, 2000 – January 20, 2001.
- Paper Interiors: a dance exploration of real and virtual dimensions. American College Dance Festival. Arizona State University. March 14&15, 2002.Paper Interiors. Special Collections Gallery, J. Willard Marriott Library, University of Utah. May 17 – July 5, 2001.
- "Shells of the Desert." Computing Commons Gallery, Arizona State University. June 1 – July 27, 2001.
- Inaugural Herberger Art Walk. Juried Exhibition. Arizona State University. November 1, 2003.
- "Show of Color." Paper Project Interactive Room Installation. Arizona Museum for Youth. October 7, 2004 – January 28, 2005.
- "Jeepers Creepers: Bugs in Art." Arizona Museum for Youth. February 18 – August 28, 2005.
- "Nikon Small World Exhibit Tour." Debut Times Square New York. October 7, 2004. Exhibited in 17 cities. December 2004 – January 2006.
- "Nikon Small World Exhibit Tour." Exhibited in 17 cities. December 2006 – January 2008.
- "Fiberscapes." Paper Discovery Center. Appleton, Wisconsin. September 19 – December 30, 2006. – May 31, 2007.
- "Exploring Fiberscapes: Experiencing Paper in 3D." Paper Discovery Center. Appleton, Wisconsin. September 22, 2009 – August 30, 2010.
- "STEAM Show." Tempe Center for the Arts. Tempe Arizona. May 27 – September 17, 2016.
