= Ask a Biologist =

Life sciences outreach program

Ask A Biologist
- Website type: Biology education
- Owners: ASU College of Liberal Arts and Sciences, School of Life Sciences
- Website: http://askabiologist.asu.edu/
- Commercial: No
- Registration: None
- Launched: Fall 1997
- Current status: Active

Ask A Biologist is a science outreach program originating from Arizona State University's School of Life Sciences, a unit of the ASU College of Liberal Arts and Sciences.

== About the program ==
Ask A Biologist is a pre-kindergarten through high school program dedicated to answering questions from students, their teachers, and parents. The program's primary focus is to connect students and teachers with working scientists through a question-and-answer web e-mail form. The companion website also includes a large collection of free content and activities that can be used inside, as well as outside, of the classroom. The award-winning program has been continuously running for more than 25 years, with the assistance of more than 150 volunteer scientists, faculty, and graduate students in biology and related fields. In 2010 the program released its new website interface and features that became the subject for articles in the journals Science and PLOS Biology.

=== Primary audience ===
Ask A Biologist materials are free and open to anyone with access to the World-Wide-Web. The question portion of the program serves primarily students, grades preK-12, as well as their teachers and parents. In addition, lifelong learners are encouraged to use the website materials.

=== History ===
Ask A Biologist was launched late in 1997 by Charles Kazilek in the School of Life Sciences, with an early version viewable on the Internet Archive a.k.a. The WayBackMachine. Initially, the site consisted solely of a question submission form, a feature that remains one of its core activities.

By 2001, the site had grown to over 1,000 pages of content, including articles about current research, profiles of scientists, an image gallery, mystery images, puzzles, coloring pages, quizzes, and science activities.

In 2003, the website released the Virtual Pocket Seed Experiment, the first of several data sets that could be used in and outside of the classroom. The experiment was based on the classic seed germination experiment, but included the feature of time-lapse animation of various seed experiments.

In 2004, a second data set was released, in cooperation with Audubon Arizona. The Virtual Bird Aviary, included the majority of bird species found in the Southwest United States including more than 400 vocal recordings and companion sonograms, bird images, text descriptions, and range maps.

In 2005, the website was peer-reviewed by the Multimedia Educational Resource for Learning and Online Teaching (MERLOT), earning a "five out of five stars" rating.

In 2006, the website introduced the Mysterious World of Dr. Biology a comic book adventure. The activity encouraged students to piece together a mystery. Students reconstructed a chain of events in the Dr. Biology laboratory and field site, writing their own narrative for the story.

Early in 2007, Ask A Biologist became one of the early content channels on iTunes U with its audio podcast of the same name. Hosted by Dr. Biology, the program was soon listed as one of five great courses by Macworld. Some of the guest scientists interviewed on the show included biologists and Pulitzer Prize-winning authors Edward O. Wilson and Bert Hölldobler, as well as physicist and writer Paul Davies.

In 2008, the audio podcast program introduced a co-host contest that offered students in the Phoenix metro area the opportunity to meet and interview working scientists.

In 2009, the National Science Foundation (NSF) funded the redesign of the Ask A Biologist website including the addition of Web 2.0 tools as part of the National Science Digital Library (NSDL).

In 2010, Ask A Biologist released its new website developed using a Web content management tool Drupal and adding Web 2.0 options. The new content management expanded website features including translations of content into French and Spanish and an improved interface for audio streaming. The website was officially accessioned by the NSDL in September.

In 2011 two new sections were added to the website. Body Depot is a collaborative project with the Arizona Science Center funded by the National Institutes of Health (NIH). PLOSable is a project that links plain language and kid-friendly reviews to primary source publications in journals of the Public Library of Science.

In 2011 the first games are released, Monster Maker, Busy Bones, and Skeleton Viewer.

In 2017 virtual tours using VR 360 still images are introduced.

In 2019 all games and simulations are converted to HTML5 in advance of the retirement of Adobe Flash.

During 2020 the website passes 100 million lifetime visits.

In 2023 virtual tours 2.0 are released including the use of an artificial intelligence text-to-speech tour guide named Bella.

=== Available content ===
- Stories about Biology
- Stories about Biologists
- Games and Simulations
- Body Depot
- Biology Bits
- PLOSable
- Image Gallery
- Puzzles – Word Search & Crossword
- Coloring Pages
- Mysterious World of Dr. Biology comic book adventure activity
- Audio Podcasts
- Co-host Contest
- Ugly Bug Contest
- Bird Finder Tool
- Virtual Pocket Seed Experiment
- Biology Virtual Reality Tours

=== Awards ===
2010 Science Prize for Online Resources in Education (SPORE). American Association for the Advancement of Science (AAAS).

2008 Silver Quill Award of Excellence. International Association of Business Communicators Southern Region.

2004 Digital Education Achievement Award. The Center for Digital Education.

2004 Exemplary Web Site Award. Arizona Technology in Education Alliance.

2003 President's Award for Innovation. Arizona State University.

== See also ==
- Popular science
- Science outreach
