= Paper Project =

- Website type: Visual Arts Biology Education
- Owner: Paper Project
- Website: https://paperproject.org
- Commercial: No
- Registration: None
- Launched: Fall 1999
- Current status: Active

The Paper Project is a fusion project that blends art, science, and technology into engaging 2D and 3D experiences.

== About the project ==
The Paper Project is a multidimensional art and science project exploring the microscopic structure of paper using a scanning-laser confocal microscope. Created by artist and scientist Charles Kazilek and printer and paper maker Gene Valentine (July 29, 1938 – February 22, 2022) in 1999 the project began exhibiting works in various formats including 2D and virtual 3D images. The 3D anaglyphic images make use of inexpensive red-blue 3D glasses first introduced to moviegoers in the 1950s. When wearing 3D glasses, it is as if the viewer has been reduced to the size of a period at the end of a sentence and can explore the invisible structure and beauty of paper.

In 2002, the project expanded to dance, collaborating with costume designers Jacqueline Benard and Galina Mihaleva and dance choreographer Jennifer Tsukayama. The result of the collaboration was Paper Interiors: a dance exploration of real and virtual dimensions which debuted at the American College Dance Festival. In 2004, Jennifer Tsukayama became a member of the Paper Project and the group created a traveling 3D immersive room based on the earlier dance performance. The first installation of the room was at the Arizona Museum for Youth.

Since its creation, images from the Paper Project have been viewed around the world in museums, science centers, and on the Web. In addition to exhibits, the Paper Project has developed educational content that can be used to engage students in art, history, biology, chemistry, and physics.

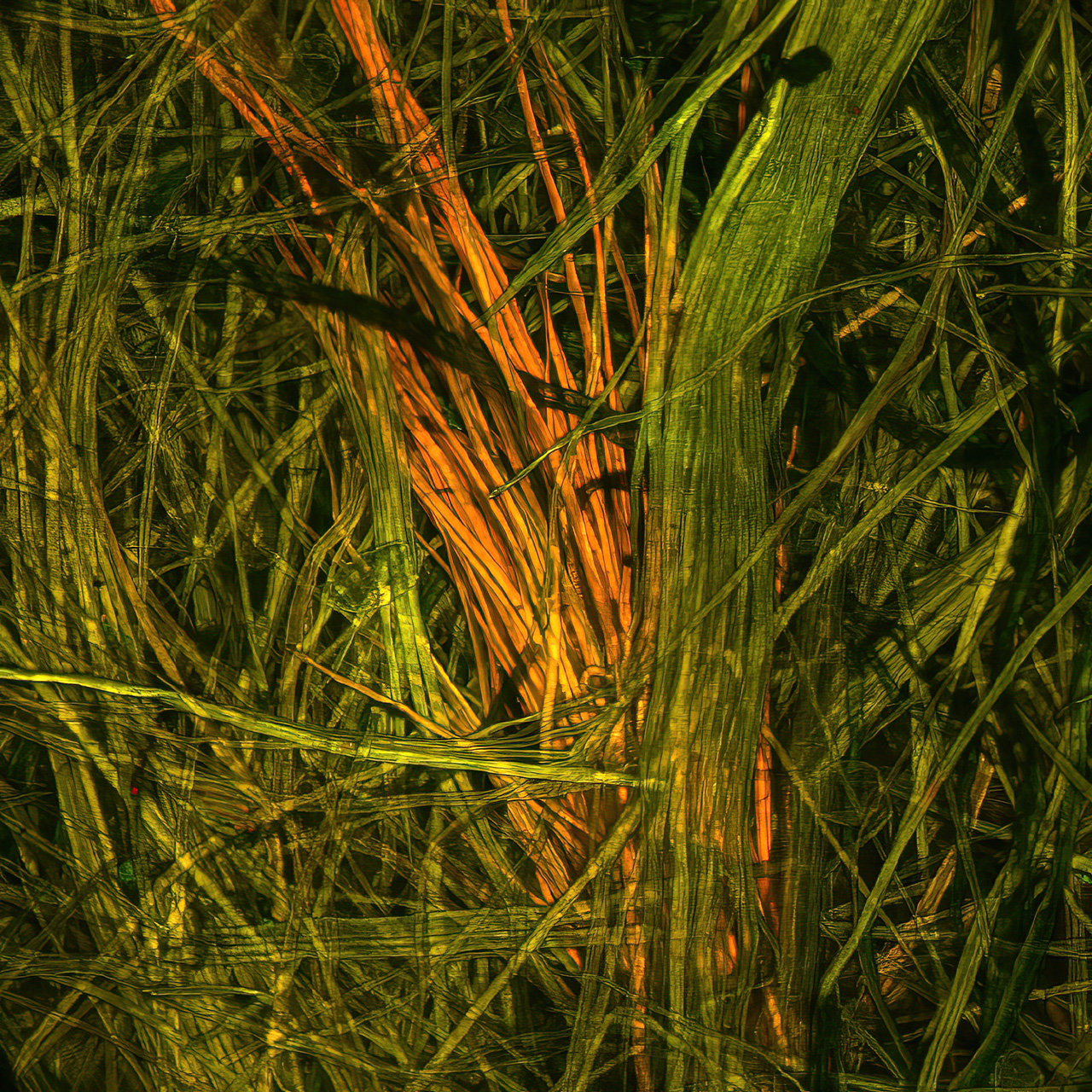
Cattail-handmade paper. Imaged using a scanning-laser confocal microscope.

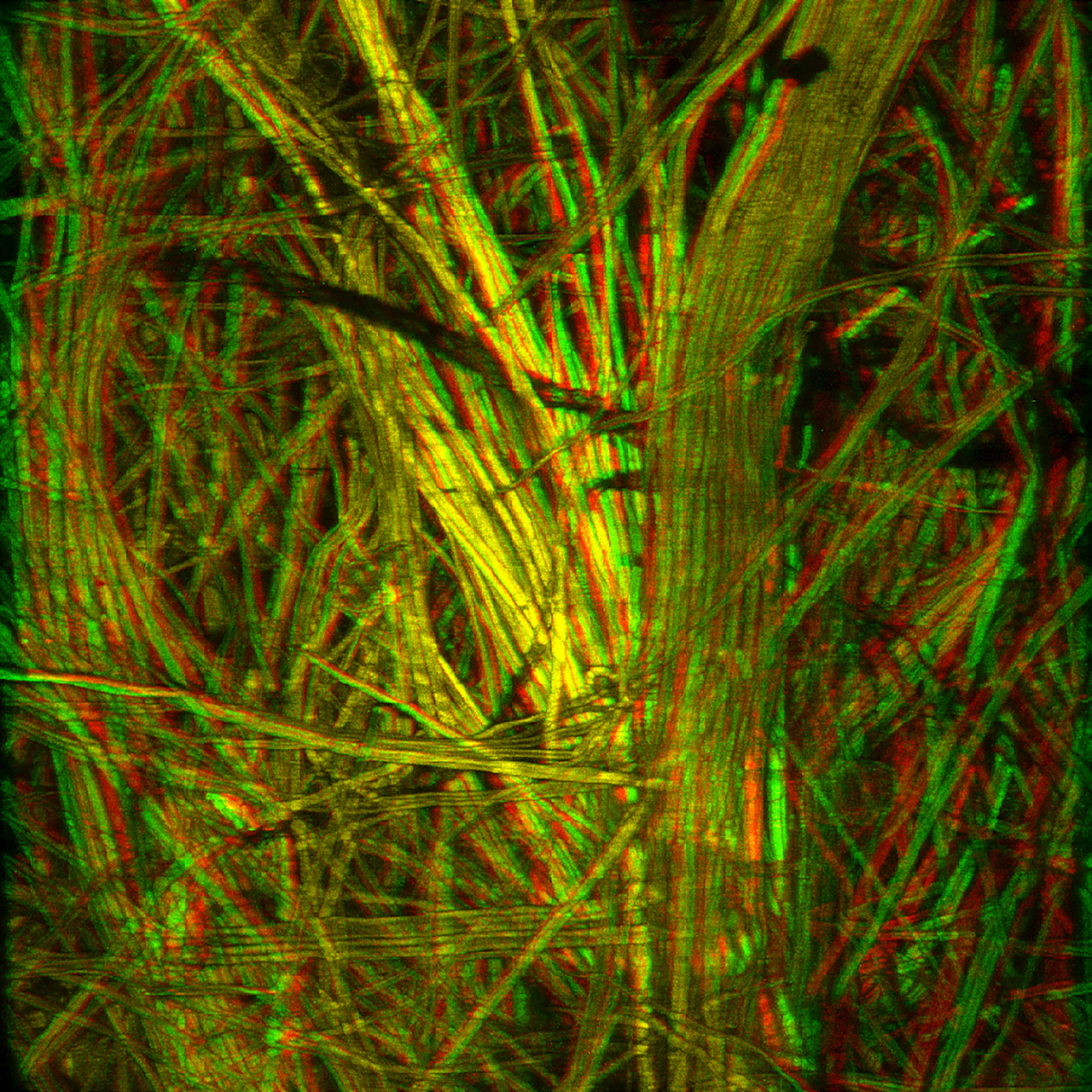
Anaglyphic (3-D) version of cattail-handmade paper. Imaged using a scanning-laser confocal microscope. Requires red-blue anaglyphic glasses.

=== Exhibits ===
- A New Light on Paper. 27th Conference of the Southern Graphics Council. School of Art, Arizona State University. March 17–21, 1999
- The Face of Paper. Computing Commons Gallery. Arizona State University. November 4 - December 17, 1999
- School of Art: A Curriculum-based Exhibit. Arizona Museum for Youth. Mesa Arizona. February 18 - May 26, 2000
- The Face of Paper II. Arizona Science Center. Phoenix Arizona. November 24, 2000 - January 20, 2001
- Paper Interiors. Special Collections Gallery, J. Willard Marriott Library. University of Utah. May 17 - July 5, 2001
- Paper Interiors: a dance exploration of real and virtual dimensions. American College Dance Festival. Arizona State University. March 14&15, 2002.
- Show of Color. Debut of the Paper Interiors Installation. Arizona Museum for Youth. Mesa Arizona. October 8, 2004 - January 28, 2005
- Paper Project on Times Square - New York. Nikon Small World Touring Exhibit. October 31, 2004 - January 16, 2006
- Paper Project Travels to Kenya. Lolgorian Kenya. July, 2006
- Fiberscapes: Experience Paper in 3D. The Paper Discovery Center. September 19, 2006 - May 30, 2007
- Nikon Small World Tour 2006 - 2007. Nikon Small World Tour. October 6, 2006 - January 13, 2008
- Nikon Small World Tour 2008 - 2010. Nikon Small World Tour. October 24, 2006 - January 10, 2010
- Exploring Fiberscapes: Experience Paper in 3D. The Paper Discovery Center. September 22, 2009 - May 30, 2010

=== Publications ===
- "Rediscovering the Familiar: The Interior Aesthetics of Paper",Tijdloos Papier. Timeless Paper. Holland Press, 2002. 80-85. ISBN 90-73803-03-9.
- "Image Analysis & 3D Reconstruction",Microscopy II | CD. Published by Multimedia Knowledge Inc. in conjunction with Purdue University Cytometry Laboratories. 2004. ISBN 1-890473-08-1
- "Image Analysis & 3D Reconstruction",Microscopy III | CD. Published by Multimedia Knowledge Inc. in conjunction with Purdue University Cytometry Laboratories. 2005. ISBN 1-890473-07-3
- "World Hidden in Paper: The 3-DWorld That Has Never Been Seen Before", Quo Magazine, May 2007. ISSN 1673-7563

=== History ===
- The Paper Project started in 1999 by two faculty members of Arizona State University. The project includes a Web site viewable on the Internet Archive a.k.a. The WayBackMachine.
- Also in 1999 the first two exhibits of art from the project are held. A New Light on Paper exhibited at the 27th Conference of the Southern Graphics Council and the Face of Paper at the Arizona State University Computing Commons Gallery are the first public presentations of the 2D and 3D works.
- In 2000, works are included in the School of Art: A Curriculum-based Exhibit at the Arizona Museum for Youth in Mesa Arizona as well as an exhibit Face of Paper II at the Arizona Science Center. Early educational outreach materials are also added to the Web site.
- In 2001, the works from the project travel to Utah for an exhibit, Paper Interiors, held in the Special Collections Gallery of the J. Willard Marriott Library at the University of Utah.
- A dance component was added to the Project in 2002. The 3D immersive work was a collaboration with two costume designers, Jacqueline Benard and Galina Mihaleva and dance choreographer Jennifer Tsukayama. Paper Interiors: a dance exploration of real and virtual dimensions debuts at the American College Dance Festival. The development and performance is funded by a grant from the Institute for the Studies in the Arts. The audience explores real and virtual 2D and 3D environments wearing anaglyphic glasses. The virtual 3D environment is created using five LCD computer projectors as well as having costumes made from material printed with 3D images.
- In 2004, an immersive 3D room debuts at the Arizona Museum for Youth in its Show of Color exhibit. Based on the 3D dance performance the Paper Interiors Installation moves the audience into the 3D space permitting the viewer to walk into the virtual space and interact with the 3D images.
- Also in 2004, a winning image from the Paper Project debuts on Times Square as part of the Nikon International Small World Competition and travels on a 17 city museum tour.
- In 2006, the Paper Project travels to Lolgorian Kenya as part of an education outreach trip. Sets of posters and 3D glasses are distributed to classrooms meeting the challenge of getting immersive science content into environments void of technology.
- A Paper Project image is selected for a second time as a winner of the Nikon International Small World Competition in 2006 and travels on a 25 city museum tour.
- From September 19, 2006 through May 30, 2007 a new exhibit, Fiberscapes, is on display at the Paper Discovery Center in Appleton Wisconsin. The center is located in the heart of paper making country where many of the paper manufacturers had paper mills.
- In 2008, a Paper Project image is selected for a third time as a winner of the Nikon International Small World Competition and travels on an 18 city tour. The image is featured on multiple Web sites including National Geographic, New York Times, and MSNBC.

=== Awards ===
2008 Nikon International Small World Competition - Fifth Place.

2006 Nikon International Small World Competition - Fourth Place.

2005 Classics Award Winner for Teacher Education. Multimedia Educational Resources for Learning and Online Teaching (MERLOT).

2004 Nikon International Small World Competition - Fourth Place.
