= Light scanning photomacrography =

Light Scanning Photomacrography (LSP), also known as Scanning Light Photomacrography (SLP) or Deep-Field Photomacrography, is a photographic film technique that allows for high magnification light imaging with exceptional depth of field (DOF). This method overcomes the limitations of conventional macro photography, which typically only keeps a portion of the subject in acceptable focus at high magnifications.

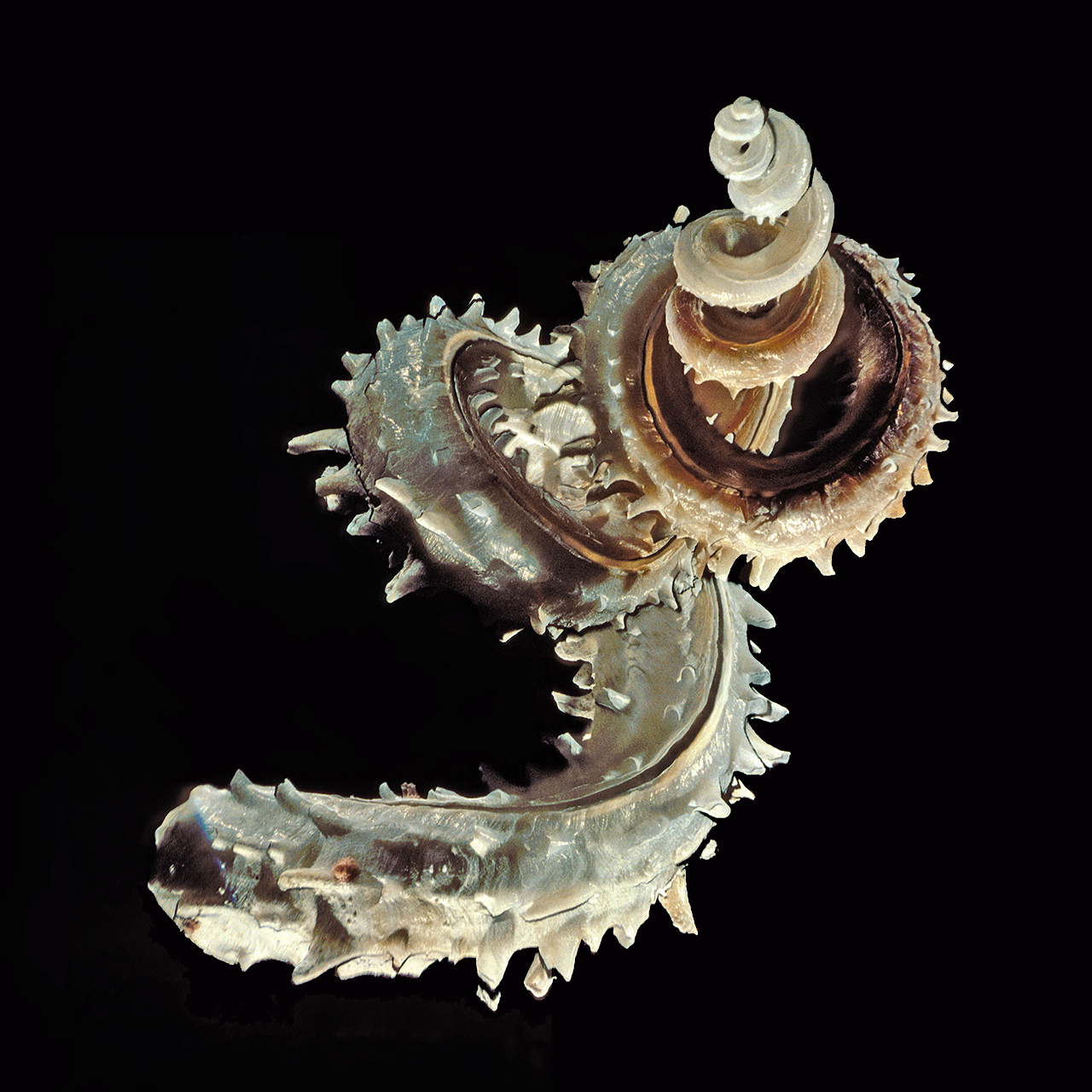
Sea snail shell (Tenagodus anguinus) image captured using scanning light photography instrument.

== Historical background ==
The principles of LSP were first documented in the early 1960s by Dan McLachlan Jr., who highlighted its capability for extreme focal depth in microscopy and in 1968 patented the process.

The technique was revived and further developed in the 1980s by photographers such as Darwin Dale and Nile Root, a faculty member at the Rochester Institute of Technology. In the early 1990s, William Sharp and Charles Kazilek, both researchers at Arizona State University, also published articles describing their technique and system setup for capturing SLP images.

== Predecessor to stack image photography ==
Light Scanning Photomacrography offered a powerful analog tool for high-detail imaging in the age of film photography. It provided a comprehensive depth of field, making it invaluable in scientific and biomedical photography. As technology and techniques continue to evolve, LSP has been replaced by digital image focus stacking. This technique uses a collection of images captured in series at different focal depths, which are then processed using computer software to create a single image with a greater focus depth than any single image.

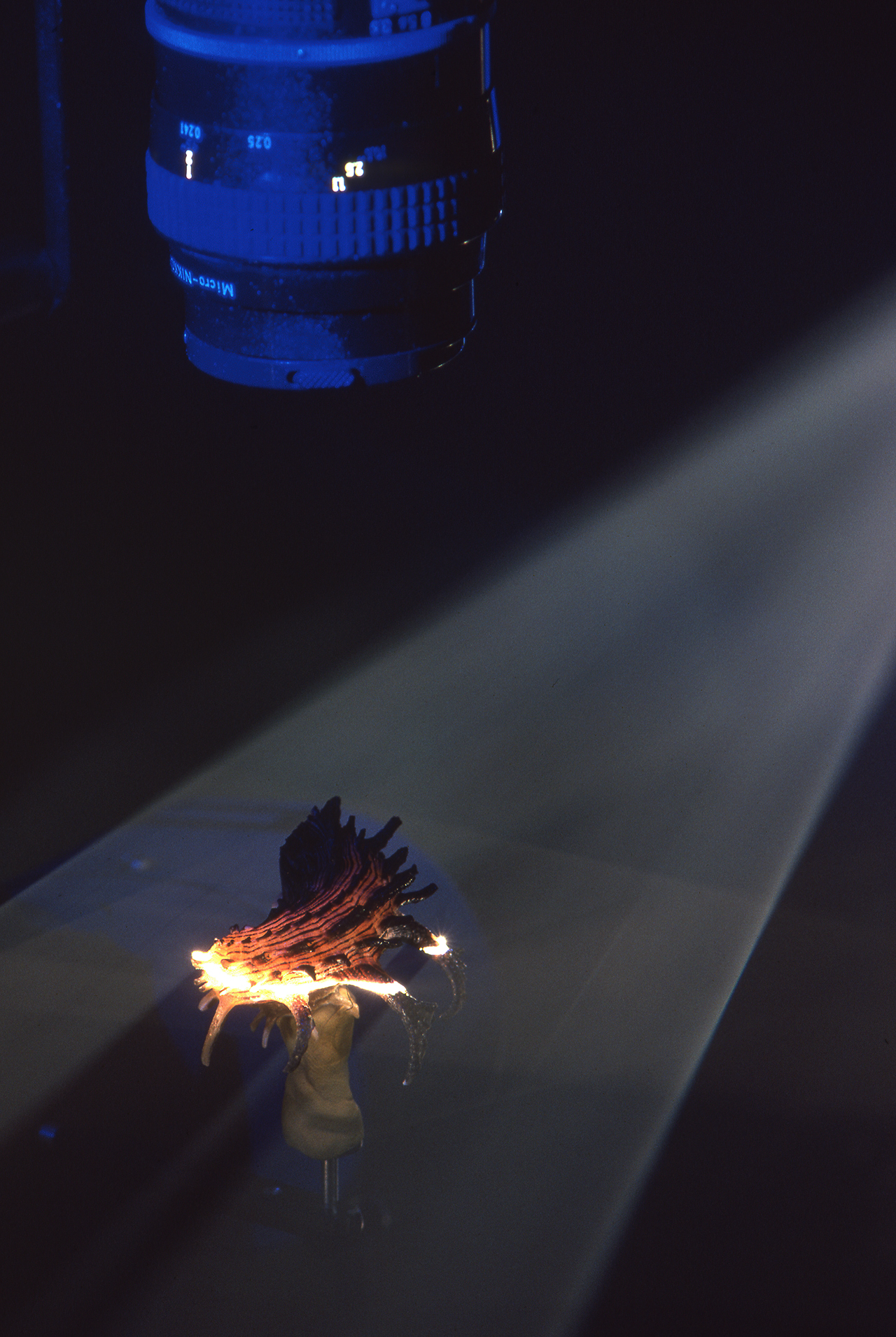
Capturing an image of a seashell using a scanning light photography instrument.

== LSP technique and results ==
LSP involves the use of a thin plane of light that scans across the subject, which is mounted on a stage moving perpendicular to the film plane. The technique utilizes traditional optics and is governed by the physical laws of depth of field. By moving the subject through a narrow band of illumination, the entire subject can be recorded in sharp focus from the nearest details to the farthest ones. This analog process produces sharp and detailed images by slowly recording the image on film as the specimen passes through the sheet of light that is thinner than the effective DOF.

Light Scanning Photomacrography Depth of Field Diagram. Labels: 1) camera lens, 2) color correction filters, 3) dotted line shows effective DOF, 4) light sheet, 5) motorized stage with specimen.

Because the image is captured at the same relative distance from the camera lens, the resulting images are axonometric rather than perspective projection, which is what the human eye sees and is typically captured by a film camera. Because all parts of an LSP image are captured at the same distance from the lens, relative measurements can be taken from an LSP photograph and can be used for comparison.

== Equipment and setup ==
A typical LSP setup includes:

- A stage that can move the subject perpendicular to the film plane.
- Light sources, in some cases modified projectors, are used to project a thin plane of light.
- A camera mounted on a stable stand such as a tabletop copy stand.

In 1991, Sharp and Kazilek described their SLP system that used three Kodak Ektagraphic slide projectors with zoom lenses to create a thin plane of light. The projectors each had a slide mount with two razor blades placed edge-to-edge to create a thin slit for the light to pass through. The image was captured using a Nikon FE-2 SLR camera mounted above the specimen. Kodachrome 25 slide film was used to record the image and to minimize film grain size and maximize image sharpness

Light Scanning Photomacrography (LSP), or Scanning Light Photomacrography (SLP) Setup. Labels: 1) film camera 2) copy stand 3) specimen mounted on a motorized stage 4) equipment leveling jacks 5) slide projector.

== Commercial systems ==
A commercial SLP instrument was produced by the Irvine Optical Corp. Their DYNAPHOT system was based on a photomacroscope and could capture images on 4x5 film. The instrument came with two or three illumination sources and a motorized specimen stage. The system advertised a 2X – 40X magnification range and the ability to capture images in black and white and color. Other systems have been developed by Nile Root and Theodore Clarke and reported higher magnifications (up to 100X).

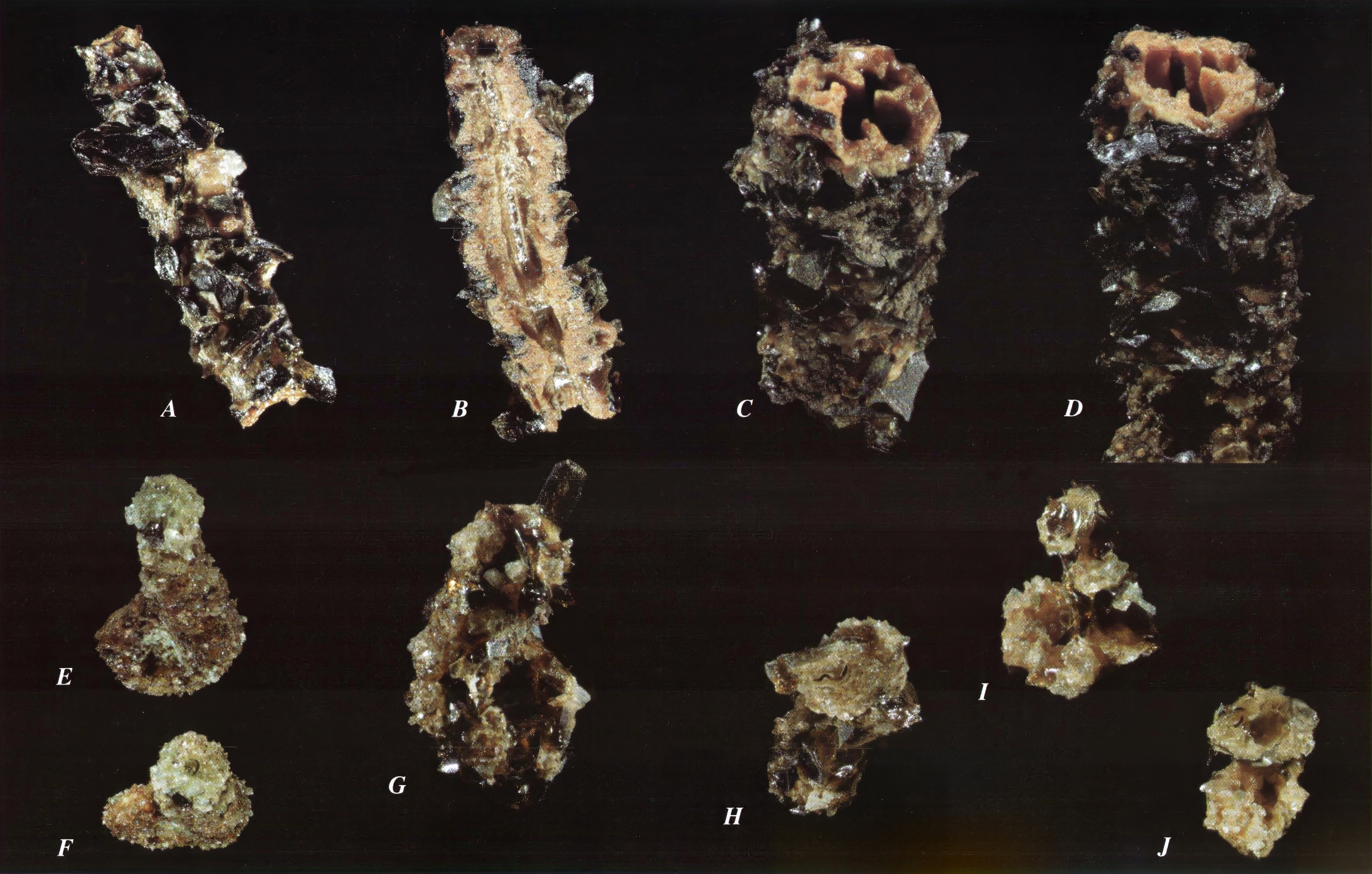
Dynaphot Light Scanning Images of foraminifers from Escanaba Trough.

== LSP process ==
- Alignment and Focusing: The light sources are aligned and focused to project a thin, consistent plane of light across the subject.
- Stage Movement: The subject stage moves at a controlled speed, scanning through the plane of light.
- Image Capture: The camera shutter is set to a long exposure or can be opened and closed manually. As the subject moves through the illuminated plane, it is recorded on the film. This process is very much like painting an image onto the film using photons instead of paint.

== Applications ==
LSP was particularly useful in biomedical photography, where it was used to document magnified subjects with increased depth of field over traditional macro and micro photography. It has been employed to capture detailed images of biological specimens, such as imaging small insects and their parts. SLP has been used to document shell collections for scientific documentation and research. Other applications include forensic science, mineralogy, and the imaging of fractured surfaces and parts

== Advantages and challenges of LSP imaging ==
=== Advantages ===
- Exceptional depth of field: Subjects are rendered in sharp focus throughout.
- High magnification: Detailed images at significant magnification without sacrificing DOF.
- Analog precision: Provides a non-digital solution with accurate image representation.
- Versatility: Can be used for a range of subject sizes, from macro to non-macro scales.

=== Challenges ===
- Technical complexity: Requires precise setup and alignment.
- Exposure time: Typically requires long exposure times due to the scanning process.
- Contrast control: The highly directional lighting can create harsh shadows and high contrast, which may need to be managed.
- Digital competition: Focus stacking has largely replaced LSP in the digital era due to convenience and flexibility.

== DIY contributions ==
Enthusiasts and researchers have contributed to the development and accessibility of LSP by creating and sharing DIY guides. These contributions have enabled others to build their own LSP systems using readily available materials and components. Nile Root's publications provide detailed instructions and recommendations for constructing an LSP setup. These DIY systems have allowed a wider audience to explore and utilize the benefits of LSP imaging in various fields.

== See also ==
- Focus stacking
