= The Politically Incorrect Guide to Science =

2005 book by Tom Bethell

- Cover
- Author: Tom Bethell
- Language: English
- Series: Politically Incorrect Guides
- Subject: Politicization of science
- Publisher: Regnery Publishing
- Publication date: 2005
- Publication place: United States
- Media type: Print (Hardcover and Paperback)
- Pages: 270
- ISBN: 978-0895260314

The Politically Incorrect Guide to Science is a 2005 book by conservative journalist Tom Bethell, in which the author makes questionable and highly politicized claims on subjects such as HIV/AIDS, intelligent design, and the relationship between science and Christianity. It was published by Regnery Publishing.

The book received positive reviews from conservatives and was widely criticized by scientists and book reviewers, with Publishers Weekly summarizing it thus: "In the end, this book is unlikely to sway readers who aren't already in Bethell's ideological camp, as any points worthy of discussion get lost in the glut of unsourced claims".
