= Tom Bethell =

American journalist (1936–2021)

- Born: July 17, 1936; London
- Died: February 12, 2021 (aged 84); Washington, D.C., U.S.
- Education: Trinity College, Oxford
- Occupations: Journalist, writer

Tom Bethell (/bəˈθɛl/; July 17, 1936 – February 12, 2021) was an American journalist who wrote mainly on economic and scientific issues.

== Life and career ==
Bethell was born and raised in London, England. He was educated at Downside School and Trinity College, Oxford. A resident of the District of Columbia, he lived in Virginia, Louisiana, and California. From 1962 to 1965 he taught math at Woodberry Forest School, Virginia. He was married to Donna R. Fitzpatrick of Washington, D.C. He was a senior editor of The American Spectator and was for 25 years a media fellow of the Hoover Institution. He was Washington editor of Harper's, and an editor of the Washington Monthly.

In 1980, he received a Gerald Loeb Award Honorable Mention for Columns/Editorial for "Fooling With the Budget."

=== Jim Garrison investigation ===
Bethell was hired as a researcher by New Orleans district attorney Jim Garrison to assist with his prosecution of Clay Shaw for conspiracy to assassinate John F. Kennedy. Bethell gave no credence to Garrison's charges that Shaw was involved. Shaw was acquitted after the jury deliberated for about an hour.

== Controversy ==
In 1976, Bethell wrote a controversial article for Harper’s Magazine titled "Darwin's Mistake". According to Bethell there is no independent criterion of fitness and natural selection is a tautology. Bethell also stated that Darwin's theory was on "the verge of collapse" and natural selection had been "quietly abandoned" by his supporters. These claims were disputed by biologists. The paleontologist Stephen Jay Gould wrote a rebuttal to Bethell's arguments.

Bethell was a member of the Group for the Scientific Reappraisal of the HIV-AIDS Hypothesis, which denies that HIV causes AIDS. In The Politically Incorrect Guide to Science (2005), he promoted denial of the existence of man-made global warming, AIDS denialism, and denial of evolution (which Bethell denied was "real science"). Bethell endorsed the intelligent design documentary-style film Expelled: No Intelligence Allowed.

Bethell died from complications of Parkinson's disease at his home in Washington, D.C. in February 2021, aged 84.

== Selected publications ==
Articles

- "Darwin's Mistake." Harper's Magazine, Vol. 252, No. 1509, February 1976, pp. 70-75.
- "Against Bilingual Education." Harper’s Magazine, Vol. 258, February 1979, pp. 30-33. doi:10.2307/324235. JSTOR 324235.
- "The Longshoreman Philosopher."Hoover Digest, No. 1, January 2003. Archived from the original.
- "Arnold Beichman, 1913-2010: an oral history and remembrance of a great adventurer and friend." The American Spectator, Vol. 43, No. 4, May 2010. Archived from the original.

Books

- George Lewis: A Jazzman From New Orleans. Berkeley: University of California Press, 1977.
- The Electric Windmill: An Inadvertent Autobiography. Washington, D.C.: Regnery Gateway, 1988.
- Noblest Triumph: Property and Prosperity through the Ages. New York: St. Martin's Press, 1998.
- The Politically Incorrect Guide to Science. Washington, D.C.: Regnery Press, 2005.
- Questioning Einstein: Is Relativity Necessary? Vales Lake Publishing, 2009.
- Eric Hoffer: The Longshoreman Philosopher. Stanford: Hoover Institution Press, 2012.
- Darwin's House of Cards. Seattle: Discovery Institute Press, 2017. Audiobook available.

Book contributions

- "Mises And Gorbachev: Why Socialism Still Doesn't Work." pp. 226-230. The Free Market Reader, edited by Lew Rockwell. Auburn: The Ludwig von Mises Institute, 1988. ISBN 0945466021.
- "Bilingual Education in the Eighties: One Hispanic's Perspective." pp. 153-162. American Education: Essays in the Economics of Liberty, edited by Robert Emmet Long. New York: H. W. Wilson, 1984. ISBN 978-0824206994.
