= David Kelsey =

American Reformed theologian (born 1932)

David H. Kelsey (born 1932) is an American theologian and academic who is the Luther Weigle Professor Emeritus of Theology at Yale Divinity School.

== Biography ==
Kelsey is a graduate of Haverford College and currently Luther Weigle Professor Emeritus of Theology at Yale Divinity School. Like his colleagues Hans Frei and George Lindbeck, Kelsey received both a B.D. (1958) and Ph.D. (1964) from Yale. He taught in the Religion Department of Dartmouth College from 1961 to 1965 and was a member of the faculty at Yale Divinity School from 1965 until his retirement in 2005. In 2017 he held The Alonzo L. McDonald Family Chair on the Life and Teachings of Jesus and their Impact on Culture, Candler School of Theology, Emory University, Atlanta GA.

He has delivered the Thomas White Currie Lectures at Austin Presbyterian Theological Seminary in 1982, the Sarum Lectures, Oxford University, during Trinity Term 1985, the Tate-Wilson Lectures, Perkins School of Theology at Southern Methodist University in 1986, the Taylor Lectures, Yale Divinity School in 2004, and in 2011 the Warfield Lectures at Princeton Theological Seminary.

In 2012, he was awarded an honorary doctorate in theology from the University of Tübingen in Germany. This honor is rarely conferred upon international scholars.

== Works ==
- The Fabric of Paul Tillich's Theology, (New Haven: Yale University Press,1967.
- The Uses of Scripture in Recent Theology, (London: SCM Press, 1975)
- ‘Biblical narrative and theological anthropology’, in Garrett Green, ed, Scriptural Authority and Narrative Interpretation, (Philadelphia: Fortress Press, 1987)
- To Understand God Truly: What’s Theological About Theological Education?, (Westminster John Knox Press, 1992)
- Between Athens and Berlin: The Theological Education Debate, (Wm. B. Eerdmans Publishing Company, 1993)
- 'Charles Hodge as Interpreter of Scripture', in John W. Stewart and James H. Moorhead, eds, Charles Hodge Revisited, (Wm. B. Eerdmans Publishing Company, 2002.
- Imagining Redemption, (Westminster John Knox Press, 2005)
- ‘Personal Bodies: A Theological Anthropological Proposal’, in Richard Lints, Michael S Horton, Mark R Talbot, eds, Personal Identity in Theological Perspective, (Grand Rapids, MI: William B Eerdmans, 2006)
- ‘The Human Creature’, in John Webster, Kathryn Tanner and Iain Torrance, eds, The Oxford Handbook of Systematic Theology, (Oxford: Oxford University Press, 2007)
- Eccentric Existence: A Theological Anthropology, (Louisville, KY: Westminster John Knox Press, 2009)
- 'Created For Their Own Sakes: Counter-Intuitive Senses of Human Creatures' Flourishing', in Matthew Croasmun, Zoran Grozdanow, and Ryan McAnnaly-Linz, ends, Envisioning the Good Life, (Eugene, OR: Cascade Books)
