= Carolyn Larabell =

American scientist

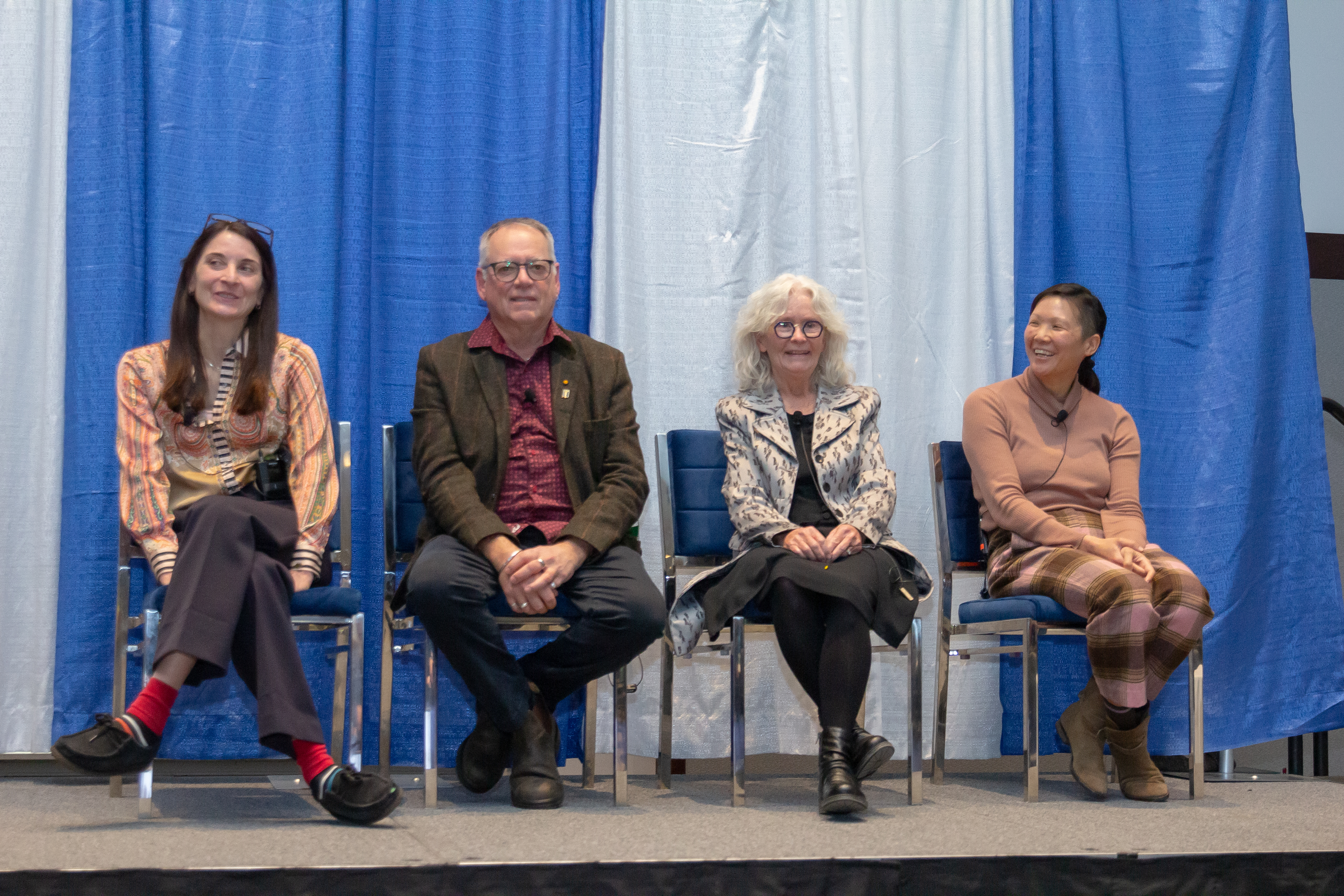
- Larebell (3rd from left) at AAAS 2025
- Education: Arizona State University
- Awards: David A. Shirley Award for Outstanding Scientific Achievement
- Scientific career
- Fields: Structural biology, biological imaging, x-ray tomography, biophysics
- Workplaces: University of California, San Francisco, National Center for X-ray Tomography at Lawrence Berkeley National Laboratory,

Carolyn Larabell is an American scientist who led the first construction and commissioning of a soft x-ray microscope to be used for biological imaging. Her research primarily focuses on X-ray microtomography, a technology that allows for a 3D visualization of different cells. Larabell is a joint anatomy professor at the University of California, San Francisco and both the founder and director of the National Center for X-ray Tomography.

== Education and career ==
Larabell received her MS in Zoology and her PhD in Cell Biology from Arizona State University in 1998. Continuing her studies, Larabell performed postdoctoral research in neurobiology at Stanford University, eventually transferring into the department of Biochemistry and Biophysics at the University of California, Davis where she began working with electron microscopy.

Since 1997, Larabell has been at the Lawrence Berkeley National Laboratory, where her research efforts center around developing soft x-ray tomography and other novel imaging techniques. Larabell became the Advanced Light Source Professor at Lawrence Berkeley National Laboratory in 1999, and was appointed as a joint professor in the Department of Anatomy at University of California, San Francisco School of Medicine. Additionally, Larabell is a senior faculty scientist and member of the Molecular Biophysics and Integrated Bioimaging Division (MBIB) management team, serving as the senior advisor to the Division Director.

Larabell is both the founder and director of the National Center for X-ray Tomography (NCXT) at Lawrence Berkeley National Laboratory, established in 2004. NCXT aims to visualize cells through soft x-ray tomography and helps to develop additional imaging technologies in order to fuel biomedical research. One of Larabell and the NXCT staff's major developments includes the Beamline 2.1 (XM-2), noted as the first ever soft x-ray microscope to be built. Other work of NXCT through this technology includes recent identification of a pathway that can clear misfolded proteins from cells, potentially being a future source of therapy for Alzheimer, Parkinson, and Huntington diseases.

Being the principal investigator for the soft x-ray tomography project, Larabell describes x-ray microscopy as the bridge between light microscopy and electron microscopy. These particular microscopes can potentially allow for “cat scans” of biological cells and provide a new understanding of human diseases at a molecular level.

== Research ==
In 2004, Larabell and colleague Mark Le Gros conducted a study that examined Saccharomyces cerevisiae, a particular species of yeast, using X-ray tomography. Being one of Larabell’s primary interests, X-ray tomography allows for the generation of 3D information of whole cells; in this particular study, the technology was used to provide a view of the internal structural organization of the selected yeast cells. In the yeast cells, lipid droplets and large vacuoles within the yeast could be identified. Other cell organelles were able to be identified, but due to its new development at the present time, confirmation through standard transmission electron microscopy was also utilized.

In 2014, Larabell and her colleagues provided an analysis of the Beamline 2.1 (XM-2) soft X-ray microscope. XM-2 was designed and is now operated by the National Center for X-ray Tomography (NXCT), with its current location in sector 2 of the Advanced Light Source at Lawrence Berkeley National Laboratory. XM-2’s primary focus is biological imaging, using its technology to visualize cellular organization and cells undergoing morphological changes. The technology contains a cryogenic rotation stage that allows for tomographic data collection from cryo-preserved and intact cells. Through the development of XM-2, Larabell and the NXCT team are now able to image a variety of cells, ranging from bacteria to large mammals. New studies are underway using this technology, including analyzing the etiology of diseases and observing exposed cells to candidate drug molecules.

== Awards and honors ==
In 2017, Larabell received the David A. Shirley Award for Outstanding Scientific Achievement at the Advanced Light Source (ALS) user meeting. The award was named in honor of David A, Shirley, a Lab Director and Professor of Chemistry at University of California, Berkeley. Larabell received the award for her work in imaging functional cells through soft x-ray tomography and for her establishment of the National Center for X-Ray Tomography, funded by the National Institutes of Health and the Biological and Environmental Research Division of the Department of Energy.
