= The Other Side of AIDS =

- Directed by: Robin Scovill
- Written by: Robin Scovill
- Produced by: Eric E. Paulson; Robin Scovill
- Cinematography: Robin Scovill
- Edited by: Robin Scovill
- Distributed by: Hazel Wood Pictures
- Release date: June 13, 2004 (Newfest)
- Running time: 87 minutes
- Country: United States
- Language: English

The Other Side of AIDS is a 2004 pseudoscience film by Robin Scovill. Through interviews with prominent AIDS denialists and HIV-positive people who have refused anti-HIV medication, the film makes the claim that HIV is not the cause of AIDS and that HIV treatments are harmful, conclusions which are rejected by medical and scientific consensus. The film was reviewed in Variety and The Hollywood Reporter in 2004, and received additional attention in 2005, when Scovill and Maggiore’s three-year-old daughter died of untreated AIDS.

== Background and content ==
The film opens with the April 23, 1984 press conference of the US Secretary of Health and Human Services, Margaret Heckler, announcing the discovery of HIV. It then moves to the appearance of HIV/AIDS denialist Christine Maggiore at a Foo Fighters concert organized by bassist Nate Mendel in support of Maggiore's group, Alive & Well AIDS Alternatives. The interviewees include Peter Duesberg, a professor "whose stock in the scientific community declined sharply once he began second-guessing the role of HIV" in AIDS, and Christine Maggiore, whose organization "militates against HIV drug treatments." Variety notes that Maggiore is the wife of the director/producer, a fact the film omits. In addition to these two prominent AIDS denialists, the documentary features several HIV-positive people who have refused anti-HIV medications. Along with Maggiore, they blame AIDS deaths in part on negative thinking by victims, a "fatalism" they say is encouraged by support groups. Several also blame AIDS on the "gay lifestyle".

The film does not make a substantial attempt to balance the beliefs of AIDS denialists with the conclusions of medical scientists that HIV causes AIDS. Although two AIDS researchers are interviewed, both reviews of the film remark that these representatives seem to have been cast specifically to portray researchers in a negative light. Variety refers to the two as "fanatics", people chosen by Scovill because their displayed emotions outweigh their "perfectly rational" arguments. AIDS Researcher Julio Montaner, interviewed around the film's Vancouver premiere, said that such emotion comes from fear for patients who may take the film's arguments seriously: "The success of the drugs depends to a high degree on the commitment of the patient to take the medication properly."

In the documentary, produced in 2004, Scovill's HIV-positive wife, Christine Maggiore claimed that she and her two children were healthy despite not taking anti-HIV medications. In 2005, Maggiore's and Scovill's three-year-old daughter, Eliza Jane, died of complications of untreated AIDS. In 2008, Maggiore herself died at the age of 52 after a protracted bout of pneumonia, with several other AIDS-related illnesses.

The executive producer of The Other Side of AIDS was Robert Leppo, a venture capitalist who has also funded the activities of well-known AIDS denialist Peter Duesberg.

== Music ==
The film features a score by Brad Mossman along with the songs "Stacked Actors" and "Learn to Fly" by Foo Fighters, and "Join Life" by Warm Wires.

== Release ==
The Other Side of AIDS premiered on VHS at the New York Lesbian, Gay, Bisexual, & Transgender Film Festival (Newfest) on June 13, 2004, drawing criticism from the AIDS Coalition to Unleash Power (ACT UP). The film had its international premiere at the 2004 Vancouver International Film Festival on 24 September 2004. It was shown at the AFI Los Angeles International Film Festival on November 8, 2004, where it received special mention in the International Documentary category.

== Critical reception ==
The Other Side of AIDS was reviewed in Variety and, briefly, in The Hollywood Reporter.

Variety concluded that while the documentary "fails to present a particularly compelling argument," it succeeds in making the viewer "root for the underdog" by contrasting a long line of sympathetic AIDS denialists with two angry researchers. The review says the strongest argument in the film is an emotional allegation that the government forcibly takes children from HIV-positive parents in the United States, while the weakest point is its tendency to "place the blame [for the AIDS epidemic] exclusively on homosexual behavior."

The Hollywood Reporter states that the film is "a substantial contribution to the international debate about the AIDS epidemic", but faults it for being technically "pedestrian", composed mostly of "talking heads and printed information onscreen".

== See also ==
- Duesberg hypothesis
- House of Numbers: Anatomy of an Epidemic
