= Inventing the AIDS Virus =

1996 book by Peter Duesberg

- Cover
- Author: Peter H. Duesberg
- Language: English
- Subject: AIDS
- Publisher: Regnery Publishing
- Publication date: 1996
- Publication place: United States
- Media type: Print (hardcover and paperback)
- Pages: 722
- ISBN: 0-89526-470-6

Inventing the AIDS Virus is a 1996 book by molecular biologist Peter Duesberg, in which the author argues that HIV does not cause AIDS. Duesberg contends that HIV is a harmless passenger virus and that AIDS is caused by unrelated factors such as drug abuse, antiretroviral medication, chronic malnutrition, poor sanitation, and hemophilia. The unambiguous scientific consensus is that HIV causes AIDS and that Duesberg's claims are incorrect. Duesberg received a negative response from the scientific community for supporting AIDS denialism, misrepresenting and ignoring the scientific evidence that HIV causes AIDS, and for relying upon poor logic and manipulation. The book was also the subject of an authorship dispute with one of his graduate students.

== Summary ==
Duesberg maintains that AIDS is not an infectious disease.

== Publication history ==
Inventing the AIDS Virus was first published in 1996 by Regnery Publishing. The book was initially co-written with Bryan Ellison, one of Duesberg's graduate students at the University of California, Berkeley. However, following a 1994 dispute over manuscript changes, Ellison published the manuscript himself, under the title Why We Will Never Win the War on AIDS, listing himself as the lead author. A dispute between Duesberg and Ellison resulted, with Ellison charging that Duesberg was "doing favors on behalf of several people in the government" who wished to suppress the book.

Ellison also charged Duesberg with "cooperat[ing] with some of the very hostile factors to have me thrown out of school right before I could submit my thesis and get my Ph.D." Duesberg stated that "...since [Ellison] didn't talk to me anymore and didn't show up at the lab, I couldn't pay him anymore." Duesberg and Regnery Publishing sued Ellison for breach of contract and copyright violations, winning a "six-figure verdict" and an injunction against Ellison's manuscript. In a publisher's preface to Inventing the AIDS Virus, Regnery described the dispute in terms of Ellison becoming "disenchanted with Duesberg's and his publisher's insistence on careful documentation."

== Reception ==
=== Scientific response ===
Duesberg's central premise, that HIV is not the cause of AIDS, has been rejected by the scientific community as a form of AIDS denialism.
