= Christine Maggiore =

American HIV denier (1956–2008)

Christine Joy Maggiore (July 25, 1956 – December 27, 2008) was an HIV-positive activist and promoter of HIV/AIDS denialism. She was the founder of Alive & Well AIDS Alternatives, an organization which disputes the link between HIV and AIDS and urges HIV-positive pregnant women to avoid anti-HIV medication. Maggiore authored and self-published the book What If Everything You Thought You Knew about AIDS Was Wrong?

Maggiore's promotion of HIV/AIDS denialism had long been controversial, particularly since her 3-year-old daughter, Eliza Jane Scovill, died of Pneumocystis jirovecii pneumonia, which is an AIDS-defining illness. Consistent with her belief that HIV was harmless, Maggiore had not taken medication to reduce the risk of transmission of HIV to her daughter during pregnancy, and she did not have Eliza Jane tested for HIV during her daughter's lifetime. Maggiore herself died on December 27, 2008, after suffering from AIDS-related conditions.

== Early life and career ==
Born in Chicago, Illinois, Maggiore grew up in Southern California. After graduating with honors from Reseda High School, she worked in advertising and marketing in Los Angeles, California until 1984. She traveled through Europe and North Africa in 1984 before settling in Florence, Italy, where she lived from 1985 to 1987. By the late 1980s, she was earning a high salary at the Alessi International clothing company.

== HIV diagnosis and activism ==
In 1992, as part of a routine medical exam, Maggiore tested positive for HIV, as did a former boyfriend. Subsequently, Maggiore became involved in volunteer work for a number of AIDS charities, including AIDS Project Los Angeles, L.A. Shanti, and Women at Risk. However, following an interaction with prominent AIDS denialist Peter Duesberg in 1994, Maggiore began to question whether HIV causes AIDS. Maggiore came to believe that her positive test may have been due to influenza vaccination, pregnancy, or a common viral infection.

In 1995, Maggiore left the clothing business to work as a freelance consultant for US government export programs. At the same time, she founded Alive & Well AIDS Alternatives, an organization denying the connection between HIV and AIDS and urging pregnant HIV-positive women to avoid HIV medications for themselves and their children. Maggiore herself drew criticism for breast-feeding her children, as breast feeding has been shown to increase the risk of mother-to-child transmission of HIV.

In a 2002 article entitled "My Bout of So-Called AIDS", Maggiore wrote that she had an abnormal Pap smear (a "Grade 3 Pap smear with cervical dysplasia"), which she wrote would qualify her for an AIDS diagnosis. Maggiore's doctors recommended further evaluation with colposcopy; Maggiore writes that she instead followed a naturopathic program and had additional Pap tests performed under an assumed name by another doctor, ultimately obtaining what she described as a normal result.

In a 2005 article in the Los Angeles Times, Maggiore claimed to be in excellent health without taking anti-retroviral treatment. Maggiore's husband and partner, filmmaker Robin Scovill, has repeatedly tested negative despite what Maggiore describes as "a decade of normal, latex-free relations". Their son Charlie, born in 1997, has also tested negative for HIV.

Maggiore's inclusion as an exhibitor at the 13th International AIDS Conference in Durban, South Africa has been criticized by AIDS activists. Her influence on Thabo Mbeki's decision to block medical treatment of HIV-positive pregnant women was criticized following her death, with medical researchers noting that an estimated "330,000 lives were lost to new AIDS infections during the time Mbeki blocked government funding of AZT treatment to mothers."

== Daughter Eliza Jane ==
Christine Maggiore chose not to take antiretroviral drugs or other measures which reduce the risk of mother-to-child transmission of HIV during her pregnancies. Maggiore also breastfed her children, despite evidence that breastfeeding can also transmit HIV from mother to child. Her youngest daughter, Eliza Jane, was never tested for HIV, nor did she or her older brother Charlie receive any of the recommended childhood vaccines. Maggiore later reported Charlie to have tested HIV-negative three times, and asserted that both were in good health.

In April 2005, Eliza Jane, then three and a half years old, became ill with a runny nose. She was seen by two physicians, one of whom reportedly knew of Maggiore's HIV status. Eliza Jane was not tested for HIV and was diagnosed with pneumonia. When Eliza Jane failed to improve, Maggiore took her to see Philip Incao, a holistic practitioner and board member of Maggiore's organization Alive & Well AIDS Alternatives, who described Eliza Jane as only mildly ill and prescribed her amoxicillin for a presumed ear infection.

On May 16, 2005, Eliza Jane collapsed and stopped breathing. She was rushed to Valley Presbyterian Hospital in Van Nuys, California, where, after failed attempts to revive her, she was pronounced dead. An autopsy revealed that Eliza Jane was markedly underweight and under-height (consistent with a chronic illness), exhibited pronounced atrophy of her thymus and other lymphatic organs, and died of pneumonia caused by Pneumocystis jirovecii, a common opportunistic pathogen in people with AIDS and the leading cause of pediatric AIDS deaths.

The postmortem examination of Eliza Jane's brain showed changes consistent with HIV encephalitis; protein components of HIV itself were identified in Eliza Jane's brain tissue via immunohistochemistry. The coroner concluded that Eliza Jane had died of Pneumocystis pneumonia in the setting of advanced AIDS.

Maggiore rejected the coroner's conclusion, ascribing it to political bias and attacking the personal credibility of the senior coroner. Maggiore had the autopsy reviewed by Mohammed Al-Bayati, a veterinary pathologist who holds a Ph.D. in animal disease pathology, but is neither a medical doctor nor board-certified in human pathology. Al-Bayati argued that Eliza Jane had died from an allergic reaction to amoxicillin, a conclusion Maggiore embraced. Al-Bayati's report has been dismissed as medically unsound by independent pathology experts, who agreed with the coroner's conclusion that Eliza Jane had died of complications of untreated AIDS.

=== Reaction to Eliza Jane's death ===
Controversy ensued in the wake of Eliza Jane's death; as Eliza Jane had acquired HIV from Maggiore perinatally or via breastfeeding, her HIV infection might have been prevented had Maggiore taken antiretroviral drugs or avoided breastfeeding, and her death may have been preventable with proper medical care. John Moore, a prominent HIV/AIDS researcher speaking at the 16th International AIDS Conference, described Eliza Jane's death as a concrete example of the human harm that can result from pseudoscientific beliefs such as AIDS denialism:

... infants whose HIV infected mothers listen to AIDS denialists never got the chance to make their own decisions. The Maggiore case received wide publicity. Christine Maggiore is a person who’s proselytized against the use of antiretrovirals to prevent HIV/AIDS. She's a classic AIDS denialist, and she gave birth to a child who died at age three late last year of an AIDS-related infection. The coroner’s report clearly reports that the child died of AIDS. That was another unnecessary death.

During this controversy, Maggiore had held fast to her views on HIV/AIDS and to Al-Bayati's conclusion. She received support from others in the AIDS-denialist community; journalist Celia Farber wrote an article in June 2006 in the independent paper Los Angeles CityBeat arguing Maggiore's case and alleging incompetence, conspiracy, and coverups on the part of the coroner, the mainstream AIDS community, the mainstream media, and the medical community. In particular, Farber claimed that the coroner's office had not disclosed the records of Eliza Jane's HIV serology test, and quoted another denialist who claimed Eliza Jane's total lymphocyte count was elevated at the time of her death.

Eliza Jane's death was investigated by the Los Angeles Police Department and the Los Angeles Department of Child Protective Services as a possible case of medical neglect or child endangerment. In September 2006, the L.A. County District Attorney's office announced that it would not file charges against Christine Maggiore, noting that Maggiore did take her sick child to several physicians. In September 2006, the Medical Board of California filed charges of gross negligence against Eliza Jane's pediatrician, Paul M. Fleiss.

The board argued that Fleiss had failed to test Eliza Jane for HIV (or to document her parents' refusal of testing), failed to counsel Maggiore to avoid breastfeeding given the risk of transmitting HIV, and committed similar violations of standard medical practice in Fleiss' care of a second HIV-positive child. Ultimately, Fleiss conceded a failure to keep adequate medical records and was sanctioned with 35 months of probation, but was not found grossly negligent by the Board.

Maggiore and her husband, Robin Scovill, sued Los Angeles County in 2007 for allegedly violating their daughter's civil rights and privacy by releasing her autopsy report, which indicated that she was HIV-positive. A settlement was reached in 2009.

== Death ==
On December 27, 2008, Maggiore died at the age of 52. She was under a doctor's care and was being treated for what was originally reported as pneumonia. The Los Angeles County coroner's office stated that Maggiore had been treated for pneumonia in the six months prior to her death as well. A doctor familiar with the family noted that anti-HIV drugs could have prevented her death, but Maggiore's fellow AIDS denialists argued that her pneumonia was not AIDS-related and suggested instead that she died as a result of a toxic alternative medicine "holistic cleanse", stress, or the cold and flu. Maggiore's death certificate states that the cause of death was disseminated herpes virus infection and bilateral pneumonia, with oral candidiasis as a contributing cause, all of which is related to HIV infection. The death certificate also states that no autopsy was performed.

== See also ==
- The Other Side of AIDS
- House of Numbers: Anatomy of an Epidemic
- Nikolas Emerson
