= HIV/AIDS in Thailand =

Since HIV/AIDS was first reported in Thailand in 1984, 1,115,415 adults had been infected as of 2008, with 585,830 having died since 1984. 532,522 Thais were living with HIV/AIDS in 2008. In 2009 the adult prevalence of HIV was 1.3%. In 2016, Thailand had the highest prevalence of HIV in Southeast Asia at 1.1 percent, the 40th highest prevalence of 109 nations.

A 2011 UN report identified Thailand as among the eleven countries in the Asia-Pacific with a majority of the world's HIV-infected people.

== HIV/AIDS history and prevalence ==
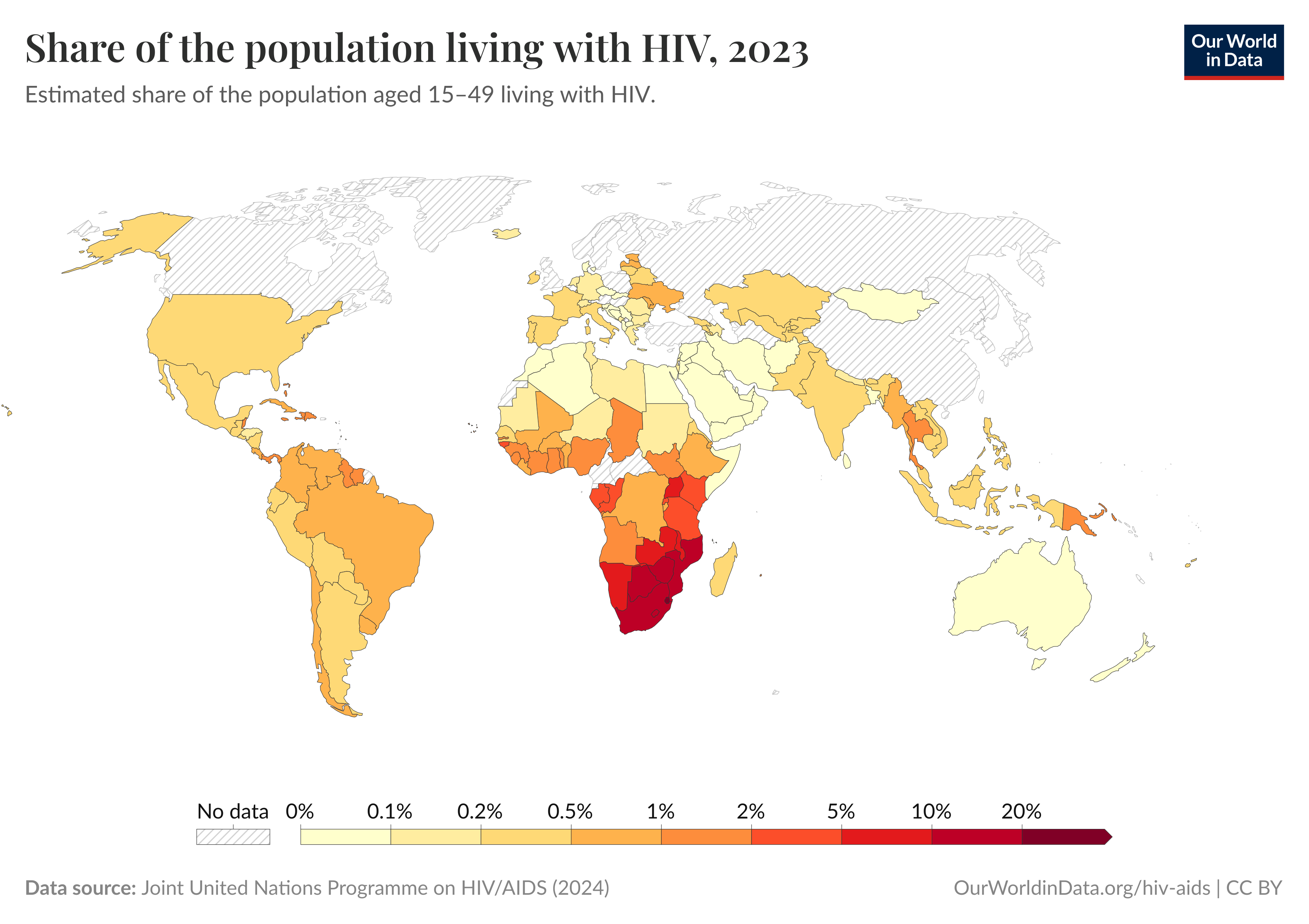
A map of global HIV prevalence, 2023

After Thailand's first case of [imported] AIDS was reported in 1984—in a Thai student who returned from college in the United States—and after the first laboratory detection of HIV in 1985, starting in early 1988, HIV infection spread explosively in sequential waves in one risk group after another.

Information on the prevalence of AIDS in Thailand was initially suppressed due to the concern of affecting the economy of the tourist industry. In 1991, the government adopted a strategy to combat the disease, and in recent years, the number of new infections has declined. According to Avert, the second-highest prevalence of HIV in Asia was in Thailand in 2002, with a rate of 1.8 percent. HIV prevalence had remained the same from 2003 to 2005 (1.4 percent). By 2017, HIV prevalence had declined to 1.1 percent, with 75 percent having access to antiretroviral therapy (ART).

Thailand's early cases of HIV/AIDS occurred primarily among gay men. The virus then spread rapidly to injecting drug users (IDUs), followed by prostitutes. Between 2003 and 2005, there were increases in HIV prevalence from 17 to 28 percent among men who have sex with men in Bangkok. Prevalence among IDUs still ranges from 30 to 50 percent.

In 2005, more than 40 percent of new infections were among women, the majority of whom were infected through intercourse with long-term lovers. Money and a low level of condom use, due to women's activity in the illegal sex trade are factors responsible for the spread of HIV among this group. Although the prevalence of HIV/AIDS in Thailand has declined, the epidemic has moved to the general population and there is a greater need to match prevention efforts with recent changes in the epidemic.

In 2011, IDUs in Thailand were among the most vulnerable to HIV/AIDS, and numbered between 40,000 and 97,300.

== Dynamics ==
Several factors had put Thailand at risk of a resurgence of HIV/AIDS cases. Awareness of HIV status was low in 2006. For example, in a 2006 study, 80 percent of HIV-positive men who have sex with men (MSM) had never been tested or thought they were HIV-negative. By 2017, awareness of HIV status had risen to 98 percent. A large portion of IDUs—35 percent according to one study—use non-sterile injecting equipment.

Other research has noted an increased trend of erratic condom use by female prostitutes. In some cases, women selling sex reported using a condom in just over one half of commercial sex encounters. Finally, premarital sex, once taboo, is increasingly common among young Thais, only 20 to 30 percent of whom use condoms consistently, according to the United Nations Development Program.

Thailand has a high tuberculosis (TB) burden, with 63 new cases per 100,000 people in 2005. Approximately 7.6 percent of TB patients are also infected with HIV. HIV-TB co-infections pose a challenge to treatment provision and care for both diseases.

== National response ==
A 2008 report by the United States Agency for International Development, assessed that Thailand's initial response to the epidemic was weak. However, since the National AIDS Control Program was moved from the Ministry of Public Health to the Office of the Prime Minister in 1991, Thailand's HIV/AIDS prevention efforts have been recognized as among the world's most successful. The Ninth National Economic and Social Development Plan (2002–2006) emphasized the adoption of a human-centered approach to bring about reform through the public health system, especially the health care system.

Thailand's policy on AIDS has worked toward educating its citizens on HIV/AIDS and prevention measures; developing a system of medical, public health, social, and consultation services to improve the quality of life of persons living with HIV/AIDS (PLWHA); developing medical biotechnology, medicine, and AIDS vaccination research; and working with all parties involved, such as the government and private sector, to prevent and alleviate the HIV/AIDS situation.

Thailand's HIV/AIDS activities include conducting a public education campaign targeting the general public and most-at-risk populations (MARPs), improving sexually transmitted infection (STI) treatment, discouraging men from visiting sex workers, promoting condom use, and requiring sex workers to receive monthly STI tests and carry records of the test results. The Thai sex industry has become the major focus of campaigns aimed at HIV prevention and treatment due to the perception that prostitution has been responsible for the spread of AIDS.

In 2004, Thailand received a third-round grant from the Global Fund to Fight AIDS, Tuberculosis and Malaria to prevent HIV/AIDS among IDUs and increase care and support for them. Objectives of the grant are to train peer leaders within IDU communities; create harm-reduction centers; educate health care providers, police, prison staff, and policymakers; and provide peer-based outreach, education, counseling, referral services, and HIV testing support. The US Government provides one-third of the Global Fund's contributions.

Since the change of government in 2006, Thailand has reinvigorated its HIV/AIDS prevention and control efforts. In 2007, Thailand adopted a three-year strategic plan that focuses on scaling up HIV prevention efforts, particularly for people most likely to be exposed to HIV and for difficult-to-reach populations. Thus, the government continues to strive for achieving universal access to treatment. As of the end of 2006, 88 percent of HIV-infected people were receiving ART, according to UNAIDS.

Early in 2007, the government announced that it would, if necessary, break patents on drugs to treat HIV. Thailand's Government Pharmaceutical Organization will produce the antiretroviral drug efavirenz after receiving WHO approval in 2018. GPO's product costs 180 baht per bottle of thirty 600 mg tablets. The imported version retails for more than 1,000 baht per bottle. GPO will devote 2.5 percent of its manufacturing capacity to make 42 million efavirenz pills in 2018, allowing it to serve export markets as well as domestic.

== Research ==
The American Centers for Disease Control and Prevention (CDC) conducted a study in partnership with the Thailand Ministry of Public Health to ascertain the effectiveness of providing people who inject drugs illicitly with daily doses of the anti-retroviral drug Tenofovir as a prevention measure. The results of the study were released in mid-June 2013 and revealed a 48.9% reduced incidence of the virus among the group of subjects who received the drug, in comparison to the control group who received a placebo. The Principal Investigator of the study stated in the Lancet medical journal: "We now know that pre-exposure prophylaxis can be a potentially vital option for HIV prevention in people at very high risk for infection, whether through sexual transmission or injecting drug use."

A 2011 study done by AIDS Care investigated substance use of HIV risk behaviors among kathoey sex workers in Bangkok, Thailand.

== See also ==
- Prostitution in Thailand
- Health in Thailand
- List of HIV/AIDS cases and deaths registered by region
