= House of Numbers =

House of Numbers may refer to:

- House of Numbers, a 1957 novel by Jack Finney
- House of Numbers (1957 film), an American film noir based on the novel
- House of Numbers: Anatomy of an Epidemic, a 2009 American documentary on HIV/AIDS
