= House of Numbers: Anatomy of an Epidemic =

- Directed by: Brent Leung
- Written by: Llewellyn Chapman
- Produced by: Brent Leung; Ursula Rowan
- Starring: Brent Leung
- Cinematography: Matt Coale; Pouria Montazeri
- Edited by: Brent Leung; Ursula Rowan
- Music by: Joel Diamond
- Release date: 21 June 2009
- Running time: 90 minutes
- Country: United States
- Language: English

House of Numbers: Anatomy of an Epidemic is a 2009 film directed, produced, and hosted by Brent Leung. The film argues that human immunodeficiency virus (HIV) is harmless and does not cause acquired immune deficiency syndrome (AIDS), a position known as AIDS denialism. The film's claims of impartiality have been widely rejected by scientists, and the film's claims about HIV and AIDS have been dismissed as pseudoscience and conspiracy theory masquerading as even-handed examination.

A group of scientists interviewed for the film later complained that their comments had been misrepresented and taken out of context, and that the film promotes pseudoscience. The film also interviews Christine Maggiore, a prominent AIDS denialist who later died following AIDS-related conditions.

== Production and content ==
Leung has declined to discuss funding for the film except to state that funders came from "all over the world". In the film, Leung interviews a range of scientists and AIDS denialists, most notably Christine Maggiore. At the time of filming, Maggiore was HIV-positive and appeared healthy, despite her refusal to take anti-retroviral medication, which mainstream medicine uses to slow down the rate at which HIV destroys CD4+ T-cells. As she said in the film, she refused to take the medication and did not have her daughter, Eliza Jane Scovill, tested, or provide her with medication, because she believed HIV did not cause AIDS. Rather, she believed that the medication itself caused AIDS. Maggiore's relative health, despite years of infection, is used by the film to support the idea that anti-retrovirals are unnecessary to combat, and may themselves cause, AIDS. Maggiore died of complications of advanced untreated AIDS.

== Release and aftermath ==
The film was screened at small film festivals, including the London Raindance Film Festival. Both Maggiore and her daughter died of AIDS-related complications before the film's release, although their deaths are mentioned only in small print during the closing credits along with a claim that Maggiore's death was "unrelated to HIV." Maggiore's daughter died in September 2005 of AIDS-related opportunistic infections, although Maggiore rejected the cause of death and argued that the coroner's report was politically motivated. Maggiore herself died in December 2008 from AIDS-related opportunistic infections.

Eighteen scientists interviewed in the film stated that their answers to Leung's questions were selectively edited to convey a false sense that the scientific community disagrees on basic facts about HIV/AIDS. Two interviewees, Neil Constantine and Robin Weiss, cite examples supporting the allegation that Leung misrepresented their words in a "surely intentional" manner. Brent Leung denied taking quotes out of context.

== Reception ==
The film's promotion of AIDS denialism, a pseudoscientific movement implicated in thousands of deaths, drew criticism and anger. The New York Times characterized the film as "a weaselly support pamphlet for AIDS denialists", "willfully ignorant", and "a globe-trotting pseudo-investigation that should raise the hackles of anyone with even a glancing knowledge of the basic rules of reasoning." The Wall Street Journal cited the film as part of "this season's fashion in conspiracy theories." The Portland Oregonian criticized Leung for "not being entirely honest with viewers," and decried the film's reliance on "selective editing, anomalies and anecdotes, unsupported conclusions ... and suppression of inconvenient facts."

Reaction from the scientific community was similarly negative. Lancet Infectious Diseases criticized the film's arguments, calling them a "toxic combination of misrepresentation and sophistry." AIDSTruth.org, a website created by HIV researchers to address AIDS denialism, criticized the film for concealing its "agenda behind a false veneer of honest inquiry", and published a rebuttal to some of the film's claims. Ben Goldacre, writing in The Guardian, described House of Numbers as "a dreary and pernicious piece of Aids denialist propaganda."

In February 2014 several people involved with the film filed DMCA notices against a YouTube science blogger named Myles Power, who had made a video series debunking claims made in the film. Power argued that the film was fair use as criticism and education. Several commentators described the notices as attempted censorship by copyright. The videos were restored several days later.

== See also ==
- Expelled: No Intelligence Allowed
- The Other Side of AIDS
- Duesberg hypothesis
- Eliza Jane Scovill
