= Paul M. Fleiss =

American physician

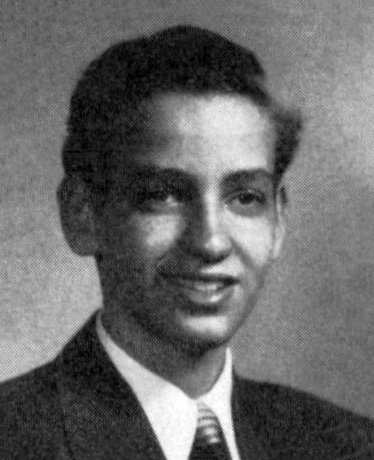
- High school yearbook portrait, 1951
- Born: Paul Murray Fleiss; September 8, 1933; United States
- Died: July 19, 2014 (aged 80); United States
- Education: Wayne State University; University of California, Irvine; UCLA
- Occupations: Pediatrician, author
- Spouse: Elissa Ash
- Children: Heidi Fleiss (daughter)

Paul Murray Fleiss (September 8, 1933 – July 19, 2014) was an American pediatrician and author known for his unconventional medical views. Fleiss was a popular and sought-after pediatrician in the Greater Los Angeles area, both among poor and middle-class patients living near his Los Feliz office and among Southern California celebrities. Fleiss was a breastfeeding and anti-circumcision advocate. He recommended but did not insist upon childhood vaccinations, and stated he could be "convinced either way" as to whether HIV causes AIDS. In 1995, he pleaded guilty to conspiracy and bank fraud in relation to his daughter Heidi's prostitution ring.

== History ==
Fleiss initially trained as a pharmacist and osteopath. He relocated from Detroit to California to take advantage of 1962 legislation allowing an osteopath to convert his degree to an MD. He earned his B.S. in pharmacy from Wayne State University, his D.O. from the University of California, Irvine, and his M.P.H. from UCLA.

Fleiss was the father of "Hollywood madam" Heidi Fleiss. In 1995, he pleaded guilty to charges of conspiracy and bank fraud. He helped Heidi launder hundreds of thousands of dollars by lying on her loan application and falsely claiming that she was an employee of his medical practice. He was sentenced to one day in prison, three years' probation, 625 hours of community service and a $50,000 fine. Following the felony convictions, the Medical Board of California placed him on probation for 1 year and publicly reprimanded him for "unprofessional conduct" and "dishonesty".

Heidi Fleiss was the subject of a 1996 made-for-TV movie entitled The Good Doctor: The Paul Fleiss Story, in which Paul Fleiss (played by Michael Gross) was portrayed sympathetically, as the victim of his daughter Heidi's machinations. The New York Times noted that "the sweeping inaccuracies in 'The Good Doctor: The Paul Fleiss Story' evidently didn't hurt its ratings", and the film was subsequently retitled The Making of a Hollywood Madam, and shown on cable television.

== Personal life ==
Fleiss was married to Elissa Ash until their divorce. He had four daughters, Heidi, Amy, Shana, and Kim, and two sons, Jesse and Jason, the latter of whom predeceased his father.

Paul Fleiss died July 19, 2014, aged 80, in Los Angeles, from undisclosed causes.

== Medical views and opinions ==
Fleiss was known for his unconventional medical views. He was a proponent of the "family bed". While he recommended that his patients receive vaccines, he did not insist upon it. He was quoted by the Los Angeles Times as stating that he 'could be "convinced either way" on whether HIV causes AIDS'. Fleiss was a breastfeeding advocate and anti-circumcision activist, or intactivist. He was the author or co-author of three books: Sweet Dreams (2001), Your Premature Baby Comes Home with Juliette M. Alsobrooks (2006), and What Your Doctor May Not Tell You about Circumcision with Frederick M. Hodges (2003).

== Pediatric practice ==
Fleiss was described in the Los Angeles Times as "everyone's favorite baby doctor" and having been "one of Southern California's most sought-after physicians" for thirty years. Sometimes described in the media as a "pediatrician to the stars", he counted numerous celebrities or their children among his patients.

In 2005, Fleiss was investigated for his role in the death, from untreated AIDS, of Eliza Jane Scovill, the daughter of AIDS denialist Christine Maggiore, who was HIV-positive. Against standard medical practice, Scovill was never tested for HIV, and Fleiss was investigated by the Medical Board of California for gross negligence in her care as well as in the care of a second child who was also HIV-positive.

After receiving over 100 letters of support for Fleiss from patients and parents, the medical board reached a settlement in which Fleiss conceded a failure to maintain adequate medical records and agreed to regular review by an outside physician acting as a monitor.
