= Alive & Well AIDS Alternatives =

AIDS denialist organisation

Alive & Well AIDS Alternatives (formerly HEAL, Health Education AIDS Liaison) is a 501(c) non-profit organization of AIDS denialists. The organization's stated mission is to "present information that raises questions about the accuracy of HIV tests, the safety and effectiveness of AIDS drug treatments, and the validity of most common assumptions about HIV and AIDS." The organization's founder, Christine Maggiore (who died from AIDS-related complications in 2008) estimated in 2005 that the organization had assisted about 50 HIV-positive mothers in developing legal strategies to avoid having their children tested or treated for HIV.

== Founding ==
Alive & Well AIDS Alternatives was founded in 1995 by Christine Maggiore, who had tested HIV-positive in 1992. Although Maggiore was initially active in the AIDS community, providing AIDS and HIV education through AIDS Project Los Angeles, she later came to question her diagnosis. Ultimately, she came to believe that HIV was not the cause of AIDS, and formed Alive & Well to expound her views.

Maggiore became a controversial figure following the death of her 3-year-old daughter, Eliza Jane Scovill. Eliza Jane was never tested for HIV and died on May 16, 2005, of Pneumocystis pneumonia in the setting of advanced AIDS. Maggiore did not believe that Eliza Jane had AIDS and instead attributed her death to an allergic reaction to amoxicillin. Mohammed Al-Bayati, a board member of Alive & Well and a veterinary toxicologist, issued his own report arguing that a drug reaction, not AIDS, was responsible for Eliza Jane's death. Eliza Jane's death was the subject of reports by ABC Primetime Live and the Los Angeles Times; several independent medical experts contacted by these programs agreed unequivocally that Eliza Jane had died of complications of AIDS.

On December 29, 2008, Maggiore died at the age of 52. She was under a doctor's care and was being treated for pneumonia. A doctor familiar with the family suggests that anti-HIV drugs could have prevented her death, but Maggiore's fellow AIDS denialists state that her pneumonia was not related to AIDS and that she died as a result of an alternative medicine treatment.

== Members ==
The advisory board of Alive & Well AIDS Alternatives includes many prominent AIDS denialists, such as Harvey Bialy, Peter Duesberg, Eleni Papadopulos-Eleopulos, Gavin de Becker, Peggy O'Mara of Mothering magazine, and David Rasnick, and Nobel prize winner Kary Mullis.

The organization's membership has been subject to attrition as members die from HIV/AIDS, or leave after noticing the heightened rate at which fellow members do so.

== Advocacy ==
Although there is extensive scientific evidence to the contrary, Alive & Well AIDS Alternatives promotes the viewpoint that HIV is not the cause of AIDS. The organization also espouses the viewpoints that:

- HIV tests are inaccurate.
- AIDS is not a major problem in Africa.
- Pregnant women should not take antiretroviral medication to prevent HIV transmission to their children.
- The syndrome of AIDS in fact results from malnutrition, mental stress, AZT, recreational drug use among gay men, or other causes.
- The mainstream scientific community's efforts to promote AIDS awareness and develop effective treatments are examples of fearmongering and are compromised by ties to the pharmaceutical industry.

Alive & Well AIDS Alternatives encourages the use of alternative therapies for HIV-positive people in place of mainstream treatments. Examples of treatments advanced by Alive & Well as substitutes for antiretroviral therapy include herbal and nutritional therapy, naturopathic medicine, homeopathy, therapeutic enemas, acupuncture, and "imagery".

Scientists and AIDS activists have decried the activities of Alive & Well AIDS Alternatives and other AIDS denialist organizations, arguing that by persuading people to forgo proven treatments they are causing unnecessary and preventable deaths. Speaking at the XVI International AIDS Conference, leading HIV/AIDS researcher John Moore stated:

...infants whose HIV infected mothers listen to AIDS denialists never got the chance to make their own decisions. The Maggiore case received wide publicity. Christine Maggiore is a person who’s proselytized against the use of antiretrovirals to prevent HIV/AIDS. She’s a classic AIDS denialist, and she gave birth to a child who died at age three late last year of an AIDS-related infection... that was another unnecessary death.

Alive & Well AIDS Alternatives encourages people to "get involved" by passing out literature, donating copies of Christine Maggiore's book What If Everything You Knew About AIDS Was Wrong?, contacting radio and television shows, writing to newspapers and magazines, and starting their own discussion groups.
