= Death of Eliza Jane Scovill =

American AIDS victim (2001 – 2005)

Eliza Jane Scovill (December 3, 2001 – May 16, 2005) was the daughter of AIDS denialist Christine Maggiore, an HIV-positive activist who publicly questioned the link between HIV and AIDS, and supported HIV-positive pregnant women who want to avoid taking anti-HIV medication. Eliza Jane's May 16, 2005 death from AIDS, at the age of three and a half, sparked a social and legal controversy over her mother's decision not to take precautions during pregnancy and breastfeeding to prevent transmission of the virus, and her parents' decision to not have her treated for HIV infection during her life.

== AIDS diagnosis and death ==
In 1992, Eliza Jane's mother, Christine Maggiore, tested positive for HIV. She subsequently became involved in volunteer work for a number of AIDS charities, including AIDS Project Los Angeles, L.A. Shanti, and Women at Risk. However, following an interaction with prominent AIDS denialist Peter Duesberg in 1994, she began to question whether HIV causes AIDS. Maggiore came to believe that her positive test may have been due to flu shots, pregnancy, or a common viral infection.

Maggiore chose not to take antiretroviral drugs or other measures which reduce the risk of mother-to-child transmission of HIV during her pregnancies. Maggiore also breast-fed her children, despite evidence that breast-feeding can also transmit HIV from mother to child. Her younger child, Eliza Jane, was never tested for HIV, nor did she or her older brother Charlie receive any of the recommended childhood vaccines. (Maggiore later reported Charlie to have tested HIV-negative three times.) Maggiore discussed her beliefs as an AIDS dissident on Air America Radio in March 2005, stating that "...our children have excellent records of health. They've never had respiratory problems, flus, intractable colds, ear infections, nothing. So, our choices, however radical they may seem, are extremely well-founded."

Several weeks after this interview, in April 2005, Eliza Jane became ill with a runny nose. She was seen by a physician from the family's pediatric practice, who documented a normal physical exam. Several days later, Maggiore took Eliza Jane to see another pediatrician, Jay Gordon, who felt she had a mild ear infection. Reportedly, Gordon was aware of Maggiore's HIV status, but did not have Eliza Jane tested for HIV. According to the hospital report, filed just after Eliza Jane's death and based upon an interview with Maggiore, Eliza Jane "had been diagnosed with pneumonia" in the weeks preceding her death.

When Eliza Jane failed to improve, Maggiore took her to see Philip Incao, a holistic practitioner and board member of Maggiore's AIDS-denialist organization Alive & Well AIDS Alternatives. Incao stated that Eliza Jane appeared "mildly ill... no way I considered her in danger... she did not act as a patient acts if she's severely ill or in danger." On May 14, 2005, Incao prescribed amoxicillin for a presumed ear infection.

The following day, Eliza Jane became lethargic and vomited several times. While Maggiore was on the phone with Incao, Eliza Jane collapsed and stopped breathing. She was rushed by ambulance to Valley Presbyterian Hospital in Van Nuys, California. Physicians attempted to resuscitate Eliza Jane, but were unsuccessful. According to the hospital report, a "chest x-ray revealed pneumonia," and Eliza Jane was pronounced dead at 5:40 AM on May 16, 2005.

== Cause of death ==
An autopsy was performed. The senior deputy medical examiner for the Los Angeles County Coroner's Office found that Eliza Jane was markedly underweight and under-height, consistent with a chronic illness, and that she had pronounced atrophy of her thymus and other lymphatic organs. Examination of her lungs showed infection with Pneumocystis jirovecii, a common opportunistic pathogen in people with AIDS and the leading cause of pediatric AIDS deaths. The post-mortem examination of Eliza Jane's brain showed changes consistent with HIV encephalitis; protein components of HIV itself were identified in Eliza Jane's brain tissue via immunohistochemistry.

Based on the clinical information, the immunohistochemical documentation of HIV in Eliza Jane's brain, the evidence of pronounced immunosuppression, and the isolation of the opportunistic pathogen Pneumocystis jirovecii from Eliza Jane's lungs, the coroner concluded that Eliza Jane had died of Pneumocystis pneumonia in the setting of advanced AIDS. This conclusion was described by the coroner as "unequivocal".

Maggiore rejected the coroner's conclusion, ascribing it to political bias and attacking the personal credibility of the senior coroner, James Ribe. Maggiore retained a board member of the organization she founded named Alive & Well AIDS Alternatives, toxicologist Mohammed Al-Bayati, to review the autopsy report. Al-Bayati holds a B.S. in veterinary medicine from the University of Baghdad, an M.S. from the University of Cairo, and a Ph.D. in comparative pathology from UC Davis. He is a pseudoscientist. He is not a physician nor is he board-certified in human pathology. He is the author of a book entitled Get All The Facts: HIV Does Not Cause AIDS.

Al-Bayati released a report concluding that Eliza Jane had not died from AIDS or pneumocystis pneumonia, but from an allergic reaction to amoxicillin. Maggiore embraced Al-Bayati's conclusion that a reaction to amoxicillin was responsible, stating, "I believe the unfortunate irony in this situation is that the one time that we were asked to and that we complied with mainstream medicine, we inadvertently gave our daughter something that took her life."

Al-Bayati's report has been dismissed as both biased and medically unsound. Both the Los Angeles Times and ABC PrimeTime Live consulted independent experts in pathology about Eliza Jane's case; these experts agreed unequivocally with the coroner's conclusion that AIDS and resultant Pneumocystis pneumonia were the cause of death, and rejected Al-Bayati's report.

== Criticism and controversy ==
Following Eliza Jane Scovill's death, Maggiore's beliefs and advocacy became points of controversy. Maggiore had held fast to her belief that HIV does not cause AIDS, and that Eliza Jane died of a reaction to amoxicillin. She submitted a letter to the Los Angeles Times alleging factual errors and omissions in their articles on Eliza Jane; the Times did not print the letter, stating that "If facts in an article are wrong, a correction would be published. However, no correction is warranted in this case."

Others point to the evidence which indicates that Eliza Jane acquired AIDS from Maggiore perinatally or via breast feeding, that Eliza's HIV infection might have been prevented had Maggiore taken antiretroviral drugs or avoided breast feeding, that Eliza Jane's death was due to complications of AIDS, and that her death may have been preventable with proper medical care.

John Moore, a prominent HIV/AIDS researcher speaking at the 16th International AIDS Conference, described Eliza Jane's death as a concrete example of the human harm that can result from pseudoscientific beliefs such as AIDS denialism:

...infants whose HIV infected mothers listen to AIDS denialists never got the chance to make their own decisions. The Maggiore case received wide publicity. Christine Maggiore is a person who's proselytized against the use of antiretrovirals to prevent HIV/AIDS. She's a classic AIDS denialist, and she gave birth to a child who died at age three late last year of an AIDS-related infection. The coroner's report clearly reports that the child died of AIDS. That was another unnecessary death.

Maggiore's inclusion as an exhibitor at the 13th International AIDS Conference in Durban, South Africa has been criticized by AIDS activists.

Maggiore's influence on Thabo Mbeki's decision to block funding of medical treatment of HIV-positive pregnant women was criticized following her death, with medical researchers noting a Harvard study which estimated "330,000 lives were lost to new AIDS infections during the time Mbeki blocked government funding of AZT treatment to mothers."

== Legal ramifications ==
The death of Eliza Jane was investigated by the Los Angeles Police Department and the Los Angeles Department of Child Protective Services as a possible case of medical neglect or child endangerment. On September 15, 2006, the LA County District Attorney's office announced that it would not file charges against Christine Maggiore, noting the difficulty in proving negligence given that Maggiore did take her sick child to several physicians.

In September 2006, the Medical Board of California filed charges of gross negligence against one of these physicians, Paul Fleiss, who was Eliza Jane's pediatrician, alleging a failure to test Eliza Jane for HIV (or to document her parents' refusal of testing), a failure to counsel Maggiore to avoid breast-feeding at any time during the three years Maggiore breast-fed her daughter, given the risk of transmitting HIV, and similar violations of standard medical practice in Fleiss's care of a second HIV-positive child.

In September 2007, the Medical Board of California issued its decision in the Fleiss case, effective October 8, 2007. The Board revoked Fleiss's medical license but stayed this action in favor of a 35-month probation period during which Fleiss must submit to regular monitoring, pay costs, notify insurance and hospitals of the decision against him, and take continuing medical education (CME) classes and record-keeping courses. He is not permitted to supervise Physician Assistants and has affirmed the practice of referring HIV-positive patients to a specialist.

In an admonition letter dated September 13, 2007, an Inquiry Panel of the Colorado State Board of Medical Examiners issued its finding that Philip Incao's "care and treatment and lack of timely documentation" in the case of Eliza Jane Scovill "falls below the generally accepted standards of medical practice". The Panel warned Incao that any further instances of such behavior could result in "formal disciplinary proceedings against your license to practice medicine".

Maggiore and her husband, Robin Scovill, sued Los Angeles County in 2007 for allegedly violating their daughter's civil rights and privacy by releasing her autopsy report, which indicated that she was HIV-positive. A $15,000 settlement was reached in 2009.
