= Nikolas Emerson =

- Died: March 2, 2006; Bangor, Maine

Nikolas Emerson was an American child at the center of a controversial legal dispute between Valerie Wilks and the state of Maine over whether Wilks had the right not to treat her child with AZT, the first antiretroviral medication used to treat HIV/AIDS.

== Background ==
When Valerie discovered she was HIV-positive while she was pregnant, she had her oldest children tested for HIV. Two children, Tia and Nikolas, tested positive for the virus. Following the diagnoses, Valerie and Tia, Nikolas's sister, began AZT treatment. In January 1997, during an on-and-off struggle with pneumonia, Tia suffered a bad reaction to AZT and died at four-years-old. Valerie believed AZT caused Tia's death and chose to stop giving Nikolas the drug as soon as he began to suffer negative side effects. Valerie refused a new three-drug AIDS remedy that a specialist, Dr. John Milliken, recommended for Nikolas, stating "I don't want my son to go through the same pain my daughter did." Two months following her decision, Dr. Milliken wrote a report to their primary care physician, Dr. Jean Benson, and the state of Maine recommending AZT treatment for Nikolas and recommending she take an option that required her to lose partial custody so the state could require treatment. Under this arrangement, Valerie would have retained residential custody of her son and Nikolas would undergo state-mandated treatment for HIV/AIDS.

== Trial ==
The Maine Department of Human Services sought custody of Nikolas over the lack of treatment. Valerie argued in court that Nikolas was currently healthy and argued against the use of AZT, saying, "I think the medication on the market now will be unheard of in five years" and "Why should we be guinea pigs?". Valerie viewed Nikolas's AIDS diagnosis as a terminal diagnosis and attempted to argue in court that the treatments would not meaningfully extend his life. In the days leading up to the case, Valerie had planned to flee with Nikolas and her other children if the state took custody of him.

In 1998, Judge Douglas Clapp ruled that Valerie Wilks could not be compelled to give Nikolas AZT and that the state could not take limited custody of him to force treatment. He stated, "The state of Maine is now in no position to tell her, in the case of her unique experience, that she is wrong in her current judgment to wait for better and more reliable treatment methods."

The state chose not to appeal the case because the boy was currently healthy, though the commissioner, Kevin Concannon, said the agency would monitor the child's health. There is no evidence the state followed up on Nikolas's health following the case, as the state declined to comment to the news media following his death.

== Death ==
Nikolas died at the age of 11 in 2006. The family did not state whether the cause was AIDS-related or not. Valerie's mother, Patricia Zebulske, stated, "When Valerie is ready to share, she will. It’s just a little too early for her."

The family held a private funeral for Nikolas.

== Legacy ==
The legal case surrounding Nikolas attracted the attention of HIV/AIDS denialist organizations, such as the Group for the Reappraisal of the AIDS Hypothesis. Two doctors testified during the trial that the AIDS treatment cocktail would have made the child worse off than if he had not undergone treatment.

Nikolas's trial and later death were seen as important in balancing the rights of a child and his parent. His case was also viewed as an argument over the value of treatment when drugs cause significant side effects and negative quality of life.

== See also ==
- Children's rights
- Christine Maggiore
- History of HIV/AIDS
- Jacobson v. Massachusetts
- Parents' rights movement
