= List of HIV/AIDS cases and deaths registered by region =

This article lists the reported and registered HIV/AIDS cases by reporting region. A region may refer to a country or subdivision, national HIV records are often complicated incomplete or even nonexistent. This list is only documented cases, not for estimated cases. Estimated case numbers differ in significant ways: estimates are available for all areas for all years unlike hard records, and estimates attempt to quantify an epidemic in current time, whereas registered/documented cases are behind the curve, they have lag time to detection and represent the past rather than current situation.

Documentation of HIV transmission often present with significant holes and inconsistencies. In the earlier years of the epidemic, especially in Africa, health systems where completely overwhelmed and millions of people died without government recordkeeping, there is little way of knowing how many people contracted HIV, to get around the problem to get the total cumulative number of HIV infections, HIV death data is taken into account in the table below where those living with HIV are summed with those died of HIV for a cumulative HIV infection figure, nevertheless, the data of credible death estimates exist only for the specific years where available. In spite of data quality issues, all these types of data help to create an epidemiological picture.

US CDC has changed reporting standards for AIDS related deaths (again in 2014); HIV case reporting is not uniform among states that also implement their own surveillance. Globally, some 35.3 million are living with HIV/AIDS, World Health Organization (WHO), an estimated 36 million people have died since the first cases were reported in 1981 and 1.6 million people died of HIV/AIDS in 2012. Using WHO statistics, in 2012 the number of people living with HIV was growing at a faster rate (1.98%) than worldwide human population growth (1.1% annual), and the cumulative number of people with HIV is growing at roughly three times faster (3.22%). The costs of treatment is significantly increasing burden on healthcare systems when budgets remain stagnant, causing cutoffs in funding to healthcare providers.

We're right at that razor edge. Unless you dramatically change the infection rate...the epidemic is actually going to expand rather than shrink. —Deborah Birx, Obama administration global AIDS coordinator

== List ==
Color code: Countries/regions in light blue have latest year HIV cases exceeding 10% of cumulative total, deep blue exceeding 20%, and pink exceeding 30%. These colors suggest an outbreak or insufficient reporting. If HIV estimates are correct, government efforts to report are still hugely inadequate, only 1 in 3 HIV cases have ever been reported globally, and 1 in 7 deaths (using this list as reference). Note: Deaths in US jurisdictions include all causes. Documented deaths may be estimated, please consult individual references sources. Word of caution on data below: Higher numbers on this list often reflect better reporting and data, it does not necessarily indicate (nor imply) a larger epidemic. Reporting of HIV cases and deaths are quite often delayed by years, data here can mask HIV epidemics.

=== Over 100,000 cases ===
Country or region	Documented cases of HIV (cumulative)	ARV/ART enrolled or documented cases of AIDS (cumulative)	Documented deaths (cumulative)	HIV cases past 12 mo. before reported date	Figures as of**	Updated every
UN WORLD Estimated cases	76,100,000 (est)	20.9m on ARV	35,000,000 (est)	1,800,000(est)	Dec 2017	annual
Total Cases accounted for in this table (sum)	~37,000,000	~8,300,000 on ARV	19,200,000			N/A
Governments HIV documentation gap (UN Est minus Table Data)	39,000,000 cases undocumented		15,800,000 deaths undocumented			N/A
South Africa	at least 5,691,700 (sum 2010 ARV+referenced deaths)	3,140,000 eligible ART (2010) 1,400,000 on ART	282,578 (2010 only), 2,308,200 (1996–2006)		May 2011	Random
Nigeria	at least 5,011,181	2,021,181 of which 359,181 enrolled ART (2010), 1,662,000 on waiting list	2.99 million (1983–2012)	388,864	2011	Random
India	at least 3,725,544 (to 2012)	1,735,544 AIDS-dec'12 (810,339 on ART-Sep'14)	1,990,000(2000 to 2012)**	189,068 (to 2012)	Dec 2012	annual?
Tanzania	est. 3,600,000	432,532 taking ART	est. 1,800,000	est. 200,000	Dec 2012	random
Mozambique	at least 3,028,174 (1,578,174 living dec '13)	454,000 on ARV (2013)	60,439 to 80,000 (2006 only) 1,450,000 (1997-2012)	117,404 (2013)	Dec 2013	random
Uganda	at least 2,650,351 (sum of waiting list+referenced deaths)	1,447,859 on ARV waiting list 6/14 714,774 taking ARV, 12/14)	942,492 (1983–2001) and 260,000 (2011-2014)	127,000 (2014)	Dec 2014	random
Zimbabwe	at least 2,550,000	1.2 million of which 565,675 ART enrolled (2013)	1,350,000 (2002-2012 only)	60,000 (jan-oct 2010)	Dec 2013	random
Kenya	at least 2,154,027 (sum on ARV+ref deaths)	604,027 taking ARV (Dec 2012)	1.55 million (to 2011)	N/A	Dec 2012	random
Ethiopia	at least 1,888,137	288,137 on ART (2012)	1.6 million (to 2010)		Dec 2012	random
United States and dependent areas	1,651,454 (sum living in 2013 with HIV plus cumulative deaths, 2014)	1,241,981 (AIDS only)	698,219	44,784	Dec 2014	annual?
Thailand	1,178,646 total (2012), 460,000 living (2013)	246,000 ARV (2013)	714,603 (2012)	8,312 (2013)	Dec 2012	random
Russia	933,419	125,623 on ARV (Dec 2012)	205,538 as of Nov 2015	93,000 (2015)	Dec 2014	annual
Brazil	939,929 (sum living+dead)	449,762 (ARV) 798,283 (AIDS-Jun '15)	290,929 (Dec 2014)	23,789 (2014)	Jun 2015	annual
China (does not include Hong Kong SAR Macau SAR)	855,000	295,358 on ARV with 205,000 living with AIDS(dec 2014)	201,000	96,000 (9 mo)	Sep 2016	random
Zambia	at least 480,925	480,925 on ART			Dec 2012	random
Ghana	at least 438,468 (225,487 living)	72,839 cumulative ART, 66,504 taking ART (jun '12)	180,899 (until 2007), 18,082 (2008), 14,000 (2013)	12,073	Dec 2013	random
Malawi	at least 405,131	405,131 taking ART	N/A	~50,000 (2012)	Dec 2012	random
Vietnam	315,000 (228,000 living)	85,100 AIDS	87,000	1500 (3 mo)	Apr 2016	3 mo
Angola	at least 254,471 2006-Dec 2009	56,963 on ART (3-13)	1,167(2011 only)	24,239(2011)	2011	random
New York State, United States	258,530	200,019 AIDS	126,356	3,316	Dec 2012	annual?
Ukraine	277,481	81,860 AIDS	37,583	15,877	Oct 2015	monthly?
Botswana	at least 263,000	247,157 on ARV (2014), 263,000 eligible	-	N/A	Dec 2014	random?
California, United States	220,543	169,588 AIDS	98,161	N/A	Jun 2014	6mo?
Mexico	228,200	174,564 AIDS(2014)/ 89,410 on ARV (2013)	93,618 (2013)	9,573	Dec 2014	annual
Myanmar	225,000 living	120,000 ARV	N/A	11,149 (10 mo.)	Oct 2016	random
Haiti	206,821	42,673 ARV	19,560	25,161	Dec 2013	annual
Cambodia	197,000 (mid-range est 2014) (77,861 living 2012)	55,092 taking ART (2012)	122,000 (mid-range est.) 4,943 (2011-12 only)	1,329 (2012)	Dec 2012	random
Indonesia	242,699	87,453 AIDS; 63,066 taking ART currently (2015)	14,754	41,250 (2016)	Mar 2017	3mo
Namibia	at least 143,805	143,805 on ARV (Dec 2015)	-	N/A	Dec 2015	random?
United Kingdom	128,652	–	19,912 (to 2010)		Dec 2012	annual
Colombia	124,868 (since 1985)	39,397 on ARV (jan 2013)	39,887(2012)	11,414 (2015)	Dec 2013/Dec 2015	annual
Rwanda	at least 123,317	123,317 on ART	-	13,000 (2013)	Dec 2013	random
Texas, United States	124,351	–	51,419	4,265	Dec 2012	annual
Cameroon	at least 122,783	122,783 on ARV (Dec 2012)	-	N/A	Dec 2012	random?
Swaziland	at least 112,912	112,912 on ARV (Jun 2015)	-	N/A	Jun 2015	random?
Ivory Coast	at least 110,370	110,370 on ARV (Dec 2012)	-	N/A	Dec 2012	random?
Niger	at least 107,122	107,122 taking ART	N/A	–	2010	random
Malaysia	105,189	21,384 AIDS; 21,654 on ART	17,096	3,517	Dec 2014	annual

=== Over 10,000 cases ===
Country/region	Documented cases of HIV (Cumulative)	ARV/ART enrolled or documented cases of AIDS (Cumulative)	Documented deaths (Cumulative)	HIV cases past 12 mo. before reported date	Figures as of**	Updated every
Lesotho	at least 92,747	92,747 on ARV (Dec 2013)	-	N/A	Dec 2013	random?
Spain	at least 80,827	80,827 (AIDS)	51,000 (2009)	2,908	Dec 2010	annual?
Canada	78,511	(23,111 AIDS, some provinces no longer report)	14,381	2,090	Dec 2013	annual
Argentina	59,940 (2011)	34,385 on ART (6-2012), 43,249 AIDS(2011)	28,159 (2010)	4,726 (2011)	Dec 2011	annual
France	54,406	-	N/A	4,066	Dec 2012	random
Peru	53,334	31,522 AIDS	-	1,078 (4 mo)	Apr 2014	monthly
Nepal	at least 52,089 (deaths+on ARV) of which 26,702 reported	11,089 on ARV	~ 41,000	1,493	Dec 2014	annual
Philippines	46,985	4,556 AIDS, 22,413 on ART	2,303	7,364 (Jan-Aug 2017)	Aug 2017	monthly
Germany	45,987	-	N/A	2,593	Dec 2012	random
Portugal	42,350	17,373 AIDS	9,509	1551	Dec 2012	annual?
Guangdong, China	41,922	-	N/A	7,030	Oct 2013	random
Ecuador	34,964	10,432 AIDS	7,031	N/A	Dec 2012	annual?
Australia	34,029 (25,708 living 2012)	-	6,767Dec 2008	1253	Dec 2012	annual
Puerto Rico	37,537	-	N/A		Dec 2007	annual
Guatemala	34,512	-	N/A	1,898 (2014)	Dec 2014	annual?
Chile	at least 34,019 (29,092 cases 2012 end+4,927 in 2016)	7,388 ARV	N/A	4,927 (2016)	Dec 2016	random
Switzerland	33,942	9,534 AIDS	N/A	575	Dec 2013	annual?
Honduras	33,130(Oct 2015)	22,932 AIDS (Sep 2013), 17,340 ARV(Dec '15)	N/A	800(2015)	May 2014/Dec 2015	random
Taiwan	33,018(Oct 2016)	12,691(2014)	4,600(2014)	1,991 (10 mo to 10/16)	Oct 2016	monthly
Papua New Guinea	32,087	12,000 taking ARV(2012)	N/A	N/A	Dec 2009	random
El Salvador	30,487	-	N/A	1230 (10 mo)	Oct 2013	random
Iran	27,916	3168 AIDS	4419	1800	Sep 2011	random
Belgium	25,724	-	N/A	1227	Dec 2012	annual?
Papua, Indonesia	25,586	13,398 AIDS	738 (2013)	3,866	Dec 2016	3mo
Japan	24,882	7,758 AIDS	1,666	1,500 (12 mo)	May 2015	3mo
Uzbekistan	24,539	-	N/A	3267 (10 mo)	Oct 2012	random
Italy	23,132	-	N/A	3,898	Dec 2012	annual?
Netherlands	20,821	-	N/A	976	Dec 2012	annual?
Saudi Arabia	20,539 (5890 Saudis)	-	N/A	1,777	Dec 2013	annual?
Kazakhstan	19,774	-	N/A	2014	Dec 2012	random
Liberia	19,111 living	-	N/A	N/A	Jun 2013	random
Cuba	at least 18,463 (16,400 living)	-	2,063(2009)	2,156	Dec 2013	random
Pakistan	17,500+ (9,000+ in 2013 and 8,500 new)	5,000 ART (2013)	N/A	8,500 (18 mo to 6/17)	Jun 2017	random
Bolivia	17,334	-	N/A	N/A	Jun 2013/Oct 2016	random
Romania	16,697	4,629AIDS/7,352ARV(Jun'11)	5,801	-	Dec 2010	annual?
Uruguay	16,171	-	1,767 (Oct 2008)	953 (11 mo)	Nov 2012	random
Poland	16,562	-	N/A	1085	Dec 2012	annual?
Veracruz,Mexico	15,231	-	-	6,400	Dec 2013	random
Bali, Indonesia	15,237	6,824 AIDS	305 (2013)	2,367	Dec 2016	3mo
District of Columbia, United States	14,465 living	-	1,660 (2006-2010 only)	835 (477 AIDS, 2010)	Dec 2010	annual?
Belarus	13,623	-	917 (Dec 2010)	1223	Dec 2012	random
Greece	12,700	-	N/A	1059	Oct 2012	random
Panama	12,315(dec 2011)	-	67(sep 09)	627(to Sep 2009)	Sep 2009/Dec 2011	random
Paraguay	12,116	3,821 AIDS	1,318	538 (6 mo)	jun 2013	random
Nicaragua	11,994	3,646 ARV	1,358	898 (11 mo)	Nov 2016	annual?
South Korea	at least 11,685 (10,502 living 2015 end+Sep 2009 1183 dead)	-	1183 (9-2009)	1,152(2015)	Dec 2015	annual?
Bahamas	11,547	-	4,000+	263(12-08)	Apr 2009	random
Sweden	10,329	-	N/A	363	Dec 2012	annual?

=== Under 10,000 cases ===
Country/region	Documented cases of HIV (Cumulative)	ARV/ART enrolled or documented cases of AIDS (Cumulative)	Documented deaths (Cumulative)	HIV cases past 12 mo. before reported date	Figures as of**	Updated every
Costa Rica	9,179	84 ART	N/A	979	Dec 2016	annual
Turkey	9,300	-	N/A	1,700	Dec 2014	random
Hong Kong	8,952	1,829 AIDS	N/A	153(3 mo)	sep 2017	3mo
Estonia	8,377	-	N/A	315	2012 end	annual?
Moldova	7,834	-	-	487	Dec 2012	annual?
Israel	7,517	-	-	757	Dec 2012	annual?
Morocco	7,360	4,570 AIDS	N/A	N/A	Dec 2012	random
Singapore	7,140	1,379(AIDS) in 2013	1,816	455	Dec 2015	annual
Laos	6,661	3977 AIDS (6-14), 1250 on ART (2009)	1571	423 (6 mo)	Jun 2014	random
Ireland	6,528	-	339	Dec 2012	-	annual?
Denmark	6,399		96 in 2013	315	Dec 2012	annual?
Volta Region, Ghana	6,289*	-	N/A	3,309(10 mo)	Oct 2009	random
Egypt	6,228 total (2013) (4,781 total 3,746 Egyptians - Dec 2011)	1663 AIDS(Dec '11)	N/A	N/A		random?
Belize	5,976	1,358 on ARV (2011)	N/A	241	Dec 2013	annual?
Kyrgyzstan	5,642	-	1040	567 (Jan-Sep '12)	Nov 2014	random
Latvia	5,527	-	N/A	339	Dec 2012	random
Norway	5,137	-	N/A	242	Dec 2012	annual?
Tajikistan	4,585	-	N/A	814	Jun 2012	annual?
Azerbaijan	3784	-	3871 May 2011	517	Dec 2012	random
Georgia	3,667	-	N/A	493	Dec 2012	random
Bangladesh	3674	-	563	433	Nov 2014	random?
Yemen	3,071	-	-	189 (6 mo)	Jun 2010	random
Serbia	2,850	-	1071Nov 2010	125	Dec 2012	annual?
Hungary	2,845	796 AIDS	358	230	31 Dec 2014	random
Czech Republic	2,200	-	178 (Jan 2012)	99(Jan-Apr '14)	Apr 2014	annual?
Lithuania	2060 living	-	N/A	160	Dec 2012	annual?
Bulgaria	2,025	-	N/A	195 (11 mo)	Nov 2014	annual?
Oman	2,017 (to 2010) 1,454 living (2012)	-	-	-	Dec 2012	random
Netherlands Antilles	1,812	-	N/A	90	Dec 2007	random
Sri Lanka	2,309	587 AIDS	357	235	Dec 2015	quarterly
Lebanon	1,780	764 on ARV	N/A	109	Dec 2014	-
Armenia	1,520	(777 AIDS)	340	228 (2012)	Aug 2013	annual
Afghanistan	1,367	-	N/A	N/A	Dec 2011	random
Croatia	862	325AIDS,494ARV	176	-	Dec 2010	annual?
[Jordan	712	-	90	69	Dec 2009	random
United Arab Emirates	636	-	147 (10 mo)	N/A	Oct 2009	random
Macau, China	508	-	N/A	33	Dec 2012	random
Fiji	482	-	N/A	62	Dec 2012	annual
Slovakia	467	57AIDS,145ARV	37	28	Dec 2010	annual?
Bhutan	380	-	54 (Nov 2012)	34 (Dec-Jun)	Jun 2014	random
Qatar	231	-	N/A	N/A	Dec 2008	random
Timor-Leste	117	-	N/A	N/A	Apr 2009	random
Brunei	110	-	N/A	24	Dec 2015	annual
Mongolia	61	-	8	N/A	Oct 2009	random
Tonga	19	n/a	n/a	0 (since 2012)	2014	random

- (1) Note: HIV cases sums use national data, subdivision data summed for deaths when national data not available.
- (2) "Figures as of" refers to for when the data is valid, not when the data is released.
- (3) ? in 'Updated every' column denotes intervals with missing data, update irregularities
- (4) French cumulative figures only from 2004.
- (5) Brazil only began counting HIV cases from 2000, but AIDS from 1980.
- (6) Volta region of Ghana cumulative cases beginning in 2008.
- (7) China previously released older figures that were higher, and revised its numbers down with no explanation given.
