= AIDS Care =

- Discipline: HIV/AIDS
- Language: English
- Edited by: Lorraine Sherr

Publication details
- History: 1989–present
- Publisher: Taylor & Francis
- Frequency: 10/year
- Impact factor: 1.887 (2021)

Standard abbreviations
- ISO 4: AIDS Care

Indexing
- CODEN: AIDCEF
- ISSN: 0954-0121 (print); 1360-0451 (web)
- LCCN: 96640174
- OCLC no.: 629710676

Links
- Journal homepage; Online access

AIDS Care (subtitle: Psychological and Socio-medical Aspects of AIDS/HIV) is a peer-reviewed medical journal publishing HIV/AIDS research from multiple different disciplines, including psychology and sociology. It was established in 1989 and is published ten times per year by Taylor & Francis. The editor-in-chief is Lorraine Sherr (University College London). According to the Journal Citation Reports, the journal has a 2021 impact factor of 1.887.

Acquired immunodeficiency syndrome (AIDS), is an ongoing, also called chronic, condition. It's caused by the human immunodeficiency virus, also called HIV. HIVdamages the immune system so that the body is less able to fight infection and disease. If HIV isn't treated, it can take years before it weakens the immune system enough to become AIDS. Thanks to treatment, most people in the U.S. don't get AIDS. According Wikipedia HIV is mainly transmitted through sex via blood, semen, or vaginal fluids. It can also spread from mother to child during pregnancy, birth, or breastfeeding. HIV exists in fluids as free virus and in infected cells. Transmission risk is negligible if the infected partner has an undetectable viral load. Caring for AIDS involves consistent antiretroviral therapy (ART) to suppress the virus and strengthen the immune system. Regular medical check-ups monitor health and manage opportunistic infections. Proper nutrition, hygiene, and mental health support are vital. Safe practices prevent transmission to others. Support groups offer emotional and social help. Adhering to treatment improves quality of life and life expectancy. Care also includes managing coexisting conditions like tuberculosis or hepatitis. Education and counseling empower individuals to live positively and make informed health decisions.
