= Duesberg hypothesis =

Scientifically rejected hypothesis that AIDS is not caused by HIV

The Duesberg hypothesis is the claim that AIDS is not caused by HIV, but instead that AIDS is caused by noninfectious factors such as recreational and pharmaceutical drug use and that HIV is merely a harmless passenger virus. The hypothesis was popularized by Peter Duesberg, a professor of biology at University of California, Berkeley, from whom the hypothesis gets its name. The scientific consensus is that the Duesberg hypothesis is incorrect and that HIV is the cause of AIDS. The scientific community generally contends that Duesberg's arguments in favor of the hypothesis are the result of cherry-picking predominantly outdated scientific data and selectively ignoring evidence that demonstrates HIV's role in causing AIDS.

== Role of legal and illegal drug use ==
Duesberg argues that there is a statistical correlation between trends in recreational drug use and trends in AIDS cases. He argues that the epidemic of AIDS cases in the 1980s corresponds to a supposed epidemic of recreational drug use in the United States and Europe during the same time frame.

These claims are not supported by epidemiologic data. The average yearly increase in opioid-related deaths from 1990 to 2002 was nearly three times the yearly increase from 1979 to 1990, with the greatest increase in 2000–2002, yet AIDS cases and deaths fell dramatically during the mid-to-late-1990s. Duesberg's claim that recreational drug use, rather than HIV, was the cause of AIDS has been specifically examined and found to be false. Cohort studies have found that only HIV-positive drug users develop opportunistic infections; HIV-negative drug users do not develop such infections, indicating that HIV rather than drug use is the cause of AIDS.

Duesberg has also argued that nitrite inhalants were the cause of the epidemic of Kaposi sarcoma (KS) in gay men. However, this argument has been described as an example of the fallacy of a statistical confounding effect; it is now known that a herpesvirus, potentiated by HIV, is responsible for AIDS-associated KS.

Moreover, in addition to recreational drugs, Duesberg argues that anti-HIV drugs such as zidovudine (AZT) can cause AIDS. Duesberg's claim that antiviral medication causes AIDS is regarded as disproven within the scientific community. Placebo-controlled studies have found that AZT as a single agent produces modest and short-lived improvements in survival and delays the development of opportunistic infections; it certainly did not cause AIDS, which develops in both treated and untreated study patients. With the subsequent development of protease inhibitors and highly active antiretroviral therapy, numerous studies have documented the fact that anti-HIV drugs prevent the development of AIDS and substantially prolong survival, further disproving the claim that these drugs "cause" AIDS.

=== Scientific study and rejection of Duesberg's risk-AIDS hypothesis ===
Several studies have specifically addressed Duesberg's claim that recreational drug abuse or sexual promiscuity were responsible for the manifestations of AIDS. An early study of his claims, published in Nature in 1993, found Duesberg's drug abuse-AIDS hypothesis to have "no basis in fact."

A large prospective study followed a group of 715 homosexual men in the Vancouver, Canada, area; approximately half were HIV-seropositive or became so during the follow-up period, and the remainder were HIV-seronegative. After more than eight years of follow-up, despite similar rates of drug use, sexual contact, and other supposed risk factors in both groups, only the HIV-positive group suffered from opportunistic infections. Similarly, CD4 counts dropped in the patients who were HIV-infected, but remained stable in the HIV-negative patients, despite similar rates of risk behavior. The authors concluded that "the risk-AIDS hypothesis ... is clearly rejected by our data," and that "the evidence supports the hypothesis that HIV-1 has an integral role in the CD4 depletion and progressive immune dysfunction that characterise AIDS."

Similarly, the Multicenter AIDS Cohort Study (MACS) and the Women's Interagency HIV Study (WIHS)—which between them observed more than 8,000 Americans—demonstrated that "the presence of HIV infection is the only factor that is strongly and consistently associated with the conditions that define AIDS." A 2008 study found that recreational drug use (including cannabis, cocaine, poppers, and amphetamines) had no effect on CD4 or CD8 T-cell counts, providing further evidence against a role of recreational drugs as a cause of AIDS.

== Current AIDS definitions ==
Duesberg argued in 1989 that a significant number of AIDS victims had died without proof of HIV infection. However, with the use of modern culture techniques and polymerase chain reaction testing, HIV can be demonstrated in virtually all patients with AIDS. Since AIDS is now defined partially by the presence of HIV, Duesberg claims it is impossible by definition to offer evidence that AIDS does not require HIV. However, the first definitions of AIDS mentioned no cause and the first AIDS diagnoses were made before HIV was discovered. The addition of HIV positivity to surveillance criteria as an absolutely necessary condition for case reporting occurred only in 1993, after a scientific consensus was established that HIV caused AIDS.

== AIDS in Africa ==
According to the Duesberg hypothesis, AIDS is not found in Africa. What Duesberg calls "the myth of an African AIDS epidemic," among people" exists for several reasons, including:

- The need, according to Duesberg, of the CDC, the WHO, and other health organizations to justify their existences, resulting in their "manufacturing contagious plagues out of noninfectious medical conditions."
- Media sensationalism, with stories that "helped shape the Western impression of an AIDS problem out of control," resulting in high levels of funding.
- Willing participation in deception by local doctors who wish to take advantage of this aid money: "African doctors themselves participate in building the myth of the AIDS pandemic."
- Confusion or incompetence on the part of African doctors: "Many common Third World diseases are confused with AIDS even if they are not part of its official definition."

Duesberg states that African AIDS cases are "a collection of long-established, indigenous diseases, such as chronic fevers, weight loss, alias "slim disease," diarrhea, and tuberculosis" that result from malnutrition and poor sanitation. African AIDS cases, though, have increased in the last three decades as HIV's prevalence has increased but as malnutrition percentages and poor sanitation have declined in many African regions. In addition, while HIV and AIDS are more prevalent in urban than in rural settings in Africa, malnutrition and poor sanitation are found more commonly in rural than in urban settings.

According to Duesberg, common diseases are easily misdiagnosed as AIDS in Africa because "the diagnosis of African AIDS is arbitrary" and does not include HIV testing. A definition of AIDS agreed upon in 1985 by the World Health Organization in Bangui did not require a positive HIV test, but since 1985, many African countries have added positive HIV tests to the Bangui criteria for AIDS or changed their definitions to match those of the U.S. Centers for Disease Control. One of the reasons for using more HIV tests despite their expense is that, rather than overestimating AIDS as Duesberg suggests, the Bangui definition alone excluded nearly half of African AIDS patients."

Duesberg notes that diseases associated with AIDS differ between African and Western populations, concluding that the causes of immunodeficiency must be different. Tuberculosis is much more commonly diagnosed among AIDS patients in Africa than in Western countries, while PCP conforms to the opposite pattern. Tuberculosis, though, had higher prevalence in Africa than in the West before the spread of HIV. In Africa and the United States, HIV has spurred a similar percentage increase in tuberculosis cases. PCP may be underestimated in Africa: since machinery "required for accurate testing is relatively rare in many resource-poor areas, including large parts of Africa, PCP is likely to be underdiagnosed in Africa. Consistent with this hypothesis, studies that report the highest rates of PCP in Africa are those that use the most advanced diagnostic methods" Duesberg also claims that Kaposi's sarcoma is "exclusively diagnosed in male homosexual risk groups using nitrite inhalants and other psychoactive drugs as aphrodisiacs", but the cancer is fairly common among heterosexuals in some parts of Africa, and is found in heterosexuals in the United States as well.

Because reported AIDS cases in Africa and other parts of the developing world include a larger proportion of people who do not belong to Duesberg's preferred risk groups of drug addicts and male homosexuals, Duesberg writes on his website that "There are no risk groups in Africa, like drug addicts and homosexuals." However, many studies have addressed the issue of risk groups in Africa and concluded that the risk of AIDS is not equally distributed. In addition, AIDS in Africa largely kills sexually active working-age adults.

South African president Thabo Mbeki accepted Duesberg's hypothesis and, through the mid-2000s, rejected offers of medical assistance to fight HIV infection, a policy of inaction that cost over 300,000 lives.

== Duesberg claims that retroviruses like HIV must be harmless to survive ==
Duesberg argues that retroviruses like HIV must be harmless to survive: they do not kill cells and they do not cause cancer, he maintains. Duesberg writes, "retroviruses do not kill cells because they depend on viable cells for the replication of their RNA from viral DNA integrated into cellular DNA." Duesberg elsewhere states that "the typical virus reproduces by entering a living cell and commandeering the cell's resources in order to make new virus particles, a process that ends with the disintegration of the dead cell."

Duesberg also rejects the involvement of retroviruses and other viruses in cancer. To him, virus-associated cancers are "freak accidents of nature" that do not warrant research programs such as the war on cancer. Duesberg rejects a role in cancer for numerous viruses, including leukemia viruses, Epstein–Barr virus, human papilloma virus, hepatitis B, feline leukemia virus, and human T-lymphotropic virus.

Duesberg claims that the supposedly innocuous nature of all retroviruses is supported by what he considers to be their normal mode of proliferation: infection from mother to child in utero. Duesberg does not suggest that HIV is an endogenous retrovirus, a virus integrated into the germline and genetically heritable:

...[a mother] provides her child with a nine-month continuous exposure to her blood and therefore has at least a 50 percent chance of passing HIV to the baby.

== Scientific response to the Duesberg hypothesis ==
The consensus in the scientific community is that the Duesberg hypothesis has been refuted by a large and growing mass of evidence showing that HIV causes AIDS, that the amount of virus in the blood correlates with disease progression, that a plausible mechanism for HIV's action has been proposed, and that anti-HIV medication decreases mortality and opportunistic infection in people with AIDS.

In the 9 December 1994 issue of Science (Vol. 266, No. 5191), Duesberg's methods and claims were evaluated in a group of articles. The authors concluded that

- It is abundantly evident that HIV causes disease and death in hemophiliacs, a group generally lacking Duesberg's proposed risk factors.
- HIV fulfills Koch's postulates, which are one set of criteria for demonstrating a causal relationship between a microbe and a disease. (Subsequently, additional data further demonstrated the fulfillment of Koch's postulates.)
- the AIDS epidemic in Thailand cited by Duesberg as confirmation of his hypothesis is in fact evidence of the role of HIV in AIDS.
- According to researchers who conducted large-scale studies of AZT, the drug does not cause AIDS. Furthermore, researchers acknowledged that recreational drugs do cause immune abnormalities, though not the type of immunodeficiency seen in AIDS.

=== Effectiveness of antiretroviral medication ===
The vast majority of people with AIDS have never received antiretroviral drugs, including those in developed countries prior to the licensure of AZT (zidovudine) in 1987, and people in developing countries today where very few individuals have access to these medications.

The NIAID reports that

in the mid-1980s, clinical trials enrolling patients with AIDS found that AZT given as single-drug therapy conferred a modest survival advantage compared [with] placebo. Among HIV-infected patients who had not yet developed AIDS, placebo-controlled trials found that AZT given as single-drug therapy delayed, for a year or two, the onset of AIDS-related illnesses. Significantly, long-term follow-up of these trials did not show a prolonged benefit of AZT, but also did not indicate that the drug increased disease progression or mortality. The lack of excess AIDS cases and death in the AZT arms of these placebo-controlled trials in effect counters the argument that AZT causes AIDS. Subsequent clinical trials found that patients receiving two-drug combinations had up to 50 percent improvements in time to progression to AIDS and in survival when compared with people receiving single-drug therapy. In more recent years, three-drug combination therapies have produced another 50 to 80 percent improvement in progression to AIDS and in survival when compared with two-drug regimens in clinical trials.

Use of potent anti-HIV combination therapies has contributed to dramatic reductions in the incidence of AIDS and AIDS-related deaths in populations where these drugs are widely available, an effect which clearly would not be seen if antiretroviral drugs caused AIDS.

=== Opponents claim that nearly all HIV-positive people will develop AIDS ===
Duesberg claims as support for his idea that many drug-free HIV-positive people have not yet developed AIDS; HIV/AIDS scientists note that many drug-free HIV-positive people have developed AIDS, and that, in the absence of medical treatment or rare genetic factors postulated to delay disease progression, it is very likely that nearly all HIV-positive people will eventually develop AIDS. Scientists also note that HIV-negative drug users do not suffer from immune system collapse.

== See also ==
- HIV/AIDS denialism
- Inventing the AIDS Virus
