= Peter Duesberg =

German-American molecular biologist (1936–2026)

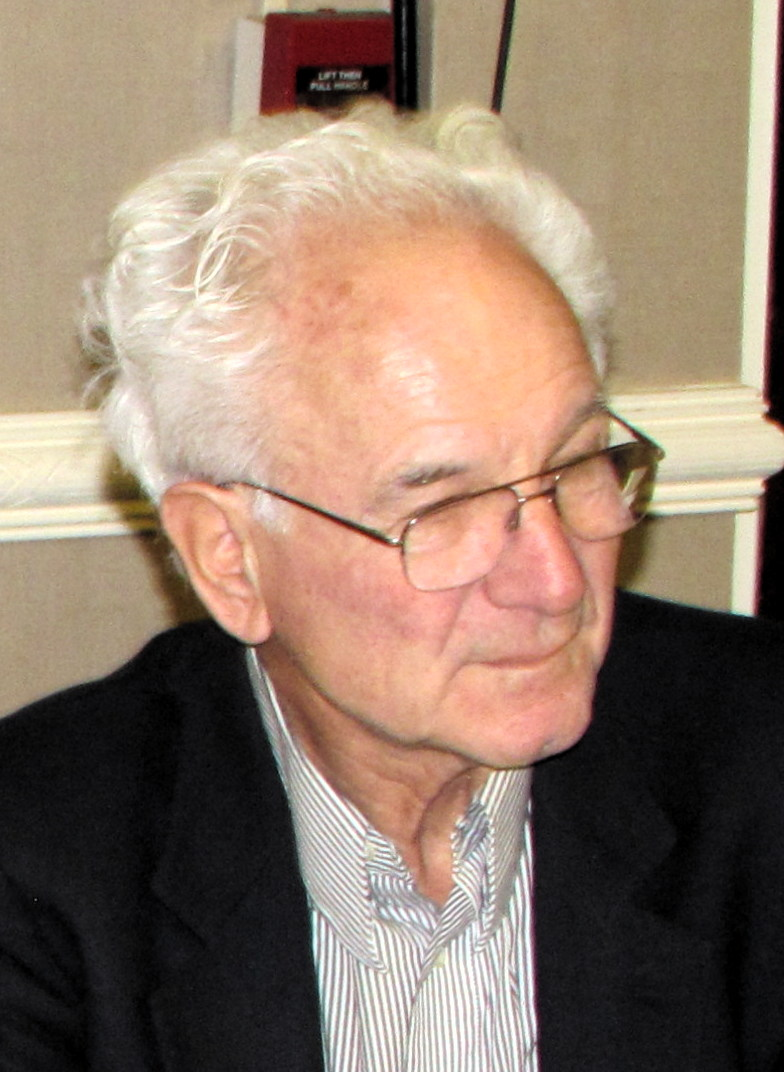
- Duesberg in 2017
- Born: 2 December 1936; Münster, Gau Westphalia-North, Germany
- Died: 13 January 2026 (aged 89); Lafayette, California, US
- Education: University of Frankfurt (PhD)
- Known for: Oncogene research AIDS denialism
- Scientific career
- Fields: Molecular biology
- Workplaces: University of California, Berkeley
- Thesis: Fraktionierungen von Proteinen – besonders Enzymen – mit Ionenaustauschern und Molekularsieben <vom Typ Sephadex> (1963)

Peter Heinz Hermann Duesberg (2 December 1936 – 13 January 2026) was a German-American molecular biologist and a professor of molecular and cell biology at the University of California, Berkeley. He is known for his early research into the genetic aspects of cancer. He was a proponent of AIDS denialism, the claim that HIV does not cause AIDS.

Duesberg received acclaim early in his career for research on oncogenes and cancer. With Peter K. Vogt, he reported in 1970 that a cancer-causing virus of birds had extra genetic material compared with non-cancer-causing viruses, hypothesizing that this material contributed to cancer.

== Biography ==
=== Early life and education ===
Duesberg grew up during World War II, raised as a Catholic in Germany. He moved to the US in 1964 to work at the University of California, Berkeley, following completion of a Ph.D. in chemistry at the University of Frankfurt.

=== Career ===
At the age of 36, Duesberg was awarded tenure at the University of California, Berkeley, and at 49, he was elected to the National Academy of Sciences. He received an Outstanding Investigator Grant from the National Institutes of Health in 1986, and from 1986 to 1987 was a Fogarty scholar-in-residence at the NIH laboratories in Bethesda, Maryland.

Long considered a contrarian by his scientific colleagues, Duesberg began to gain public notoriety with a March 1987 article in Cancer Research entitled "Retroviruses as Carcinogens and Pathogens: Expectations and Reality". In this and subsequent writings, Duesberg proposed his hypothesis that AIDS is caused by long-term consumption of recreational drugs or antiretroviral drugs, and that the retrovirus known as 'HIV' is a harmless passenger virus. In contrast, the scientific consensus is that HIV infection causes AIDS; Duesberg's HIV/AIDS claims have been addressed and rejected as erroneous by the scientific community. Reviews of his opinions in Nature and Science asserted that they were unpersuasive and based on selective reading of the literature, and that although Duesberg had a right to a dissenting opinion, his failure to fairly review evidence that HIV causes AIDS meant that his opinion lacked credibility.

Duesberg's views are cited as major influences on South African HIV/AIDS policy under the administration of Thabo Mbeki, which embraced AIDS denialism. Duesberg served on an advisory panel to Mbeki convened in 2000. The Mbeki administration's failure to provide antiretroviral drugs in a timely manner, due in part to the influence of AIDS denialism, is thought to be responsible for hundreds of thousands of preventable AIDS deaths and HIV infections in South Africa. Duesberg disputed these findings in an article in the journal Medical Hypotheses, but the journal's publisher, Elsevier, later retracted Duesberg's article over accuracy and ethics concerns as well as its rejection during peer review. The incident prompted several complaints to Duesberg's institution, the University of California, Berkeley, which began a misconduct investigation of Duesberg in 2009. The investigation was dropped in 2010, with university officials finding "insufficient evidence ... to support a recommendation for disciplinary action."

In 2021, Duesberg had a stroke that left him with severe aphasia affecting speaking, reading, and writing, according to a woman who described him as her husband in an email to the host of a Radio‑Canada podcast.

== His work with diseases ==
=== Cancer ===
In the 1970s, Duesberg won international acclaim for his groundbreaking work on cancer. Duesberg's early work on cancer included being the first to identify the oncogene v-src from the genome of Rous sarcoma virus, a chicken virus believed to trigger tumor growth. Duesberg disputes the importance of oncogenes and retroviruses in cancer. He supports the aneuploidy hypothesis of cancer that was first proposed in 1914 by Theodor Heinrich Boveri.

Despite having discovered an oncogene, Duesberg rejects the importance of mutations, oncogenes, and anti-oncogenes entirely. In 1998, Duesberg co-authored a paper reporting a correlation between chromosome number and the genetic instability of cancer cells, which they dubbed "the ploidy factor," confirming earlier research by other groups that demonstrated an association between degree of aneuploidy and metastasis.

Although unwilling to concur with Duesberg in throwing out a role for cancer genes, many researchers support exploration of alternative hypotheses. In 2007, Scientific American published an article by Duesberg on his aneuploidy cancer theory. In an editorial explaining their decision to publish this article, the editors of Scientific American wrote: "Thus, as wrong as Duesberg surely is about HIV, there is at least a chance that he is significantly right about cancer."

A consequence of Duesberg's aneuploidy theory of cancer is his opposition to the HPV vaccine (against the virus that causes genital warts), as the idea that a virus could cause most cases of cervical cancer is inconsistent with his claims about what causes cancer. Although Duesberg generally favors vaccination, he vehemently opposed the rollout of the HPV vaccine, saying the vaccine was "all risk and no benefit".

=== AIDS ===
In his 1996 book, Inventing the AIDS Virus, published by Regnery Publishing, a politically conservative book publisher based in Washington, D.C., and in numerous journal articles and letters to the editor, Duesberg asserts that HIV is harmless and that recreational and pharmaceutical drug use, especially of zidovudine (AZT, a drug used in the treatment of AIDS) are the causes of AIDS outside Africa (the so-called Duesberg hypothesis). He considers AIDS diseases as markers for drug use, e.g., use of poppers (alkyl nitrites) among some homosexuals, asserting a correlation between AIDS and recreational drug use. This correlation hypothesis has been disproven by evidence showing that only HIV infection, not homosexuality or recreational/pharmaceutical drug use, predicts who will develop AIDS.

Duesberg asserts that AIDS in Africa is misdiagnosed and the epidemic a "myth", claiming incorrectly that the diagnostic criteria for AIDS are different in Africa than elsewhere, and that the breakdown of the immune system in African AIDS patients can be explained exclusively by factors such as malnutrition, tainted drinking water, and various infections that he presumes are common to AIDS patients in Africa. Duesberg also argues that retroviruses like HIV must be harmless to survive, and that the normal mode of retroviral propagation is mother-to-child transmission by infection in utero.

Since Duesberg published his first paper on the subject in 1987, scientists have examined and criticized the accuracy of his hypotheses on AIDS causation. Duesberg entered a long dispute with John Maddox, then-editor of the scientific journal Nature, demanding the right to rebut articles that HIV caused AIDS. For several years Maddox consented to this demand but ultimately refused to continue to publish Duesberg's criticisms:

[Duesberg] forfeited the right to expect answers by his rhetorical technique. Questions left unanswered for more than about ten minutes he takes as further proof that HIV is not the cause of AIDS. Evidence that contradicts his alternative drug hypothesis is on the other hand brushed aside...Duesberg will not be alone in protesting that this is merely a recipe for suppressing challenges to received wisdom. So it can be. But Nature will not so use it. Instead, what Duesberg continues to say about the causation of AIDS will be reported in the general interest. When he offers a text for publication that can be authenticated, it will if possible be published.

— Maddox, 1993

A number of scientific criticisms of Duesberg's hypothesis were summarized in a review article in the journal Science in 1994, which presented the results of a three-month scientific investigation into some of Duesberg's claims. In the Science article, science writer Jon Cohen interviewed both HIV researchers and AIDS denialists (including Duesberg himself) and examined the AIDS literature in addition to review articles written by Duesberg. The article said:

...although the Berkeley virologist raises provocative questions, few researchers find his basic contention that HIV is not the cause of AIDS persuasive. Mainstream AIDS researchers argue that Duesberg's arguments are constructed by a selective reading of the scientific literature, dismissing evidence that contradicts his theses, requiring impossibly definitive proof, and dismissing outright studies marked by inconsequential weaknesses.

— Jon Cohen.

The article also said that Duesberg and the AIDS denialist movement have garnered support from some prominent scientists, including Nobel Prize winner Kary Mullis, while others are cited as "equally, if not more, concerned about the treatment Duesberg has received at the hands of the establishment", rather than support of his specific claim that HIV does not cause AIDS. Duesberg has been described as "the individual who has done the most damage" regarding denialism, due to the apparent scientific legitimacy his scientific credentials give to his statements.

In a 2010 article on conspiracy theories in science, Ted Goertzel highlights Duesberg's opposition to the HIV/AIDS connection as an example in which scientific findings are disputed on irrational grounds, relying on rhetoric, appeal to fairness and the right to a dissenting opinion rather than on evidence. Goertzel said that Duesberg, along with many other denialists frequently invoke the meme of a "courageous independent scientist resisting orthodoxy", invoking the name of persecuted physicist and astronomer Galileo Galilei. Regarding this comparison, Goertzel wrote:

...being a dissenter from orthodoxy is not difficult; the hard part is actually having a better theory. Publishing dissenting theories is important when they are backed by plausible evidence, but this does not mean giving critics 'equal time' to dissent from every finding by a mainstream scientist.

— Goertzel, 2010

Duesberg's advocacy of AIDS denialism has, by all accounts, effectively made him a pariah to the worldwide scientific community.

== Consequences of AIDS denialism ==
In 2000, Duesberg was the most prominent AIDS denialist to sit on a 44-member Presidential Advisory Panel on HIV and AIDS convened by then-president Thabo Mbeki of South Africa. The panel was scheduled to meet concurrently with the 2000 International AIDS Conference in Durban and to convey the impression that Mbeki's doubts about HIV/AIDS science were valid and actively discussed in the scientific community.

The views of the denialists on the panel, aired during the AIDS conference, received renewed attention. Mbeki later suffered substantial political fallout for his support for AIDS denialism and for opposing the treatment of pregnant HIV-positive South African women with antiretroviral medication. Mbeki partly attenuated his ties with denialists in 2002, asking them to stop associating their names with his.

In response to the inclusion of AIDS denialists on Mbeki's panel, the Durban Declaration was drafted and signed by over 5,000 scientists and physicians, describing the evidence that HIV causes AIDS as "clear-cut, exhaustive and unambiguous".

Two independent studies have concluded that the public health policies of Thabo Mbeki's government, shaped in part by Duesberg's writings and advice, were responsible for over 330,000 excess AIDS deaths and many preventable infections, including those of infants.

A 2008 feature story on Duesberg in Discover addresses Duesberg's role in anti-HIV drug-preventable deaths in South Africa. Jeanne Lenzer interviews prominent HIV/AIDS expert Max Essex, who suggests that,

...history will judge Duesberg as either "a nut who is just a tease to the scientific community" or an "enabler to mass murder" for the deaths of many AIDS patients in Africa.

== Academic misconduct investigation ==
In 2009, Duesberg and co-authors including David Rasnick published an article in Medical Hypotheses, an unconventionally peer reviewed journal. The article, HIV-AIDS hypothesis out of touch with South African AIDS – A new perspective, had been rejected previously by the journal JAIDS, and a peer reviewer had warned that the authors could face scientific misconduct charges if the paper were published.

The reviewers claimed that Duesberg and his co-authors cherry-picked data, cited favorable results while ignoring unfavorable results, and quoted statements out of context. The article was not revised in response to these criticisms. Moreover, the reviewers claim that Duesberg, though he included in the article that neither he nor his co-authors had financial conflicts of interest, "[committed] a serious breach of professional ethics" by failing to state a possible conflict of interest: That co-author Rasnick previously worked for Matthias Rath, a vitamin entrepreneur who sold vitamin pills as AIDS remedies.

In the article, Duesberg questioned research reporting that drug policies implemented by the South African government on the advice of Duesberg, Rasnick and others had led to excess AIDS deaths. Observing that the overall population of South Africa has increased, Duesberg claimed that HIV must be a harmless "passenger virus" that has not caused deaths in South Africa or elsewhere. Duesberg said that HIV does not replicate in the body and that antiviral drugs, which he calls "inevitably toxic," do not inhibit HIV.

Scientists expressed concerns to Elsevier, the publisher of Medical Hypotheses, about unsupported assertions and incorrect statements by Duesberg. After an internal review and with a unanimous recommendation of rejection by five Lancet reviewers, Elsevier said that the article was flawed and of potential danger to global public health. Elsevier permanently withdrew the Duesberg article and another AIDS denialist publication and asked that the editor of the journal implement a conventional peer review process.

Letters of complaint to the University of California, Berkeley, including one from Nathan Geffen of the South African Treatment Action Campaign (TAC), prompted university officials to open an inquiry into possible academic misconduct related to false statements and failure to disclose potential conflicts of interest. The investigation was dropped in 2010, with university officials finding "insufficient evidence...to support a recommendation for disciplinary action." The investigation did not evaluate the merits of the research but found that publishing the article was protected by the principle of academic freedom.

== Death ==
Duesberg died in Lafayette, California, from kidney failure on 13 January 2026, at the age of 89. He also had stroke-induced aphasia for the last five years of his life.
