= British Society of Periodontology =

Society of dental care professionals in the UK

The British Society of Periodontology is a society of periodontologists (i.e. Dental Care Professionals who specialize in treating gum diseases) in the United Kingdom. It was founded in 1949 and its aim is to "promote the art and science of periodontology". Its activities include advisory publications for professionals and the public, educational workshops, society meetings and awards for research.

== See also ==
- American Board of Periodontology
- American Academy of Periodontology Foundation
- European Federation of Periodontology
