= American Society of Dental Surgeons =

- Successor: American Dental Association
- Established: 1840
- Founder: Solyman Brown B.A., M.A., M.D., D.D.S.
- Dissolved: 1856
- Type: Professional organization
- Purpose: Dental standards and education
- Headquarters: United States
- Key people: Chapin A. Harris (President in 1856–57)

The American Society of Dental Surgeons (ASDS) was the first national dental organization formed in the United States of America. The formation of the ASDS was preceded by the formation of the Society of Dental Surgeons of the City and State of New York when fifteen dentists came together in New York City on December 3, 1834. Six years later, at a meeting at the home of Solyman Brown B.A., M.A., M.D., D.D.S. at 17 Park Place in New York City, on August 10, 1840, Chapin A. Harris in a motion that "resolved that a National Society be formed." was instrumental in its creation.

The ASDS remained the only national dental organization from 1840 to 1856, when controversy over the use of dental amalgam led to its demise. It was soon replaced by the American Dental Convention (ADC). Chapin A. Harris was also one of the foremost organizers, serving as its president in 1856–57. In 1859, a year before his death, another national dental organization, the American Dental Association, was established during a meeting in Niagara, New York. Before 1861 dentists were participant in both the ADC and the ADA, which promoted education and research in all aspects of dentistry, including dental materials and remained active throughout the American Civil War (1861–1865). However, during the war, Southern dentists withdrew from the ADC and the ADA and, in 1869, established the Southern Dental Association. The Southern Dental Association subsequently merged with the ADA in 1897 to form the National Dental Association (NDA). The NDA was renamed the American Dental Association (ADA) in 1922.

== Historical background ==
In the first third of the 19th century, American dentistry was in turmoil. No legal standards or requirements as to the type of training necessary for practitioners existed to protect patients. Even if one had no formal training, let alone any schooling, they could treat patients who had dental and oral diseases."At that time there were only about three hundred trained and scientific dentists in the entire country; the rest were relatively untrained operators, outright quacks, or charlatans". "The public was at their mercy" . In 1833 two natives of England, Edward Crawcour and his nephew Moses Crawcour (incorrectly referred to as "the Crawcour brothers"), brought amalgam to the United States, and in 1844 it was reported that fifty percent of all dental restorations placed in upstate New York consisted of amalgam.[8] However, at that point the use of dental amalgam was declared to be malpractice, and the American Society of Dental Surgeons (ASDS), the only US dental association at the time, forced all of its members to sign a pledge to abstain from using the mercury fillings.[9] This was the beginning of what is known as the first dental amalgam war.[10] The dispute ended in 1856 with the disbanding of the old association. The American Dental Association (ADA) was founded in its place in 1859, which has since then strongly defended dental amalgam from allegations of being too risky from the health standpoint.[11] The ratio of the mercury to the remaining metallic mixture in dental amalgam has not always been 50:50. It was as high as 66:33 in 1930. Relative ratios between the other metals used in dental amalgams has also been highly variable. Conventional (or gamma2)-amalgams have 32% silver and 14% tin, and they are most susceptible to corrosion due to their low copper content. Non-gamma2 dental amalgams have been developed that were, however, found to release higher levels of mercury vapor compared with traditional amalgams. Amalgam is the dental material that has the strongest tendency to create galvanic currents and high electric potentials as it ages. The rate of mercury release with the corrosion is accelerated when the amalgam filling is in contact with old restorations or coupled with gold artifacts present in the mouth.

Before 1840 there was not a single school of dentistry anywhere in the world and teaching to practitioners of the trade was based on the preceptoral—or apprenticeship—method. There was no standardized curriculum and what was taught was left to the discretion of the preceptor. Nevertheless, there were several ethical, visionary professionals who had received formal medical training as well as dental training, these professionals undertook to right the situation. Among these, following in the footsteps of Pierre Fauchard the "father of modem dentistry", were some of the profession's immortals, including Chapin A. Harris, Horace H. Hayden, Solyman Brown, and Eleazar Parmly.

These professionals would also, following the establishment of the ASDS, be instrumental in opening the first dental school in the world, the Baltimore College of Dental Surgery. The University of Maryland School of Dentistry is the dental school of the University System of Maryland. It was founded as an independent institution, the Baltimore College of Dental Surgery, in 1840 and was the birthplace of the Doctor of Dental Surgery (D.D.S.) degree. It is known as the first dental college in the world.[1][2] It is headquartered at the University of Maryland, Baltimore campus. It is the only dental school in Maryland.

== See also ==
- Amalgam (dentistry)
- Dentistry
