= Baxley (surname) =

Baxley is a surname. Notable people with the surname include:

- Barbara Baxley (1923–1990), American actress and singer
- Bill Baxley (born 1941), politician
- Henry Willis Baxley (1803–1876), American physician
  - Isaac Rieman Baxley (1850–1920), American poet and playwright and son of Henry Willis
- Jack Baxley (1884–1950), American character actor
- Lucy Baxley (1937–2016), politician
- Rob Baxley (born 1969), American football player
