= Eleazer Parmly =

American dentist

- portrait by Henry Inman
- Born: 1797
- Died: 13 December 1874 (aged 76–77)
- Occupation: Dentist

Eleazar Parmly (March 13, 1797 – December 13, 1874) was an American dentist in New York City during the 19th century. He was the first provost of The University of Maryland School of Dentistry, the first dental school established in the United States. He was the third of five brothers and his three brothers also pursued careers in dentistry.

== Education and career ==
Parmly was born in 1797, in Braintree, Vermont. At the age of 23, Parmly moved to London to work as a dentist. In 1823, he moved back to the United States to practice in New York City, where he opened a dental shop on Bond Street.

He was responsible for the development of American dentistry from a primitive craft to a respected profession with various national societies and journals. He also furthered the development of dental colleges. In addition to being a well-trained practitioner and educator, Parmly was a gifted poet and set down his autobiography in verse. He worked with several other famous dentists of the time, such as Solyman Brown, Norman William Kingsley, and Chapin A. Harris.

== Death ==
Parmly died of pneumonia on December 13, 1874, in New York City, at the age of 77.
