= Florence Kenyon Hayden Rector =

American architect

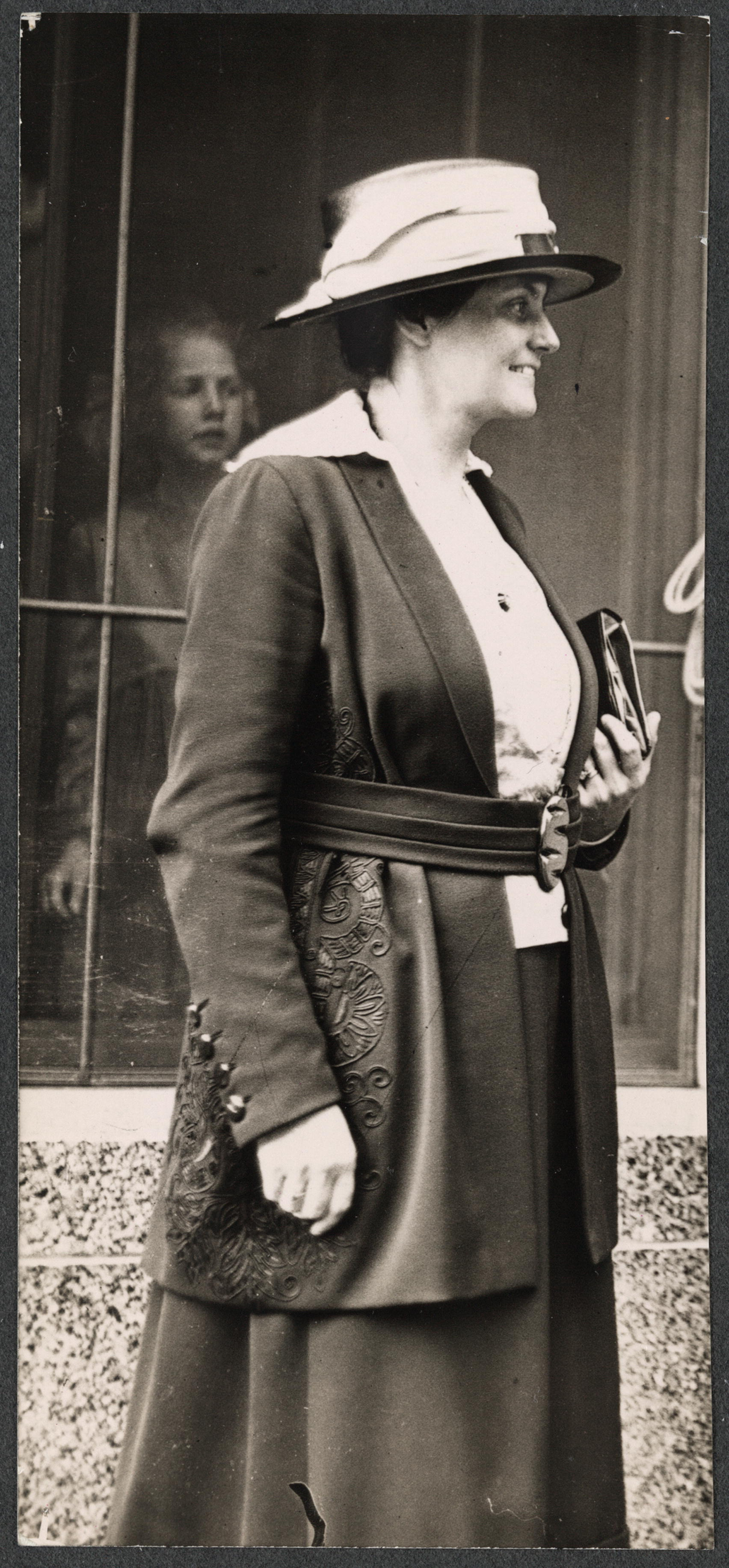
- Born: August 22, 1881; St. Louis, Missouri
- Died: May 19, 1973 (aged 91); Columbus, Ohio
- Occupation: Architect
- Buildings: Oxley Hall

Florence Kenyon Hayden Rector (August 22, 1881 – May 19, 1973) is known as the first licensed female architect in the state of Ohio, entering Ohio State University in 1901. She was also the only female architect practicing in central Ohio between 1900 and 1930. She was also active in the women's suffrage movement.

== Early life and education ==
Florence Kenyon Hayden was born on August 22, 1881 in St. Louis, Missouri to Kate Bemis Hayden and Horace Hayden. When Florence was one years old her father died and she moved with her mother and sister to Columbus, Ohio. The family lived in a Queen Anne-style house at 870 Franklin Ave, graduating from East High School.

In 1901, Rector enrolled in Ohio State University's School of Architecture, shortly leaving in 1903. While she was at the university, she studied under university architect Joseph Bradford. Even without her degree Rector was employed teaching architecture at Ohio State from 1905 to 1907.

== Career ==
After leaving the Ohio State University, Rector began her architecture firm under the name Kenyon Hayden and later after marriage Kenyon Hayden Rector, rarely using her first name professionally.

As an architect, Rector did not think good architecture was expensive, rather it was marked by "sincerity and truth, character frankness and decisiveness, simplicity and thoughtfulness" in its craftsmanship. Her residences were known to be well-integrated with a site where she would also design the surrounding gardens.

=== Oxley Hall ===
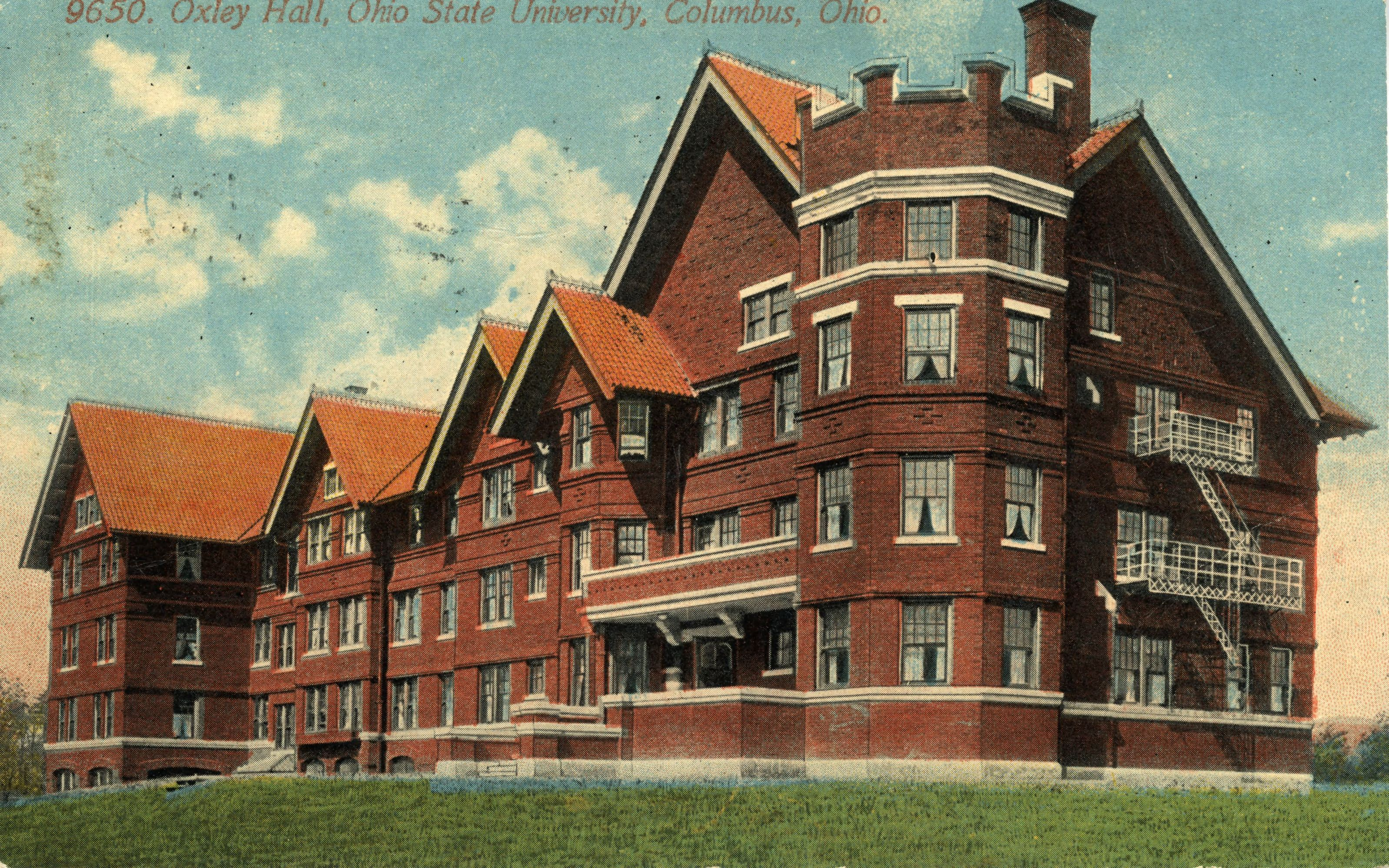
Oxley Hall at The Ohio State University

Her first major commission was of Oxley Hall, the first women's dormitory on the campus, and it was completed in 1908. Architect Joseph Bradford, whom she had studied under at OSU, recommended her work to the Board of Trustees. Despite having the experience, the Board insisted Rector work with male architect Wilbur T. Mills, most notable for his work on the Columbus Main Library. However, the relationship went sour and Rector did most of the work on the project, and is generally acknowledged as the principal architect.

The three-story building is constructed of brick and features an octagonal tower. It was built in the English Renaissance style with a Spanish tile roof, brick exterior and limestone trim. The cost of the original structure is listed as $66,490.85. The dormatory housed 60 women, barely putting a dent in the greater need for women housing.

Residents moved into the building in September 1908 and took a vote on what to name their new home. The board of trustees accepted their recommendation, and on November 20, 1908, officially named the building for university president William Oxley Thompson's mother (her maiden name, which is where he got his middle name).

The building served as a dormitory until 1967, when it was decided that it was unsuitable as a residence hall and was leased to the University Research Foundation. The building was remodeled in 1989, and in 1991 the Department of International Affairs moved in, where it remains to this day.

=== Other designs ===
After marrying in 1910, she began designing medical facilities, for which she later gained some national attention. Early in her career, Rector assisted her uncle, L. Howard Hayden, in designing the seating plan for Madison Square Garden in New York City.

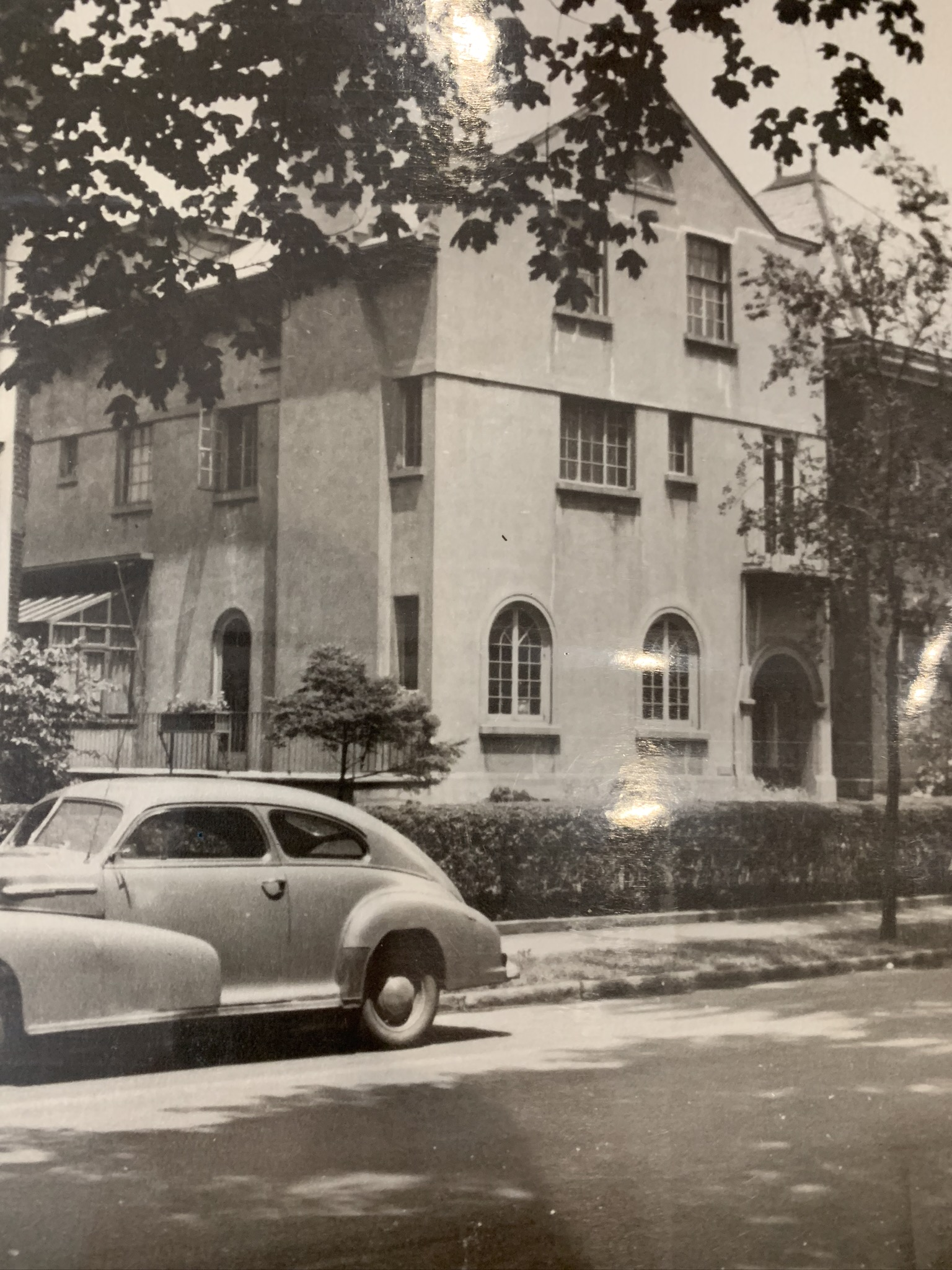
Historic photo of the home of Florence Kenyon Hayden Rector at 878 Franklin Avenue, in Columbus, Ohio. Rector designed and occupied the home from 1926 until her death.

Another design of Rector's is an arts and crafts style house that was built at 1277 East Broad Street in Columbus, where writer, editor, and revolutionary Ellis O. Jones later lived. She also designed her personal residence constructed in 1926 at 878 Franklin Avenue in Columbus, where she lived until her death. The long, narrow home she designed for herself is a stuccoed two-and-a-half story structure. With its gable end to the street, the house is modest and has an asymmetrical front facade. It combines French doors, small rectangular windows, round-headed windows, and steel casements in an eclectic and very personal design.

She was the architect for Robert Wolfe's Journal Island Cottage; a doctor's office building at State & Sixth Street (since demolished) in Columbus and residential homes.

== Suffragist and activist activities ==
Rector also maintained an active political life as well, serving as an active suffragist and as the Financial Chairwoman of the National Woman's Party in 1921. In this position, she championed prison reform, public housing and children’s issues. Her activism didn't end with the passage of the 19th amendment, and she continued working to achieve fair working conditions and economic equality for women.

Rector was on the board of visitors for the Franklin County Children's Home where she advocated for improving conditions through night supervision, to-code fire protection, and no ventilation or sanitation in the nursery. She was later pressured to resign from the position but because the board agreed with her, the superintendent and trustees resigned instead.

Rector was a founding member of the Columbus branch of Altrusa International. She was also the first woman commissioner of Franklin Park.

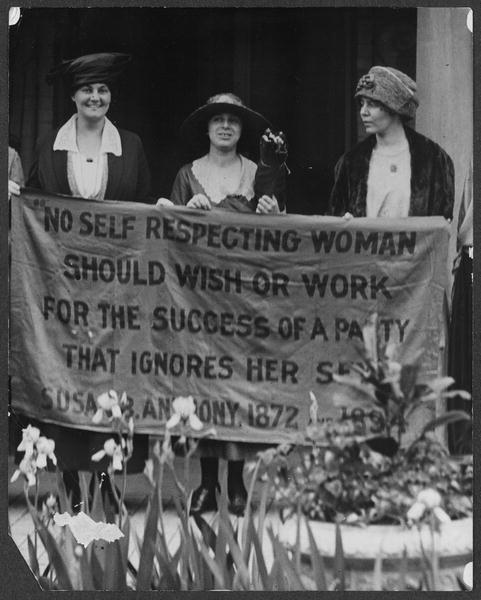
Photograph of (L-R) Kenyon Rector, Mary Dubrow, and Alice Paul standing outside the 1920 Republican National Convention in Chicago holding a banner

== Personal life and death ==
On August 3, 1910, she married James M. Rector (1877-1932), a prominent Columbus physician at her mother's home. Her wedding dress is housed at Ohio State's Historic Costume & Textiles Collection. The couple had two children, Horace and Gillette. She was a proponent of women retaining their maiden names if they had some acclaim under the name to preserve the family name.

Her sister, Dr. Gillette Hayden, was a pioneering dentist and periodontist in the early 20th century and a founder of the American Academy of Periodontology. Rector's great-grandfather was Dr. Horace H. Hayden, a dentist in the early part of the 19th century. In 1840, Dr. Horace H. Hayden was one of the two founders of the first chartered dental college in the world, the Baltimore School of Dental Surgery, now known as the Dental College of the University of Maryland.

Rector died on May 19, 1973, in Columbus.

== Writings ==
"Women Awake!", 24pp., c.a. 1920, Kenyon Hayden Rector Papers, Ohio Historical Society.

== Papers ==
The Ohio Historical Society in Columbus, Ohio, houses Florence Kenyon Hayden Rector's papers dating from 1893-1934 while The International Archive of Women in Architecture at Virginia Tech in Blacksburg, Virginia, houses some of her papers dating between 1905 and 1907.
