= Grace Rogers Spalding =

American dentist

- Born: 1881
- Died: January 7, 1953 (aged 71–72)
- Education: University of Michigan
- Occupation: Dentist
- Spouse: Edward B. Spalding

Grace Rogers Spalding (1881-January 7, 1953) co-founded the American Academy of Oral Prophylaxis and Periodontology (now the American Academy of Periodontology) in 1914. In 1923, she served as the academy's second female president.

== Education ==
Grace Rogers graduated from the University of Michigan in 1904. She spent an additional year there in postgraduate work from 1904–1905, at the behest of her future husband, dentist Edward B. Spalding.

== Career & later life ==
In 1905, Grace Rogers and Edward Spalding opened a private practice in preventative dentistry in Detroit, Michigan. The two married in 1910 and later had one child.

With Gillette Hayden, she founded the American Academy of Oral Prophylaxis and Periodontology. Rogers Spalding was the first editor of the Journal of Periodontology from 1933 to 1949. In 1950, she was one of the first four women elected to the American College of Dentists. She held several leadership roles in periodontology at a state, national, and international level.
