= Norman William Kingsley =

American dentist (1829–1913)

- Born: October 26, 1829; Stockholm, New York, United States
- Died: February 20, 1913 (aged 83); Warren Point, New Jersey, United States
- Education: Office of Solyman Brown, Baltimore College of Dental Surgery
- Known for: Developer of Orthodontic treatments and Cleft Palatal therapy
- Medical career
- Profession: Dentist
- Institutions: Private Practice
- Sub-specialties: Orthodontics

Norman William Kingsley (October 26, 1829 – February 20, 1913) was an American dentist and artist in the 19th century. He was a major contributor to the early development of orthodontic treatments and cleft palate therapy. He designed fixed and removable inclined planes to correct Angle Class II malocclusions. He designed the first soft-rubber palatal obturators, which enabled patients with cleft palate to enjoy normal speech and function. In 1880, he was the first to introduce the concept of "jumping the bite for patients with a retruded mandible".

== Early life ==
He was born in October 1829 in Stockholm, New York. During his childhood, he migrated to states such as Vermont and Pennsylvania in order for his father to find a job, ultimately returning to upstate New York. He was the eldest of six. At age 15, he left school to work as a store clerk and a bookkeeper.

At age 20 his uncle, Albigence W. Kingsley, who was a dental physician in Elizabeth, NJ introduced him to dentistry. In 1850, Kingsley spent six months at his uncle's practice learning about the job.

== Career ==
In 1852, he started practicing in New York City at the office of Solyman Brown. Brown influenced Kingsley through his talents as a sculptor and writer. Kingsley eventually opened up his own practice in Manhattan. In 1871, he received his Honorary degree from Baltimore College of Dental Surgery.

Kingsley attained skills in sculpturing and was known for his crafts in crafting dental prosthesis. He won two gold medals in a row at World's fair Competitions in New York City (1853) and Paris (1855). He published a report of the case of a child with a V-shaped alveolar arch, in 1858 in the New York Dental Journal. In 1859, Kingsley created an artificial palate of soft vulcanized India rubber for his first patient with a cleft palate. He eventually moved into teaching and founded the New York College of Dentistry, serving as its first dean from, 1865 to 1869. Kingsley was also known for his work related to the vulcanite palatal plate, which consisted of anterior incline that allowed a person to bite forward with their lower jaw. His appliance was later modified by Hotz and was known as Vorbissplatte.

In 1880, he published a textbook, A Treatise on Oral Deformities as a Branch of Mechanical Surgery, which was published in New York and later in Germany and Britain. This was the first comprehensive textbook that talked about orthodontia and dental treatments. It discussed the etiology, diagnosis and treatment planning that should underlie the practice of a working orthodontist. The textbook was the first to discuss cleft palate treatment in terms of orthodontics.

He was a prolific writer with over 100 articles on cleft lip and palate rehabilitation.

He retired in 1904 in New York City.

== Death ==
Kingsley died in Warren Point, New Jersey, on February 20, 1913.
