= Gillette Hayden =

Pioneering dentist and periodontist

- Dr. Gillette Hayden
- Born: March 2, 1880; Greenville, Florida
- Died: 1929; Columbus
- Education: Ohio Medical University
- Occupations: Dentist and periodontist
- Known for: Founder of the American Academy of Periodontology
- Relatives: Florence Kenyon Hayden Rector, Dr. Horace H. Hayden
- Medical career
- Institutions: Northwestern University

Gillette Hayden (1880-1929) was a pioneering dentist and periodontist in the early 20th century. She was a founder of the American Academy of Periodontology and served as the first female President of the organization in 1916.

== Early life and education ==
Gillette Hayden was born on March 2, 1880, in Greenville, Florida. Her family later relocated to Columbus, Ohio where she graduated valedictorian from East High School.

Hayden graduated from the Ohio Medical University, which later became the Ohio State University College of Dentistry, in 1902. She was the third woman to graduate from the Ohio Medical University.

== Career ==
After graduating in 1902, she took graduate work at Northwestern University through 1903, which led to her specialization in periodontology. After practicing in Columbus for a time, she then went to Dresden, Germany as assistant court dentist. She was there for two years of study and practice, introducing methods and treatment of periodontal diseases. Returning in 1908, Dr. Hayden began exclusively practicing periodontology with the philosophy that care and treatment of gums is as important as caring for teeth. Her office was located at 289 East State Street which was designed by her sister Florence Kenyon Hayden Rector.

=== Leadership of dental associations ===
In 1914, she cofounded the American Academy of Periodontology with Dr. Grace Rogers Spalding to help educate dentists about periodontal diseases and their treatment. In 1916, she became president of the association and served almost continuously on the executive council until her death.

Dr. Hayden served as the third President of the American Association of Women Dentists. The AAWD has established the Gillette Hayden Memorial Fund to aid promising women dental students. She also served as the President of the Federation of American Women Dentists in 1924.

=== The Journal of Periodontology ===
The Journal of Periodontology is dedicated to Dr. Hayden. According to the July 1933 Journal, "The Journal of Periodontology is lovingly dedicated to the memory of Doctor Gillette Hayden. Her selfless devotion and untiring efforts in behalf of periodontia and the American Academy of Periodontology, have served as an inspiration to her close associates which can only be consummated by carrying onward the work for which she spent her life."

== Suffragist activities ==
In addition to her achievements in the field of dentistry, Dr. Hayden also maintained an active political life as well, serving as an active suffragist. She was affiliated with the National Woman's Party. Dr. Hayden was the national President of Altrusa International, Inc from 1924 to 1925.

== Personal life ==
Her sister, Florence Kenyon Hayden Rector, was the first licensed female architect in the state of Ohio and also attended Ohio State University. Dr. Hayden officed at 289 East State street, in the Rector building designed by her sister. Dr. Hayden's great-grandfather was Dr. Horace H. Hayden, a dentist in the early part of the 19th century. In 1840, Dr. Horace H. Hayden was one of the two founders of the first chartered dental college in the world, the Baltimore School of Dental Surgery, now known as the Dental College of the University of Maryland.

== Death and legacy ==
Hayden died in 1929 in Columbus at age 49 at her home after an operation. The AAWD established the Gillette Hayden Memorial Foundation in 1930 to help support the future of women dentist leadership.
