= Washington Medical College =

Defunct medical school in Baltimore, Maryland, US

Washington Medical College was a medical school in Baltimore, Maryland. It was founded in 1827, incorporated in March 1833 as The Washington Medical College of Baltimore, renamed Washington University of Baltimore in 1839, closed in 1851, revived in 1867 as Washington University of Baltimore, and disbanded in 1878. The remains were absorbed into the College of Physicians and Surgeons, later merged with the University of Maryland School of Medicine.

== Founding and early growth ==
In the mid-1820s, Pennsylvania native Dr. Horatio Gates Jameson led a group of Baltimore physicians who sought a charter for a new medical school in Baltimore. Jameson was an 1813 graduate of University of Maryland Medical School, where he was later professor of surgery. He was one of the most celebrated surgeons of his day, with a list of published works reaching 2 pages.

Jameson pursued the medical school charter because he was unhappy with the direction and operation of the medical school. During 1825 and 1826, he led a group of like-minded physicians seeking a charter from the Maryland General Assembly for a new Baltimore medical school. They argued that the city had grown to a sufficient size to require a second medical school. After protests from University of Maryland Medical School, the charter did not materialize.

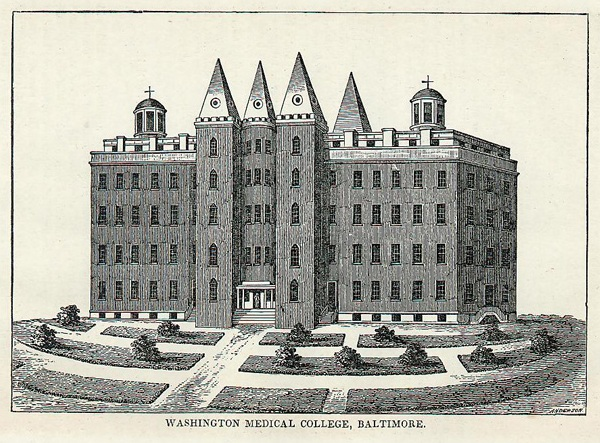
The Washington Medical College building on Fairmont and Broadway used from 1837-1849 shown in 1845.

In spring 1827, Jameson went a different direction and secured a charter from Washington College (now Washington & Jefferson College) in Washington, Pennsylvania. At the time, it was only one of two instances where a college had chartered an institution outside of state. The new school, Washington Medical College, was located on Holliday Street, between Saratoga and Lexington, opposite city hall. Prior to its charter, its degrees were conferred by Washington College in Pennsylvania. While it issued degrees, Washington College did not take a strong leadership role in the development of the medical school. Washington Medical College grew quickly, especially in light of issues with the management of University of Maryland Medical School.

In 1833, a renewed application for a charter was granted by the Maryland General Assembly. Jameson left to go to the Cincinnati Medical School in 1835. His departure began a period of decline, with student enrollment falling to 15 by 1838. The name was changed to Washington University of Baltimore in 1839.

In 1839, the Maryland Legislature passed a supplementary to the original 1833 charter which granted university privileges and authorized the creation of three schools (Law, Divinity, and Arts & Sciences). However, the University decided to do nothing with the additional charter.

After lingering for some time, the school finally collapsed in 1851.

== Revival as Washington University of Baltimore ==
At the end of the American Civil War, Dr. Edward Warren, a Confederate veteran, refounded the university, Warren's school gave express preference to students of the former slave states. as a southern medical school. The charter was revived and the school was re-christened Washington University of Baltimore. The new facility was located at the northwest corner of North Calvert and East Saratoga Streets. This site was later occupied by Baltimore City Hospital after the six Sisters of Mercy (a Roman Catholic order of nuns), and later Mercy Hospital, then Mercy Medical Center. The school created the Maryland Free Hospital. Amid a dispute, the College of Physicians and Surgeons was founded as a splinter institution. In 1872, Washington College began having financial issues, requiring an appropriation from the state of Maryland to survive. In 1878, it closed and was merged into the College of Physicians and Surgeons.

A collection of student theses submitted to the college is held at the National Library of Medicine.

== Alumni ==
- Simon Hullihen, Class of 1832

== See also ==
https://archive.org/details/monkur-vol-1/page/n7/mode/2up - The volume includes handwritten introductory remarks by Dr. John C. Monkur, Professor of Theory and Practice of Medicine at the Washington University of Baltimore Medical School (formerly Washington Medical College)

https://cpparchives.org/repositories/2/resources/1724# - Two volumes of lecture notes from a medical student at Washington University of Baltimore.

- Church Home and Hospital
- Death of Edgar Allan Poe
- Henry Willis Baxley
- History of Washington & Jefferson College

== Sources ==
- Webster, James; Caleb B. Matthews; Isaac Remington (1827). "Washington Medical College". The Medical Recorder of Original Papers and Intelligence in Medicine and Surgery. Vol. XII. Philadelphia. p. 253.
- Davis, N.S. (1877). "Medical Schools Established or Organized Since 1810". Contributions to the History of Medical Education and Medical Institutions in the United States of America 1776-1876. United States Department of Education. pp. 35–37.
- John Forbes; John Connolly, eds. (April–October 1936). "XVI. Washington Medical College (Baltimore)". The British and Foreign Medical Review or Quarterly Journal of Practical Medicine and Surgery. Vol. II. London: Sherwood Gilbert and Piper. pp. 590–591.
- Ashby, M.D., Thomas A. (1912). "The Progress of Medicine in Maryland". In Clayton Colman Hall (ed.). Baltimore: Its History and Its People. Vol. 1. Lewis Historical Publishing Co. pp. 595–596.
- Herbert B. Adams, ed. (1899). "Washington and Baltimore". The Johns Hopkins University Studies in Historical and Political Science. Vol. 17. Johns Hopkins University Press. pp. 581 (footnote).
