= East High School (Columbus, Ohio) =

Public, coeducational high school in Columbus, Ohio, United States

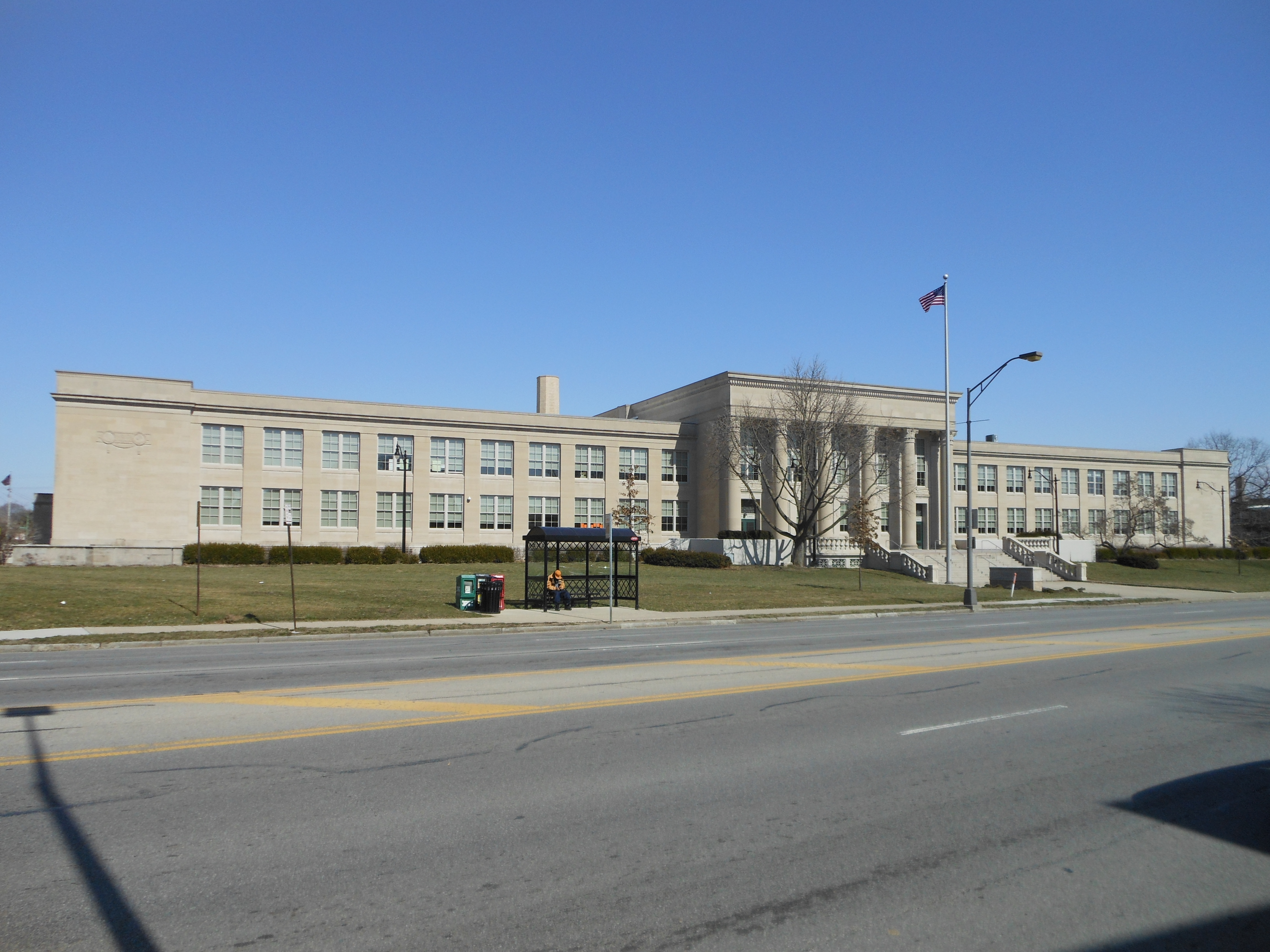

Location
- 1500 East Broad Street; Columbus, (Franklin County), Ohio 43205; United States; 39°58′2″N 82°57′39″W

Information
- Type: Public, Coeducational high school
- Established: 1898
- School district: Columbus City Schools
- Superintendent: Angela Chapman
- NCES School ID: 390438000624
- Principal: Kelvin Watson
- Grades: 9-12
- Enrollment: 437 (2023-2024)
- Student to teacher ratio: 16.19
- Colors: Black and Orange
- Athletics conference: Columbus City League
- Team name: Tigers
- Rival: Linden McKinley High School
- Accreditation: North Central Association of Colleges and Schools
- Website: ccsoh.us/easths

East High School is a public high school located on the near east side of Columbus, Ohio at 1500 E. Broad Street. It is a part of Columbus City Schools. It was originally constructed in 1922.

Renovation work at East High School was completed in December 2008. The work included restoring numerous skylights throughout the building, refinishing the solid woodwork and wrought iron railings, as well as installing energy-efficient lighting fixtures. The new capacity is 1032 students. Included in the renovation was the addition of a 34,000-square-foot (3,200 m^{2}) gymnasium, which features three full-sized basketball courts and seating for 1850 spectators. The total construction cost was $28.2 million.

== Notable alumni ==
=== Politics ===
- Kevin Boyce, member of the Ohio House of Representatives and 47th Ohio State Treasurer
- Hearcel Craig, Columbus City Councilman, member of the Ohio House of Representatives and Ohio Senate
- Latyna Humphrey, member of the Ohio House of Representatives
- Ray Miller, member of the Ohio House of Representatives and Ohio Senate
- Nick Bankston, Columbus City Councilmember

=== Sports ===
- Bernie Casey, NFL player, actor
- Ray Eichenlaub (class of 1911), Notre Dame fullback 1911–1914, College Football Hall of Fame 1972
- Dennis Fowlkes, former NFL linebacker
- Chic Harley, College Football Hall of Fame 1951, Ohio Stadium is "The House That Harley Built"
- Bo Lamar, NBA player
- Jim Marshall, NFL player primarily with the Minnesota Vikings
- Alex Moore, AFL player with the Denver Broncos
- Ed Ratleff, college basketball All-American, Olympian, and NBA player with the Houston Rockets
- Thelma Thall, two-time world table tennis champion
- Granville Waiters, NBA player
- Chuckie Williams, college basketball All-American and NBA player with the Cleveland Cavaliers
- Bill Willis, Ohio State lineman 1941–1944, College Football Hall of Fame 1971, Pro Football Hall of Fame 1977

=== Other ===
- Gillette Hayden, pioneering dentist and periodontist
- Kojo Kamau, artist
- Gardner Rea, cartoonist
- Florence Kenyon Hayden Rector, first licensed female architect in the state of Ohio
- Aminah Robinson, artist
- James Thurber, writer, humorist, cartoonist (attended the original East HS on Franklin Ave.)
- Ann B. Walker, journalist, radio host, and first Black woman from Franklin County to receive a presidential appointment
- D. K. Wilgus (class of 1935), folksong scholar and academic

== Athletics ==
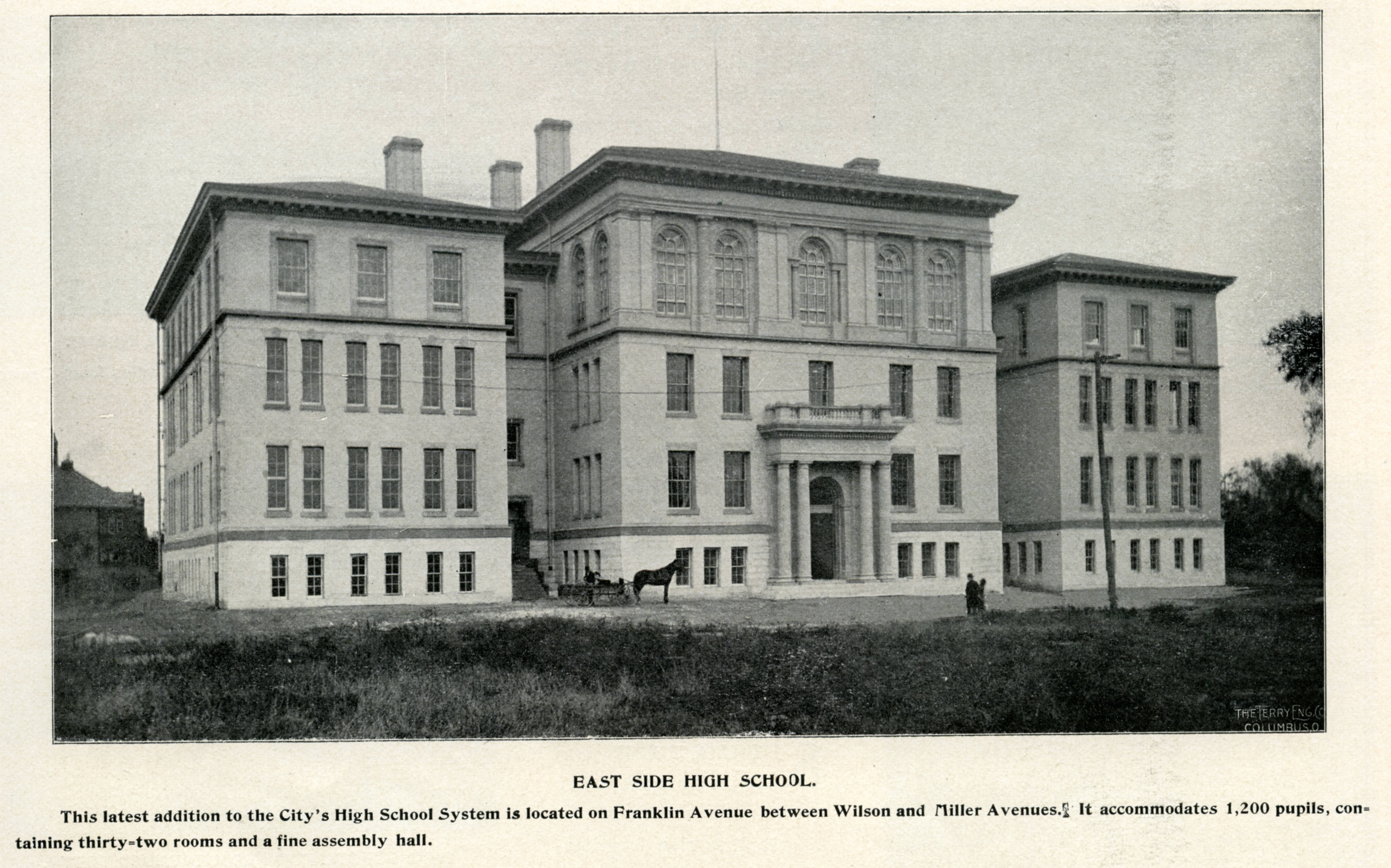
Former building, constructed in 1899

Columbus East won the first state boys basketball championship for the capital city in 1951. This was Columbus, Ohio's first basketball championship for the high school category. This team is considered to be one of the greatest teams in Ohio high school basketball history. The team was composed of Rollie Harris, Romey Watkins, Dick Linson, Ed Granger, and Bill Truss. They were coached by the legendary Paul "Bucky" Walters. This historic team beat the highly favored Hamilton Big Blue in the State finals before a soldout crowd. The Walters team used an advanced defense called the "flat iron" zone. The offense was also ahead of their time relying on the incredible passing skills of Watkins and the "fast break". In the 2022-2023 season the tigers football team made history and won two playoff games in a row at their home field.

=== Ohio High School Athletic Association state championships ===
- Boys Baseball – 1969
- Boys Basketball – 1951, 1963, 1968, 1969, 1979
- Boys Cross Country – 1955
- Boys Gymnastics - 1928, 1931
- Boys Track and Field – 1914
- Girls Track and Field – 1982, 1983

== See also ==
- Schools in Columbus, Ohio
