= Alex Moore (running back) =

American football player (born 1945)

No. 24, 48
- Position: Running back

Personal information
- Born: May 22, 1945 (age 81); West Point, Georgia, U.S.
- Listed height: 6 ft 0 in (1.83 m)
- Listed weight: 195 lb (88 kg)

Career information
- High school: East (Columbus, Ohio)
- College: Norfolk State (1964–1967)
- NFL draft: 1968: 14th round, 369th overall pick

Career history
- Seattle Rangers (1968); Denver Broncos (1968)

Career AFL statistics
- Rushing yards: 22
- Rushing average: 5.5
- Receptions: 3
- Receiving yards: 35
- Stats at Pro Football Reference

Alexander Lee Moore (born May 22, 1945) is an American former professional football running back who played one season with the Denver Broncos of the American Football League (AFL). He was selected by the San Francisco 49ers in the fourteenth round of the 1968 NFL/AFL draft. He played college football at Norfolk State University.

== Early life and college ==
Alexander Lee Moore was born on May 22, 1945, in West Point, Georgia. He attended East High School in Columbus, Ohio.

He was a member of the Norfolk State Spartans from 1964 to 1967.

== Professional career ==
Moore was selected by the San Francisco 49ers in the 14th round, with the 369th overall pick, of the 1968 NFL draft. He played for the Seattle Rangers of the Continental Football League in 1968. The Rangers were a farm team of sorts for the Denver Broncos of the American Football League (AFL). He totaled 58 carries for 189 yards, five receptions for 113 yards, three kick returns for 62 yards, and one punt return for 18 yards during his stint with the Rangers. On October 30, 1968, he was promoted to the Broncos. Moore appeared in three games for the Broncos during the 1968 AFL season, rushing four times for 22 yards while also catching three passes for 35 yards and returning four punts for 74 yards. He became a free agent after the season.
