= Isaac Rieman Baxley =

American poet

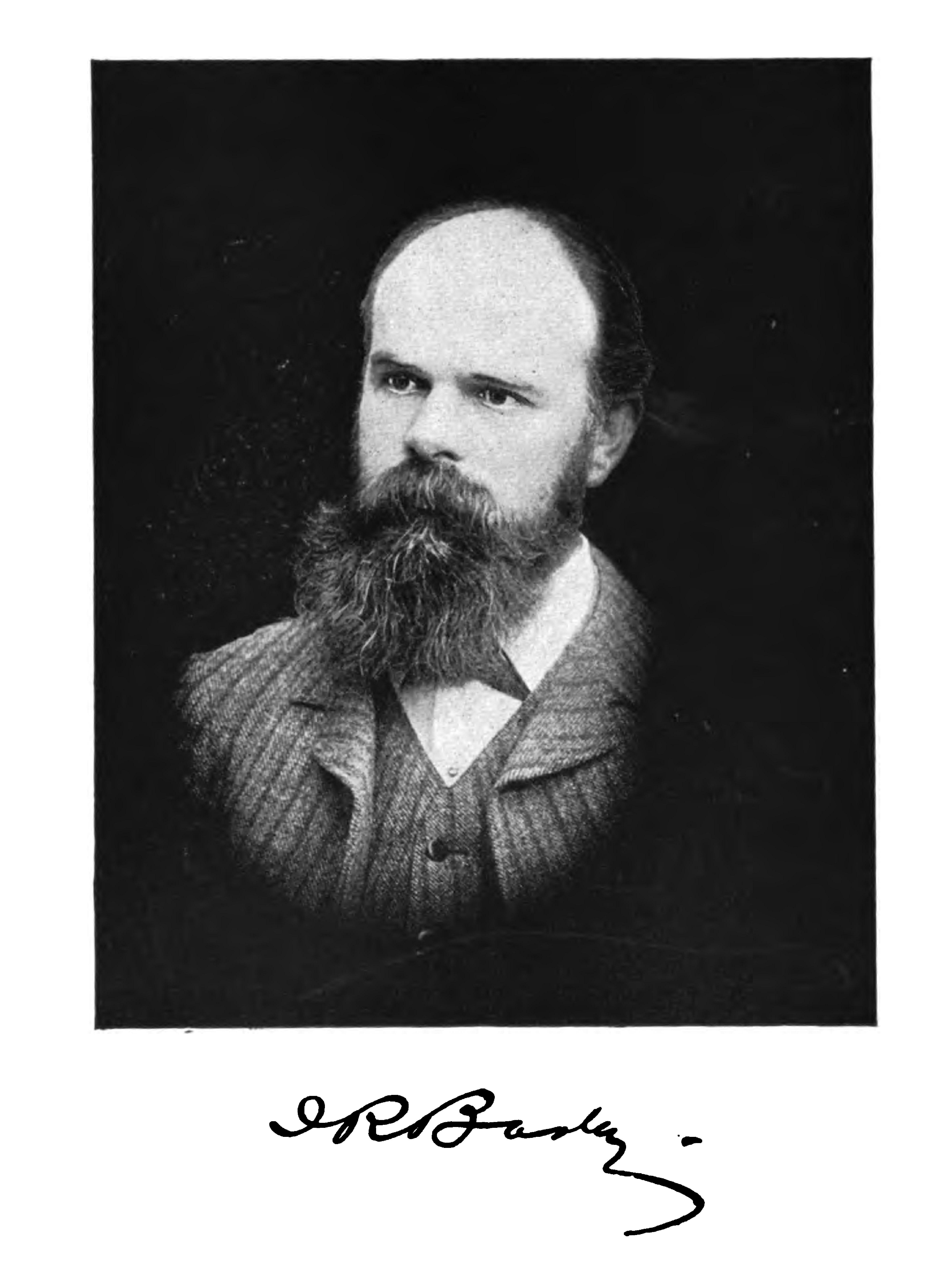
- Born: 1850; Baltimore, Maryland, U.S.
- Died: 1920 (aged 69–70)
- Occupations: Poet playwright

Isaac Rieman Baxley (1850–1920) (Note: Gale Biography and Genealogy Master Index cites two different dates of demise - 1920 and 1930. Both sources have publication dates prior to this time, making the information entirely questionable. His last works seem to have been published in the early 1920s) was an American poet and playwright.

== Life and works ==
Isaac Rieman Baxley was born in Baltimore, Maryland in 1850, the son of Henry Willis Baxley and Mary Virginia Baxley. He had one brother, Claude. Although the family was not Roman Catholic, Isaac was educated at St. Ignatius de Loyola College (now Loyola University Maryland). He passed the bar before the age of twenty-one. Baxley said this was his first legal crime — but the age question was not asked of him. Like many other poets, he practised little and soon abandoned his profession because he wished to write. He travelled a good deal, travelling to Europe twice, and from 1878, he lived in California, making his home in Santa Barbara. The city council appointed him to a special board for the assigning of street names in Montecito.

He commenced to write very early, and "no amount of interference could, at any time, have prevented him from pursuing an action over which he had no abiding control." His opinion of poetry is that "the old issues, customs and manners therein will soon resign themselves to the new movements and aspirations discerned in all spiritual things, and that the Genius of Poetry is ever the furthest sighted in all human eyes; and that her lips are already beginning to open, singing the things she sees. There is no death to Poetry— but those who can not as yet see whither she is moving have said so— but she does not listen to what they say; they, in time, will listen to her again and again."

== Bibliography ==
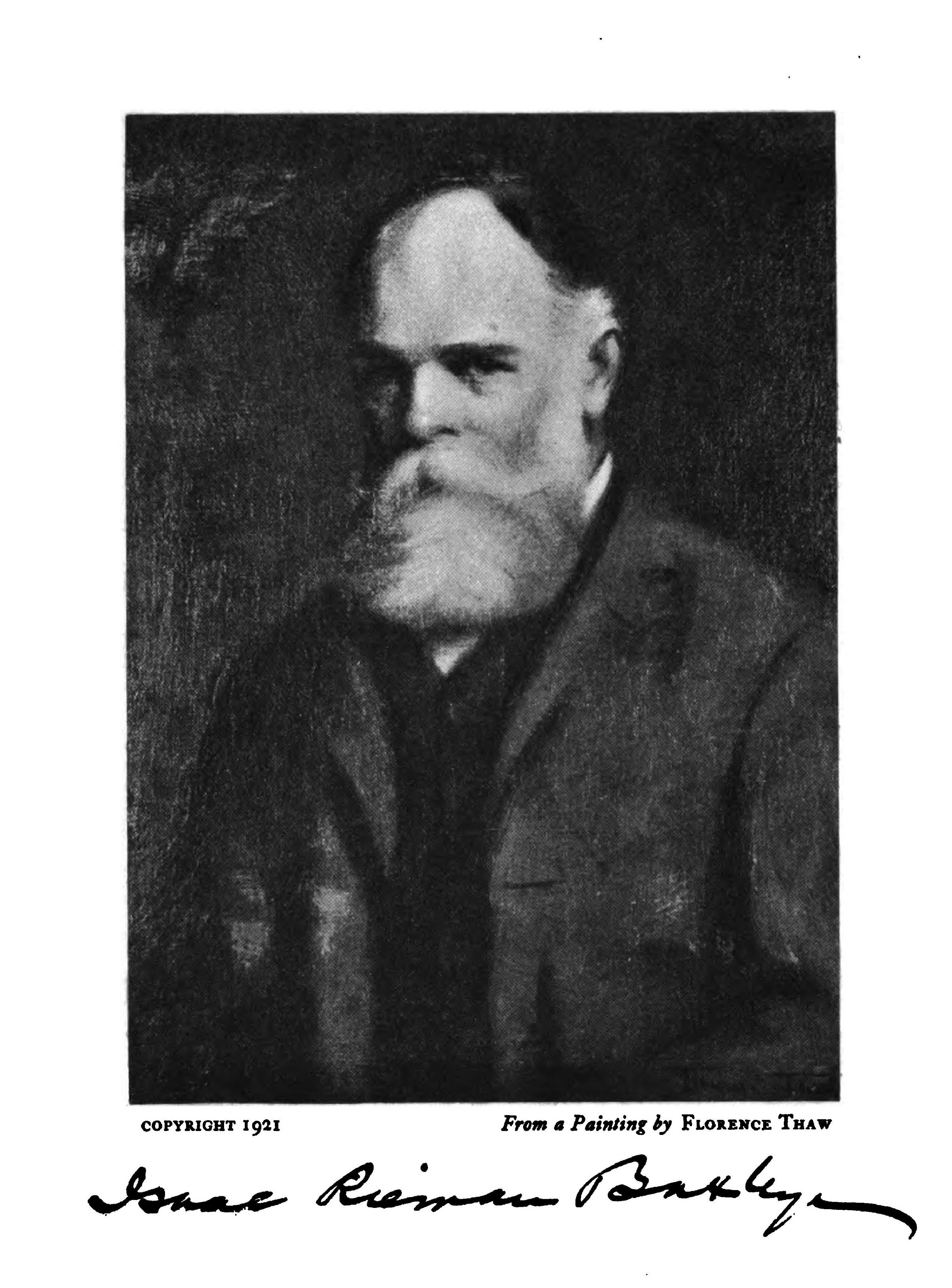
Portrait by Florence Thaw ca. 1920

- The Temple of Alanthur, with other Poems (1886) G.P. Putnam's Sons, New York
- The Prophet, and other Poems (1888) G. P. Putnam's Sons
- Songs of the Spirit (1891) Charles Wells Moulton, Buffalo, New York
- Beyond the Bank of Mist (1896) Peter paul Book Company, Buffalo, New York
- Songs of the Stars (1904) Pacific Press Pub. Co., Mountain View, California
- The Aegean (1916) a play
- Lais: a Grecian Episode (1916)
- The Fire-Woman (1917) a play in two acts
- Poems and Plays, Volume 1 (1921) A.M. Robertson, San Francisco
