= Church Home and Hospital =

- Episcopal Diocese of Maryland

Geography
- Location: Baltimore, Maryland, United States
- Coordinates: 39°17′35″N 76°35′40″W

Organization
- Care system: Private, non-profit
- Type: Teaching

Services
- Emergency department: No
- Beds: 637

History
- Founded: 1833

Links
- Lists: Hospitals in Maryland

Church Home and Hospital (formerly the Church Home and Infirmary) was a hospital in Baltimore, located on Broadway, between East Fayette and East Baltimore Streets, on Washington Hill, several blocks south of the Johns Hopkins Hospital, that also operated a long-term care facility. It was affiliated with the Episcopal Diocese of Maryland of the Episcopal Church (United States). It closed in 1999 and is owned by Johns Hopkins School of Nursing.

== History ==
The location first opened in 1833 as the Washington Medical College. The building was purchased by the Church Home Society of the Protestant Episcopal Church on 2 October 1857 and called the Church Home and Infirmary. Washington Medical College was the medical school connected with Washington College of Pennsylvania (now part of the Washington & Jefferson College).

Edgar Allan Poe (1809–1849) was taken to this location when he was found semiconscious and ill in a street gutter near East Lombard Street; this is where he subsequently died in October 1849.

Emily Nelson Ritchie McLean, who served as the seventh President General of the Daughters of the American Revolution, died here on May 20, 1916.

During the 1940s, Church Home and Hospital was one of three Baltimore hospitals providing a few beds for "colored" patients.

In 1978, a plan to expand the hospital was opposed.

== Current usage of grounds ==
A new 166 unit townhouse development known as Broadway Overlook was built in 2005 by the Housing Authority of Baltimore City on the old grounds of the hospital surrounding it on the south, west and north sides associated with J.H.H.
