= Simon Hullihen =

American dental surgeon

- Born: December 10, 1810; Pennsylvania
- Died: March 27, 1857 (aged 46)
- Education: Washington Medical College
- Known for: Known as the Father of Oral Surgery, one of the first persons to be designated as an oral surgeon
- Medical career
- Profession: Surgeon, Dentist
- Sub-specialties: Oral and maxillofacial surgery Dental surgery

Simon Hullihen (/hʌllɪhɛn/ HULL-i-hen) MD, DDS (December 10, 1810 – March 27, 1857) was a dental surgeon born in Point Township, Pennsylvania. He completed his medical degree and was inspired to seek a career in oral and maxillofacial surgery. Regarded as the first oral surgeon in the United States, he helped to develop many modern techniques of maxillofacial surgery and contributed to the establishment of oral and maxillofacial surgery as a surgical specialty.

== Life ==
Simon was born into an Irish-American family of farmers in Northumberland County, Pennsylvania in about 1810. At about the age of nine, he fell into a lime kiln and hurt both of his feet so badly that he was left bedridden for two years. It was during this experience, frequently treated by local physicians, that he decided to pursue medicine as his career. He obtained his MD from Washington Medical College, in Baltimore in 1832, and also started his career as an instructor there but eventually moved to Canton, Ohio to practice medicine. He then moved to Pittsburgh where he met his future wife Elizabeth, whom he married in 1835, they planned to relocate to Kentucky but Simon became too ill to complete the journey. So instead, they settled along the way in Wheeling, West Virginia, still a part of Virginia at that time, where he opened a practice devoted to surgery of the mouth, head, and neck. In 1857 at about the age of 47, Hullihen died of pneumonia from typhoid fever.

== Career ==
Hullihen's practice in Wheeling gained him accord with other local physicians and he became well known for his pioneering work on the treatment of cleft lip and palate. Hullihen advocated that a cleft lip can be repaired on an infant but a cleft palate cannot be repaired until later ages due to its need for a cooperative patient. In 1842, University of Maryland School of Dentistry, formerly known as Baltimore College of Dentistry, awarded an honorary Doctorate of Dental Surgery to Hullihen. In 1849, he published a paper in American Journal of Dental Science entitled "Case of Elongation of the Underjaw and Distortion of the Face and Neck, Caused by a Burn, Successfully Treated," which is the world's first scientific paper published on an orthognathic surgery.

Hullihen also founded the Wheeling Hospital which established the first hospital-based dental clinic in the United States. During his career he performed around 1,100 orthognathic surgeries including the first mandibular osteotomy surgery to correct a protrusive malposed alveolar segment of the mandible. Due to his achievements, American Association of Oral and Maxillofacial Surgeons dedicated its 55th annual meeting to Hullihen's memory.
