= Pierre Fauchard =

French dentist (1679–1761)

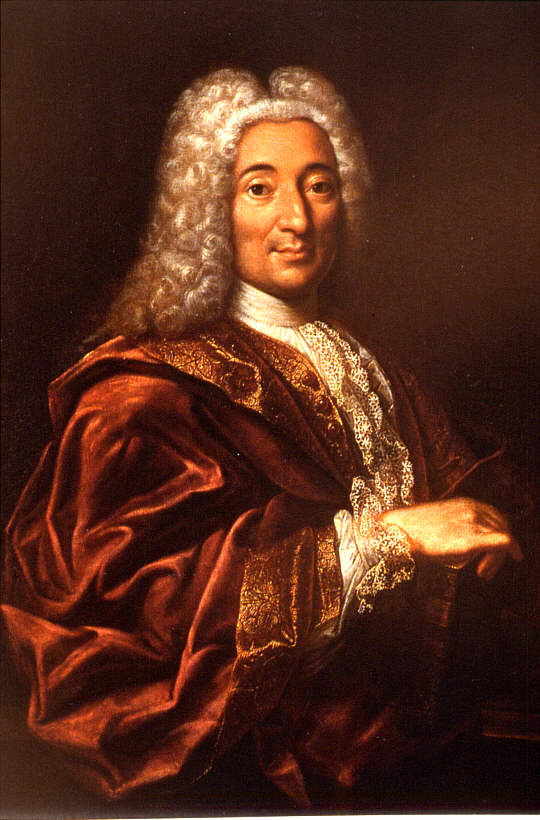
- Portrait of Fauchard by J. Le. Bel
- Born: 2 January 1679; Saint-Denis-de-Gastines, Maine (province), France
- Died: 21 March 1761 (aged 82); Paris, France
- Known for: Introduction of many dental practices
- Awards: The Pierre Fauchard Academy is named after him
- Scientific career
- Fields: Medicine, dentistry
- Institutions: French Royal Navy, Hospital of the University of Angers

Pierre Fauchard (French pronunciation: [pjɛʁ foʃaʁ]; 2 January 1679 – 21 March 1761) was a French physician, credited as being the "father of modern dentistry". He is widely known for writing the first complete scientific description of dentistry, Le Chirurgien Dentiste ("The Surgeon Dentist"), published in 1728. The book described basic oral anatomy and function, signs and symptoms of oral pathology, operative methods for removing decay and restoring teeth, periodontal disease (pyorrhea), orthodontics, replacement of missing teeth, and tooth transplantation.

== Biography ==
=== Early years ===
Fauchard was born in a modest home in Saint-Denis-de-Gastines in 2 January 1679. In 1693 he joined the French Royal Navy at the age of 14, much to his family's distress, and came under the influence of Alexander Poteleret, a surgeon major, who had spent considerable time studying diseases of the teeth and mouth.

During that time, Fauchard learned that sailors who were on long voyages suffered severely from dental ailments, scurvy in particular. Eventually Major Poteleret inspired and encouraged him to read and carefully investigate the findings of his predecessors in the healing arts. He said he wanted to disseminate the knowledge he learned at sea based on actual practice. This idea led Fauchard to become a combat medic as Poteleret's protégé.

=== Life as young dentist ===
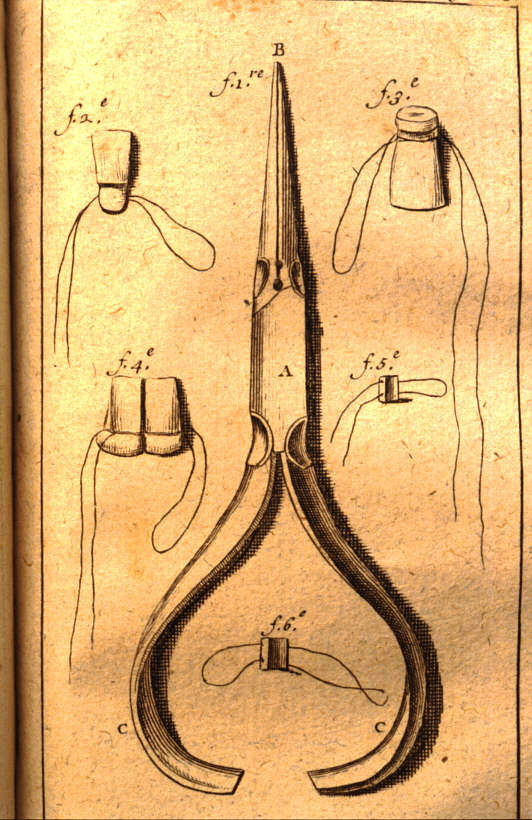
Dental needle-nose pliers designed by Fauchard in the late 17th century to use in prosthodontics

Once Fauchard left the navy, he shortly settled down in Angers, where he practiced medicine at the University of Angers Hospital. In Angers, he started much of the revolutionary medical work we know today, and he was the pioneer of scientific oral and maxillofacial surgery. Fauchard often described himself as a "Chirurgien Dentiste" (surgical dentist), a term very rare at the time as dentists in the 17th century generally extracted decayed teeth rather than treating them.

Despite the limitations of the primitive surgical instruments during the late 17th and early 18th century, Fauchard was considered a highly skilled surgeon by many of his colleagues at Angers University Hospital. Fauchard made remarkable improvisations of dental instruments, often adapting tools from watch makers, jewelers and even barbers, that he thought could be used in dentistry.

Fauchard introduced dental fillings as treatment for dental cavities. He asserted that sugar derivate acids like tartaric acid were responsible for dental decay, and also suggested that tumors surrounding the teeth, in the gums, could appear in the later stages of tooth decay.

Fauchard was the pioneer of dental prosthesis, and he discovered many methods to replace lost teeth. He suggested that substitutes could be made from carved blocks of ivory or bone and those artificially-made dental pieces would be useful as the natural ones. One of this methods stated that the artificial teeth would be held in place by tying them to the remaining solid teeth by pivots, using waxed thread or gold wire. He also introduced dental braces, although they were initially made of gold, he discovered that the teeth position could be corrected as the teeth would follow the pattern of the wires. Waxed linen or silk threads were usually employed to fasten the braces.

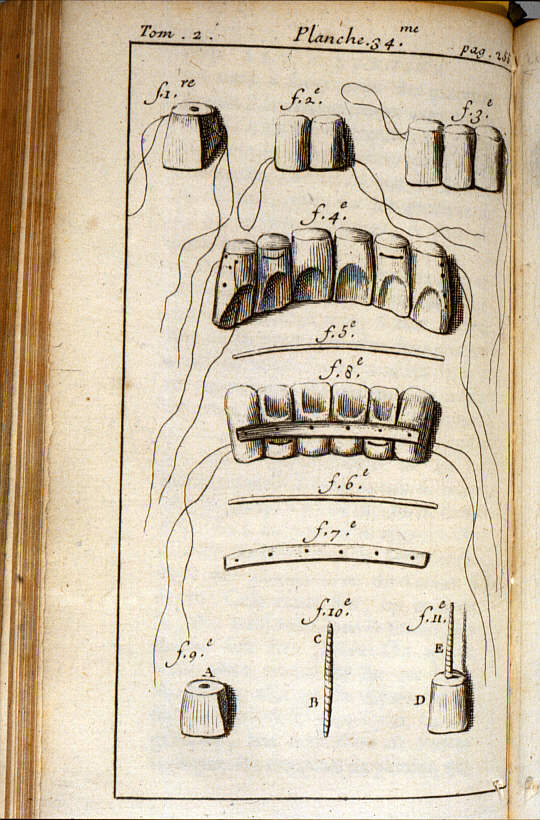
Early 18th century diagram made by doctor Fauchard on his book where he shows the procedure involved in denture construction

=== From Angers to Paris and his revolutionary book ===
During 1716 to 1718, Fauchard gained great prestige. During that time he spent long periods away from home studying and sharing his medical practice with other surgeons across France.

In 1718, Fauchard moved to Paris. During his stay in that city, Pierre realized that many medical libraries lacked good textbooks on dentistry and that an encyclopedic teaching book of oral surgery was needed, so he made the decision to write a professional dentist's treatise based on his medical experience.

For many months Fauchard gathered as many medical research books as he could, interviewed the many dentists he had met, and reviewed his personal diaries during his years at Angers to write his manual. Finally in 1723, at the age of 45, he completed the first 600-page manuscript for "Le Chirurgien Dentiste" (roughly translated as "The Surgical Dentist"). Fauchard sought further feedback from his peers over the next five years, and the manuscript had grown to 783 pages by the time it was published in 1728 in two volumes. The book was well received in the European medical community. A German translation was already available in 1733, an enlarged edition in French was published in 1746, yet an English translation had to await 200 more years to 1946.

== Contributions to dentistry ==
=== Dentistry before Fauchard ===
People would often go to barbers or tooth-pullers to have work done on their teeth instead of doctors. Tooth pullers would often use tools called pelicans to draw teeth. These pelicans were not very precise, and would often pull healthy teeth along with the problematic ones. Sometimes, these pelicans would take out part of the jaw too. Surgeons were trying to gain status during this time and wanted to distance themselves from the tooth-pullers. Hence, Fauchard was rather unusual to be a surgeon who studied teeth at the time.

Literature on teeth was generally found in treatises on surgery, as there were no books written explicitly on teeth at the time.

There was no regulation on who could do work on teeth until the Paris Medical Faculty issued the Edict of 1699, which created the title of expert pour les dents, or "tooth expert," for people certified to do dental work.

=== From craft to science ===
Fauchard bemoaned how the medical community had largely ignored teeth. He said that "The most famous surgeons having abandoned this part of the art, or at least having paid little attention to it, have caused by this negligence, the rise of people who without theory or experience, have degraded it, and practiced haphazard, without principles or method." He believed that too many tooth-pullers were spending too much time learning how to pull teeth through trial and error, and he believed that people who worked with teeth ought to spend more time learning how to preserve teeth instead.

=== Hygiene ===
Fauchard believed that the main way people should keep their teeth clean is by washing their mouth every morning with water and rubbing the teeth with a wet sponge. He also stated that some ethanol mixed with the water would be a sufficient cleaning solution. He stated that toothbrushes ought to use sponge instead of cloth or linen because cloth was too rough and would often wear down the teeth.

Fauchard noted that common dentrifice ingredients such as brick, porcelain, pumic stone, calcined talc, calcined aluminum do more harm than good. The juice of sorrel, lemon juice, spirits of vitriol, and salt were also observed to destroy the enamel. The dentrifice Fauchard recommends is a mixture of coral, dragon's blood, burnt honey, seed pearls, cuttle fish bone, crayfish eyes, bol d'armerie, terre sigillee, terre hematite, canelle, calcined alum, completely reduced to a fine powder and mixed together. However, he recommended only using such a dentrifice if brushing and rinsing with water were not enough.

== "The surgical dentist" ==
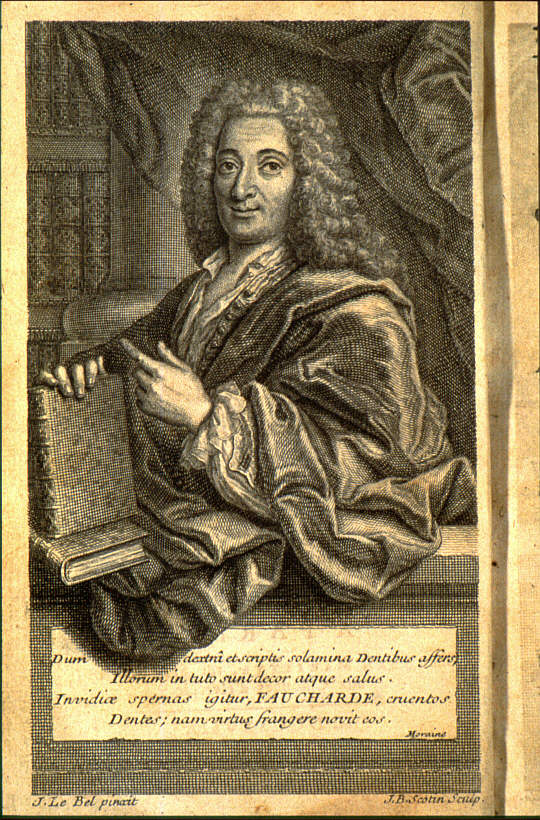
Portrait' of the 1728 version of Doctor Fauchard's book, the "Surgical dentist"

The book consisted of 38 chapters in volume 1 and 26 chapters in volume 2. Subjects in his book included Dental Education, Dental Anatomy, Caries, Pathology, Materia Medica and Therapeutics, Orthodontics, Surgery, Replanting and Transplanting, Reflex Nervous Diseases related to mouth diseases, Pyorrhea, Hemorrhages and Styptics, Operative and Prosthetic Dentistry. In addition, both volumes contained 42 plates depicting surgical instruments and appliances. Many of the ideas introduced in the book were totally new to dentistry. Pierre Fauchard engraved in his books many of his inventions of instruments made for oral surgery, such as the obturator and the now famous dentist's drill. The drill Fauchard developed was manual and powered by a catgut twisted around a cylinder. He also suggested in his book that oil of cloves and cinnamon be used for pulpitis.

The preface of the book was used to bring to attention the dental laws in the Edict of 1699.

Fauchard recommended that human urine be used in the treatment of early stages of caries. A chemical compound that he was not able to identify in urine at the time was ammonia, which was responsible for the "beneficial result" of urine. Although urine had been used for this purpose since the ancient times to Middle Ages, the treatment met with resistance by many physicians and patients.

=== Highlights ===
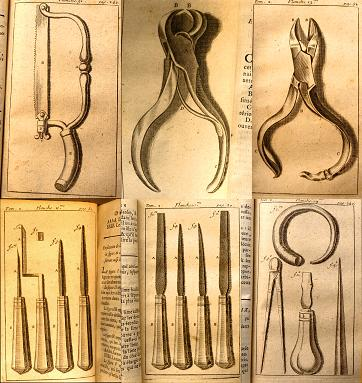
Late 17th-century surgical instruments made by Pierre Fauchard during his research in oral surgery: (from left to right) a saw, two kinds of forceps, (bottom from left to right) two kinds of files and a gimlet.

- Fauchard described the symptoms of 103 mouth diseases, along how to treat them.
- He suggested that the German tooth worm theory was mistaken in its explanation of dental decay. His observations through the microscope showed there was no evidence of worms.
- He also said the cause of dental caries was sugar, and people should limit it from their diet.
- He disproved theories of spontaneous tooth generation, arguing that the first teeth, which are called milk teeth, separate themselves from their roots. Some dentists at Fauchard's time believed they didn't have roots.
- He introduced dental fillings as treatment for dental cavities, and he suggested amalgams like lead, tin and sometimes gold. He also said that teeth should be cleaned periodically by a dentist.
- He said that braces should be used to correct the position of teeth, and that children's teeth could be moved more easily and quickly than adults', a result of the size of the teeth roots, according to Fauchard.
- He was ahead of his time in medical practice and he described the way the patient should be greeted by the doctor and the position in which the patient should sit.
- He recommended that the dentist should stand behind the patient to help them relax, and he introduced the concept of dentist's chair light.

== Final days ==
In his book and all his life Fauchard denounced the quackery and fraud of dental charlatans and their exploitation of patients. He advised his students and friends of the highly injurious techniques used by charlatans and to avoid them. He warned his medical readers that nitric acid and sulfuric acid on teeth to remove tartar used by charlatans were potentially dangerous and explained how to identify their false dental fillings. One of the first physicians to denounce medical malpractice in dentistry, he alleged to a tribunal that many dentists in France did not have a degree or experience.

Fauchard became a model for all dentists to come. He died at the age of 82 in Paris on 22 March 1761. He was designated as Maitre Chirurgien-Dentiste, or master in dental surgery, in his burial record.

== Legacy ==
Doctor Fauchard's late 17th century dentist's drill

Fauchard's work influenced many young medical minds in the Age of Enlightenment in France. Robert Bunon (1702–1748), a dentist like Fauchard, spent many years of his life in enamel hypoplasia research.

Etienne Bourdet (1722–1789), who is said to be one of France's best dentists after Fauchard, based his work mainly on dental prosthesis (a concept introduced by Pierre), he also improved the way the amalgams were made and was the first physician to do gingivectomy on his patients when required.

The American 19th-century dentist Chapin A. Harris often quoted him and said that "considering the circumstances and limitations of his time, he will always be remembered as a pioneer and founder of modern dentistry."

Although Fauchard's famous dental treatise on dentistry was published in the 18th century, it was not until 1946 when Lilian Lindsay, a medical science historian, published a translation in the English language.

The Pierre Fauchard Academy of dentistry, founded in 1936, was named after him.

Fauchard was featured on a stamp in France to commemorate the 200th anniversary of his death in 1961.
