= Ann B. Walker =

American journalist and radio host (1923–2025)

- Born: November 1, 1923; Columbus, Ohio, U.S.
- Died: October 5, 2025 (aged 101)
- Education: East High School; George Williams College; Prairie View A&M University
- Occupations: Journalist, businesswoman, radio personality, editor, columnist, community organizer
- Employer: White House (1980–1991)

Ann B. Walker (November 1, 1923 – October 5, 2025) was an American journalist, editor, radio personality and businesswoman. She is most notable for being the first woman broadcaster to report on the Ohio legislature for NBC4 in Columbus, Ohio, and later became the first woman in broadcast management in the city's and station's history. She was inducted into the Ohio Women's Hall of Fame as the first woman broadcaster to report on the Ohio Legislature in 1978. She was also the first black woman from Franklin County to receive a presidential appointment. Walker turned 100 in November 2023.

== Background ==
On November 1, 1923, Walker was born in Columbus, Ohio. Her mother died when Walker was six years old and she was raised by her father. She had 5 brothers.

She married Linwood B. Walker. They had two children and lived on the North Side of Columbus; however, their home was demolished to build Interstate 71.

Ann B. Walker died on October 5, 2025, at the age of 101.

== Education ==
Walker graduated high school from East High School. She attended Prairie View A&M College in Texas on a tennis scholarship before receiving her bachelor's degree from George Williams College in 1944.

== Career ==
Walker began working at the Ohio Sentinel, one of Columbus's first black newspapers, as a journalist, editor and columnist in 1949. One of her best known columns was called "Ann Walker's Party Line."

In 1952, she worked as assistant news director, community services director and the on-air host of the "Ann Walker Show" and "Youth Speaks" for the Columbus radio station WVKO.

In 1970, Walker served as a Columbus Consumer Protection Committee member.

Later in the 1970s, she began working at the Columbus's WLWC (now WCMH-TV) radio station, where she interviewed Martin Luther King Jr., Angela Davis, and then-presidential candidate Jimmy Carter. It was at WLWC that she became the first woman in broadcast management at the station.

In 1980, she became the creator and host of WCMH-TV's new public affairs program. That same year, President Jimmy Carter appointed Walker as special assistant to the director of The White House Public Affairs Office. She became the first black woman from Franklin County to receive a presidential appointment. Walker founded her own company, Ann B. Walker and Associates, in 1991.

== Affiliations ==
Walker served on the boards of the Columbus Area Leadership Laboratory, Columbus Planned Parenthood, Columbus Metropolitan Club, Columbus Zoo and Aquarium, and the Leukemia Society. She was the first black woman to serve on the Columbus Zoo and Aquarium Board. She was a member of the Alpha Kappa Alpha sorority and served as the 24th Alpha Sigma Omega chapter president in Columbus, Ohio. She was a ruling elder at Bethany Presbyterian Church in Columbus as well.

== Legacy ==
In 2000, she was featured in "Who's who in Black Central Ohio." In honor of her late husband, Walker helped establish the Linwood B. Walker Scholarship in 2004.

In 2021, a plaza located in the King-Lincoln Bronzeville neighborhood was dedicated to Walker by the city of Columbus. She is also featured on the Long Street Cultural Wall.
