= Mercy Medical Center (Baltimore, Maryland) =

Coordinates: 39°17′33″N 76°36′48″W

- Mercy Health Services

Geography
- Location: 345 Saint Paul Place,(between North Calvert, East Pleasant, East Saratoga and St. Paul Streets, facing Preston Gardens) Baltimore, Maryland, United States

Organization
- Type: General

Services
- Emergency department: Yes
- Beds: 178

History
- Opened: 1870/1874

Links
- Website: http://www.mdmercy.com
- Lists: Hospitals in Maryland

Mercy Medical Center is a hospital located in Baltimore, Maryland. Mercy Medical Center has been recognized by U.S. News & World Report's "Best Hospitals" ratings for 2022–2023. Among Adult Specialties, National Rankings, Mercy was rated as High Performing in Orthopedics. The High Performing rating is in recognition of care that was significantly better than the national average, as measured by factors such as patient outcomes.

== Current facility ==
The landmark McCauley Tower building of the hospital along St. Paul Place to the west of North Calvert Street, opened in 1963 and is located at 301 St. Paul Place. Its form was quite unusual in that the upper two-thirds of the building of tan/light brown bricks spread out fifty yards out above the lower five stories. In fall of 2007, Mercy Medical Center received the largest philanthropic gift in the hospital's history to construct a new, $400+ million, 20-story hospital. Three years later, construction of that hospital-—The Mary Catherine Bunting Center—would be complete and officially opened its doors on Sunday, Dec. 19, 2010. Described as Mercy's "replacement hospital", taking the place of the Tower building, features spacious, private rooms for all patients; a 2-story atrium lobby, and state-of-the-art operating rooms with advanced technology, including robotics. The downtown Mercy campus features three garages, the Weinberg Garage (contiguous with the Weinberg Center at 227 St. Paul Place), the McAuley Garage (located at 323 North Calvert Street and provides all-weather bridge access to the Bunting Center, McAuley Plaza and The Weinberg Center); and the Bunting Garage (located on the corner of Pleasant and Guilford at 330 Guilford Avenue; the garage entrance is at 250 E. Pleasant Street).

== History ==
=== Founding ===
Historically, Mercy was founded as "Baltimore City Hospital" by six Sisters of Mercy, a Roman Catholic order of nuns, on November 11, 1874, which was a merger of Washington Medical College and the College of Physicians and Surgeons, earlier institutions from 1870, that the Sisters had been invited to assist with by local doctors. Their buildings were located at the northwest corner of North Calvert and East Saratoga Streets, among which was a former schoolhouse and consisted of a medical dispensary under the later name of "Baltimore City Hospital" (not to be confused with an earlier Baltimore Town and later municipal "Almshouse", founded in 1773, which relocated to the eastern city limits and became known as the "Bay View Asylum", and later known by the 1930s as "The Baltimore City Hospitals" off Eastern Avenue beyond the outer city neighborhoods of Highlandtown, Canton and Greektown. It was west of the large suburban areas in Baltimore County of Essex, Middle River, and northwest of Dundalk and Sparrows Point. It was acquired from the City in 1984 by Johns Hopkins Hospital and Johns Hopkins University at the beginning of their joint expanded statewide medical system, and renamed "Francis Scott Key Medical Center", then later Johns Hopkins Bayview Medical Center). A collection of Baltimore City Hospitals' papers can be found at the National Library of Medicine.

=== Expansion ===
Initially, the Mercy Hospital expanded to the north with buildings along Calvert Street towards East Pleasant Street. By the mid-1950s, the Hospital acquired the structures to the west along St. Paul Street/former Courtland Street, north of East Saratoga and south of East Pleasant Streets, which formerly housed the offices of the Baltimore City Department of Public Welfare (later known as Social Services). These buildings had served the poor and destitute of Baltimore for several decades and a newer renovated structure was now being created on Greenmount Avenue near East Oliver Streets by the Green Mount Cemetery in the early 1950s. So the old Public Welfare structures were available for Mercy to expand into temporarily and later to replace with a new landmark symbol and tower.

Eventually the Mercy medical hospital and nursing school expanded to the west along East Saratoga Street to the neighboring Saint Paul Place.
