= American Board of Periodontology =

- Abbreviation: ABP
- Formation: 1939; 87 years ago
- Headquarters: 737 N. Michigan Avenue; Suite 800; Chicago, Illinois
- Parent organization: American Academy of Periodontology
- Website: www.abperio.org

The American Board of Periodontology (ABP) administers the board certification process for experts in the dental specialty of periodontics. Located in Chicago, Illinois, the board was formed in 1939 by the American Academy of Periodontology to maintain a high standard of care and advance the science and art of periodontology. It is one of the nine specialty boards recognized by the American Dental Association.

Periodontists who have achieved board certification are awarded the title Diplomate in Periodontology to demonstrate to the public that their knowledge and skills have passed the peer-review process.

== History ==
The American Board of Periodontology was founded in 1939 by the American Academy of Periodontology.
