= Chapin A. Harris =

American physician and dentist

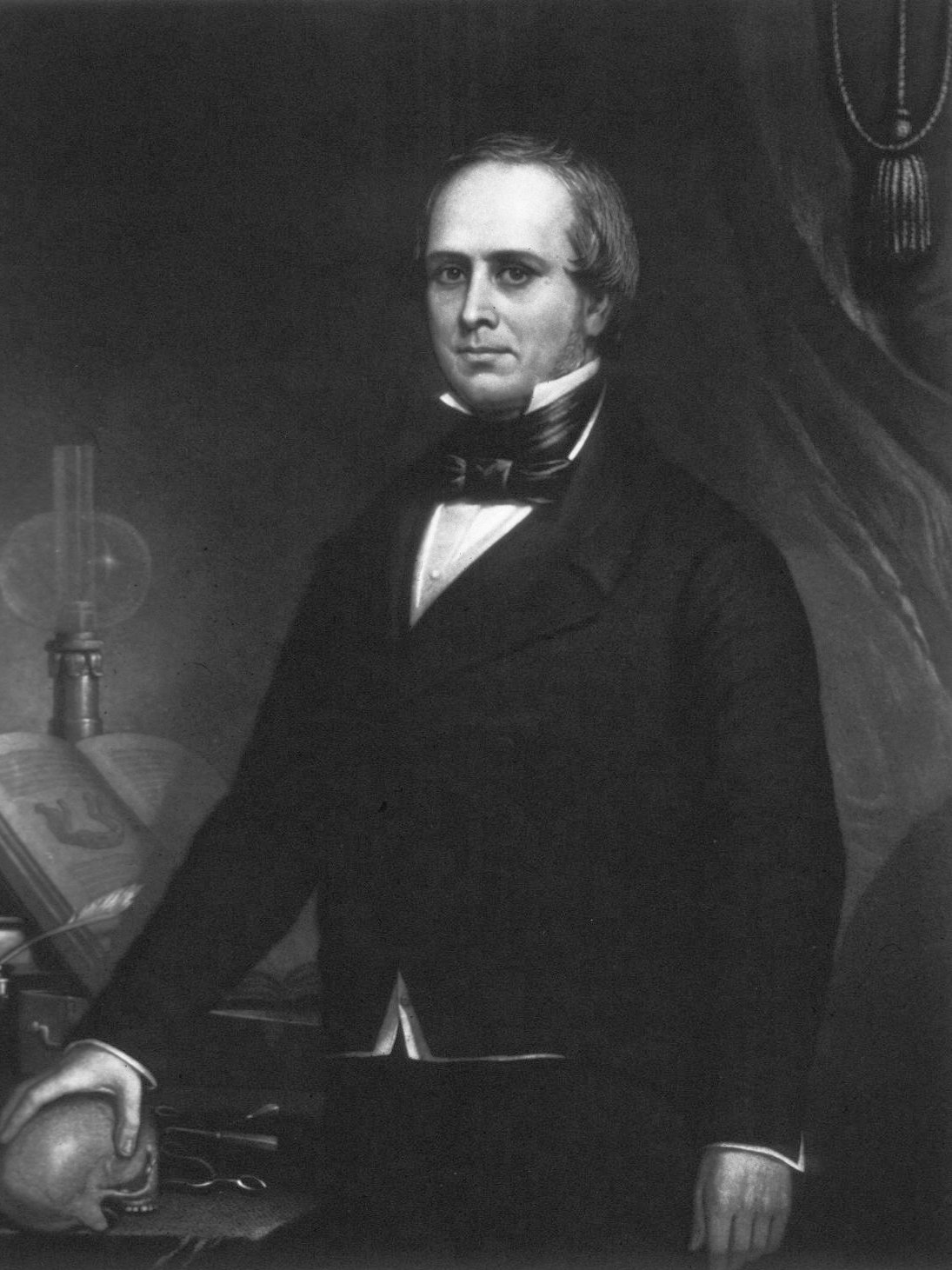
- Chapin Aaron Harris
- Born: 6 May 1806; Pompey, New York
- Died: 29 September 1860 (aged 54); Baltimore, Maryland
- Known for: dentistry
- Scientific career
- Fields: dentistry

Chapin Aaron Harris A.M., MD, D.D.S. (May 6, 1806, in Pompey, New York – September 29, 1860, in Baltimore, Maryland) was an American medical doctor and dentist and dentistry school founder.

== Education ==
At the age of 17 Harris studied medicine in Madison, Ohio, in the office of his brother, Dr. John Harris, who also tutored him in dentistry, a subject which become his main interest. He subsequently passed the Board of Medical Censors in 1824 and was licensed to practice medicine. He soon commenced practice in Greenfield, Ohio, where he remained for about one year, travelling to Bloomfield, Ohio, then Fredericksburg, Virginia. In 1828, Harris turned to full-time dentistry, and by 1833 was a student of Horace H. Hayden located in Baltimore, Maryland. Licensed by the Medical and Chirurgical Faculty of Maryland, Harris conducted an itinerant dental practice throughout the South, before settling permanently in Baltimore in 1835.

Harris received the honorary M. D. degree from Washington Medical College at Baltimore, in which he was a professor in 1838. Shurtleff College in Alton, Illinois, conferred an A.M. degree on him in 1842. His D.D.S. was obtained through membership of the American Society of Dental Surgeons, and an honorary D.D.S. degree was conferred upon him by the Philadelphia Dental College in 1854.

== Achievements ==
Harris is considered one of the founding members of the profession of Dentistry in the United States of America, father of American dental science, and a pioneer of dental journalism. He has been inducted in the hall of fame of the Pierre Fauchard Academy.

=== Contribution to dental literature ===
As early as 1835 Harris became an active contributor to medical and periodical literature as one of the most vigorous and productive dental writers, causing him to be regarded as the founder of dental literature in the US. He was also a contributor to medical and periodical literature.

- 1839: Publication of his first book, The Dental Art, a Practical Treatise on Dental Surgery.
- 1845: Second edition of the above book with a new title: Principles and Practice of Dental Surgery. The book was edited 11 more times with the last edition in 1896. It was the most useful dental textbook of the 19th century.
- 1840: Founder, first chief editor and publisher of the world first dental periodical, the American Journal of Dental Science. He continued as editor until his death in 1860.
- 1842: Publication of Diseases of the Maxillary Sinus.
- 1849: Publication of the Dictionary of Dental Surgery, Biography, Bibliography and Medical Terminology, a volume of 779 pages, the first dental dictionary in the English language, the sixth edition of which appeared in 1898.

=== First national dental organization ===
In 1840 he was the first to respond to the call of Dr. Horace H. Hayden to organize the American Society of Dental Surgeons (ASDS). At a meeting at the home of Solyman Brown BA, MA, MD, DDS, in New York, it was on his motion that the convention to organize a society "resolved that a National Society be formed." He was its first corresponding secretary and its president in 1844. After the disruption of the society in 1856 due to the dental amalgam controversy, he was one of the foremost organizers of its successor, the American Dental Convention, serving as its president in 1856–57. In 1859, a year before his death, another national dental organization, the American Dental Association, was established during a meeting in Niagara, New York. Before 1861 dentists were participant in both dental organizations, which promoted education and research in all aspects of dentistry, including dental materials and remained active throughout the American Civil War (1861–1865). However, during the war, Southern dentists withdrew from them and, in 1869 established the Southern Dental Association. The Southern Dental Association merged with the ADA in 1897 to form the National Dental Association (NDA). The NDA was renamed the American Dental Association (ADA) in 1922.

=== First dental college in the United States ===
With the assistance and advice of three other physicians, he worked tirelessly to establish the first dental school in the world. Apparently his initial attempt was to establish a dental training school attached to the Medical Department of the University of Maryland. This first attempt did not meet with success, possibly due to the opposition of Dr. H. Willis Baxley, one of the dental faculty.

Undaunted, Harris persevered in his efforts, and during the winter of 1839–40, almost single-handedly he gathered the signatures of representative citizens for a petition to the legislature of the state of Maryland for the incorporation of a College of Dental Surgery at Baltimore. Surmounting the opposition of jealous medical rivals, he successfully managed to obtain the charter and with the aid of Horace H. Hayden, Thomas E. Bond, H. Willis Baxley, S. Brown, E. Parmly and others, he organized the Baltimore College of Dental Surgery in 1840. He was the school's first dean and professor of practical dentistry. After Hayden's death in 1844, he became the school's second president.

The establishment of the Baltimore College of Dental Surgery is seen as one of the three crucial steps in the foundation of the dental profession in the United States. " A true profession is built upon a tripod: a formal organization, formal professional education, and a formal scientific literature. The United States was the leader in all three. In 1839–40, the American Society of Dental Surgeons was organized, the Baltimore College of Dental Surgery was established, and the first dental journal in the world, the American Journal of Dental Science, was founded. At that time there were only about three hundred trained and scientific dentists in the entire country; the rest were relatively untrained operators, outright quacks, or charlatans. In 1898, a list of the first subscribers to the first journal was discovered and published by G. V. Black. These initial subscribers may be considered the core group of truly professional American dentists. They became the leaders of the newly born profession of dentistry. " Harris was instrumental in all three.

Harris died on September 29, 1860, due mainly to overwork.
