= Solyman Brown =

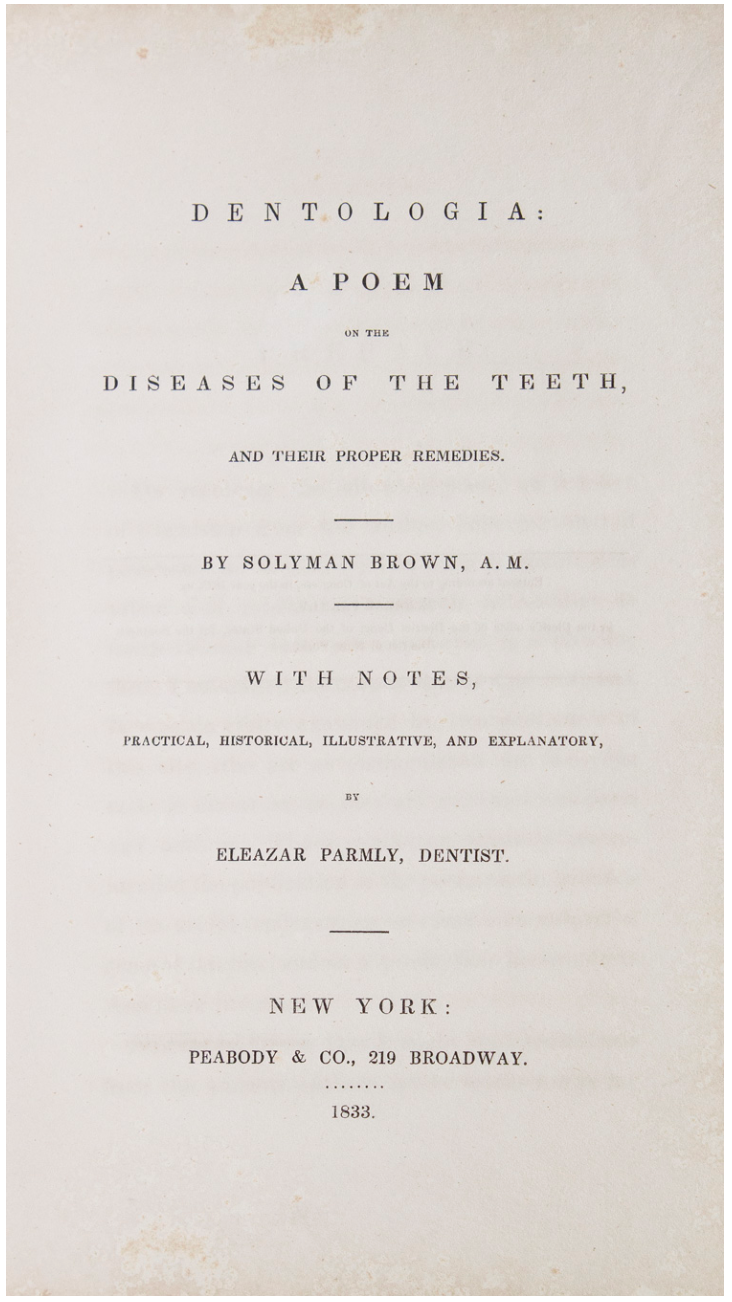
Dentologia, poem by Solyman Brown about the diseases of teeth written in 1833

Solyman Brown (November 17, 1790 – 1876) was an American dentist known for his role in creating the first dental school, the first US National Dental Society, and the first US Dental Journal. He was also known as a poet of dentistry.

== Personal life and major events ==
Solyman Brown was born in Litchfield, Connecticut, on November 17, 1790, son of Nathaniel and Thankful Brown. Renowned for being a member of the Society of Surgeon Dentists of New York City and the State of New York, he was also a founder and a member of the American Association of Dental Surgeons. In 1812, he graduated from Yale College, and two years later, he became a licentiate of the Congregational church. For seven years, he exercised his professional responsibilities, which also involved instructing the youth.

Brown worked in several areas. He graduated with the degrees BA, MA, MD, and DDS from Yale University. He was later a Christian missionary in Connecticut, but disputes with some of the Church leaders led him to a different prominent field. Brown published several books charting his viewpoints on how religion should be portrayed. According to the Journal of the American College of Dentists, Brown was best appreciated for establishing the first dental learning institution in the nineteenth century, the First national Dental Society, and the first dental journal within the United States, which was called the "American Journal of Dental Science."

During his first year in college, he had a severe illness in his lungs. Having been troubled by fragile health and irritation of the bronchia, he was forced almost completely to abandon public speaking to make teaching his full-time career. Brown moved to New York to proceed with his labours as a formal instructor in 1822. Here, he embraced Emmanuel Swedenborg's doctrines and was constituted a regular preacher of the New Jerusalem Church. Nevertheless, he continued to teach until 1832. He married Elizabeth Butler, daughter of Amos Butler, in 1834.

While living in New York City, he was the editor and owner of The New York Mercantile Advertiser. After publishing several articles explaining dental principles and rules, he became an editor of "The American Journal and Library of Dental Science."

Brown also wrote several poems, articles, and essays and consistently contributed to the periodical press, especially to the lines of The New York Mirror. He died in 1876 in Minnesota.

== Poetry, books, and writings ==
Early in his career, Brown turned his hand to poetry. He was best known for "Dentologia, a Poem on the Diseases of the Teeth and their Proper Remedies", an 80-page epic poem that was published in 1833. This raised the status of dentistry status both in the United States and many other parts of the world.

Many of his poems were about dental ailments and possible prevention, management, and treatment. Portions of them were published in the American Journal of Dental Science.

Solyman Brown's poetry was requested by the American Society on February 22, 1822 to recite the narrative poem, "The Birth of Washington," at Washington Hall in New York City during Natal day celebrations of the United States' first president, George Washington. In the same year, he was asked to re-recite the same poem on March 4.

The leading literary journal, The Knickerbocker, published large sections of Brown's poem between 1833 and 1860. In 1838, Brown published another major work on dentistry, "Dental Hygeia, a Poem on the Health and Preservation of the Teeth" which led him to be called the "poet laureate of dentistry."

Brown's most famous writing was "A Treatise on Mechanical Dentistry". Unluckily, it caused the anger and backlash of some of his associate dentists "for revealing the secrets of the profession".

The following are some of his other titles

- A Treatise on Mechanical Dentistry
- The Citizen and Strangers' Pistorial and Business Directory, for the City of New-York and Its Vicinity,
- Union of Extremes: A Discourse on Liberty and Slavery, as They Stand Related to the Justice, Prosperity, and Perpetuity of the United Republic of North America.

== Achievements and impact in medical field ==
Brown was famed for his numerous achievements in different fields, including poetry, religion, and medicine. He successfully coordinated and organised leading dentists to form the first national dental organisation in the world, in which he was the first superintendent and director. He also served as an editor of the first dental journal for two consecutive years, not to mention him authoring many more unpublished writings, some of which were discovered later, after his death, in a trunk full of stuff relating to his life.

Academically, Brown achieved his dream by graduating and receiving a divinity degree from Yale College at 18 years only. He pursued his inspiration to join the ministry at Litchfield and Yale College, from which he was later certified by their board in 1812. He then served as a clergyman of various churches before moving to New York City in 1822. However, his chronic illness caused his voice to fail and stopped the ministry work due to a bronchial infection. He joined Eleazar Parmly, a leading member of a prominent dentist's family. He immediately became Parmly's dentist student and proved to be a skilled practitioner.

In 1839, Solyman Brown urged the Dental Society to build a dental school (which later became the Baltimore College of Dental Surgery). Thus, by the efforts of Brown, Harris, Hayden, and Parmly the first US dental school was established. Given that he lived and worked in New York City, he couldn't continue teaching at the new institution. Nevertheless, he helped to shape the school's goals and curriculum. He also led the group to launch the American Journal of Dental Science.

After 28 years in dental practice, Brown developed complications with his eyes and resolved to start manufacturing synthetic teeth. According to Everest, Brown established the New York Teeth Manufacturing firm to design artificial teeth in larger quantities. The company also published a newsletter, "The Forcep," which failed in 1860.

Another achievement of Brown was correcting the terrible state of dentistry in the 19th Century. According to Ring, American dentistry was in turmoil during the early years of the nineteenth century. Ring notes that there were no proper statutory standards for treating individuals with dental problems. In Ring's words, "Then several visionary practitioners got together and turned the trade of dentistry into a profession; and foremost among these was Solyman Brown, a giant in dentistry who ranks with Chapin A. Harris and Horace Hayden." At that time, no laws existed regulating training dentists and qualifications before allowed to practice dentistry, given that there was no school of dentistry within and outside the United States. Therefore, practitioners were left to make their decisions concerning the establishment and treatment of dental diseases. This was the time when Brown stepped up to help rectify the worsening situation. Together with many farseeing and ethical dentists, such as Harris, Hayden, and Parmly, these men were informed of the necessity for ethical restrictions in dental practice.

Brown was also a skilled woodworker and mason who built fine furniture. To quote Ring, "and when his fortunes fell in his middle years, he built his own house with his own two hands." He enlarged his house by adjoining it with a hall between them.

== Last days and death ==
At the age of 86 in Dodge Centre, Minnesota, Solyman Brown died of pneumonia on 13 Feb 1876.

Before his untimely death, Solyman Brown left a note with the following words; "The truth is that in my present state, I enjoy a great deal and suffer a great deal." He was buried in the state of Minnesota. A monument was erected on his grave to his memory that reads:

"Ever his face was set to go Up toward Jerusalem. Ever he lived and walked as though He saw its golden beam".

His wife, Elizabeth, died seven years later.
