= Journal of Periodontology =

- Discipline: Periodontology
- Language: English

Publication details
- Former names: Journal of Periodontology-Periodontics; Periodontics
- History: 1930–present
- Publisher: American Academy of Periodontology
- Impact factor: 3.8 (2024)

Standard abbreviations
- ISO 4: J. Periodontol.

Indexing
- CODEN: JOPRAJ
- ISSN: 0022-3492 (print); 1943-3670 (web)

Links
- Journal homepage

The Journal of Periodontology is the academic journal of the American Academy of Periodontology (AAP). It was established in 1930.

It is dedicated to Dr. Gillette Hayden. According to the July 1933 Journal, "The Journal of Periodontology is lovingly dedicated to the memory of Doctor Gillette Hayden. Her selfless devotion and untiring efforts in behalf of periodontia and the American Academy of Periodontology, have served as an inspiration to her close associates which can only be consummated by carrying onward the work for which she spent her life."
