= Henry Willis Baxley =

American physician (1803-1876)

Henry Willis Baxley (1803 – 1876) was an American medical doctor who helped to found the Baltimore College of Dental Surgery in 1839. This college has been variously described as the first dental college in the United States, in the world, and in North America.

== Biography ==
Baxley was born in Baltimore, Maryland, in June 1803. There, he was educated at St. Mary's College before beginning at University of Maryland School of Medicine, from which he received his M. D. in 1824. In 1826, he began working as an attending physician at the Baltimore General Dispensary, where he continued to work until 1829. From 1830 to 1831, he was the attending physician at the Maryland Penitentiary. He was named a demonstrator of anatomy at the University of Maryland in 1834, and replaced Eli Geddings as professor of anatomy and physiology at this institution in 1837.

In 1839, Baxley worked with Chapin A. Harris, Horace H. Hayden, and Thomas E. Bond to found the Baltimore College of Dental Surgery. For a year afterward, he taught anatomy and physiology there. He served as professor of surgery at Washington University of Baltimore from 1842 to 1847, and he worked as a physician at the Baltimore Almshouse from 1849 to 1850. In 1850, he moved to Cincinnati, Ohio, where he became chair of anatomy at the Medical College of Ohio. He became chair of surgery there in 1852, and served as the government's inspector of hospitals in 1865. He lived in Europe from 1866 until returning to Baltimore in 1875.

Baxley died in Baltimore on March 13, 1876, aged 72. In his will, he bequeathed $23,836.52 to the trustees of Johns Hopkins University for an endowed professorship. In 1901, Johns Hopkins used this money to establish the Baxley Professorship of Pathology, the first endowed chair in the Johns Hopkins School of Medicine. It was first held by William Henry Welch.
