= European Federation of Periodontology =

Non-profit, scientific dental organisation

The European Federation of Periodontology (EFP) is a global non-profit organisation with a European core that promotes periodontal science and practice, and awareness of oral health and gum disease. Its vision is “Better oral health for all”.

Founded in 1991, the EFP brings together 47 national scientific periodontal societies, representing more than 18,000 oral-health professionals and researchers across six continents. It leads the global conversation on periodontal science and clinical guidelines, working to embed periodontal health into mainstream healthcare as a vital part of general wellbeing.

The EFP also investigates the socio-economic impact of periodontitis to guide strategies for tackling oral-health inequalities, and it is committed to a vision of responsible periodontology.

The Federation pursues its mission by organising evidence-based scientific events and public-health campaigns, including: EuroPerio (the world’s leading congress in periodontology and implant dentistry), Perio Master Clinic (a theme-based, hands-on conference), Perio Workshop (a high-level scientific meeting), and Gum Health Day (a global awareness initiative held annually on 12 May). Through the Journal of Clinical Periodontology, the EFP disseminates the latest research findings, helping to translate evidence into practice.

Additionally, it develops clinical-practice guidelines to provide evidence-based treatment pathways for periodontitis and peri-implant diseases, supporting oral-healthcare professionals worldwide.

The EFP also plays a strategic role in shaping professional education and policy. It defines and promotes high-quality training in periodontology and implant dentistry at all educational levels, and advocates for pan-European recognition of periodontology as a dental speciality.

It is supported by industry partners but operates without commercial agenda, reinforcing its role as a trusted authority in oral health.

== Strategic vision and goals ==
The EFP’s guiding vision of “Better oral health for all” was adopted in 2025.” The vision is encapsulated in the strategic plan for 2026-2030, which aims to establish periodontal health as a cornerstone of global healthcare, ensuring better oral health for all, and which lays the groundwork for sustained progress, so that that oral health remains a priority in scientific research, professional education, and public-health initiatives.

The federation seeks to serve both the professional periodontal and dentistry sector as well as patients and the public.

In seeking to fulfil its strategic vision, the EFP has set out four strategic priorities or "pillars":

- Scientific excellence: strengthening research initiatives, advancing clinical guidelines, and fostering global collaboration to support innovation in periodontology.
- Enhancing and innovating periodontal education: expanding educational programmes, raising certification standards, and developing new learning platforms to equip professionals for the challenges ahead.
- Strengthening policy influence and raising public awareness: positioning periodontal health as a critical element of systemic health, engaging policymakers, and increasing visibility through public campaigns.
- Internal growth and sustainability: ensuring financial sustainability, enhancing governance, and fostering stronger engagement with national societies and international partners.

== History of the EFP ==
The origins of the European Federation of Periodontology (EFP) date back to a conversation in 1985 between Dr Jean-Louis Giovannoli (France) and Professor Ubele van der Velden (the Netherlands). The concept of a united and co-operative body of European societies of periodontology emerged from this conversation. Subsequent discussions and meetings, over the following six years, led to the formation of the Federation.

The European Federation of Periodontology was formally created at a meeting on 12–13 December 1991 in Amsterdam at which the federation’s objectives were adopted and its constitution and by-laws were approved. The newly formed EFP comprised the national societies of periodontology of 11 European countries: the Belgian, British, Dutch, French, German, Irish, Italian, Portuguese, Spanish, Swedish, and Swiss societies.

The EFP’s first scientific congress, called EuroPerio1, was held at EuroDisney in Paris, France, on 12–15 May 1994. Since then, a further 10 editions of the EuroPerio congress have been held.

The first European Workshop on Periodontology (later rebranded as Perio Workshop) was held in February 1993 in Ittingen Charterhouse, Thurgau, Switzerland, focused on “the clinical practice of periodontology”. A further 21 such workshops have since been held, some in partnership with other organisations.

In 1998, the EFP gave its first accreditation to a postgraduate programme in periodontology, to the Academic Centre of Dentistry (ACTA) in Amsterdam, the Netherlands, soon followed by the University of Bern in Switzerland. By 2026 the number of accredited programmes stood at 26 in 16 countries.

The EFP’s flagship publication is the Journal of Clinical Periodontology which has been published since 1974 and which became the official journal of the federation in December 1993. The publisher of the Journal since 2008 has been Wiley Online Library.

The EFP organises, with its national-society members, an annual periodontal-health awareness day held on May 12. Launched in 2014 as the European Day of Periodontology, this awareness day subsequently evolved into Gum Health Day, which aims to be a global event that raises the visibility of periodontology and gum health among the public.

Since 2017, the EFP has run workshops and awareness campaigns in conjunction with its commercial partners. The first of these focused on oral health and pregnancy and subsequent campaigns have covered the links between periodontal disease and caries, diabetes, and cardiovascular disease, and the collaboration between periodontists and family doctors.

In November 2017, the EFP and the American Academy of Periodontology (AAP) joined forces at the World Workshop on Periodontal and Peri-implant Diseases and Conditions in Chicago, USA, to draw up a new classification of periodontal and peri-implant diseases and conditions. Subsequently, the EFP has encouraged clinicians to adopt the new classification and created three S3-level clinical practices guideline on the treatment of periodontitis and peri-implant diseases and conditions in accordance with the new classification.

At its general assembly in October 2020, the EFP launched its Sustainability Manifesto, which commits the federation to ensuring that sustainability is at the heart of all its activities. This was followed by the launch in October 2022 of Responsible Periodontology, a logo that expresses the EFP’s commitment that its activities – promoting disease prevention and healthy lifestyles, educational programmes, and campaigns – are carried out with ethics, respect, and ensuring that all voices count.

In May 2020, in response to the SARS-Cov-2 pandemic, the EFP published a Covid-19 safety protocol for dental practices.

== Purpose of the EFP ==
The prime purpose of the EFP is the promotion of periodontology and, more generally, periodontal and general health both in Europe and worldwide by means of research, education, and the further development of periodontal science.

== EFP member societies ==
The EFP has three categories of membership: full members, associate members, and international associate members. New members are accepted at the federation’s annual general assembly, usually held in March or April.

Full members: Austrian Society of Periodontology, Azerbaijani Society of Periodontology, Belgian Society of Periodontology, British Society of Periodontology and Implant Dentistry, Croatian Society of Periodontology, Czech Society of Periodontology, Danish Society of Periodontology, Dutch Society of Periodontology, Finnish Society of Periodontology, French Society of Periodontology and Oral Implantology, Georgian Association of Periodontology, German Society of Periodontology, Hellenic Society of Periodontology and Implant Dentistry, Hungarian Society of Periodontology, Irish Society of Periodontology, Israeli Society of Periodontology and Osseointegration, Italian Society of Periodontology and Implantology, Lithuanian Association of Periodontology, Norwegian Society of Periodontology, Polish Society of Periodontology, Portuguese Society of Periodontology and Implantology, Romanian Society of Periodontology, Serbian Society of Periodontology, Slovenian Society of Periodontology, Spanish Society of Periodontology and Osseointegration, Swedish Society of Periodontology and Implantology, Swiss Society of Periodontology, Turkish Society of Periodontology.

Associate members: Armenian Periodontists Association, Bulgarian Society of Periodontology, Russian Periodontal Association.

International associate members: Argentinian Society of Periodontology, Australian Society of Periodontology, Brazilian Society of Periodontology, Colombian Association of Periodontology and Osseointegration, Lebanese Society of Periodontology, Malaysian Society of Periodontology, Mexican Association of Periodontology, Moroccan Society of Periodontology and Implantology, Periodontists' Association of Nigeria, Panamanian Society of Periodontology, Philippine Society of Periodontology, Peruvian Association of Periodontology and Osseointegration, Saudi Society of Periodontology and Implant Dentistry, Society of Periodontology Singapore, Taiwan Academy of Periodontology, Uruguayan Society of Periodontology.

== EuroPerio congress ==
The triennial EuroPerio congress is the most important event organised by the EFP and one of the world’s biggest meetings in the field of periodontology. The most recent edition – EuroPerio11 in Vienna (2025) – attracted more than 10,000 attendees from 107 countries and featured hundreds of scientific presentations along with live video transmissions of periodontal surgery.

After EuroPerio1 in 1994, a tfurther 10 editions of the EuroPerio congress have been held. EuroPerio10 was due to be held in June 2021 but, because of the SARS-CoV-2 pandemic, was postponed until June 2022. Each EuroPerio congress is organised by an organising committee – selected at an EFP general assembly – which comprises a chair, a scientific chair, and a treasurer as well as other members including representatives of the EFP-affiliated society in the country that hosts the congress. Since EuroPerio7 in Vienna in 2012, the EFP has used the services of professional conference organiser Mondial Congress & Events to help organise the EuroPerio congresses.

The full list of EuroPerio congresses, with their chairs and scientific chairs is:

- EuroPerio1: Paris, France, 12–15 May 1994. Chair: Jean-Louis Giovannoli. Scientific chair: Pierre Baehni.
- EuroPerio2: Florence, Italy, 15–17 May 1997. Chair: Massimo de Sanctis. Scientific chair: Mariano Sanz.
- EuroPerio3: Geneva, Switzerland, 8–11 June 2000. Chair: Pierre Baehni. Scientific chair: Ubele van der Velden.
- EuroPerio4: Berlin, Germany, 19–21 June 2003. Chair: Jörg Meyle. Scientific chair: Maurizio Tonetti.
- EuroPerio5: Madrid, Spain, 29 June-1 July 2006. Chair: Mariano Sanz. Scientific chair: Stefan Renvert.
- EuroPerio 6: Stockholm, Sweden, 4–6 June 2009. Chair: Stefan Renvert. Scientific chair: Pierpaolo Cortellini.
- EuroPerio 7: Vienna, Austria, 6–9 June 2012. Chair: Gernot Wimmer. Scientific chair: Richard Palmer.
- EuroPerio8: London, UK, 3–8 June 2015. Chair: Francis Hughes. Scientific chair: Mariano Sanz.
- EuroPerio9: Amsterdam, Netherlands, 20–23 June. Chair: Michèle Reners. Scientific chair: Søren Jepsen
- EuroPerio10: Copenhagen, Denmark, 15–18 June. Chair: Phoebus Madianos. Scientific chair: David Herrera.
- EuroPerio11: Vienna, Austria, 14–17 May 2025. Chair: Anton Sculean. Scientific chair: Lior Shapira.
- EuroPerio12 is due to be held in Munich, Germany, in 2028 with an organising committee of Andreas Stavropoulos (Sweden), Virginie Monnet-Corti (France), and Mervi Gürsoy (Finland).

== Perio Workshop (European Workshop on Periodontology) ==
Perio Workshop (originally called the European Workshop on Periodontology) is a scientific meeting in which a group of international experts discuss the latest evidence on topics of relevance to periodontology and implant dentistry and draw up an evidence-based consensus. The findings of each workshop have been published, initially by Quintessence International and, since 2002, as special open-access monographic supplements of the Journal of Clinical Periodontology.

The first European Workshop on Periodontology was held in 1993 and a total of 22 workshops have taken place. The first six workshops chaired by Nikaus Lang. Since 2009, the workshops have been chaired by Mariano Sanz (2009-2019), David Herrera (2020-2025), and Elena Figuero (2026-).

The workshops of 2012 and 2017 were “world workshops”, jointly organised by the EFP and the American Academy of Periodontology (AAP). Several other workshops were held in collaboration with other dental and medical organisations.

The 22 editions of Perio Workshop/European Workshop on Periodontology have covered a wide range of topics in periodontology and implant dentistry:

- 1993: Clinical practice of periodontology.
- 1996: Chemicals in periodontics.
- 1999: Implant dentistry.
- 2002: Periodontal practice.
- 2005: Aetiology and pathogenesis leading to preventive concepts.
- 2008: Contemporary periodontics.
- 2009: EFP-ADEE (European Association of Dental Education). Periodontal education.
- 2010: The biology of periodontal and peri-implant diseases.
- 2011: Quality of reporting of experimental research in implant dentistry.
- 2012: EFP-AAP (American Academy of Periodontology). Periodontitis and systemic diseases.
- 2013: Periodontal plastic surgery and soft-tissue regeneration.
- 2014: Effective prevention of periodontal and peri-implant diseases.
- 2016: EFP-ORCA (European Organisation for Caries Research). Boundaries between caries and periodontal diseases.
- 2017: EFP-APP. World Workshop on the Classification of periodontal and peri-implant diseases and conditions.
- 2018: EFP-Osteology Foundation. Bone regeneration.
- 2019: Clinical-practice guideline for management of stages I-III periodontitis.
- 2021: Clinical-practice guideline for management of stage IV periodontitis.
- 2022: Clinical-practice guideline for management of peri-implant diseases.
- 2023: Education in periodontology in Europe.
- 2024: Contemporary and emerging technologies in periodontal diagnosis.
- 2025: Clinical-practice guideline for periodontal therapy: gingival diseases and acute periodontal conditions.
- 2026: Clinical-practice guideline for periodontal therapy on mucogingival conditions around teeth.

The 2027 Perio Workshop will consider the topic of updating the classification of periodontal and peri-implant diseases.

== Focused Workshops ==
The EFP also organizes Focused Workshops as and when the need arises to address a scientific topic that may not reach the significance and breadth of a full Perio Workshop.

- 2017: Perio-Diabetes Workshop, in collaboration with International Diabetes Federation (IDF) and sponsored by Sunstar.
- 2019: Perio & Cardio Workshop, in collaboration with World Heart Federation (WHF) and sponsored by Dentaid.
- 2021: Periodontology and Family Doctors, in collaboration with WONCA Europe and sponsored by Curasept.
- 2025: Aesthetics and patient-reported outcomes in periodontology and implant dentistry, in collaboration with the Italian Society of Periodontology and Implantology (SIdP) and the Spanish Society of Periodontology and Osseointegration (SEPA). Sponsored by Curasept (SIdP) and Klockner (SEPA).
- 2025: Gingival and periodontal diseases and conditions in children and adolescents, in collaboration with the European Academy of Paediatric Dentistry and sponsored by Colgate-Palmolive.

== Perio Master Clinic ==
Perio Master Clinic is an EFP-organised meeting focused on periodontal clinicians' training and expertise. It was created to “bridge the gap” between the triennial EuroPerio congresses and offers a more intimate environment, with hands-on training by leading clinical practitioners of periodontology and implant dentistry. Since 2019, there have also been related master clinics held outside Europe (since 2023, under the name International Perio Master Clinic).

Eight editions of Perio Master Clinic and International Perio Master Clinic have so far taken place:

- Perio Master Clinic 2014: Paris. Theme: Peri-implant plastic and reconstructive surgery (Chair: Jean-Louis Giovannoli, Scientific chair: PierPaolo Cortellini ).
- Perio Master Clinic 2017: Valletta, Malta. Theme: Peri-implantitis: from aetiology to treatment (Chair: Korkud Demirel, Scientific chair: Stefan Renvert).
- Perio Master Clinic 2019: Hong Kong. Theme: Peri-implantitis: prevention and treatment of soft- and hard-tissue defects (Chairs: Maurizio Tonetti and Stanley Lai, Scientific chair: Stefan Renvert).
- Perio Master Clinic 2020: Dublin, Ireland. Theme: “Hard- and soft-tissue aesthetic reconstructions around teeth and implants – current and future challenges.” (Chair: Declan Corcoran, Scientific chair: Anton Sculean).
- Perio Master Clinic 2023: Antwerp, Belgium. Theme: Perio-Ortho Synergy (Chair: Peter Garmyn, Scientific chair: Virginie Monnet-Corti).
- International Perio Master Clinic 2023: León, Mexico. Theme: “Hard- and soft-tissue aesthetic reconstructions around teeth and implants – current and future challenges.” (Chair: Alejandro Garcia, Scientific chair: Anton Sculean.
- International Perio Master Clinic 2024: Singapore. Theme: “Perio-Ortho Synergy” (Chair: Philip Preshaw, Co-chair: Jonathan Phua, Scientific chair: Virginie Monnet-Corti).
- Perio Master Clinic 2026: Baku, Azerbaijan. Theme: The perio-restorative interplay (Chair: Cavid Ahmedbeyli, Scientific chair: Mariano Sanz).

International Perio Master Clinic 2027 is scheduled to be held in Rio de Janeiro, Brazil on April 30 and May 1, 2027. Theme: The perio-restorative interplay (Chair: Sergio Kahn; Scientific chair: Mariano Sanz).

Perio Master Clinic 2029 is scheduled to be held in Athens, Greece. Theme: Periodontal and implant surgery for 2030 and beyond (Chair: William Papaioannou; Scientific chair: Martina Stefanini).

== New classification and evidence-based guidelines on periodontal and peri-implant diseases ==
At the World Workshop on the Classification of Periodontal and Peri-implant Diseases and Conditions, held in Chicago in November 2017, the EFP and the American Academy of Periodontology (AAP) drew up a new classification of periodontal and peri-implant diseases and conditions after reviewing the scientific evidence and creating a consensus knowledge base. This new classification updated the previous classification of 1999. The World Workshop’s research papers and consensus reports were published simultaneously in June 2018 in the EFP’s Journal of Clinical Periodontology and the AAP’s Journal of Periodontology. The new classification was presented formally by the two organisations at the EuroPerio9 congress in Amsterdam on 22 June 2018.

To assist clinicians in implementing the new classification, the EFP published a toolkit in April 2019, comprising a set of guidance notes, slide presentations, infographics, and videos.

At Perio Workshop 2019, the process of drawing up a formal S3-level clinical-practice guideline for the treatment of periodontitis stages I-III was started. This guideline was published in July 2020 in a special supplement of the Journal of Clinical Periodontology.

This guideline approaches the treatment of periodontitis (stages I, II and III) using a pre-established stepwise approach to therapy that, depending on the disease stage, should be incremental, each including different interventions. Consensus was achieved on recommendations covering different interventions.

Perio Workshop 2021 then created another S3-level clinical-practice guideline for the treatment of stage IV periodontitis, published in June 2022 in a special supplement of the Journal of Clinical Periodontology. This was followed by the guideline for the multidisciplinary treatment of peri-implant diseases, created at Perio Workshop 2022 and published as a Journal of Clinical Periodontology supplement in June 2023. Perio Workshop 2025 focused on periodontal therapy for gingival diseases and acute periodontal conditions, which are being published as three separate guidelines in the Journal of Clinical Periodontology. The first of these guidelines, on the management of acute periodontal conditions, was published in September 2026.

These guidelines inform clinical practice, health systems, policymakers –and, indirectly, the public – on the available and most effective modalities to treat periodontitis and to maintain a healthy dentition for a lifetime, according to the evidence at the time of publication. The EFP has produced a series of infographics for dental professionals explaining some of the main aspects of the clinical-practice guidelines.

== EFP Probe ==
In May 2025, during the EuroPerio11 congress, the EFP launched the EFP Probe, a new diagnostic instrument designed to bring screening and treatment functions together in a single tool. The EFP Probe, developed in collaboration with HuFriedyGroup, is designed to align with the current classification of periodontal diseases and conditions and with the EFP's clinical practice guidelines, thereby making diagnostic decisions more consistent and straightforward for clinicians.

== Gum Health Day ==
The EFP organizes, together with its affiliated national societies of periodontology, an annual periodontal-health awareness day held on May 12. Launched in 2014 as the European Day of Periodontology, this awareness day subsequently evolved into Gum Health Day, which aims to be a global event that raises the visibility of periodontology and gum health among the public. The following awareness days have been organised:

- European Day of Periodontology 2014. Slogan: “Association between periodontal diseases and systemic conditions.”
- European Periodontology Day 2015. Slogan: “Gum health links with oral and general health.”
- European Periodontology Day 2016. Slogan: “Healthy gums for a better life.”
- European Gum Heath Day 2017. Slogan: “Fighting periodontal disease together.”
- European Gum Health Day 2018. Slogan: “Health begins with healthy gums.”
- Gum Health Day 2019. Slogan: “Healthy gums, beautiful smile.”
- Gum Health Day 2020. Slogan: “Say no to bleeding gums.”
- Gum Health Day 2021. Slogan: “Gum diseases are preventable.”
- Gum Health Day 2022. Slogan: “Treat your gums."
- Gum Health Day 2023. Slogan: “Healthy gums look good on you! Protect them!”
- Gum Health Day 2024. Slogan: “Gums rock! Keep them safe!”
- Gum Health Day 2025. Slogan: “Gums rock! Keep smiling!”
- Gum Health Day 2026. Slogan: "Empowering lives through knowledge".

Gum Health Day 2026 marked the beginning of a three-year awareness campaign built around the concept of "empowering lives". The 2026 focus of "Empowering lives through knowledge" will be followed by "Empowering lives through self-care" in 2027 and "Empowering lives through wellbeing" in 2028.

== The EFP's role in education ==
Education has been fundamental to the EFP’s mission since the federation’s inception. At a meeting in May 1990 in Maastricht, the Netherlands, where the constitution and rules of procedure of what would the following year become the EFP were proposed, among the aims of the new organisation were:

“To promote equal and high standards in the countries of the member societies in the areas of […]

- Undergraduate periodontal education by deciding on the minimal requirements of a periodontal training programme for recognition by the EFP.
- Graduate periodontal education by deciding on the minimal requirements for a periodontal specialisation programme for recognition by the EFP and a periodontal training centre to be recognised by the EFP as a qualified training centre.”

In 1998, the EFP gave its first accreditation to a postgraduate programme in periodontology, to the Academic Centre of Dentistry (ACTA) in Amsterdam, the Netherlands, followed later that year by the University of Bern in Switzerland. As of November 2026, there were 26 universities in 16 countries teaching EFP-accredited programmes in periodontology:

- University of Queensland, Brisbane, Australia.
- KU Leuven, Belgium.
- University of Ghent, Belgium.
- University of Liège, Belgium.
- University Paris Cité, France.
- University of Strasbourg, France.
- Goethe University Frankfurt, Germany.
- Aristotle University, Thessaloniki, Greece.
- National and Kapodistrian University of Athens, Greece.
- University of Hong Kong, Hong Kong.
- Trinity College, Dublin, Ireland.
- Rambam Health Care Campus, Haifa, Israel.
- Hebrew University Medical Centre, Jerusalem, Israel.
- Tel Aviv University, Israel.
- University of Florence, Italy.
- Sapienza University of Rome, Italy
- University of Turin, Italy.
- Academic Centre of Dentistry Amsterdam (ACTA), the Netherlands.
- Oslo University, Norway.
- University of Porto, Portugal.
- International University of Catalonia (UIC), Barcelona, Spain.
- Complutense University of Madrid, Spain.
- University of Bern, Switzerland.
- Yeditepe University, Turkey.
- King’s College, London, United Kingdom.
- UCL Eastman Dental Institute, London, United Kingdom.

The EFP organises a biennial Postgraduate Symposium involving second- and third-year students of the programmes, together with the programme directors and co-ordinators. The symposium provides opportunities for the postgraduate students to present their clinical or research work. It is also intended to encourage networking between students of the various EFP-accredited programmes. Each symposium is organised by a different programme. Nine symposia have been held so far: in Switzerland (2005), the Netherlands (2007), Turkey (2009), the United Kingdom (2011), Belgium (2013), Spain (2015), Ireland (2017), Sweden (2019), Belgium (2022), the Netherlands (2024), and Spain (2026).

In 2018, the EFP launched EFP Alumni, a community that represents periodontists who have received the EFP certificate after completing their accredited masters’ courses at one of the accredited programmes together with members of the faculties that teach the courses.

In terms of undergraduate education, the EFP issued the booklet “Curricular Guidelines in Undergraduate Education” in 1996, which was distributed to dental schools and periodontal departments in Europe, and to national societies of periodontology, the Association for Dental Education in Europe, and the American Academy of Periodontology.

In 2016, the EFP conducted a survey of undergraduate education in periodontology to find out to what extent dental schools were meeting the objectives and learning outcomes as defined in Curricular Guidelines and to evaluate the preclinical and clinical work done by students during their undergraduate training. The survey found a huge diversity in the way periodontology was taught at the undergraduate level.

Also in 2016, the Journal of Clinical Periodontology published the EFP Delphi study on trends in periodontology and periodontics in Europe for the year 2025, which predicted an increase in the need for education in periodontology, especially at university level.

== EFP publications ==
The EFP’s Journal of Clinical Periodontology (JCP), published monthly, is a leading scientific publication and has one of the highest impact factor of journals in dentistry, oral surgery, and medicine. Its impact factor for 2025 was 8.3 (Clarivate), with a journal citation indicator (Clarivate) of 2.68 and a CiteScore (Scopus) of 12.9.

Since April 2026, the Journal of Clinical Periodontology has been edited by Nikos Donos, who succeeded Panos N. Papapanou (2020-2026), Maurizio S. Tonetti (2005-2020), and Jan Lindhe (1976-2004). The JCP became the official journal of the EFP in 1993. It was first published in 1974 and its first editor (1974-1976) was Hans Rudolf Mühlemann.The aim of the Journal of Clinical Periodontology is to provide a platform for the exchange of scientific and clinical progress in the field of periodontology and allied disciplines, and to do so at the highest possible level. The JCP also aims to facilitate the application of new scientific knowledge to the daily practice of the concerned disciplines and addresses both practicing clinicians and members of the academic community.

The Journal is the official publication of the European Federation of Periodontology but serves an international audience by publishing contributions of high scientific merit in the fields of periodontology and implant dentistry. The journal accepts a broad spectrum of original work characterized as clinical or preclinical, basic or translational, as well as authoritative reviews, and proceedings of important scientific workshops. The journal’s scope encompasses the physiology and pathology of the periodontal and peri-implant tissues, the biology and the modulation of periodontal and peri-implant tissue healing and regeneration, the diagnosis, aetiology, epidemiology, prevention and therapy of periodontal and peri-implant diseases and conditions, the association of periodontal infection/inflammation and general health, and the clinical aspects of comprehensive rehabilitation of the periodontitis-affected patient.

The EFP also publishes the monthly research summary JCP Digest, which offers concise research in periodontology to enable clinicians to keep their knowledge up to date, summarizing studies first published in the Journal of Clinical Periodontology. Edited by James Deschner (chair, EFP scientific affairs committee), with the co-operation of the JCP editor-in-chief, each issue is prepared by a team of students at one of the EFP-accredited postgraduate periodontology courses.

In November 2024, the EFP launched its Publications Hub, a new section on its website that provides access to the Journal of Clinical Periodontology, the JCP Digest, the Perio Talks podcasts, and a range of articles that offer expert views on periodontal science and clinical practice.

EFP Perio Talks podcasts were launched in June 2022 and feature experts discussing key topics in periodontology and implant dentistry, ranging from peri-implantitis and periodontal regeneration to the financial and human cost of gum disease and the role of AI in dentistry.

Special publications by the EFP include:

- Winning margins: The impact of oral health on athlete performance (2026), a report commisioned by the EFP from Economist Enterprise on the interactions between oral health and athletic success.
- Time to put your money where your mouth is: Addressing inequalities in oral health (2024), a report commissioned by the EFP from the Economist Intelligence Unit (EIU) which analyses the growing burden of periodontitis and caries and proposes a unified approach to enhance oral- and systemic-health outcomes.
- Time to take gum disease seriously: the societal and economic impact of periodontitis (2021), a report commissioned by the EFP from the Economist Intelligence Unit (EIU) which analyses in depth the financial and human cost of gum disease in six European countries.

These two reports, which include detailed economic models, help the EFP in its lobbying and campaigning work and highlight the importance of preventing periodontitis and promoting oral health.

== The EFP on social media ==
The EFP actively communicates via social media on the platforms platforms Facebook (@efp.org), Instagram (@perioeurope), LinkedIn (The European Federation of Periodontology), X (@perioeurope), YouTube (EFP European Federation of Periodontology), and TikTok (@perioeurope and @yourgums).

== Partners ==
The EFP’s work is supported by its partners, commercial companies involved in the periodontal and dental sector whether as consumer brands or as providers of equipment and materials to dental practitioners. Their support helps the EFP in performing its work of serving the development of periodontal science and clinical practice and the promotion of oral health.

As of November 2026, the EFP’s partners were Colgate, Curasept, Dentaid, Dentsply Sirona, Haleon, Kenvue, Oral-B, Philips, and the Straumann Group. The EFP also collaborates actively on specific projects with other sponsors and exhibitors, notably in the framework of the EuroPerio congresses.

The EFP believes that “the transparent collaboration between businesses and an informative non-profit-making scientific entity is a great asset for strengthening the links between science and commercial development, which greatly benefits professionals in periodontology, dentistry, and oral hygiene, as well as the general interest of the public.”

== Campaigns ==
Since 2017, the EFP has organized workshops and outreach campaigns with its partners focusing on specific areas of concern within periodontology. The materials produced by these campaigns are written by experts and based on the latest scientific evidence. Materials include scientific reports, recommendations, graphics, and videos. In some cases, dedicated workshops on the campaign topic were held first to review the evidence.

- Oral Health and Pregnancy (2017), sponsored by Oral-B.
- Perio & Diabetes (2018), sponsored by Sunstar, based on the findings of Perio-Diabetes Workshop (2017) organized by the EFP with the International Diabetes Federation, also sponsored by Sunstar.
- Perio & Caries (2018), sponsored by Colgate. Based on the findings of Perio Workshop 2016.
- Perio & Cardio (2020), sponsored by Dentaid. Based on the findings the Perio & Cardio Workshop (2019) organized by the EFP with the World Heart Federation, also sponsored by Dentaid.
- Perio & Family Doctors (2023), organised by the EFP with Wonca Europe, sponsored by Curasept. Based on the findings of the Focused Workshop on Periodontology and Family Doctors (2022), also sponsored by Curasept.
- The Journey to a Healthy Smile (2024), sponsored by Colgate.
- Oral health throughout life (2025), sponsored by Dentaid.

All these campaigns have material for clinicians and patients that can be downloaded from the EFP website.

== Prizes and awards ==
The EFP awards four prizes: the Jaccard/EFP Prize for Periodontal Research (given every three years at the EuroPerio congress), the annual Postgraduate Research Prize in EFP-accredited postgraduate programmes in periodontology, the Undergraduate Essay Prize, and the EFP Digital Innovation Award (supported by Haleon).

The EFP makes two annual awards: the EFP Distinguished Scientist Award and the EFP Distinguished Service Award. Other awards, the EFP Eminence in Periodontology Award and the EFP International Eminence in Periodontology Award, are awarded on an occasional basis. The EFP Eminence in Periodontology award has been conferred on Ubele van der Velden (2014), Gianfranco Carnevale (2015), Mariano Sanz (2021), Iain Chapple (2022), Maurizio Tonetti (2023), and Anton Sculean (2024). The International Eminence in Periodontology has been awarded to Bob Genco (2020), William Giannobile (2023), Mark Bartold (2024), and Purnima Kumar (2026).

== Recognition of the speciality of periodontology ==
In 2005 the European Directive on the Recognition of Professional Qualifications was approved. It was noted that periodontology was recognized as a speciality in 11 European Union member states. Since then, the EFP has been actively seeking recognition of periodontology as a speciality at the European level, starting with the publication in 2006 of the paper “Periodontology as a Recognized Dental Speciality in Europe” and continuing with the lobbying of European policymakers. The EFP believes that official recognition as a speciality frees periodontists from bureaucratic problems by enabling greater professional mobility and would also boost the exchange of knowledge, increase graduate applications, aid training, and increase access for patients.

At present, periodontology is recognised as a speciality in 11 of the 27 members of the EU: Belgium, Bulgaria, Croatia, Hungary, Latvia, Lithuania, Poland, Portugal, Slovenia, Sweden, and Romania. It is also recognized as a speciality in the UK, which left the EU in 2020. In several countries, there has been strong resistance to speciality recognition from dental associations, which are worried that the recognition of more dental specialties may limit the scope of practice for general dental practitioners. In September 2019, the question of the EU-wide recognition of periodontology as a speciality was discussed at a meeting of the EU Group of Co-ordinators (GoCs) for professional qualifications and freedom of movement.

== The EFP in the media ==
Articles about the EFP, its work, and its campaigns have appeared in both the specialist and the general media in various countries. Such articles include:

"Bite of success: Oral Health may influence athletic performance", HealthCare Asia Daily, 26 June 2026.

"Gli atleti? Hanno problemi a denti e gengive", La Repubblica, 24 July 2026.

“The economic burden of tooth decay is highest in deprived groups”, BDJ Team 12, 60 (2025).

“Gum health: A key indicator of women’s overall well-being”. Medical Express, 7 March 2025.

“Why Oral Hygiene is Crucial to Your Overall Health”, New York Times, 7 May 2023.

"Why the health of your gums could save your life".The Times, 16 February, 2021.

“Hormone haben Einfluss auf Mundgesundheit von Frauen“, Kleine Zeitung, 12 May 2025.

“Hormone beeinflussen Mundgesundheit”, Science.orf.at, 12 May 2025.

“Eltern sollten Kindern die Angst vor dem Zahnarzt nehmen”, Familiii, 15 May 2025.

== Structure of the EFP ==
The EFP’s executive committee consists of the president, the president-elect, the two most recent past presidents, the secretary general, the treasurer, and two elected members. The president serves a one-year term, while the other committee members are elected for terms of three years.

The executive committee discusses all actions that should be taken by the EFP and prepares them for discussion and approval at the annual general assembly, which consists of representatives of the EFP-affiliated national societies of periodontology.

Seven committees have been formed to meet the needs of the objectives that EFP has set: the congress committee, European projects committee, communications & engagement committee, nominating committee, education committee, scientific affairs committee, workshop committee. There are also committees for each edition of EuroPerio and Perio Master Clinic.
