= American Academy of Periodontology =

The American Academy of Periodontology (AAP) is the non-profit membership association for periodontists-dental professionals specializing in the prevention, diagnosis, and treatment of diseases affecting the gums and supporting structures of the teeth and in the placement and maintenance of dental implants.

The AAP was founded in 1914 by Drs. Gillette Hayden and Grace Rogers Spalding. In 1916 Gillette Hayden served as its first female president.

The AAP currently has 7,500 members including periodontists and general dentists from all 50 states and around the world. The AAP also publishes the Journal of Periodontology, a monthly scholarly journal.

The mission of the AAP is to champion member success and professional partnerships for optimal patient health and quality of life. Periodontics is one of nine dental specialties recognized by the American Dental Association. Additionally, the AAP aims to educate the public about the link between periodontal disease and systemic diseases and advocates for periodontal science, research, and clinical advances.

Membership in the AAP is open to all licensed dentists and offers important professional benefits and services.

== See also ==
- American Academy of Periodontology Foundation
- American Board of Periodontology
