= American Academy of Periodontology Foundation =

The American Academy of Periodontology Foundation is a non-profit, charitable foundation that promotes public awareness of periodontal disease, provides funding for research fellowships to produce new knowledge related to periodontal health, and provides educational grants to periodontists in training. The AAP Foundation was established in 1990 in Chicago, Illinois. The foundation issues $400,000 in support annually, and has awarded $3.7 million in grants, fellowships, and scholarships.

The mission statement of the foundation is "to improve the periodontal and general health of the public through increasing public and professional knowledge of periodontal diseases and their therapies, stimulating basic and clinical research to generate new knowledge, and enhancing educational programs at all levels to create opportunities in periodontal education and practice."

== Board Members and Directors ==
=== OFFICERS ===
- President: John H. Kobs
- Vice-President: Vanchit John
- Secretary-Treasurer: Vincent J. Iacono
- Immediate Past President: Ronald Tarrson

=== DIRECTORS ===
- John M. Forbes
- Stuart J. Froum
- Maria L. Geisinger
- Joan Otomo-Corgel
- Jody Rodney
- Christopher Richardson
- Myron Nevins
- Nancy L. Newhouse
- Fotinos S. Panagakos
- Terry D. Rees, ABP Representative
- S. Timothy Rose

==== Executive Directors ====
- Robert A. Vitas 2010–Present
- Mary Beth Whalen 1990-1999
- Sharon Mellor 1999-2009

== Related Pages ==
- American Academy of Periodontology
