= Horace H. Hayden =

American dentist (1769–1844)

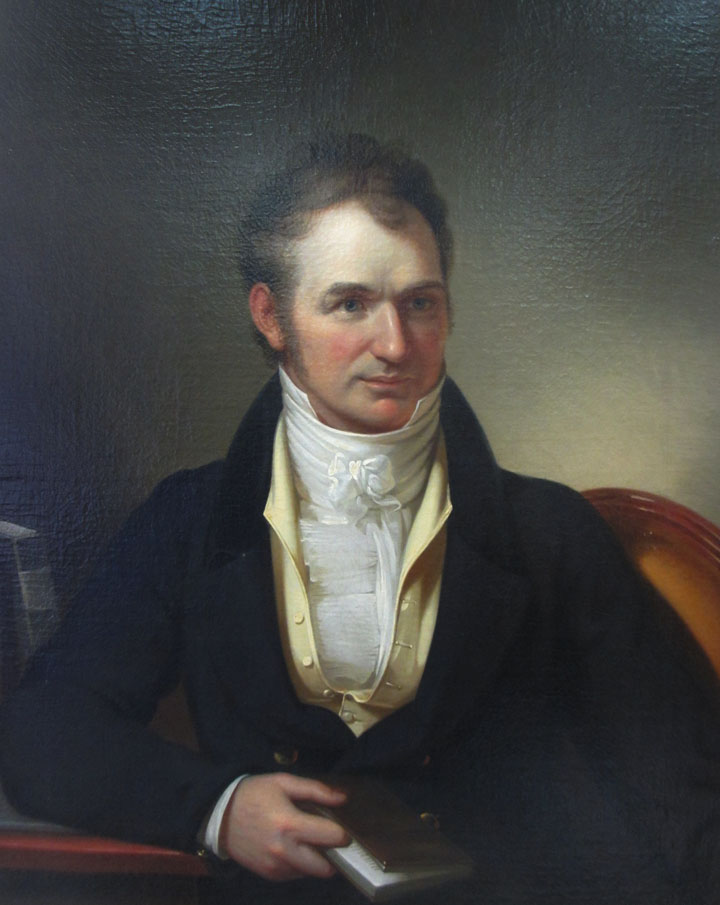
- Portrait by Rembrandt Peale, 1828
- Born: Horace Henry Hayden; October 13, 1769; Windsor, Connecticut, U.S.
- Died: 25 January 1844 (aged 74); Baltimore, Maryland, U.S.
- Known for: First licensed American dentist and dentistry school founder
- Scientific career
- Fields: Dentistry

Horace Henry Hayden D.D.S. (October 13, 1769 – January 25, 1844) was the first licensed American dentist and dentistry school founder.

== Education ==
Hayden was born in Windsor, Connecticut. After working as a cabin boy, architect and schoolteacher, Hayden consulted with John Greenwood, George Washington's personal dentist, in 1795 in New York City. Thereafter, he began the study of dentistry under Greenwood's tutelage. In 1800, Dr. Hayden began a dental practice in Baltimore, Maryland. Dr. Hayden was issued a license by the Medical and Chirurgical Faculty of Maryland in 1810, the first for the practice of dentistry in the United States of America. During the War of 1812, he served as a private in the 39th Regiment, Maryland Militia, and later as an assistant surgeon.

Between 1819 and 1825, he delivered a series of lectures on dentistry to medical students at the University of Maryland, the first in the new world. Dr. Hayden was one of the founders of the Maryland Academy of Sciences and served as its president in 1825. In 1820, as a pioneer geologist and botanist, he published the first general work on geology to be printed in the United States. He discovered a new mineral, named Hadenite in his honor.

Hayden was the cofounder, with Chapin A. Harris, of the Baltimore College of Dental Surgery, the world's first dental school, chartered in 1840. Hayden was the school's first president.

== Achievements ==
Hayden is considered the father of the profession of Dentistry in the United States of America, architect of the American system of dental education and organizer of American professional dentistry. He has been inducted in the hall of fame of the Pierre Fauchard Academy.

== Family ==
His great-granddaughters were periodontic dentist Gillette Hayden and architect Florence Kenyon Hayden Rector.
