= Pierre Fauchard Academy =

The Pierre Fauchard Academy is a volunteer-run, non-profit dental organization that was founded by Dr. Elmer S. Best, a dentist from Minnesota in 1936. The objective is the independence from commercial interests in dental research and its publications. Dr. Best endeavored to raise the professional standards. The academy is named after Pierre Fauchard (1678–1761), a French dentist who is considered the "Father of modern dentistry". Fauchard wrote a book entitled Le Chirurgien dentiste, ou Traité des dents, the first dental textbook of modern times.

== Statutes ==
The statutes of the Pierre Fauchard Academy are based on the objectives of Elmer Best and its focus is on integrity and leadership of dentists. A primary objective at the time of its foundation is to preserve the independence of scientific publications. Goals are to have as Fellows the most outstanding dentists in every country in the world and to select and induct individuals of the highest ethical, moral and professional standards.

== Organization ==
The Pierre Fauchard Academy currently consists of more than 5,000 Fellows, who are organized in 120 sections. 55 are located in the United States and 65 in countries of South America, Europe, Asia, Africa and Australia. Members are dentists who are among the most outstanding leaders in the various fields of dentistry. Fellowship in the academy is by nomination and is designed to honor past accomplishments in field of dentistry and encourage future productivity. Membership must be supported by the section in which the dentist resides. The academy is administered by a board of trustees consisting of five officers and eleven trustees from around the world. Section organization includes a chairperson and such other officers or committee members as the Section may elect. The office of the academy is located in Rockville (Maryland).

== Historical workup ==
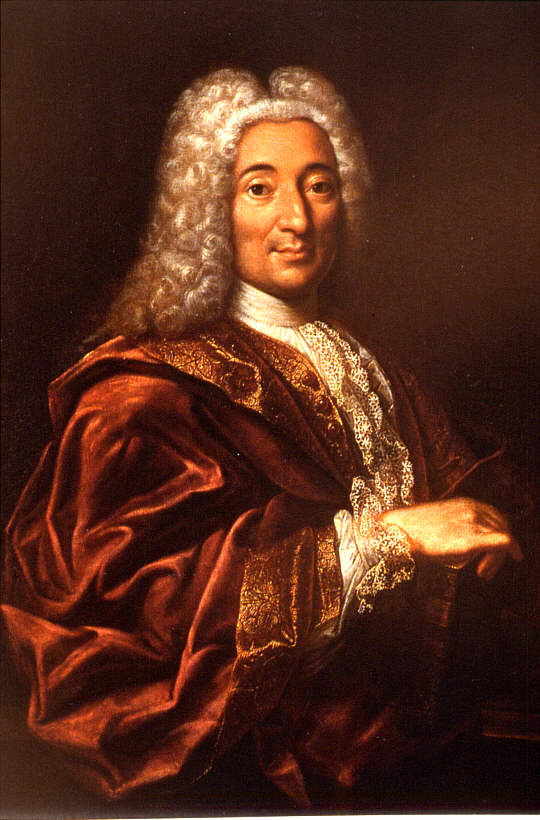
Pierre Fauchard, the namesake of the academy (color engraving of J. Le. Bel)

Part of the work of the academy is the historical workup of dentistry. For this purpose, the CVs of the main leaders and researchers of dentistry are presented.

== Honors ==
The Pierre Fauchard Academy maintains a "Hall of Fame of Dentistry", in which the principal researcher in the field of dentistry are included. In addition, it gives annual awards, including the Fauchard Gold Medal Award, the Elmer S. Best Memorial Award, the Presidential Award of Excellence, Awards of merit and honorary memberships.

== Publications ==
The academy publishes two monthly journals, the Dental World and Dental abstracts.

== Foundation ==
The academy maintains the PFA Leadership Foundation, which provides leadership training programs for PFA Fellows. The Oral Health Foundation, which supports projects that are dedicated to the dental research is also associated.
