= List of dental journals =

This is a list of medical journals in dentistry by specialty.

== Periodontics ==
- Journal of Clinical Periodontology
- Journal of Indian Society of Periodontology
- Journal of Periodontology

== Orthodontics ==
- American Journal of Orthodontics and Dentofacial Orthopedics
- The Angle Orthodontist
- Journal of Clinical Orthodontics
- Journal of Dental Biomechanics
- Journal of Orthodontics
- Seminars in Orthodontics

== Prosthodontics ==
- European Journal of Prosthodontics
- European Journal of Prosthodontics and Restorative Dentistry
- Journal of Indian Prosthodontic Society
- Journal of Prosthetic Dentistry
- Journal of Prosthodontics

== Pediatrics ==
- International Journal of Paediatric Dentistry
- Journal of Pediatric Dentistry

== Oral surgery ==
- Cleft Palate-Craniofacial Journal
- Dental Traumatology
- International Journal of Oral and Maxillofacial Surgery
- Journal of Oral and Maxillofacial Surgery
- Oral Surgery, Oral Medicine, Oral Pathology and Oral Radiology

== Endodontics ==
- Journal of Endodontics

== General (restorative) dentistry ==
- Brazilian Dental Journal
- British Dental Journal
- Caries Research
- Clinical, Cosmetic and Investigational Dentistry
- Community Dentistry and Oral Epidemiology
- Dental Materials
- Dental and Medical Problems
- Frontiers of Oral Biology
- International Journal of Oral Science
- Journal of the American Dental Association
- Journal of Conservative Dentistry
- Journal of Dental Research
- Journal of Dentistry
- Primary Dental Journal

== Oncology ==
- Oral Oncology

== Oral radiology ==
- Journal of Oral and Maxillofacial Radiology
- Oral Surgery, Oral Medicine, Oral Pathology, Oral Radiology and Endodontics
