= List of dental organizations =

This is a list of various national and international dental organizations from around the world.

== Australia ==
- Australian Dental Association Inc.

== Canada ==
- Canadian Association of Orthodontists
- Canadian Dental Association
- Royal College of Dentists

== Europe ==
- European Federation of Periodontology
- International Association of Paediatric Dentistry

== India ==
- Indian Dental Association
- Dental Council of India

== Seychelles ==
- Seychelles Medical and Dental Association
- Seychelles Medical and Dental Council

== Sweden ==
- Swedish Dental Association
- Swedish Dental Society

== United Kingdom ==
- General Dental Council - Regulatory Body
- NHS - Public Healthcare Dentistry
- British Dental Association
- Oral Health Foundation
- British Orthodontic Society
- Dental Professionals Association
- The Faculty of General Dental Practice (UK)
- Orthodontic Technicians Association

== United States ==
- American Dental Association
