= Bernadette Drummond =

New Zealand professor of dentistry

Bernadette Drummond ONZM
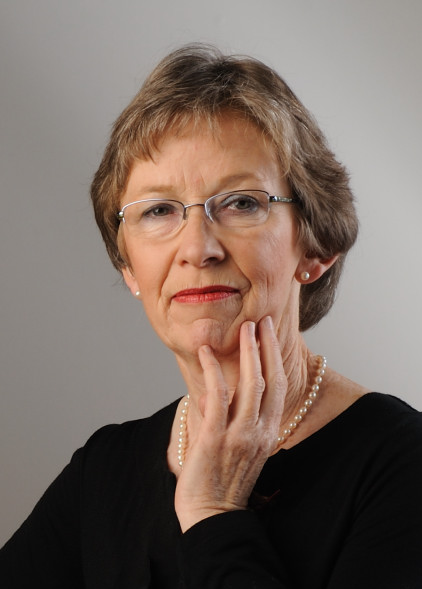

Academic background
- Education: University of Leeds
- Thesis: Effect of fluoride on developing enamel and the use of saliva to monitor systemic fluoride absorption (1988)

Bernadette Kathleen Drummond ONZM is a New Zealand dental academic, and was the first woman full professor in dentistry at the University of Otago. She is a specialist paediatric dentist, and past president of both the Royal Australasian College of Dental Surgeons and the Australian and New Zealand Society of Paediatric Dentistry.

== Academic career ==
Drummond undertook her dentistry training with a Bachelor of Dental Surgery at the University of Otago, and then completed a MS degree from the University of Rochester in 1982. Drummond earned a PhD titled Effect of fluoride on developing enamel and the use of saliva to monitor systemic fluoride absorption at the University of Leeds. Drummond then joined the faculty of the University of Otago in 1988, rising to full professor in 2012. She moved back to the UK to take a position as Professor and Head of Pediatric Dentistry at the University of Leeds in 2017.

Drummond is a specialist pediatric dentist. Her research focuses on oral health and quality of life in children, and she is an advocate of for water fluoridation, as a means to reduce caries in young children. Drummond and colleagues Marina Kamel and Murray Thomson showed that children in fluoridated areas of Otago suffered less tooth decay requiring treatment under general anaesthetic than children from areas without fluoridated water.

Drummond is a past president of the Royal Australasian College of Dental Surgeons and in 2011 was made an honorary fellow. She was president of the Australian and New Zealand Society of Paediatric Dentistry from 1995 to 1997, and is an honorary life member.

In 2020 Drummond was nominated for a positive impact award at the University of Leeds.

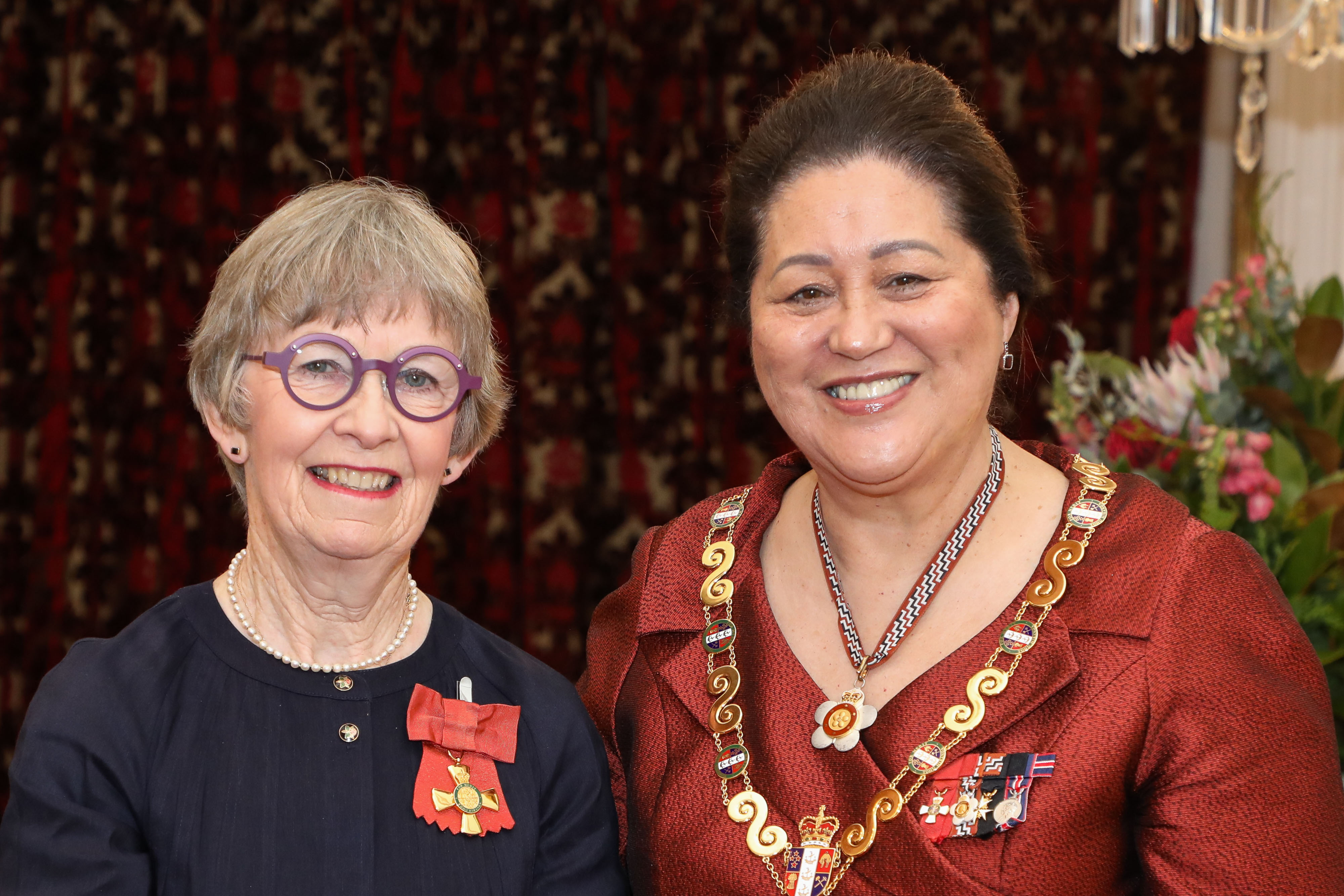
Drummond (left), after her investiture as an Officer of the New Zealand Order of Merit by the governor-general, Dame Cindy Kiro, at Government House, Wellington, on 19 September 2025

In the 2025 King's Birthday Honours, Drummond was appointed an Officer of the New Zealand Order of Merit, for services to dentistry and education.

== Selected works ==
- H K Anderson; Drummond, Bernadette Kathleen; Thomson, Murray William (2004). "Changes in aspects of children's oral-health-related quality of life following dental treatment under general anaesthesia". International Journal of Paediatric Dentistry. 14 (5): 317–325. doi:10.1111/j.1365-263x.2004.00572.x. PMID 15330997. Wikidata Q48583163.
- R A Farah; Swain, Michael V.; Drummond, Bernadette Kathleen; R Cook; Momen Atieh (2010). "Mineral density of hypomineralised enamel". Journal of Dentistry. 38 (1): 50–58. doi:10.1016/j.jdent.2009.09.002. PMID 19737596. Wikidata Q51794755.
- Burton, Jeremy Paul; Drummond, Bernadette Kathleen; Chris N Chilcott; John R Tagg; Thomson, Murray William; John D F Hale; Philip A Wescombe (2013). "Influence of the probiotic Streptococcus salivarius strain M18 on indices of dental health in children: a randomized double-blind, placebo-controlled trial". Journal of Medical Microbiology. 62 (Pt 6): 875–884. doi:10.1099/jmm.0.056663-0. PMID 23449874. Wikidata Q61955281.
- Rami A Farah; Brian C Monk; Swain, Michael V.; Drummond, Bernadette Kathleen (2010). "Protein content of molar-incisor hypomineralisation enamel". Journal of Dentistry. 38 (7): 591–596. doi:10.1016/j.jdent.2010.04.012. PMID 20447437. Wikidata Q43071789.
- Miller, Jody Carolyn; Grant, Andrea; Drummond, Bernadette Kathleen; Williams, Sheila M.; Taylor, Rachael; Goulding, Ailsa (2007). "DXA measurements confirm that parental perceptions of elevated adiposity in young children are poor". Obesity. 15 (1): 165–171. doi:10.1038/oby.2007.558. PMID 17228044. Wikidata Q79572508.
