= Nairn Wilson =

Scottish dentistry academic (born 1950)

Sir Nairn Hutchison Fulton Wilson CBE FRCS FRCSI (born 26 April 1950) is the Honorary Professor of Dentistry, former Professor of Restorative Dentistry and Dean and Head of King's College London Dental Institute (formerly Guy's, King's and St Thomas' Dental Institute, King's College London) from 2001 until 2012 and Deputy Vice Principal (health) between 2009 and 2012.

Wilson has received numerous awards for his contributions to dentistry.

== Education ==
Wilson was educated at Strathallan School in Perthshire, Scotland. He graduated from the University of Edinburgh (BDS) in 1973 and the University of Manchester (MSc) in 1979 and (PhD) in 1985. Wilson qualified from the Royal College of Surgeons of Edinburgh (FDS) in 1977 and (DRD) in 1980.

== Career ==
In 1974, Wilson was appointed a lecturer in restorative dentistry (prosthetics) at the University of Edinburgh. He then accepted the position of lecturer in conservative dentistry at the University of Manchester which he held from 1975 to 1981; becoming a senior lecturer from 1981 to 1986.

From 1982 to 2001, Wilson was Head of the Unit of Operative Dentistry and Endodontology (formerly of Conservative Dentistry) at the University Dental Hospital of Manchester.

In 1986, he was appointed Professor of Restorative Dentistry, a position he held until 2001. In the same year Wilson was made Head of the Department of Conservative Dentistry until 1988 and then appointed Head of the Department of Restorative Dentistry until 1992.

Between 1991 and 1992 he was Deputy Dean and then Dean and Clinical Director of the University of Manchester Dental Hospital from 1992 to 1995. He was also Pro-Vice-Chancellor from 1997 to 1999. In 2001 Wilson was appointed Professor of Restorative Dentistry and Dean and Head of King's College London Dental Institute whilst retaining the position of Honorary Visiting Professor of Restorative Dentistry at the University of Manchester from 2001 to 2004.

Wilson retired as Dean and Head of King's College London Dental Institute in 2012 and was appointed Honorary Professor of Dentistry. In 2011 Wilson was a visiting professor at the Osaka Dental University in Japan.

Throughout his career Wilson has held numerous senior executive and academic positions within dentistry. Between 1999 and 2003 he was President of the General Dental Council and the European Federation of Conservative Dentistry from 2003 to 2005. Wilson was also Co-chair of the Forum of European Heads and Deans of Dental Schools from 2007 to 2012. In 2015, he was inaugurated as the 129th President of the British Dental Association.

Wilson was Editor of the Journal of Dentistry from 1996 to 2000, and Quintessentials of Dental Practice, between 2003 and 2008. He was also Chairman of the Editorial Board for the Primary Dental Journal and the magazine Dental Practice. So far Wilson has published more than two hundred and fifty original research papers, two hundred abstracts, thirty five reviews and authored and edited fifty books as well as co-authoring twenty book chapters. Wilson has given more than four hundred and fifty invited lectures to organisations worldwide.

He was knighted in the 2023 Birthday Honours for services to dentistry.

== Honours and awards ==
- Fellow of Pierre Fauchard Academy (1990).
- Fellow of American College of Dentists (1990).
- Fellow of Academy of Dental Materials (1991), Emeritus Fellow (2012).
- Fellow of Royal College of Surgeons of England ad eundem (1994) Honorary (2010).
- Fellow of British Society for Restorative Dentistry (1996).
- Fellow of College of Dental Surgeons of Hong Kong (1999).
- The Royal College of Surgeons of Edinburgh College Medal (2000).
- Academy of Operative Dentistry George M Hollenback Memorial Prize (2002).
- Fellow of Faculty of General Dental Practitioners (UK) ad eundem (2002).
- Appointed a Commander of the Order of the British Empire (2004).
- Laurels, King's College London Students' Union (2005).
- Fellow of King's College London (2006).
- Fellow of The Higher Education Academy (2007).
- King's Award (2008) – Academic outreach and student recruitment.
- DSc honoris causa, University of Portsmouth (2010).
- Cultore Della Materia Odontostomatologiche (Visiting Professor), University of Brescia (2011).
- Tomes Medal and Life Membership, British Dental Association (2011).
- Fellow of Royal College of Surgeons in Ireland (2011).
- Fellow of Oman Dental College (2012).
- Outstanding Contribution to Dentistry, Dentistry Scotland Awards (2012).
- Dentistry Lifetime Achievement Award (2013).
- Award of Excellence of the Academy of Operative Dentistry European Section (2013).
