= Anders Fjellner =

Swedish Sámi priest and poet

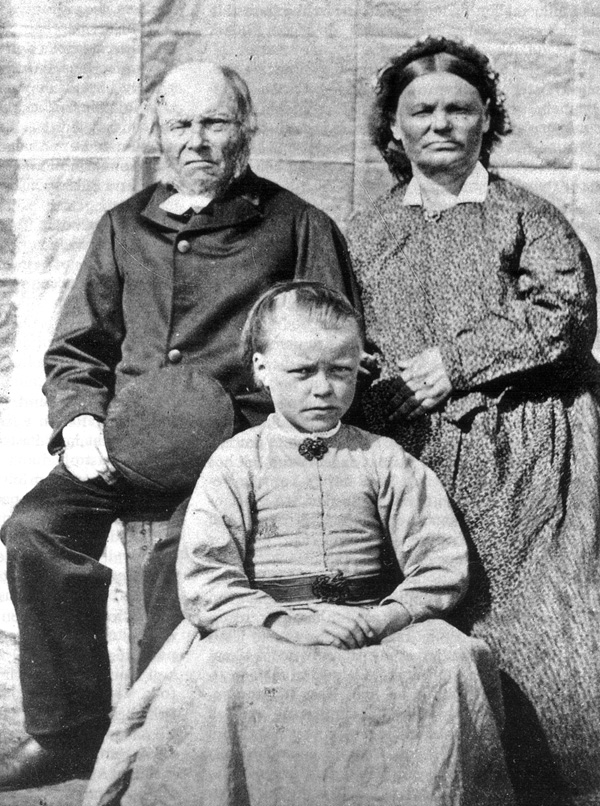
- Anders and Christina Fjellner photographed with their 15-year-old daughter Marta Eleonora in 1871. Photo by Lotten von Düben.
- Born: 18 September 1795; Rödfjället, Härjedalen, Sweden
- Died: 22 February 1876 (aged 80); Sorsele, Västerbotten, Sweden
- Occupations: priest, poet
- Notable work: Päiven Pārne'
- Spouse: Christina Päiviö (m. 1839)

Anders Fjellner (18 September 1795 – 22 February 1876) was a Sámi priest and poet known for his epic poem "Päiven Pārne'" ("Sons of the Sun") and his contributions to 19th Century ethnographic studies of Sámi people.

== Early life ==
Fjellner was born at Rödfjället, southwest of Tänndalen in Härjedalen, Sweden. His birth name was Anders Thomasson and his parents, Thomas Jonsson and Märta Andersdotter, were Sámi reindeer herders. After his father died in 1804, he was cared by for a relative who had him a trivial school in Frösön. It was during this time that he took the surname Fjellner. He later attended gymnasium in Härnösand before heading to Uppsala University in 1818. Throughout his studies, Fjellner returned to his home in the north to work in the reindeer industry.

Swedish policy at the time sought to assimilate Sámi people in part through the use of boarding schools, such as those attended by Fjellner, and by training these youths to become priests and missionaries. In 1821, Fjellner was posted as a missionary to Jukkasjärvi and Karesuando in Norrbotten province in the far north of Sweden. A native speaker of Southern Sámi, Fjellner had to learn Northern Sámi and Finnish to minister to the people in Jukkasjärvi and Karesuando.

He was finally ordained as a priest in 1828 in Härnösand. He returned to Norbotten to handle church affairs and serve as a preacher and by 1838 he was based in Karesuando. While in Karesuando, Fjellner often served as a court translator for Northern Sámi and Finnish speakers. In 1841, Fjellner and his family relocated to Sorsele, where he remained for the rest of his life. As Fjellner had vision problems and eventually went completely blind, he had long periods of help in Sorsele with an assistant pastor.

== Poetry ==
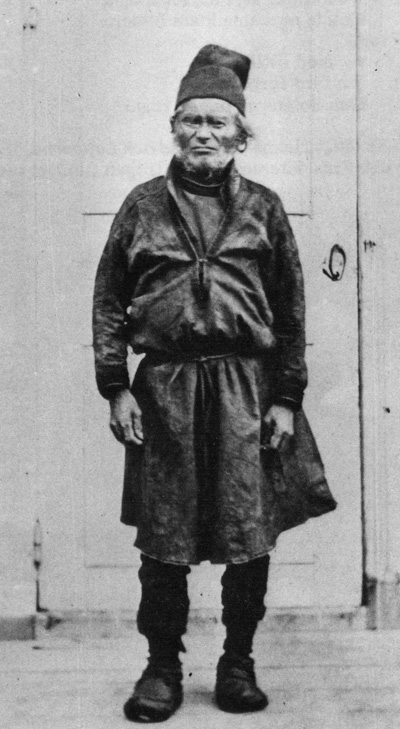
Anders Fjellner in traditional Sámi gákti in 1871. Photo by Lotten von Düben.

Throughout his life, as he moved around northern Sweden, Fjellner collected and preserved Sámi folktales, joik, and traditions, which became the root of much of his poetry, including the epics "Päiven Pārne'" (Sons of the Sun) and "Piššan Paššan Pardne" (Son of Pišša and Pašša) and two shorter poems, "Päive Neita" (The Daughter of the Sun) and "Kassa Muödda" (The Thick Fur). Most of these works were collected in a mix of Sámi languages and published originally in Swedish by folklorists Johan Anders Linder in 1849 and Gustaf von Düben in 1873 based on recitations by Fjellner. Photographer Lotten von Düben, Gustaf's wife, also photographed Fjellner in traditional Sámi clothing. In 1874, Finnish linguist Otto Donner visited Fjellner and recorded the poems in Sámi. By 1918, several translations of Fjellner's work had appeared in Swedish, German, English, Finnish, and Hungarian; a second wave of translations into Hungarian, English, and modern Sámi languages began in 1976.

=== Criticism ===
In 1906, linguist K.B. Wiklund published Lapparnes Sång og Poesi (The Lapps' Song and Poetry), which argued that Fjellner's epics were more original work than faithful renditions of Sámi oral tradition. Wiklund argued that the verse structure and alliterations used in "Päiven Pārne'" were heavily influenced by Finnish folk poetry.

In 1938, Sámi journalist Torkel Tomasson answered Wiklund's criticism by celebrating Fjellner for pulling together fragments of traditional stories to create a Sámi national epic. Tomasson said of Fjellner, “If he is not a Sámi Homer, then he is at least a Sámi Snorri Sturluson.

== Personal life ==
Fjellner married Christina Päiviö (Päivadtj in the church records) in 1839 in Karesuando. With their marriage, Fjellner acquired a small herd of reindeer. The couple went on to have seven children. Fjellner died in 1876 in Sorsele.
