= Paul Coulthard =

British Scientist and Dentist

Paul Coulthard (born November 1957) is a Professor of Oral & Maxillofacial Surgery, British Academic, Oral Surgeon and Scientist.

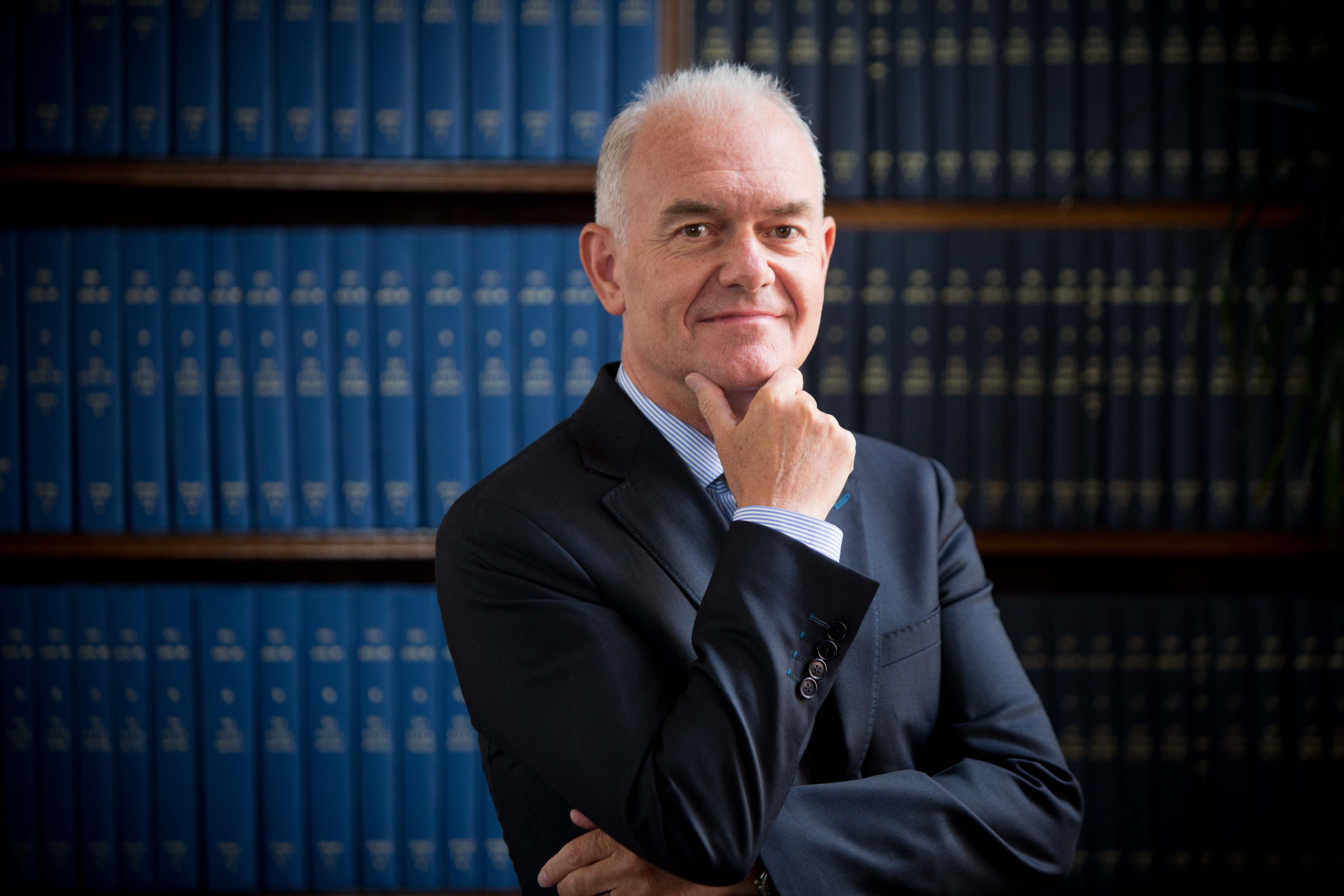
Paul Coulthard

== Education ==
Coulthard was educated at Danum Grammar School, Yorkshire. After undergraduate study at the University of Manchester he undertook General Clinical Training as a General Dental Practitioner in Manchester, Sheffield, and the Kingdom of Saudi Arabia. He then undertook Basic Surgical Training in Manchester, Carlisle and London, and also training in Anaesthesia. He completed his Higher Specialist Surgical Training in Academic Oral and Maxillofacial Surgery in Manchester in 2000. Alongside surgical training, Coulthard undertook research training leading to the award of an MDS in Oral and Maxillofacial Surgery and a PhD in Neuroscience.

== Career ==
Coulthard is Professor of Oral and Maxillofacial Surgery. He was appointed Dean of the School of Dentistry at the University of Manchester in 2013. In 2018 he was appointed Vice-Dean of the Faculty of Biology, Medicine and Health at the University of Manchester and Head of the School of Medical Sciences. This School consisted of the Research Institutes of 'Cancer Sciences', 'Cardiovascular Sciences', 'Developmental Biology & Medicine', 'Diabetes, Endocrinology & Gastroenterology', and the 'Manchester Medical School' and 'Manchester Dental School'. He was Consultant in Oral Surgery at the Manchester University Hospitals NHS Foundation Trust since 2001.

In 2019 Coulthard moved to Barts & The London School Faculty of Medicine and Dentistry, Queen Mary University of London, as Dean & Director of the Institute of Dentistry, and Professor of Oral & Maxillofacial Surgery. He was also appointed Honorary Consultant in Oral Surgery at Barts Health NHS Trust, one of the largest NHS Trusts in England.

Coulthard has chaired several committees for NHS England that has published reports changing the delivery of clinical care in England. Coulthard is Honorary Consultant Advisor to the Office of the Chief Dental Officer, NHS England and NHS Improvement (2020 to 2026).

Coulthard was President of British Association of Oral Surgeons. 2019-2021 and Immediate Past President 2021-2023.

Coulthard is co-owner with his daughter, Francesca Pearcey Coulthard, of Coulthard Sullivan Dental Practice in Wilmslow, Cheshire.

== Research ==
Coulthard has been an Editor with the Cochrane Oral Health Group since 2002, Editor-in-Chief of the international scientific journal Oral Surgery 2013-2018 and was a founding Editorial Board Member of the International Journal of Surgery 2002-2018. He has undertaken numerous clinical pain studies developed from his systematic reviews that have investigated intra-operative local analgesia and postoperative systemic analgesic strategies.

He designed, validated and introduced the Indicator of Sedation Need (IOSN) tool to support individual clinician decision making and determine population need for clinical service planning. This tool received international recognition and is adopted by the NHS, being used for over 500,000 patients in the UK. Coulthard contributed to the development of the 'Getting it Right First Time' (GIRFT) national programme launched by the NHS.

He was principal investigator for an international study investigating the benefits of tissue adhesive compared to traditional alternatives such as sutures for the skin closure of long surgical incisions. Moreover, Coulthard is leading research improving the response of healthcare professions to domestic abuse to those presenting with facial and dental injury. Coulthard has published over 200 scientific papers and managed a combined budget of over £185 million.

Coulthard has led and chaired several working groups for NHS England including Commissioning Dental Services - Conscious Sedation in a Primary Care Setting (2017), Greater Manchester Cluster Safe and Sustainable Programme (2012), Dental System Leadership Group and developed the Commissioning Guide for Oral Surgery, Oral Medicine and Supporting Specialties (Oral & Maxillofacial Pathology, Radiology and Microbiology).

He has been an expert adviser to the British National Formulary, NHS Direct, and The National Institute for Health and Care Excellence (NICE). He is professional member of the (NICE) Domestic Abuse Committee due to publish in 2027.

Coulthard together with British Dermatologist Irene Leigh created the 'Barts Centre for Squamous Cancer' in 2021 funded by Barts Charity. A centre of research excellence dedicated to improving the detection, treatment and quality of life for patients with squamous oral, oesophageal and skin cancer.

== Teaching ==
Coulthard through his role as Professor of Oral and Maxillofacial Surgery teaches undergraduate medical students, dental students and those from allied health professional courses. He supervises and teaches postgraduate students at Master's and PhD level.

Coulthard established Barts Digital - Transforming Oral Healthcare in 2022. This programme utilises virtual reality with Queen Mary University of London having the largest number of Haptic Dental Trainers in any school in the world.

The fourth edition of Coulthard's book Oral and Maxillofacial Surgery, Radiology, Pathology and Oral Medicine (Master Dentistry Volume 1), was published in 2022 (Paul Coulthard, Philip Sloan, Elizabeth Theaker, Anita Sengupta). Coulthard has authored 7 chapters in other textbooks.

Coulthard was an Advanced Life Support trainer for Resuscitation Council UK for over 10 years and taught advanced resuscitation and life support techniques to several surgical, medical and dental specialities.

The book, Artificial Intelligence in Facial Trauma and Systemic Health, by Pham, Holmes, Chatzopoulou and Coulthard was published in 2026 by Springer Nature.

== Humanitarian work ==
Coulthard secured the evacuation of a number of senior clinical academics and their immediate families whose lives were at risk from a global region of political instability. The sanctuary provided in the UK have enabled research capacity building whilst ensuring their safe refuge. Coulthard is the CARA (Council for At-Risk Academics) Academic Lead for Queen Mary University of London.

Coulthard is passionate about encouraging health professionals and their teams to support their patients presenting with Domestic Violence and Abuse (DVA). He was influential in highlighting the increased risk of DVA during the household isolation measures imposed to reduce coronavirus transmission during the COVID-19 pandemic. Coulthard works to influence national and international policy to improve DVA victims access to resources, raise awareness and provide training to medical doctors, dentists and the wider healthcare team to identify signs of DVA and standardise the referral pathway/management.

Coulthard is Founder and CEO of the social enterprise the Bloomsbury Trust, dedicated to promoting the response of healthcare professionals to facial injury. The focus of the organisation is reduction in facial injury and development of educational technologies and referral management systems to transform health and social progress through policy development.

== Global health ==
Whilst continuing his clinical and academic work, Coulthard has expanded his involvement in global health issues dedicating himself to improving healthcare around the world and reducing health inequalities in developed and low-to-middle income countries. Examples of such work include de-stigmatising HIV/AIDS in East Asia, raising awareness of domestic abuse in several European countries and Brazil, Kuwait, United Arab Emirates, Egypt, South Korea and China. In the UK, Coulthard worked with Baroness Helena Kennedy KC to highlight the role of dental professionals in identifying and reporting domestic abuse.

Following the start of the Russian invasion of Ukraine, Coulthard worked with a team to develop teaching material for Ukrainian surgeons whereby high-level teaching material and on-going surgical support was provided free of charge through Queen Mary University of London. He is founding section editor for Oral and Maxillofacial Trauma for the Ukrainian Journal of Diagnostics and Treatment of Oral and Maxillofacial Pathology.

Coulthard has delivered training courses in conscious sedation to medical and wider healthcare professionals for over two decades in the Middle East to improve patient safety and access to care.

Coulthard has been responsible for creating new clinical specialist training programmes delivering specialists for global patient need. He is working to accelerate the growth in specialist numbers. A larger global workforce is needed to meet the challenges brought about by COVID-19, as well as better prepare the world to prevent future pandemics. Coulthard is an invited contributor to the World Health Organisation Roadmap on Public Health and Emergency Workforce.

== Honours and awards ==
- International Union of Schools of Oral Health, UK Ambassador, Nippon Dental University, Japan,1996
- Diplôme D'Honneur, Anatomy of the Head and Neck, Lille 2 University Medical School, Lille, France, 2006.
- Visiting Professor of Oral and Maxillofacial Surgery, Henry M. Goldman School of Dental Medicine, Boston, 2016.
- President, British Dental Association Hospitals Group, 2015-18.
- Visiting Professor of Oral and Maxillofacial Surgery, Hong Kong University, 2017.
- Honorary Professor of Oral and Maxillofacial Surgery, Wuhan University, 2018. Officially opened first Centre for Evidence-Based Stomatology in China.
- Visiting Professor of Oral and Maxillofacial Surgery, University of Barcelona (Kingdom of Spain) Faculty of Medicine and Health Sciences, 2018.
- Honorary Professor of Oral and Maxillofacial Surgery, The University of Manchester, UK, 2019.
- FDSRCPS(Glas), Fellowship in Dental Surgery awarded for contribution of distinction to the specialty and dental profession, Royal College of Physician and Surgeons of Glasgow, 2019.
- FFDTRCS(Ed), Fellowship of the Faculty of Dental Trainers awarded for commitment to excellence in education and training, The Royal College of Surgeons of Edinburgh, 2020.
- FDSRCS(Ed), Fellowship in Dental Surgery awarded without examination in token of experience and qualifications, 2021.
- Visiting Professor of Oral and Maxillofacial Surgery, Airlangga University, Indonesia, 2022.
- Visiting Professor of Oral and Maxillofacial Surgery, The University of Jordan, 2023.
- FCGDent, Fellowship of the College of General Dentistry awarded by equivalence, 2023.

== Personal life ==
Coulthard was born in Bishop Auckland, County Durham. In 1993 he married Fiona MacDougall Pearcey with whom he has three children, Matthew Bromley, Francesca Pearcey and Imogen Darcey Coulthard.

Coulthard is co-owner with his daughter, Francesca Pearcey Coulthard, of Coulthard General & Specialist Dental Practice in Wilmslow, Cheshire.
