= Alice Timander =

Swedish dentist and celebrity (1915–2007)

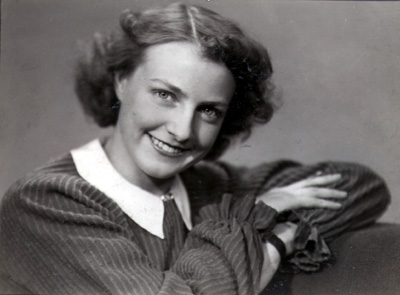
Alice Timander c. 1940

Alice Ingegärd Marianne Timander (6 October 1915 – 3 July 2007) was a Swedish dentist, but was better known as an entertainer and a Swedish red carpet queen at Stockholm theatre premieres.

== Biography ==
Alice Müller, daughter of Karl Albert Holger Müller and Inez Müller, was born in Stockholm, she grew up in Trelleborg and Eslöv. In 1937, at the age of twenty-one, Alice Timander was the youngest female dentist in Sweden. By that time, Timander had also attended some acting classes at a private institute named Koblancks teaterskola, but did not pursue her dream of becoming an actress. In 1942, she married the Swedish actor Bengt Logardt, with whom she had one child. The marriage let her appear as an extra in some plays and movies. In 1949, Timander was considered for expulsion from the Swedish Dental Association after appearing publicly in a bikini. In her first autobiography, Strunt i kläder, Timander writes that she defied the threat by wearing an even smaller bikini.

Together with her second husband, the well-known dentist Torsten Timander, she established volunteer dental practices in Morocco and Egypt. At that time, she had become a national celebrity and appeared in a 1960 revue starring Zarah Leander. In that capacity she later became known as a Swedish red carpet queen, appearing at notable theatre premieres. In her second autobiography Alice Timander, she describes the years as a red carpet queen by her own diagnosis "foyer exhibitionism".

Timander was also involved in social politics, advocating free dental care for homeless and elderly people. She billed herself as a politically active Social Democrat, but in 1988 turned to the small Christian Democratic Party to be involved in the party's general election campaign the same year. However, she announced her resignation from the party on the very election night, saying that the party had only taken advantage of her fame and ignored her social ideas of free dental care for the elderly.

In 2006, Swedish National Television produced a documentary of Timander named Alice och Jag. The film was nominated for the Guldbagge Award documentary class in 2007. During the final stages of the making of the documentary, Timander was diagnosed with a brain tumor. She died in Stockholm in 2007.

== Sources ==
- Alice Timander, Alice Timander, Stockholm : Norstedt, 1989, ISBN 91-1-884032-9
- Alice Timander, Strunt i kläder, Stockholm : Nordståhl & Backstroem, 1968.
- Premiärlejon utan högfärdsgener Svenska Dagbladet, 3 July 2007.
- Alice och Jag, documentary with Alice Timander, Rebecka Rasmusson, 2007.
