= Laestadius family =

Laestadius Læstadius Lestadius
- Family
- Current region: Northern Europe (mainly Sweden)
- Origin: Lästa, Ytterlännäs parish, Ångermanland
- Members: Lars Levi Laestadius
- Traditions: Laestadianism

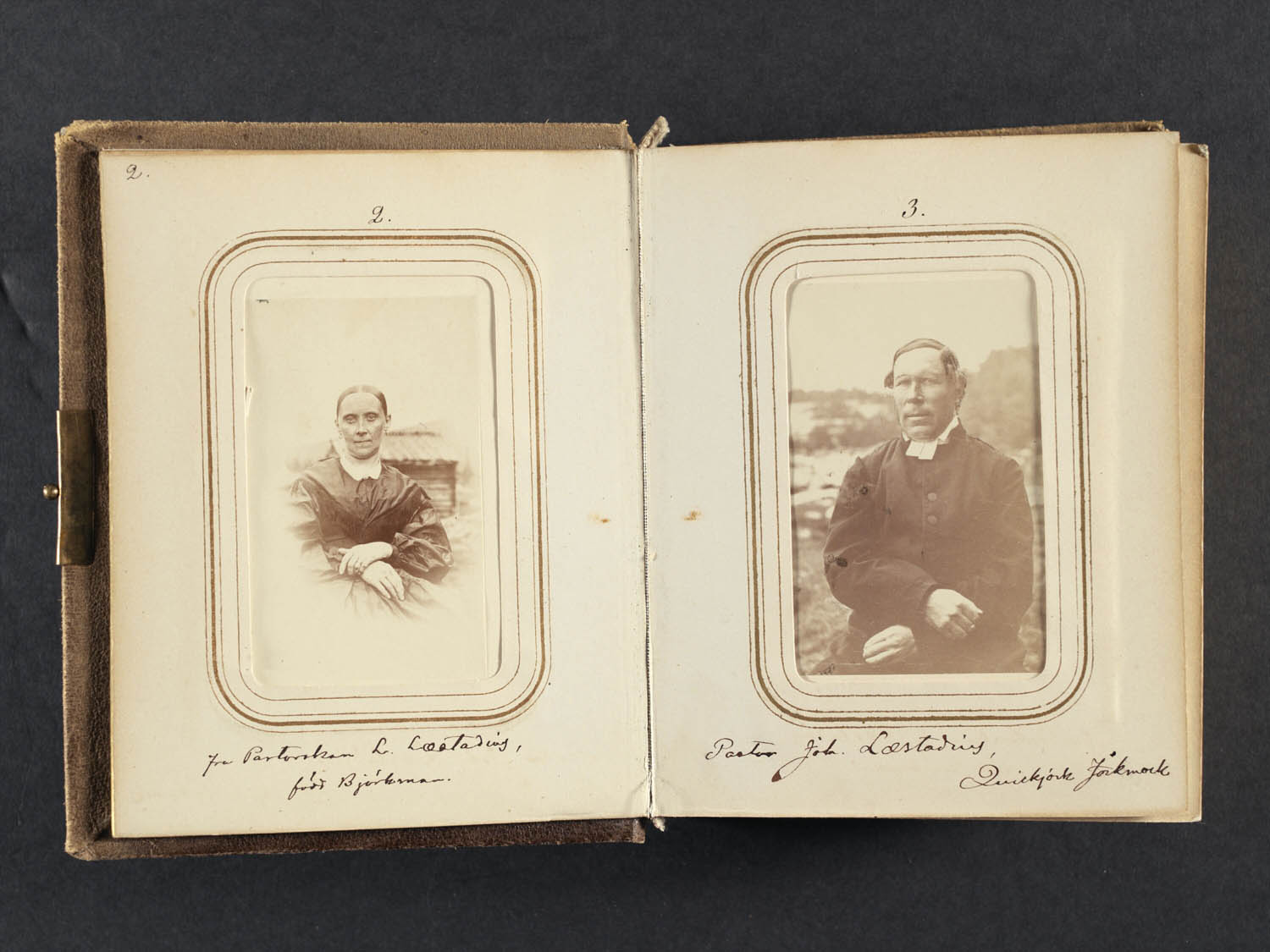
Johan Laestadius and his wife, photographed by Lotten von Düben

The Laestadius family (Swedish pronunciation: [lɛˈstɑ̌ːdɪɵs]) is a Swedish family originally from Ångermanland, and mostly noted for its member Lars Levi Laestadius, the founder of the pietistic Lutheran revival movement, Laestadianism.

== Notable members ==
- Lars Levi Laestadius (1800–1861), founder of Laestadianism
- Carl Erik Læstadius (1775–1818), priest
- Carl Fredrik Læstadius (1848–1927), priest
- Johan Læstadius (1815–1895), priest and scholar
- Petrus Læstadius (1802–1841), priest and author
- Lars-Levi Læstadius (1909–1982)
