= Margaret Seward (dentist) =

British dentist and public health official

Dame Margaret Seward DBE
- Dame Margaret Seward as President of General Dental Council
- Born: Felicity Bridget Oldershaw; August 5, 1935; Weymouth, Dorset
- Died: July 22, 2021 (aged 85); Bournemouth, Dorset
- Education: London Hospital Medical College
- Occupations: Dentist, Editor, Public Health Official
- Years active: 1959–2002 (approx.)
- Known for: First Female Chief Dental Officer
- Spouse: Gordon Seward
- Children: 2

Margaret Helen Elizabeth Seward, DBE (5 August 1935 – 22 July 2021) was a British dentist, editor, and public health official. She held several prominent positions in UK dentistry, including Chief Dental Officer for England, President of the General Dental Council, and President of the British Dental Association. She made contributions to dental education, professional regulation, and the advancement of women in the profession.

== Early life ==
Felicity Bridget Oldershaw was born on 5 August 1935 in Weymouth, Dorset. She was the youngest child of Dr. Eric Oldershaw, the town’s Medical Officer of Health, and Gwen Oldershaw, a qualified nurse and physiotherapist. Her father died in 1936 due to war-related health complications. As her mother struggled with mental health and financial difficulties, the three children were separated. Margaret was placed in an orphanage at around 15 months of age, while her brothers lived with relatives.

In 1937, at the age of two years and three months, she was adopted by John Hutton Mitchell, a dental surgeon, and his wife Marion Findlay Mitchell (née Duncan), a former schoolteacher. Her name was changed to Margaret Helen Elizabeth Mitchell, and she was raised in Enfield, North London. Her early experiences assisting with her adoptive father's dental practice, which operated from their home, as well as a fascination with mechanics and tools from a young age, sparked an interest in dentistry.

As her childhood took place during the Second World War, she experienced intensified bombing and rationing in London suburbs, while many children were evacuated to the country.

== Education ==
Seward initially attended Enfield Collegiate School until it was destroyed in a bombing raid in 1942. She then transferred to Palmers Green High School, a local independent girls’ school.

After failing to pass the eleven-plus examination on her first attempt due to illness, she joined Raglan Junior School in Edmonton, which offered a "scholarship class" for students preparing to retake the exam. After a year of study focused on essential subjects and practice papers, she passed and secured a place at The Latymer School in Edmonton in 1947. At Latymer, Seward studied subjects including physics, chemistry, botany, and zoology. She was elected Head Girl Prefect in her final year and participated in various school activities such as choir, drama productions, sports, and public speaking engagements. Elocution lessons received during her schooling were noted as valuable for her future public speaking roles.

She went on to study at the London Hospital Dental School, entering in 1954 after being offered a place following a successful interview. As part of the entry requirements, she retook her zoology A-level while attending lectures at Queen Mary College and the dental school. The dental school curriculum included anatomy, physiology, embryology, biochemistry, and comparative dental anatomy. At the time, she was one of only five women in her year. She demonstrated particular aptitude in prosthetic dentistry, earning the first distinction in the subject awarded to a woman at the London Hospital Dental School.

In 1959, she graduated with Honours in Prosthetic Dentistry. She later passed the Fellowship in Dental Surgery examination of the Royal College of Surgeons of England in 1962, becoming the first woman to achieve this. In 1969, she earned a Master of Dental Surgery degree from the University of London for her thesis on complications associated with the eruption of primary teeth, becoming the first woman to achieve this degree.

== Career ==
=== Early Clinical Practice and Postgraduate Training (1959–c.1975) ===
Margaret, aged 20

After graduating with Honours in Prosthetic Dentistry in 1959, Seward was appointed as the Resident Dental House Surgeon at the London Hospital, becoming the first woman to hold this position. The role involved working across emergency surgery, trauma care, operating theatres, and providing evening and weekend dental services. Her appointment was notable at the time, as previous holders of the role had been only men.

In 1962, she became the first woman to pass the Fellowship in Dental Surgery examination of the Royal College of Surgeons of England. She later held junior and middle-grade registrar positions in oral surgery and worked as the dental officer to the London Hospital's nursing staff.

From 1962, Seward also worked part-time outside the London Hospital, initially as a Senior Hospital Dental Officer at Highlands General Hospital in Winchmore Hill and subsequently as a community dental officer at a clinic in Cheshunt, Hertfordshire. These roles provided her with experience in treating children, including administering general anaesthesia, and conducting school dental inspections. It was during this period that she developed an interest in the role and training of dental auxiliaries, influenced by her observations of New Zealand school dental nurses.

In 1969, Seward earned a Master of Dental Surgery degree from the University of London for her thesis on complications associated with the eruption of primary teeth, again being the first woman to achieve this degree. This research involved collecting data from 275 mothers over nearly three years. She also initiated the production of a short film on teething based on her findings.

=== Emergence in Professional Bodies and Editorial Leadership (c.1975–c.1992) ===
From the mid-1970s, Seward became increasingly involved with professional dental organizations. She served as Secretary of the British Paediatric Society nationally from 1975 to 1979, having previously held the role for the south-east regional group.

In 1976, she was elected to the General Dental Council, becoming the first woman dentist elected to the statutory body. Her election marked her entry into dental regulation, and she began advocating for the interests of women dentists and other members of the dental team.

In 1979, Seward was appointed Editor of the British Dental Journal, a position she held until 1992, becoming the first woman editor. During her editorship, she oversaw a significant modernisation of the journal's format (changing to A4 size) and content, introducing new sections focusing on practice management and product news. She successfully sought sponsorship for journal initiatives, including postgraduate study days known as 'BDJ Teach-Ins', and initiated BDA Study Tours to various international locations.

Building on her earlier work, Seward continued her research and advocacy regarding women in dentistry during the 1980s. A survey conducted in 1985 provided updated data on the work patterns and career commitment of women dentists. She also worked to develop schemes like the Keeping in Touch scheme and the Retaining and Retraining Advisers to support women dentists returning to practice after career breaks. In 1985, she worked with Health Minister Edwina Currie to secure a Department of Health grant for a pilot program at the London Hospital to support women returning to practice. Her Keeping in Touch scheme encouraged skill retention.

Within the GDC, she served as Chairman of the Dental Auxiliaries Committee from 1983 to 1988 and was involved in establishing the Dental Technicians Education and Training Advisory Board in 1986.

Concurrently, from 1990 to 1998, she also served as Editor of the International Dental Journal, contributing to the modernisation of this publication.

=== Leading National Dental Organizations (1993–1999) ===
In 1993, Seward was elected President of the British Dental Association, serving a one-year term, the second woman to hold this position after Lilian Lindsay. Her presidency focused on engaging the entire dental team. She also held other leadership roles, including vice-dean of the English Faculty of Dental Surgery and president of the Odontological Section of the Royal Society of Medicine. Additionally, she served as chair of governors for The Latymer School from 1983 to 1994, during her time as governor, she was involved in significant school developments, including securing funding for science facilities and supporting changes to the school's governance and status (transition to grant-maintained status).

In 1994, Seward was elected President of the General Dental Council, serving until 1999, becoming the first woman to hold this position in 47 years. Her presidency was marked by significant efforts to modernise the GDC's governance, focusing on developing a Mission Statement and establishing Review Groups and a Specialist Training Advisory Committee. Key achievements included working towards the introduction of Specialist Lists and Titles for dentists and updating the ethical guidance in the GDC's 'Red Book'. She championed the successful effort to allow dentists to use the courtesy title 'Doctor', a decision approved after extensive debate on the Council. She also oversaw the development of updated guidance on general anaesthesia in dentistry, leading to changes aimed at improving patient safety. Further efforts focused on improving the GDC's premises and increasing public engagement through GDC Roadshows.

=== Chief Dental Officer for England (2000–2002) ===
In October 2000, Seward was appointed the first female Chief Dental Officer for England at the Department of Health, serving on a fixed-term contract until September 2002. Her role involved implementing the Government's dental strategy, aiming to improve access to NHS dentistry and modernise working practices. Her task was described by the press as fulfilling Tony Blair's vision for NHS dentists to be available to everyone who wants to use one.

In this role, she interacted closely with Ministers, including Lord Hunt of Kings Heath and Hazel Blears, advocating for the profession. She championed initiatives such as the Focus Awards recognising innovative practices, the 'Brushing for Life' programme aimed at improving oral health in young children, and promoting the Keeping in Touch Scheme to support dentists returning to practice. She also played a role in the dental workforce review and engaged with parliamentary select committees on dentistry-related issues. A notable event during her tenure was Lord Hunt's announcement of the Government's response to the York Review on water fluoridation in 2000.

== Honours ==
Dame Margaret Seward's Coat of Arms, designed by Patric Dickinson (officer of arms) in 2007 (Per fess indented Gules and Azure five seagulls volant to the sinister three and two Argent)

Badge of Dame Margaret Seward, designed by Patric Dickinson (officer of arms) in 2007, (A pair of quills saltirewise Or surmounted by a cross crosslet Azure)

Dame Margaret Seward was recognised for her contributions to dentistry with numerous awards, honorary degrees, and fellowships.

- 1990: Commander of the Order of the British Empire (CBE) – Awarded for her services to dentistry.
- 1999: Dame Commander of the Order of the British Empire (DBE) – First dental professional to receive this honour.
- Doctor of Science – Honorary degrees from the Universities of Sheffield, Portsmouth, and Plymouth. She was the first woman awarded an honorary Doctor of Science from the University of Portsmouth.
- Doctor of Dental Science – Honorary degree from Newcastle University.
- Doctor of Dental Surgery – Honorary degree from the University of Birmingham.
- Colyer Gold Medal – Conferred by the Royal College of Surgeons of England for outstanding contributions to dentistry.
- Fellow of Queen Mary and Westfield College – Recognised for her contributions to dental education and research.
- Fellowship in Dental Surgery – Awarded by the Royal Colleges of Edinburgh and Glasgow.
- Fellow of the Faculty of General Dental Practitioners – For her contributions to general dental practice.
- Fellow of the Faculty of Public Health Medicine – For her work in public health within dentistry.
- Fellow of the Faculty of Anaesthetists of the Royal College of Surgeons – For her contributions to dental anaesthesia standards.
- Honorary Member, American Dental Association – Recognised for her international influence in dentistry.
- Honorary Member, American College of Dentists – For her leadership and contributions to the profession.
- Honorary Member, American Dentistry International – Recognised for her work in international dentistry.
- Honorary Member, American Academy of the History of Dentistry – Recognised for her contributions to the history of dentistry.
- 2000: Slack Medal – Awarded by the London Hospital Medical College Dental School for outstanding contributions.

== Personal life ==
In 1962, Margaret married Gordon Seward, a senior lecturer in oral surgery who later became a professor and was appointed a CBE in 1990. The couple had two children. Margaret took a career break to raise her children, returning to work when they were aged five and three.

A lifelong member of the United Reformed Church, Margaret was involved with St Andrew’s United Reformed Church in Bournemouth after retiring to the area. She was secretary (chief elder), edited the church magazine, and led reflections at the weekly Pause for Prayer.

She published an autobiography, Open Wide: Memoir of a Dental Dame, in 2009.

== Death and legacy ==
Dame Margaret Seward died on 22 July 2021. Her funeral service was held on 9 August 2021 at Richmond Hill St Andrew’s United Reformed Church in Bournemouth, where she had been an active member.

Seward is primarily remembered for her impact on dental regulation and professional standards during her GDC presidency. Tributes following her death highlighted her role in modernizing the GDC and strengthening its focus on patient protection and the public interest. She was widely acknowledged as a "trailblazer", particularly for women in dentistry, and was recognized for her influence as an inspirational figure and mentor within the profession.

Her commitment to high standards in dental education and practice is a recurring theme in recollections of her career. Colleagues and professional bodies noted her integrity, wisdom, and ability to build consensus as key attributes that contributed to her influence.

In recognition of her contributions to The Latymer School, the institution named the Seward Studio in her honour. The studio was inaugurated in 2010 during the school’s centenary celebrations.
