= CPJ =

CPJ is used as an abbreviation for:

- Center for Public Justice, an independent organization for policy research and civic education based in Washington, D.C.
- Citizens for Public Justice, a nonprofit organization based in Canada
- The Cleft Palate-Craniofacial Journal, a medical journal and the official publication of the American Cleft Palate-Craniofacial Association
- Canadian Pharmacists Journal, formerly known as Canadian Pharmaceutical Journal, both abbreviated CPJ
- Committee to Protect Journalists, an independent nonprofit organization based in New York City, United States
- Communist Party of Jersey, a political party on the island of Jersey
- Conservative Party of Japan, a political party in Japan
- CPJ, the ICAO airline designator for Corpjet, United States
