= PGHS =

PGHS may refer to:

- Pacific Grove High School, Pacific Grove, California, United States
- Palmers Green High School, Palmers Green, London, United States
- Penns Grove High School, Carneys Point, New Jersey, United States
- Palmers Green High School, Pinetown, KwaZulu-Natal, South Africa
- Pleasant Grove High School (California), Elk Grove, California, United States
- Pleasant Grove High School (Utah), Pleasant Grove, Utah, United States
- Pottsgrove High School, Pottsgrove, Pennsylvania, United States
- Prairie Grove High School, Prairie Grove, Arkansas, United States
- Prince George High School, Prince George, Virginia, United States
- Providence Grove High School, North Carolina, United States
