= Magnus Huss =

Swedish doctor (1807–1890)

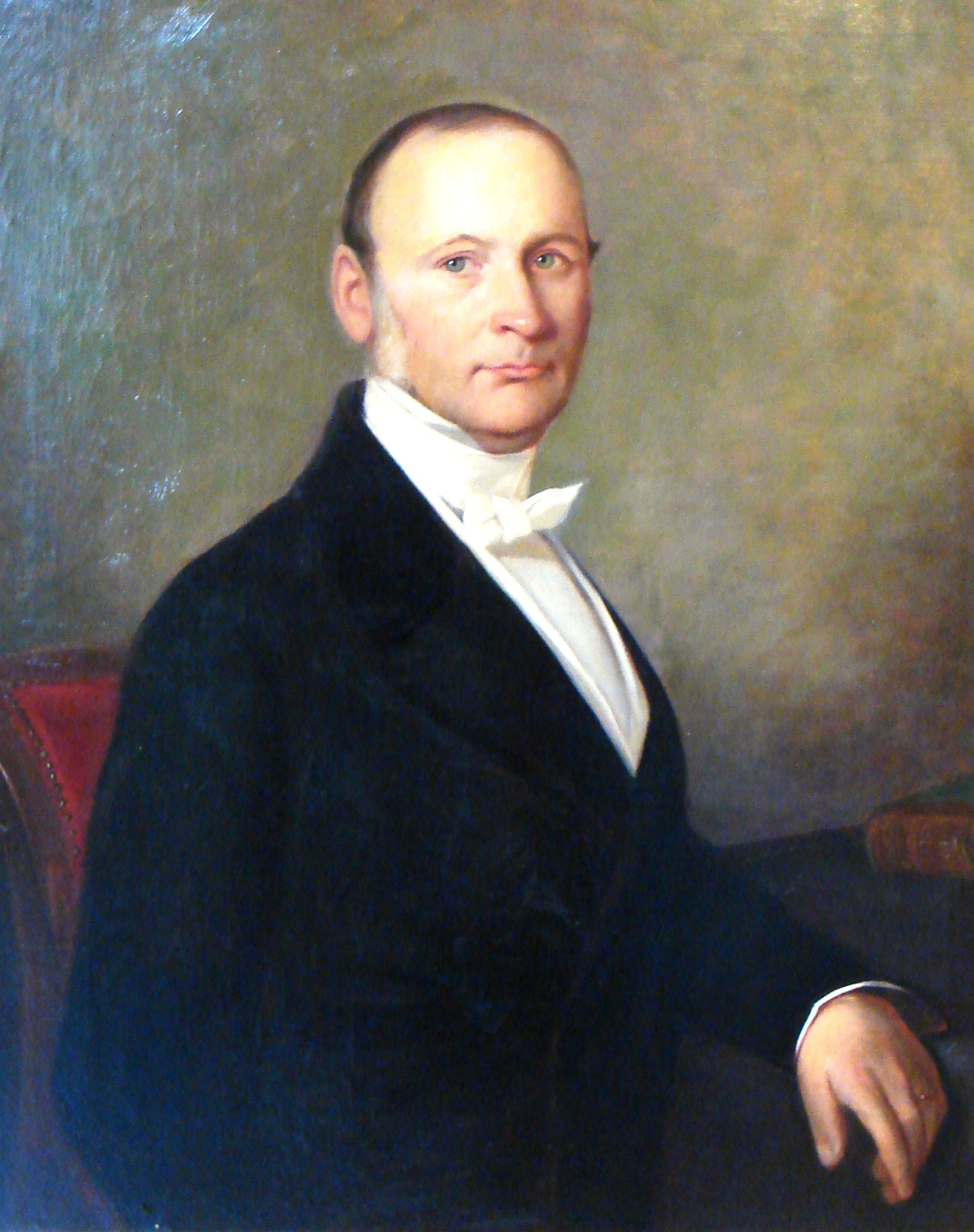
- Born: 22 October 1807; Torp, Medelpad, Sweden
- Died: 22 April 1890 (aged 82); Stockholm, Sweden
- Burial place: Norra begravningsplatsen
- Education: Uppsala University
- Occupations: Physician, professor
- Employer: Karolinska Institute
- Known for: Coining the term alcoholism

Magnus Huss (22 October 1807 – 22 April 1890) was a Swedish medical doctor and professor, knighted with his name retained. He is known for coining the term alcoholism in 1849, which he used to refer to the pathological changes in the body due to long-term alcohol intoxication. He has also been described the "forefather of Swedish internal medicine" and the "founder of clinical education in [Sweden]".

== Biography ==
=== Background, education, and career ===
Magnus Huss was born in Torp, Medelpad, Sweden. He was the son of vicar Johan Huss and Catharina Magdalena Hellzén. The family name was taken from his paternal great-grandmother, whose father was the uncle of Ericus Olai Huss.

Huss became a student in Uppsala in 1824, received his bachelor's degree in philosophy in 1829, master's in philosophy in 1830, bachelor's in medicine in 1832, licentiate degree in medicine in 1834, master's in surgery in 1835 and doctor of medicine the same year. The year before, Huss had already been appointed assistant physician at the Serafimerlasarettet in Stockholm and became assistant professor of medicine and surgery at the Karolinska Institute in 1835. After spending 1837–1838 in Germany, Austria and France for his scientific studies, he was appointed assistant chief physician at the Serafimerlasarettet in 1839 with the support of anatomist Anders Retzius and surgeon Carl Johan Ekströmer. On 1 August that year he opened the first real medical clinic in Sweden. At this clinic the methods of physical examination were introduced, including auscultation and percussion, in conjunction with a more careful study of pathological anatomy; and by the extraordinary ability and perseverance which Huss developed during his long service as director of the clinic, the above date may be said to form a turning point in the history of Swedish medicine.

In 1840, Huss was appointed senior physician at the Serafimerlasarettet and temporary professor, and in 1846 tenured professor at the Karolinska Institute. In 1860 he was appointed chairman of the Sundhetskollegium (later the National Swedish Board of Health) and general director of the hospitals, lazarettos and sanatoriums in the kingdom. While working there, he contributed to the founding of what became the Swedish Dental Association. He resigned from his position as chairman of the Board of Health in 1864, but remained general director of the hospitals until 1876. During his time as a teacher, Huss also engaged in extensive medical consultancy work.

=== Writing ===
Huss was also active as a scientific writer. In 1840 he published Summarisk öfversigt af sjukvården å k. Seraphimerlazarettets medico-cliniska afdelning, under de sista fem månaderna af år 1839 (A summary of the medical care in the medico-clinical department of the Serafimerlasarettet during the last five months of 1839). For the years 1840–1842 he also published such reports, which were continued in 1843 with Kliniska analekter (Clinical analects). In 1845 he published his Observations sur la fièvre typhoïde (Observations on typhoid fever). Huss gained his greatest scientific fame from the 1854 Montyon Prize awarded by the French Academy of Sciences for Alcoholismus chronicus eller chronisk alkoholssjukdom (Alcoholismus chronicus or chronic alcohol disease; two volumes, 1849–1851), in which the pathological changes in the body caused by chronic alcohol intoxication were first listed as a separate form of disease. His 1849 work also includes an early description of symptoms similar to restless legs syndrome, "more unpleasant than painful," "which usually are associated with the so-called restlessness, when the sick constantly tries to change the position of legs, especially when the evening comes or at night." Further mention may be made of his monographs Om typhus och typhoidfeberns statistiska förhållanden och behandling (On the statistical conditions and treatment of typhoid fever; 1855, translated into German, French and English) and Om lunginflammationens statistiska förhållanden och behandling (On the statistical conditions and treatment of pneumonia; 1860, German translation). For the benefit of the first of these works to American military physicians during the American Civil War, the United States Secretary of War expressed in an official letter his grateful appreciation. In addition to these works, Huss published in journals a number of major and minor papers, edited financial accounts of the Serafimerlasarettet from 1850 to 1860, and of Crown Princess Louise's Hospital for Sick Children (Kronprinsessan Lovisas vårdanstalt för sjuka barn) from 1852 to 1864, as well as Öfverstyrelsens öfver hospitalen underdåniga berättelser (the Head board's subordinate accounts of the hospitals) 1861–1876.

=== Description of alcoholism ===
Huss described alcoholism as follows in his 1849 work, Alcoholismus chronicus:

Alcoholism chronicus denotes the aggregate of those manifestations of disease of the nervous system, in its mental as well as its motor and sensory spheres, which, continuing in a chronic form, are not directly or mainly connected with any determinable lifetime condition, or after death to the unaided eye apparent changes in the composition of the central or peripheral parts of the nervous system, and which occur in those who have long, persistent and excessive consumption of alcoholic beverages.

=== Public health ===
The observation of chronic alcoholism led Huss to fight against drinking with all his conviction. Among his writings in this vein are Om bränvinsbegäret och bränvinssuperiet i Sverige (On the demand for brännvin and brännvin consumption in Sweden, 1853; reprinted from his work Om Sveriges endemiska sjukdomar, On Sweden's endemic diseases, 1852), Om bleksot och bränvinssuperi i Sverige (On anemia and brännvin consumption in Sweden, 1852) and Om dryckenskapen och dess följder för den enskilde, för familjen, för kommunen, för staten (On drinking and its consequences for the individual, for the family, for the municipality, for the state, 1882; sold 20,000 copies in the first seven months after its publication). His work played a large role in the passage of the 1855 law banning home distilling. His 1887 Varningsord mot bränvinsbruk och dryckenskap (Warning against the use of spirits and drinking) was to be posted in the classrooms of public schools and folk schools, according to a royal decree of 10 February 1888. In 1865, Huss published the popular work Om kaffe; dess bruk och missbruk (On coffee; its use and abuse).

At the same time he exercised great influence on a variety of other matters of a hygienic and philanthropic nature. Thus it was at his and Carl Peter Dahlgren's instigation that Crown Princess Louise's Hospital for Sick Children came into being. In association with professors Hjalmar August Abelin, Pehr Henrik Malmsten, and Carl Gustaf Santesson, Huss issued an invitation to apply for the establishment of the Stockholms sjukhem nursing home and then took steps to establish it and organize its first administration. He was also energetically active in the reorganization of the Allmänna Barnhuset in Stockholm, the establishment of children's nurseries and improved legislation concerning the care of the mentally ill. He took the initiative for Sweden's first children's nursery, Kungsholmens barnkrubba, inspired by similar establishments in Paris. Furthermore, he was chairman of the board of the Royal Seminary for female teachers and of the board of the Gymnastiska centralinstitut (today the Swedish School of Sport and Health Sciences), and member of several government-appointed committees.

=== Entrusted and honorary assignments ===
Huss was a member of the Royal Swedish Academy of Sciences (1844), member of the Royal Society of Arts and Sciences in Gothenburg (1846; honorary member 1859), member of the Royal Society of Sciences in Uppsala (1850; honorary member 1885) and of the Royal Physiographic Society in Lund (1878).

In 1857 he was raised to the rank of nobleman and served as a member of the knighthood and nobility in the Riksdag of the Estates of 1859–1860, 1862–1863 and 1865–1866. In 1866 he moved to Östergötland and in 1873–1874 he was a member of the second chamber of the Riksdag for the constituency of Åkerbo, Bankekind and Hanekind. From 1874 to 1883 he lived at Kvistrum in the parish of Gärdserum in northern Kalmar County, but returned to Stockholm in the latter year.

Excerpts from Huss's surviving manuscript were published in 1891 under the title Några skizzer och tidsbilder från min lefnad (Some sketches and moments from my life).

Magnus Huss väg is the name of a street in the Saint Göran Hospital area in Stockholm.

=== Nobility ===
Huss was knighted in 1857 with his name retained and was introduced in 1858 at the House of Nobility under number 2327.

=== Family ===
He married baroness Christina Maria Charlotta Bergenstråhle in 1857. Huss' only child, Helge Magnus Gabriel Huss (1859–1874), died before his father, upon which the family lineage died out. He was the nephew of Magnus Huss, known as Vildhussen.

Huss died in Stockholm in 1890 and is buried at Norra begravningsplatsen.
