= Sara Hurley =

British dentist (born 1966)

Sara Jane Hurley CBE (née Skinner; born 1966) is a British dentist who was the Chief Dental Officer (England) from 2015 to 2023.

Hurley qualified from the University of Bristol Dental School in 1988 with a BDS. She was commissioned into the Royal Army Dental Corps, and gained an MSc in Dental public health in 2004 from University College London. She went on to work at the Royal Centre for Defence Medicine, Birmingham, and was appointed Chief Dental Officer for the Army.

She was appointed by NHS England as Chief Dental Officer in August 2015.

In 2020, Hurley issued instructions to suspend and resume primary care dentistry in England during the COVID-19 pandemic.

As the Chief Dental Officer for England, Hurley provided updates to dental teams regarding NHS contractual changes, which included the implementation of a minimum indicative UDA value of £23, updates to support enhanced UDAs for higher needs patients, and personalization of recall intervals. She urged staff to receive influenza vaccinations to protect both themselves and their patients. Moreover, Hurley emphasized the importance of implementing skill mix in the dental profession, to encourage the use of dental therapists and other dental care professionals.

Hurley stepped down from the Chief Dental Officer role in June 2023. She was appointed Commander of the Order of the British Empire (CBE) in the 2025 Birthday Honours, for services to dentistry.

Government offices
Preceded by Barry Cockcroft	Chief Dental Officer for England; August 2015 – June 2023	Succeeded by Jason Wong
