= Gustaf von Düben =

Swedish physician (1822–1892)

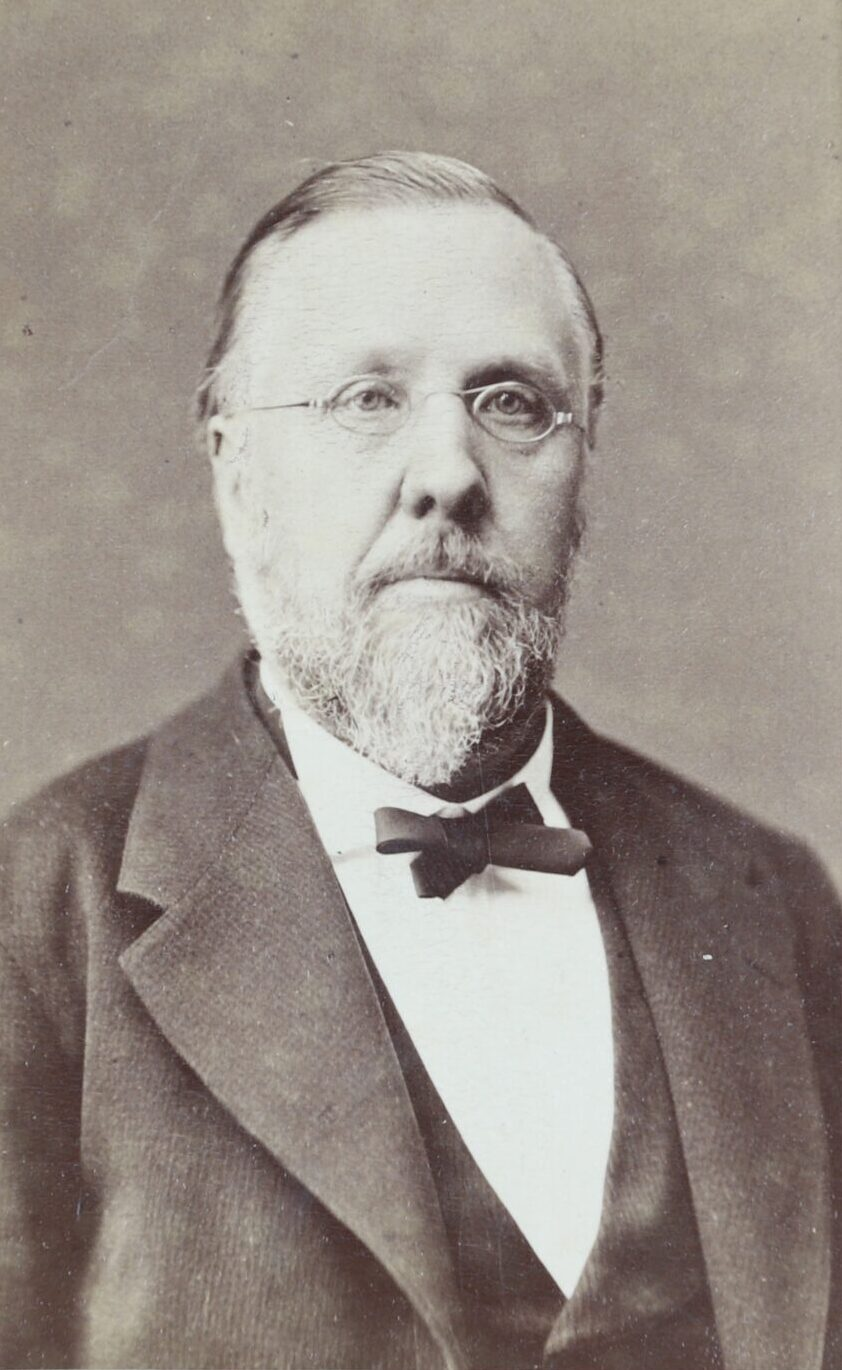

Inspector of the Karolinska Institute
- In office 1860–1871
- Preceding: Magnus Huss
- Preceded by: Sten Stenberg

Personal details
- Born: May 25, 1822 Sweden
- Died: July 14, 1892 (aged 70) Vårdinge, Sweden
- Spouse: Lotten von Bahr
- Relations: Düben family
- Parent: Gustaf Henrik von Düben
- Education: Lund University
- Occupation: Physician

Gustaf Johan Wilhelm von Düben (May 25, 1822 – July 14, 1892) was a Swedish physician.

== Early life ==
Gustaf von Düben was born in Södermanland to Gustaf Henrik von Düben.

== Career ==
In 1859, Düben performed a landmark postmortem examination that provided the first "full clinicopathological description of a myocardial infarction". The report, presented alongside Malmsten, remained largely unknown internationally for decades, though a German translation by Warburg appeared in 1930.

Düben served as the inspector of the Karolinska Institute from 1860 to 1871, while also holding a professorship in anatomy and physiology.

In 1868, Gustaf von Düben, began to compile a catalogue of Sámi skulls. It was illustrated with photographs taken by his spouse, Lotten von Bahr, who was a pioneering documentary photographer.

Gustaf von Düben is primarily remembered for his major work on the Sámi people, Om Lappland och lapparne, företrädesvis de svenske, which was published in 1873. His interest in the Sámi people was sparked when, as a professor at the Karolinska Institute, he came into contact with the large collection of Sámi skulls kept in the institute's anatomical museum.

== Personal life ==
Gustaf von Düben was the last member of the now-dissolved branch of the Düben family, which descended from Gustaf Düben (1659–1726) (No. 135). This is a different noble branch from the one that still survives (No. 139), which is also officially introduced (or registered/listed) at the House of Nobility in Stockholm.

Düben's wife, Lotten, was the daughter of Robert von Bahr and Eva Carolina Åkerhielm af Margretelund.

Academic offices
Preceded by Magnus Huss	Inspector of the Karolinska Institute; 1860–1871	Succeeded by Sten Stenberg
