= College of General Dentistry =

Un-chartered college of dentistry in the UK

The College of General Dentistry is a professional body based in the United Kingdom operating since 2021. It provides a professional home for the whole dental team working in primary dental care and wider oral health services.

The college publishes the Primary Dental Journal.

== Purpose ==
The College is a membership organisation and professional body, open to all Registered members of the dental team (Dentists, Dental Hygienists, Dental Therapists, Dental Technicians, Clinical Dental Technicians, Orthodontic Therapists and Dental Nurses), and initially comprised members of the former Faculty of General Dental Practice (FGDP(UK)).

The College sets clinical and other standards for dental practice, provides career pathways and provides a community of professional practice. Its aims are to foster public confidence and high standards in oral healthcare.

== Formation ==
The College was activated on 1 July 2021 upon the transfer of the membership and the standard-setting role of the former Faculty of General Dental Practice (UK) from the Royal College of Surgeons. The College realises the long-held ambition of many in the profession for an independent collegiate body, of comparable standing to the healthcare-related Royal Colleges.

Following the decision to transfer by the Board of FGDP(UK), Prof Sir Nairn Wilson was invited to lead the development of the College.

== Standards & Guidance ==
The College publishes a number of standard-setting documents, which are widely recognised in the UK and internationally as providing an authoritative, consensus reference on good clinical practice in dentistry.

Standards & guidance publications of the College of General Dentistry (previously FGDP(UK)
Title	Edition	Date
An introduction to research for primary dental care clinicians	1	2010
Antimicrobial prescribing in dentistry	3	2020
Clinical examination & record-keeping	3	2016
Dementia-friendly dentistry	1	2017
Guidance notes for dental practitioners on the safe use of X-ray equipment	2	2020
Implications of COVID-19 for the safe management of general dental practice	1	2020
Mentoring in implant dentistry	1	2022
Selection criteria for dental radiography	3	2018
Standards in Dentistry	3	2025
Training standards in implant dentistry	1	2016

== Constitution ==
The College is a Charity registered in England & Wales (Charity No.1002769). It is governed by an appointed Board of Trustees which delegates professional leadership to an elected Council.

== Arms ==
Coat of arms of College of General Dentistry
Notes Granted 4 March 2025. Crest A demi-Opinicus wings elevated and addorsed Azure armed Or resting the dexter paw on a pearl Proper. Escutcheon Azure a pelican in her piety Or the blood Gules on a chief Or three serpents nowed Azure. Motto Sanitate Oris Venit Fortitudo Badge An Opinicus rampant wings elevated and addorsed Azure armed Or holding between the forepaws a pearl Proper.
