= Raman Bedi =

British dental admisnitrator

Raman Bedi is an English dentist. He is currently a professor of transcultural oral health at King's College London. He was the Chief Dental Officer of England from 2002 to 2005.

== Career ==
From 1996 to 2002, Bedi was foundational chair in transcultural oral health at the Eastman Dental Institute, University College London and directed a centre at the Institute. From 1998 to 2008, he was the co-director of the World Health Organization Collaborating Centre at the institute.

From 1 October 2002 to 1 October 2005, he was the Chief Dental Officer of England. While Chief Dental Officer, he contributed to the passage of the Health and Social Care Act (dental clauses) 2004, Water Act (Fluoridation) 2004 and the Section 60 (2005) order reforming the General Dental Council.

In September 2005, he chaired the UK European Union Presidency dental programme.

Bedi is currently Professor of Transcultural Oral Health at King's College London and holds an honorary chair at University College London. He also has an honorary "extraordinary professorship" in paediatric dentistry at the University of the Western Cape, South Africa (2007–2010), and is chair of the I.T.S. Centre for Dental Studies & Research and Maulana Azad Institute of Dental Sciences in India.

Bedi is director of the Global Child Dental Health Taskforce. The taskforce supports governments in their efforts to improve children's oral health. As of 2010, the taskforce was working in 13 countries. Bedi also chairs of the Global Child Dental Fund, a charity established to further the work of the Taskforce.

He was President of the British Society for Disability and Oral Health (2002), President of the Education Research Group of the International Association for Dental Research (IADR) (2002–2004) and chair of the IADR Regional Development Programme Committee (2002–2004).

== Awards ==
In 2003 Bedi received the Asian Guild award and, in 2004, the Asian Jewel award. In 2005 he was awarded the USA Public Health service medal.

Government offices
Preceded by Margaret Seward	Chief Dental Officer for England; October 2002 - September 2005	Succeeded by Barry Cockcroft
