= Barry Cockcroft (dentist) =

Barry Michael Cockcroft CBE was the Chief Dental Officer (CDO) for England.

== Early life ==
Cockcroft qualified from the Dental School at the University of Birmingham in 1973.

== Career ==
Cockcroft was a dentist working in Rugby in general practice for 27 years, during which time he represented dentists locally on the Warwickshire Local Dental Committee (LDC), and nationally, after he was elected to the General Dental Services Committee (GDSC) in 1990. He was appointed Deputy CDO in November 2002, and he became the acting CDO on 1 October 2005, before he took up the CDO post in July 2006.

He was appointed Commander of the Order of the British Empire (CBE) in the 2010 New Year Honours. While Chief Dental Officer for England, Cockcroft launched the "if in doubt, get checked out" Mouth Cancer Awareness Week campaign in November 2006.

In 2015, after leaving the post at the Department of Health, Cockcroft became a non-executive director at UK Corporate dental provider MyDentist (Formally Integrated Dental Holdings), one of the largest providers of NHS and private dentistry in the country.

Cockcroft was "instrumental" in developing two new dentistry schools in the United Kingdom, the Peninsula Dental School and the dental school at the University of Central Lancashire.

After Steve Bedser stood down from the role, Cockcroft became interim chair of the British Fluoridation Society having previously been elected to its executive body. Cockroft now continues to serve as chair of the society. As chair of the society, Cockcroft promotes the public health benefits of water fluoridation and supports dentists in sharing this information with their patients. Cockcroft has commented that "fluoride really helps us close this gap between those that are less well off and those from more affluent backgrounds".

== Personal life ==
Cockcroft is married and has three children.

He appeared on the 2012 Christmas special of the BBC's University Challenge.

Government offices
Preceded by Raman Bedi	Chief Dental Officer for England; October 2005 – February 2015	Succeeded by Sara Hurley
