= Flora Robson =

English actress (1902–1984)

Dame Flora Robson DBE
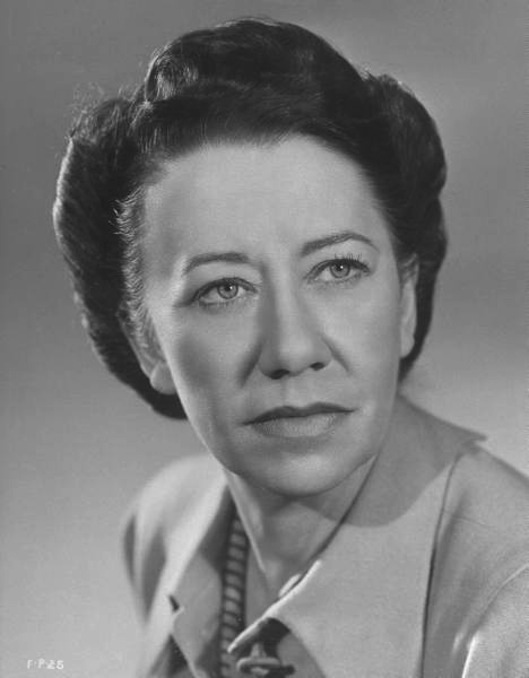
- Robson in a 1940s studio publicity shot
- Born: Flora McKenzie Robson; 28 March 1902; South Shields, County Durham, England
- Died: 7 July 1984 (aged 82); Brighton, East Sussex, England
- Education: Royal Academy of Dramatic Art
- Occupation: Actress
- Years active: 1921–1984

Dame Flora McKenzie Robson (28 March 1902 – 7 July 1984) was an English actress and star of the theatrical stage and cinema, particularly renowned for her performances in plays demanding dramatic and emotional intensity. Her range extended from queens to murderers.

== Early life ==
Flora McKenzie Robson was born on 28 March 1902 in South Shields, County Durham, daughter of David Robson (1864–1947) and Eliza Robson (née McKenzie; 1870–1953) both of Scottish descent. She had six siblings. Many of her forebears were engineers, mostly in shipping. Her father was a ship's engineer who moved from Wallsend near Newcastle to Palmers Green in 1907 and Southgate in 1910, both in north London, and later to Welwyn Garden City.

She was educated at the Palmers Green High School and the Royal Academy of Dramatic Art, where she won a bronze medal in 1921.

== Career ==
Her father discovered that Flora had a talent for recitation and, from the age of five, she was taken around by horse and carriage to recite, and to compete in recitations. This established a pattern that remained with her.

Robson made her stage debut in 1921. She struggled to find a footing in the theatre after she graduated from RADA with a bronze medal since she lacked the conventional good looks which were then an absolute requisite for actresses in dramatic roles. After touring in minor parts with Ben Greet's Shakespeare company she may have played small parts for two seasons in the new repertory company at Oxford, but her contract was not renewed. She was told that they required a prettier actress. Unable to secure any acting engagements, she gave up the stage at the age of 23, and she took up work as a welfare officer in the Nabisco shredded wheat factory in Welwyn Garden City. Tyrone Guthrie, due to direct a season at the new Festival Theatre, Cambridge, asked her to join his company. Her performance as the stepdaughter in Pirandello's Six Characters in Search of an Author made her the theatrical talk of Cambridge. She followed with Isabella in Measure for Measure with Robert Donat, Pirandello's Naked, the title role in Iphigenia in Tauris, Varya in The Cherry Orchard, and Rebecca West in Henrik Ibsen's Rosmersholm.

In 1931, she was cast as the adulterous Abbie in Eugene O'Neill's Desire Under the Elms. Her brief, shocking appearance as the doomed prostitute in James Bridie's play The Anatomist put her firmly on the road to success. "If you are not moved by this girl's performance, then you are immovable" the Observer critic wrote. This success would lead to her famous 1933 season as leading lady at the Old Vic.

After the Second World War, demonstrating her range, she appeared in Holiday Camp (1947), the first of a series of films which featured the very ordinary Huggett family; as Sister Philippa in Black Narcissus (1947); as a magistrate in Good-Time Girl (1948); as a prospective Labour MP in Frieda (1947); and in the costume melodrama Saraband for Dead Lovers (1948). Her other film roles included the Empress Dowager Cixi in 55 Days at Peking (1963), Miss Milchrest in Murder at the Gallop (1963), the Queen of Hearts in Alice's Adventures in Wonderland (1972), and Livia in the aborted I, Claudius in 1937.

She continued her acting career late into life, though not on the West End stage, from which she retired at the age of 67, often for American television films, including a lavish production of A Tale of Two Cities (in which she played Miss Pross). She also performed for British television, including The Shrimp and the Anemone. In the 1960s, she continued to act in the West End, in Ring Round the Moon, The Importance of Being Earnest and Three Sisters, among others.

She continued to act on film and television. She was last briefly seen as a Stygian Witch in the fantasy adventure Clash of the Titans in 1981. Both the BBC and ITV made special programmes to celebrate her 80th birthday in 1982, and the BBC ran a short season of her best films.

== Awards and honours ==
She was nominated for an Academy Award for Best Supporting Actress as Angelique Buiton, a Haitian maid, in Saratoga Trunk (1945).

She was created a Commander of the Order of the British Empire (CBE) in the 1952 New Year Honours, and raised to Dame Commander (DBE) in the 1960 Birthday Honours. She was also the first famous name to become president of the Brighton Little Theatre. She has a road named after her in her birthplace of South Shields.

On 4 July 1958, she received an honorary DLitt from Durham University at a congregation in Durham Castle.

== Personal life and death ==
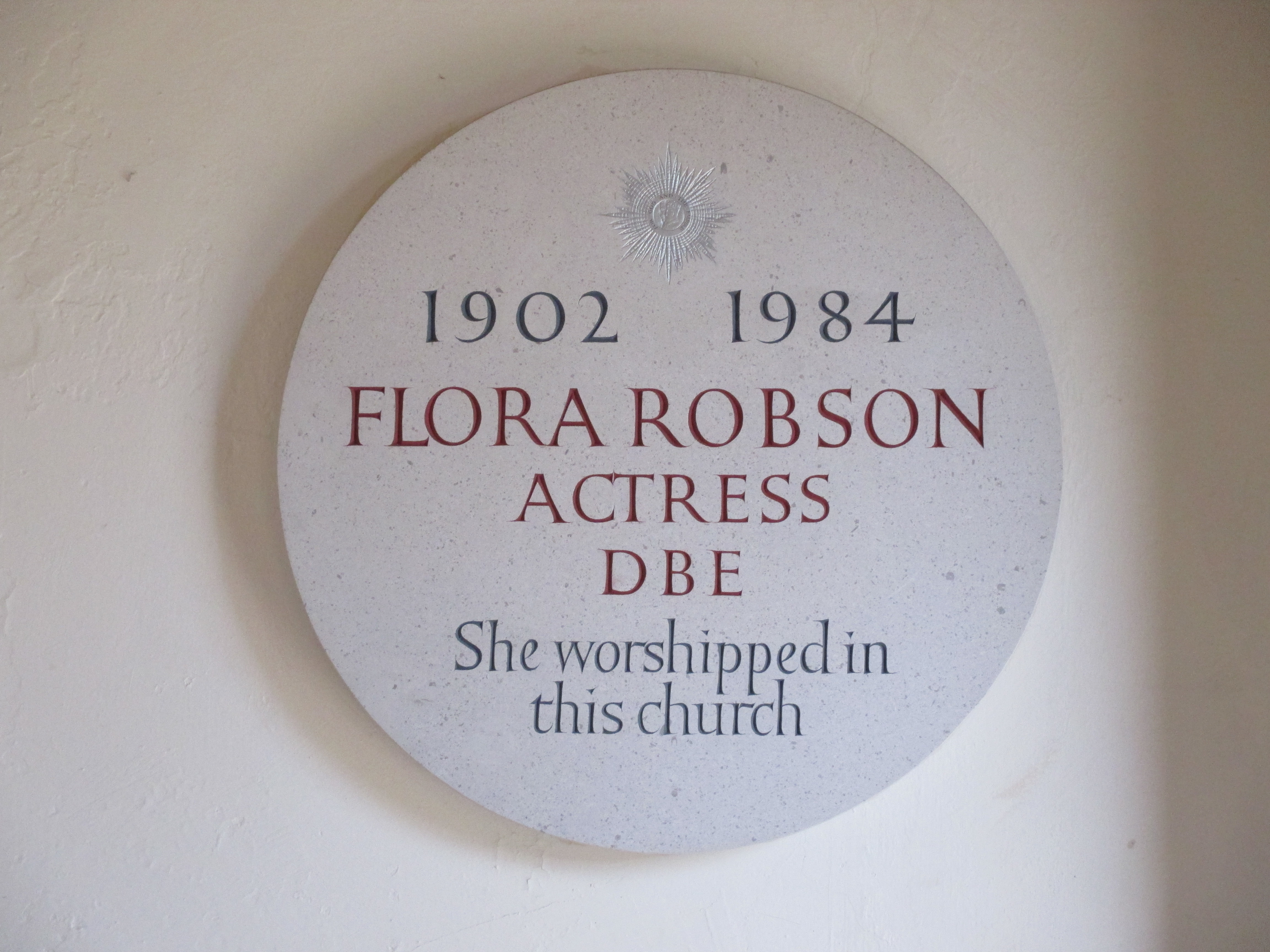
Memorial tablet to Flora Robson in the porch of her final parish church, St Nicholas, Brighton

Her private life was largely focused on her large family of sisters Margaret and Shela, and her nephews and nieces.

She shared a home in Wykeham Terrace, Brighton with her sisters for 8 years before she died in Brighton, aged 82, in her sleep, of cancer. She was never married and had no children. The sisters died around the same time: Shela shortly before Flora, in 1984, and Margaret on 1 February 1985.

== Legacies ==
Dame Flora Robson Avenue, built in 1962, in Simonside, South Shields, is named after her. There is a plaque on the house in Wykeham Terrace, Dyke Road, Brighton, and also one in the doorway of St Nicholas's Church, of which Flora Robson was a great supporter.

There is also a plaque to commemorate the opening of the Prince Charles Cinema (Leicester Square, London) by Flora Robson.

In 1996, the British Film Institute erected a plaque at number 14 Marine Gardens, location of Flora Robson's other home in Brighton, where she lived from 1961 to 1976.

A plaque at 40 Handside Lane in Welwyn Garden City records Flora Robson living there from 1923 to 1925.

A blue plaque sponsored by Southgate District Civic Trust and Robson's former school Palmers Green High School was unveiled at her family home from 1910 to 1921, The Lawe, 65, The Mall, Southgate, on 25 April 2010.

Robson attended the opening of the Flora Robson Playhouse in Jesmond, Newcastle upon Tyne, in 1962, which was named in her honour. The building was demolished in 1971 and the theatre company it housed relocated to the new University Theatre.

== Filmography ==
Year	Title	Role	Note
1931	A Gentleman of Paris		Uncredited
1932	Dance Pretty Lady	Mrs. Raeburn	
1933	One Precious Year	Julia Skene	
1934	The Rise of Catherine the Great	Empress Elisabeth	
1934	The Private Life of Don Juan	Undetermined Role	(scenes deleted)
1937	Fire Over England	Queen Elizabeth I of England	
1937	Farewell Again	Lucy Blair	
1937	I, Claudius	Livia	Also in The Epic that Never Was
1939	Wuthering Heights	Ellen Dean	
1939	Smith	Mary Smith	Short
1939	Poison Pen	Mary Rider	
1939	We Are Not Alone	Jessica Newcome	
1939	Invisible Stripes	Mrs. Taylor	
1940	The Sea Hawk	Queen Elizabeth I	
1941	Bahama Passage	Mrs. Ainsworth	
1944	Two Thousand Women	Miss Manningford	
1945	Great Day	Mrs. Liz Ellis	
1945	Saratoga Trunk	Angelique Buiton	Nominated - Academy Award for Best Supporting Actress
1945	Caesar and Cleopatra	Ftatateeta	
1945	Dumb Dora Discovers Tobacco		Short
1946	The Years Between	Nanny	
1947	Black Narcissus	Sister Philippa	
1947	Frieda	Nell	
1947	Holiday Camp	Esther Harman	
1948	Good-Time Girl	Miss Thorpe	
1948	Saraband for Dead Lovers	Countess Platen	
1952	The Tall Headlines	Mary Rackham	
1953	Malta Story	Melita Gonzar	
1954	Romeo and Juliet	Nurse	
1957	High Tide at Noon	Donna MacKenzie	
1957	No Time for Tears	Sister Birch	
1958	The Gypsy and the Gentleman	Mrs. Haggard	
1958	Innocent Sinners	Olivia Chesney	
1959	This Is the BBC		
1963	55 Days at Peking	Dowager Empress Tzu-Hsi	
1963	Murder at the Gallop	Miss Milchrest	
1964	Guns at Batasi	Miss Barker-Wise	
1965	Young Cassidy	Mrs. Cassidy	
1965	Those Magnificent Men in Their Flying Machines	Mother Superior	
1966	7 Women	Miss Binns	
1966	Eye of the Devil	Countess Estell	
1967	The Shuttered Room	Aunt Agatha	
1967	Cry in the Wind	Anasthasia	
1970	Fragment of Fear	Lucy Dawson	
1971	La grande scrofa nera	La Nonna	
1971	The Beast in the Cellar	Joyce Ballantyne	
1971	The Beloved	Antigone	
1972	Alice's Adventures in Wonderland	Queen of Hearts	
1975	The Canterville Ghost	Mrs. Umney	TV movie
1978	Les Misérables	The Prioress	TV movie
1980	Dominique	Mrs. Davis	
1980	Gauguin the Savage	Sister Allandre	TV movie
1980	A Tale of Two Cities	Miss Pross	TV movie
1981	Clash of the Titans	A Stygian Witch	final film role

== Partial television credits ==
Year	Series or miniseries	Role	Note
1956	BBC Sunday-Night Theatre	Lilly Mofat/Sister Agatha	2 episodes
1959	World Theatre	Anna Fierling	1 episode
1964	The Human Jungle	Headmistress	1 episode
1966	David Copperfield	Betsey Trotwood	8 episodes
1968	BBC Play of the Month	May Beringer	1 episode
1974	Heidi	Grandmother	Miniseries, 4 episodes
1975	A Legacy	Narrator	5 episodes
1979	A Man Called Intrepid	Sister Luke	3 episodes

== Theatre performances ==
- Queen Margaret in Will Shakespeare at the Shaftesbury Theatre, London, 1921
- Shakespearean repertory with Ben Greet's company, 1922
- JB Fagan's company at the Oxford Playhouse, 1923
- Two seasons at the Festival Theatre, Cambridge, 1929–30
- Abbey Putnam in Desire Under the Elms at the Gate Theatre, London, 1931
- Herodias in Salome at the Gate Theatre, London, 1931
- Mary Paterson in The Anatomist at the Westminster Theatre, London, 1931
- Stepdaughter in Six Characters in Search of an Author at the Westminster Theatre, London, 1932
- Bianca in Othello at the St. James' Theatre, London, 1932
- Olwen Peel in Dangerous Corner at the Lyric Theatre, London, 1932
- Eva in For Services Rendered at the Globe Theatre, London, 1932
- Ella Downey in All God's Chillun Got Wings at the Embassy Theatre, Swiss Cottage, 1933
- A season at the Old Vic, London, 1933–34
- Mary Read in Mary Read at His Majesty's Theatre, London 1934
- Lady Catherine Brooke in Autumn at the St. Martin's Theatre, London, 1937
- Ellen Creed in Ladies in Retirement at the Henry Miller's Theatre, New York, 1940
- Sarah, Duchess of Malborough in Anne of England at the St. James Theatre, New York, 1941
- Rhoda Meldrum in The Damask Cheek at the Playhouse Theatre, New York, 1942–43
- Thérèse Raquin in Guilty at the Lyric, Hammersmith, 1944
- Agnes Isit in A Man About the House at the Piccadilly Theatre, 1946
- Lady Macbeth in Macbeth at the National Theatre, New York, 1948
- Lady Cicely Waynflete in Captain Brassbound's Conversion at the Lyric, Hammersmith, 1948
- Christine in Black Chiffon, at the Westminster Theatre, 1949 and the 48th Street Theatre, New York, 1950
- Lady Catherine Brooke in Autumn at the Q Theatre, London, 1951
- Paulina in The Winter's Tale at the Phoenix Theatre, London, 1951
- The Return at the Duchess Theatre, London, 1953–54
- Janet in The House by the Lake at the Duke of York's Theatre, London, 1956
- Mrs Alving in Ghosts at the Old Vic, 1958–59 and the Prince's Theatre, London, 1959
- Miss Tina in The Aspern Papers at the Queen's Theatre, London, 1959 and on tour to South Africa, 1960
- Grace Rovarte in Time and Yellow Roses at the St. Martin's Theatre, London, 1961
- Miss Moffatt in The Corn is Green at the Connaught Theatre, Worthing, the Flora Robson Playhouse, Newcastle upon Tyne and on tour to South Africa, 1962
- Gunhild in John Gabriel Borkman at the Duchess Theatre, London, 1963
- Lady Bracknell in The Importance of Being Earnest at the Flora Robson Playhouse, Newcastle upon Tyne, 1964
- Hecuba in The Trojan Women at the Edinburgh Festival, 1966
- Miss Prism in The Importance of Being Earnest at the Theatre Royal Haymarket, London, 1968
- Mother in Ring Round the Moon at the Theatre Royal Haymarket, London, 1968
- Agatha Payne in The Old Ladies at the Westminster Theatre and the Duchess Theatre, London, 1969
- Elizabeth I in Elizabeth Tudor, Queen of England at the Edinburgh Festival, 1970

== Sound recordings ==
Robson can heard as Agatha in the Caedmon Records production of T.S. Eliot's The Family Reunion, as the Countess of Roussillion in Caedmon's All's Well That Ends Well, and in an anthology of spoken poetry..
