= Chief Dental Officers (United Kingdom) =

The Chief Dental Officers (or CDOs) in the United Kingdom are the most senior advisers for dentistry in each of the four UK governments, and are the heads of the dental profession. The CDO is one of the six chief professional officers, one for each of six professions, to give advice in their respective speciality.

== List of Chief Dental Officers for England ==
- William G Senior, 1956–1961
- William Holgate, 1961–1971
- George D Gibb, 1972–1984
- Professor Martin Downer, 1984–1990
- Brian Mouatt, 1990–1996
- Robin Wild, 1997–2000
- Margaret Seward, 2000–2002
- Professor Raman Bedi, 2002–2005
- Barry Cockcroft, 2005–2015 (acting until 2006)
- Sara Hurley, 2015–2023
- Jason Wong, 2023–present (interim until April 2024)

== List of Chief Dental Officers for Scotland ==
- Thomas HJ Douglas, 1956–1959
- James W Galloway, 1959–1971
- Dr James L Trainer, 1971–1979
- Dr Martin C Downer, 1979–1983
- Norman K Colquhoun, 1984–1993
- J Robin Wild, 1993–1997
- T Ray Watkins, 1997–2007
- M Margie Taylor, 2007–2018
- Tom Ferris, 2018–2025
- Gillian Leslie, 2026–present

== List of Chief Dental Officers for Wales ==
- William G Senior, 1956–1961
- William Holgate, 1961–1971
- George D Gibb, 1972–1984
- Dighton R Edwards, 1984–1985
- David M Heap, 1986–1996
- Dr Paul Langmaid, 1996–2010
- Dr David Thomas, 2010–2016
- Dr Colette Bridgman, 2016–2021
- Andrew Dickenson, 2022–present

== List of Chief Dental Officers for Northern Ireland ==
- William G Senior, 1956–1961
- William Holgate, 1961–1971
- George D Gibb, 1972–1984
- James F Mageean, 1984–1990
- William J N Collins, 1990–1998
- Doreen Wilson, 1998–2006
- Donncha O'Carolan, 2006–2013
- Simon C Reid, 2013–2020
- Michael Donaldson, 2020–2021 (acting)
- Caroline Lappin, 2021–present

== See also ==
- Chief Medical Officers (United Kingdom)
