= Journal of Dental Biomechanics =

- Discipline: Dentistry, materials science
- Language: English
- Edited by: Christoph Bourauel, Theodore Eliades

Publication details
- History: 2009-2015
- Publisher: SAGE Publications

Standard abbreviations
- ISO 4: J. Dent. Biomech.

Indexing
- ISSN: 1758-7360
- OCLC no.: 555920034

Links
- Journal homepage; Online access; Online archive

The Journal of Dental Biomechanics is a peer-reviewed academic journal that covers in the field of materials science applied to dentistry. The editors-in-chief are Christoph Bourauel (University of Bonn) and Theodore Eliades (University of Zurich). It was established in 2009 and published by SAGE Publications. The journal has stopped publications since 2015.

== Abstracting and indexing ==
The Journal of Dental Biomechanics is abstracted and indexed in:

- Biotechnology Research Abstracts
- Calcium and Calcified Tissue Abstracts
- PubMed
