= International Association of Paediatric Dentistry =

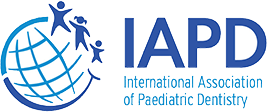
- Logo of the IAPD, updated 2020
- Formation: June 1969; 57 years ago
- Founded at: Siena, Tuscany, Italy
- Type: Nonprofit
- Website: https://iapdworld.org

International Association of Paediatric Dentistry (IAPD) is a non-profit organization founded in 1969. The objective of IAPD is to contribute to the promotion of oral health for children around the world.

It is an international forum for certified pediatric dentists and general dental practitioners for treating children.

The IAPD has now 70 National Member Societies, represents over 20,000 dentists.

== Council and voting ==
The IAPD council comprises one voting delegate per national member society, with the option to appoint one alternate delegate who can attend council meetings and vote in the absence of the primary delegate. All voting delegates must hold current membership. Meetings are held at least once every two years during an international congress hosted by one of the council's members in their locale.

Over the last decade, meetings were held in: 2023 Netherlands, 2021 online, 2019 Cancún, 2017 Santiago, 2015 Glasgow, 2013 Seoul, 2011 Athens, 2009 Munich. with future meetings taking place in 2025 South Africa, and 2027 Osaka

The board of directors includes international representation and a two-year appointment. For example, the board members for 2021-2023 are from Peru (President), Brazil (Immediate Past President), Turkey (President Elect), Israel (Secretary General), USA (Editor), and South Africa, India and South Korea (Representatives for National Member Societies).

The ten IAPD standing committees include:

- Executive Committee
- Education Committee
- Finance Committee
- Congress Site Selection and Coordination Committee
- Constitution Review Committee
- Membership Committee
- Awards Committee
- Nominations Committee
- Public Relations Committee
- Science Committee

== Activities ==
In addition to the international council meetings, the association hosts regional meetings, educational workshops, e-learning programs, and outreach programs. Dentists for All Children (DENFAC) was launched in 2001 to provide dental student educators with lectures and clinical teaching sessions. Programs for Africa and Asia include Teach the Teachers Educational Workshop.

The IAPD promotes member events, as well as those from other related organizations including The Italian Society of Pediatric Dentistry, The Paedodontic Society of South Africa, The FDI World Dental Congress, The Association Argentina de Odontología para Niños (AAON), and The Hellenic Society of Pediatric Dentistry.

The IAPD promotes global dialogue with regard to pediatric dentistry. In 2019, in a global effort to define children's early childhood carries, the Bangkok declaration was accepted.

IAPD publications include a yearly newsletter and the International Journal of Pediatric Dentistry, published six times a year. Its website includes events, online training videos, and e-learning opportunities.

== Membership ==
The IAPD differentiates between member nations and individuals. In addition, there are national member societies, individual members, honorary members, senior members, IAPD-supported members, post‐graduate student members and affiliate members. The IAPD's goal is for membership to be inclusive of all societies and individuals and members are encouraged to attend congresses.
