= Brazilian Dental Journal =

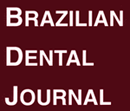
- Discipline: Dentistry
- Language: English
- Edited by: Jesus Djalma Pécora, Paulo Cesar Saquy, Manoel Damião de Sousa Neto

Publication details
- History: 1990–present
- Publisher: Fundação Odontológica de Ribeirão Preto (Brazil)
- Frequency: Bimonthly

Standard abbreviations
- ISO 4: Braz. Dent. J.

Indexing
- ISSN: 0103-6440 (print); 1806-4760 (web)
- OCLC no.: 163422487

Links
- Journal homepage; Online access; Online archive (1990–2006)

The Brazilian Dental Journal is a bimonthly peer-reviewed medical journal covering all aspects of dentistry. It is abstracted and indexed in MEDLINE/PubMed. The publication of this journal is financially supported by the Fundação Odontológica de Ribeirão Preto da Faculdade de Odontologia de Ribeirão Preto da Universidade de São Paulo, the Programa de Apoio a Publicações Científicas do Conselho Nacional de Desenvolvimento Científico e Tecnológico,> the Ministério da Ciência e Tecnologia (MCT), Financiadora de Estudos e Projetos, and the Fundação de Amparo à Pesquisa do Estado de São Paulo. The editors-in-chief are Jesus Djalma Pécora, Paulo Cesar Saquy, and Manoel Damião de Sousa Neto.
