= Community Dentistry and Oral Epidemiology =

- Discipline: Dental public health
- Language: English
- Edited by: Professor Sarah R Baker

Publication details
- History: 1973–present
- Publisher: John Wiley & Sons
- Frequency: Bimonthly
- Open access: Hybrid
- Impact factor: 2.9 (2026)

Standard abbreviations
- ISO 4: Community Dent. Oral Epidemiol.

Indexing
- CODEN: CDOEAP
- ISSN: 0301-5661 (print); 1600-0528 (web)
- OCLC no.: 1072348489

Links
- Journal homepage; Online access; Online archive

Community Dentistry and Oral Epidemiology is a bimonthly peer-reviewed medical journal covering dental public health and the application of epidemiology to dentistry. It was established in 1973 and is published by John Wiley & Sons. The editor-in-chief is Professor Sarah R Baker (University of Lincoln, UK). According to the Journal Citation Reports, the journal has a 2026 impact factor of 2.9 in the category "Dentistry, Oral Surgery & Medicine"
