= Seminars in Orthodontics =

Medical journal

- Discipline: Orthodontics
- Language: English
- Edited by: Elliott M. Moskowitz

Publication details
- History: 1995–present
- Publisher: Elsevier
- Frequency: Quarterly
- Impact factor: 0.500 (2017)

Standard abbreviations
- ISO 4: Semin. Orthod.

Indexing
- ISSN: 1073-8746
- OCLC no.: 796162169

Links
- Journal homepage; Online access; Online archive

Seminars in Orthodontics is a quarterly peer-reviewed medical journal publishing review articles in the field of orthodontics. It was established in 1995 and is published by Elsevier. Its first guest editor was Robert J. Isaacson (Virginia Commonwealth University), and its current editor-in-chief is Elliott M. Moskowitz. According to the Journal Citation Reports, the journal has a 2017 impact factor of 0.500.
