= Seychelles Medical and Dental Association =

Seychelles Medical and Dental Association (SMDA) is a registered body consisting of the doctors and dentists working in the Republic of Seychelles. Unlike the Seychelles Medical and Dental Council which has been formed by a law, the Medical Practitioners and Dentists Act, 1994, and which regulates the medical and dental profession, the Seychelles Medical and Dental Association focuses more on the career and socio-professional interests of doctors and dentists in Seychelles. In reality, it is a trade union for the doctors and dentists. Any doctor or dentist in Seychelles can become a member upon payment of the prescribed membership fees.

== Background ==
Since its formation, around 1993, the Seychelles Medical and Dental Association has been at the forefront of all negotiations with the Government to improve the working and living conditions of doctors and dentists in Seychelles. One of its former Chairman, Dr Patrick Herminie, became Speaker of the National Assembly of Seychelles.

The Seychelles Medical and Dental Association owns the Seychelles Medical and Dental Journal. Although the Journal has not been published for several years now, previous editions have featured seminal articles on ground-breaking research in Seychelles. Efforts are underway to revive the journal.
