= Seychelles Medical and Dental Council =

- SMDC LOGO
- Abbreviation: SMDC
- Formation: 1994; 32 years ago
- Founder: Medical Practitioners and Dentists Act
- Purpose: Regulatory
- Location: Seychelles
- Chair: Bernard Valentin

The Seychelles Medical and Dental Council (SMDC) was created in 1994 by the Medical Practitioners and Dentists Act. Its function is regulatory.

The logo of SMDC depicts the coco de mer, (the largest nut in the world and found only in Seychelles), cut in cross-section and sitting on part of the leaf of the coco de mer tree. It also depicts a unique and loose interpretation of the Rod or the Staff of Asclepius the symbol of healing. The two snakes around the staff bear some resemblance to the Caduceus but they are not meant to depict the Caduceus. One of the snakes is deliberately of a different blue colour. SMDC regulates both the medical and dental professions and the two slightly different and yet similar snakes around the staff are meant to represent these two professions of healing.

The main mandate of the Council is to register medical practitioners and dentists before they are able to start work in Seychelles as a doctor or dentist. Any practicing doctor or dentist in Seychelles who does not feature on the register of the Seychelles Medical and Dental Council is practicing medicine or dentistry illegally. The list of registered Medical Practitioners and Dentists who are duly registered by the Council and are therefore able to practise legally, is published in the Official Gazette or Government gazette of Seychelles at the beginning of each year. The law dictates that this list must be published before 15 February of each year.

The Seychelles Medical and Dental Council is also mandated to receive complaints from members of the public about the professional conduct or competence of medical practitioners and dentists and to investigate these complaints in a fair manner.

The SMDC is additionally tasked with coordinating and facilitating the continuing professional development of all medical practitioners and dentists working in Seychelles.

The current Chairman of the Seychelles Medical and Dental Council is Dr. Bernard Valentin. He was elected Chairman in November 2013 and his mandate will last until November 2015. The current governing board of the Seychelles Medical and Dental Council consists of twelve members, appointed by the Minister for Health.

The minister appoints members of the board according to precise criteria prescribed by the Medical Practitioners and Dentists Act. Slots are reserved on the council for the representative of the Seychelles Medical and Dental Association, and any other professional association that regroups a sufficient number of doctors and/or dentists. The doctors and dentists elect one doctor and one dentist to represent them on the council.

The offices of the Seychelles Medical and Dental Council are currently located in the Red Roof Building of Seychelles Hospital, just opposite the Accident and Emergency Unit. The council's office is staffed by a registrar or assistant registrar.

== The medical and dental professions in Seychelles ==
Seychelles is renowned for its 100% primary health care coverage and for its high turnover of doctors and dentists. Of the roughly 150 doctors and dentists actively practicing in Seychelles, either in government health facilities or private facilities, about 60% are foreign-born. Non-naturalized foreign-born doctors spend an average of two years in Seychelles before they are repatriated to their countries of origin.

Most foreign doctors currently come from Cuba, India, China, Sri Lanka (for government health facilities) and Germany for Silhouette Island where there is a special arrangement with a medical company, the hotel on that island and the company managing that island, to provide doctors to the island. A large number of these doctors have been registered by the Seychelles Medical and Dental Council.

== Training of doctors and dentists ==
Seychelles now has a new university, called the University of Seychelles. However, that university does not have a medical school. Seychellois doctors and dentists continue to be trained overseas in almost every corner of the World. Over the past thirty years, local doctors and dentists in Seychelles have been trained in United Kingdom, France, Germany, Greece, Cuba, Russia, New Zealand, Zimbabwe, South Africa, Kenya, Tanzania, Czech Republic, Slovakia, Yugoslavia, Malaysia, India and other countries.

== See also ==
- Seychelles Medical and Dental Association
