= Swedish Dental Society =

Logo.

The Swedish Dental Society (Swedish: Svenska Tandläkare-Sällskapet) is a Swedish odontological and dental organization.

It was founded on 21 November 1860 and got its current name in 1881. Although originally a learned society, since December 1984, it has been a foundation with more emphasis on financially supporting dental research. It also provides for post-college dental education and arranges conferences.

The current chair is professor Per Vult von Steyern.

== See also ==
- Swedish Dental Association
