= Palmers Green High School =

Location
- 104 Hoppers Road; Palmers Green; London, N21 3LJ; England; 51.6261°N 0.1042°W

Information
- Type: Private day school
- Motto: By Love Serve One Another
- Religious affiliation: Quaker
- Established: 1905
- Founder: Alice Hum
- Local authority: Enfield
- Department for Education URN: 102061 Tables
- Head teacher: Sarah Proudlove
- Gender: Girls
- Age: 3 to 16
- Enrolment: 320~
- Colours: Blue (Navy), Pink
- Website: www.pghs.co.uk

Palmers Green High School was a private girls' day school located in Hoppers Road, Palmers Green, North London. It consisted of three divisions: Preparatory (Reception-Year 2), Junior School (Years 3-6) and the Senior School (Year 7-11). It didn't have a sixth form.

== History ==
The school was founded by Alice Hum, who belonged to the Society of Friends, on 8 May 1905 in 1 Osborne Road, Palmers Green with twelve pupils, eight of whom were in the Kindergarten. In 1907, it expanded by taking the adjoining house on Green Lanes. After a third house was taken, the boy pupils were moved to Avondale Hall, which had been used as a school for girls from 1909-1910.

In 1918, by which time it had 300 pupils and the Boys' School had been phased out, it moved to its current site, Avondale Hall, in Hoppers Road. It has since been extended on that site.

After the outbreak of the Second World War, it continued to provide full-time education and temporarily shared its site with its co-foundation Keble School.

On 19 January 2026, the Board of Governors announced its intention to close the school at the end of the academic year, citing unsustainable finances caused by falling enrollment.

== Admissions ==
Palmers Green was a selective school and the selection process included assessment, which was in the form of an examination for the senior school, and an interview. A documentary film with the title Modern Times: Testing Times was produced in 1997, showing how some families approached this selection process.

== Academics ==
Palmers Green was one of Enfield's top performing independent schools.

=== Curriculum ===
Pupils could've choose from the following options of GCSE choices:

- History
- Geography
- French
- Art
- Drama
- Spanish
- ICT
- Music

This was in addition to compulsory subjects; English Language, English Literature, Mathematics, Dual Science Award and a Modern Foreign Language.

== Notable former pupils ==
- Stevie Smith, poet and novelist
- Dame Flora Robson, actress
- Kathryn Prescott, actress
- Megan Prescott, actress
- Margaret Seward, First Female Chief Dental Officer
