= Lotten von Düben =

Swedish photographer (1828–1915)

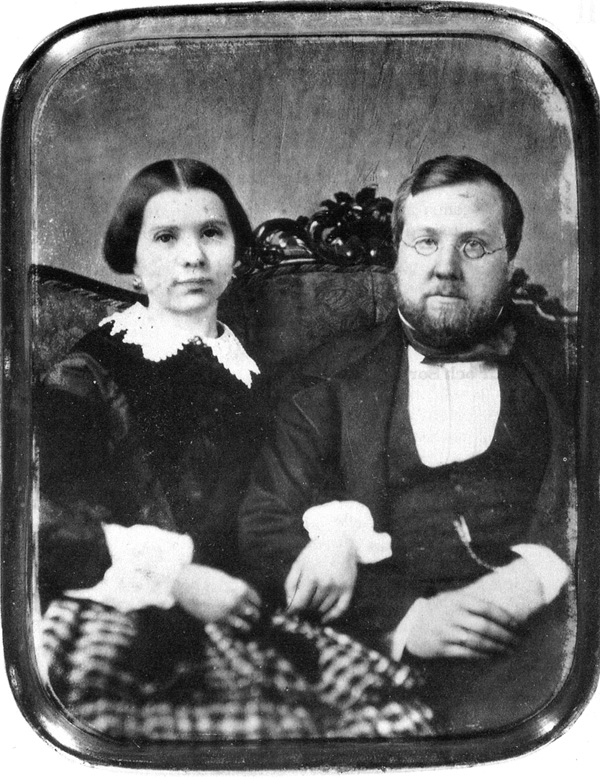
- Lotten von Düben with her husband Gustaf, ca. 1860
- Born: Carolina Charlotta Mariana von Bahr; 23 November 1828; Söderby, Uppland, Sweden
- Died: 25 December 1915 (aged 87); Södermanland, Sweden
- Occupation: Photographer
- Spouse: Gustaf von Düben
- Parents: Robert von Bahr (father); Eva Carolina Åkerhielm af Margretelund (mother)

Carolina Charlotta Mariana von Düben, commonly known as Lotten von Düben (née von Bahr; November 23, 1828 – December 25, 1915) was an early Swedish amateur photographer and a pioneering reportage and documentary photographer.

Her work constitute an important chapter in the history of Swedish photography. She is most notably remembered for her images of the Sami people.

== Early life ==
Born on 23 November 1828, the third of six children, in Söderby in Uppland to the noble von Bahr family; her father was the major Robert von Bahr and Baroness Eva Carolina Åkerhielm af Margretelund, both from aristocrat families. She grew up at both Söderby and Margretelund.

== Work ==
In 1868, her husband, Gustaf von Düben, began to compile a catalogue of Lapp skulls. It was illustrated with photographs taken by Lotten von Düben, probably based on the approach adopted by Carl Curman who had a photographic studio in the building where the couple lived.

Von Düben also took many landscape photographs of the Swedish mountains and waterfalls during her trips to Lapland. Unlike her contemporaries, she photographed the scenery to provide a record for herself rather than to sell the images. Taken in the open air rather than in a studio, her portraits show the Sami in their natural environment. Together with the work of Bertha Valerius and Rosalie Sjöman, von Düben's photographs constitute an important chapter in the history of Swedish photography.

== Expedition to Lapland ==
On 3 July 1868, the von Dübens left Stockholm by ship on the first expedition to Lapland, along with the assistant G. H. Santesson and the cook Johanna Björklund, undertaking a study of the Sami people. They took with them all the heavy photographic equipment they needed to produce iodinated collodion negatives. Using a stereo camera, Lotten von Dühen photographed the Samis first from the front, then in profile. In 1871, they returned to the area, this time with two cameras. To document their findings, in 1873 Gustaf von Düben published Om Lappland och Lapparne, företrädesvis de Svenske: Ethnografiska Studier af Gustaf von Düben which was illustrated with his wife's photographs.

== Personal life ==
In 1857, she married Baron Gustaf von Düben, a member of the Düben family, and a doctor of medicine and professor of pathological anatomy at the Karolinska Institute in Stockholm.

Von Düben died at Nysund on 25 December 1915.

== Gallery of photographs ==
The photographs below are all portraits of Sami people taken by Lotten von Düden:

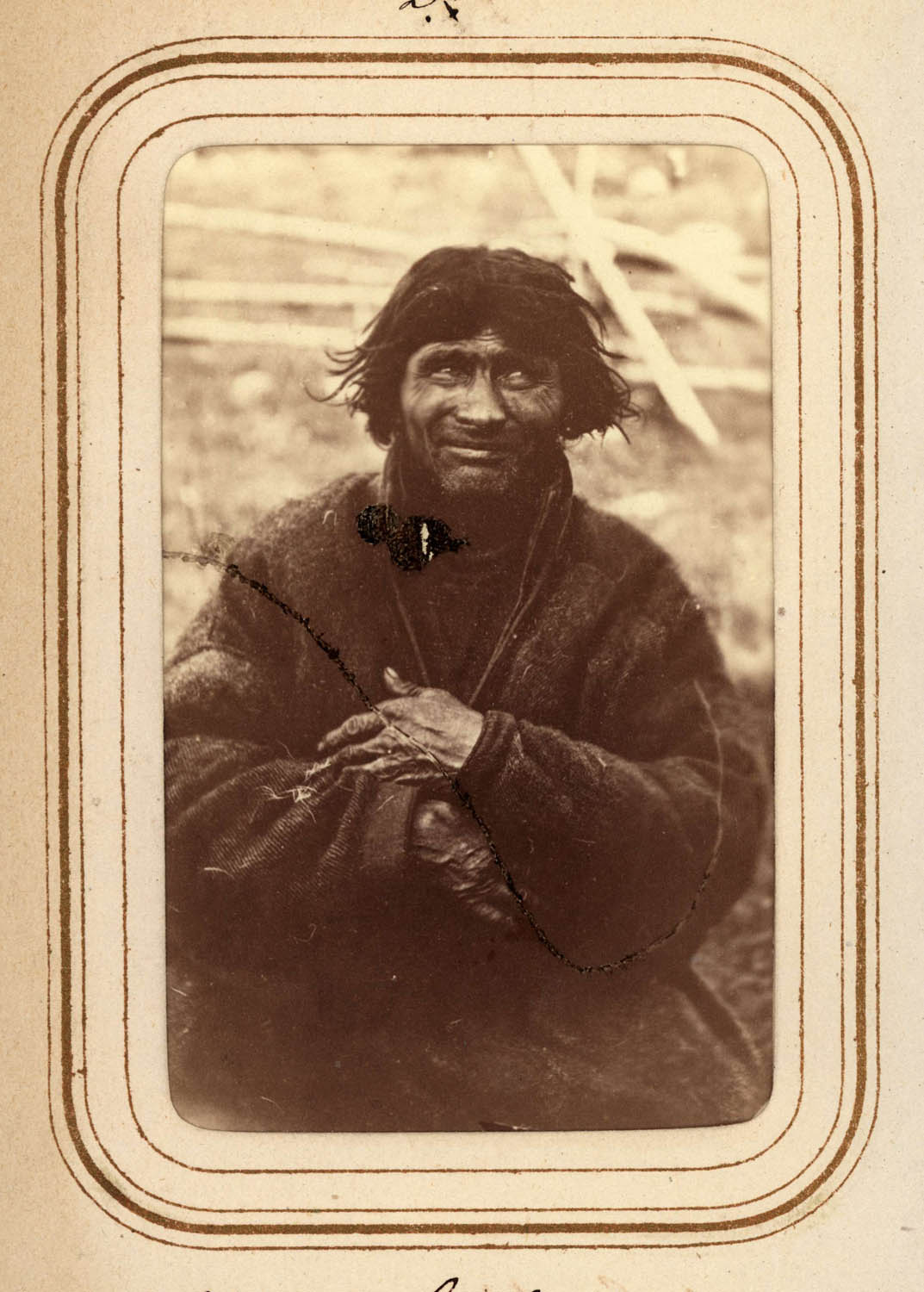
Nicka Gruvvisare, age 64, Sirkas (1868)

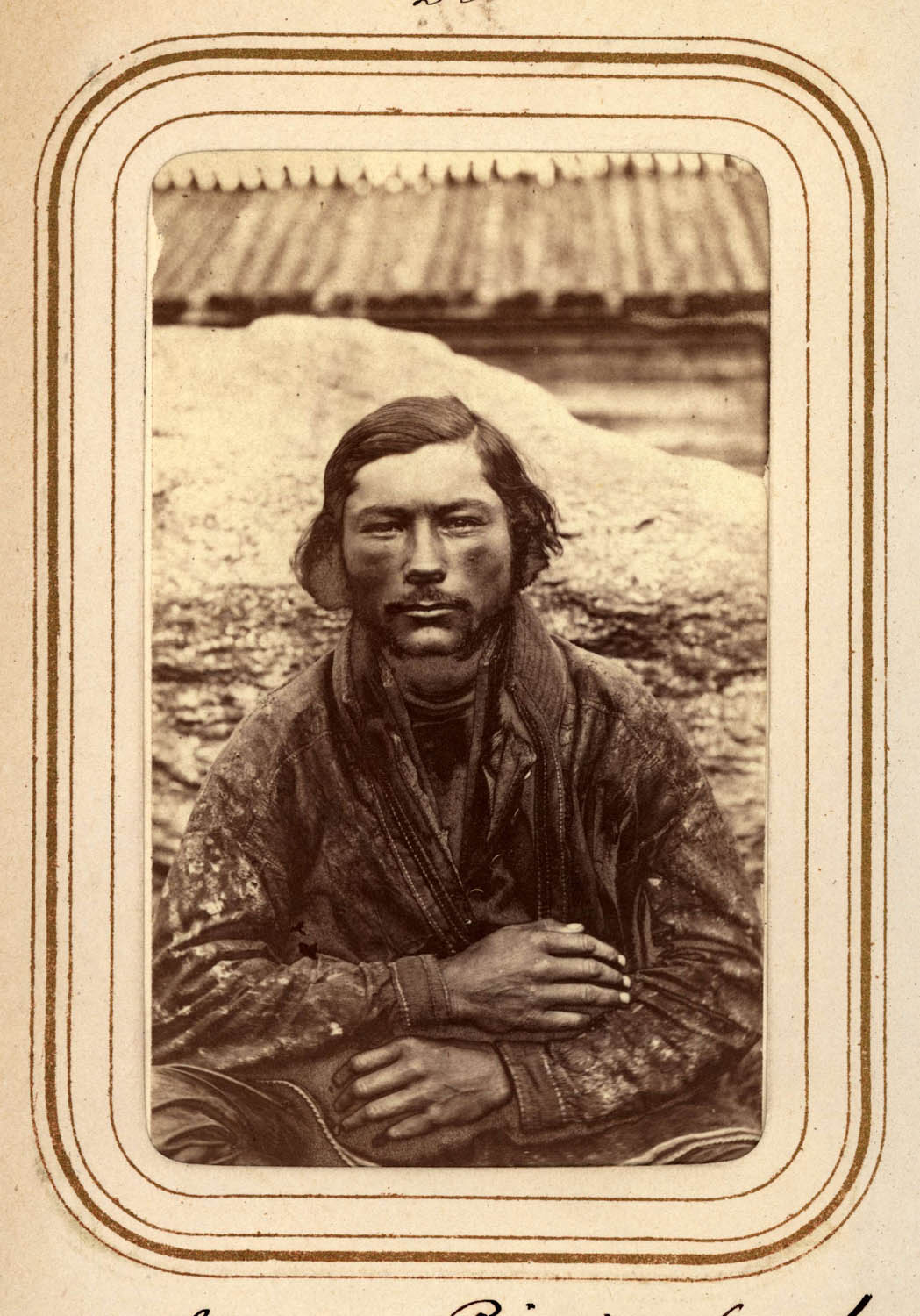
Amma Pirkit Larsson, Tuorpon (1868)

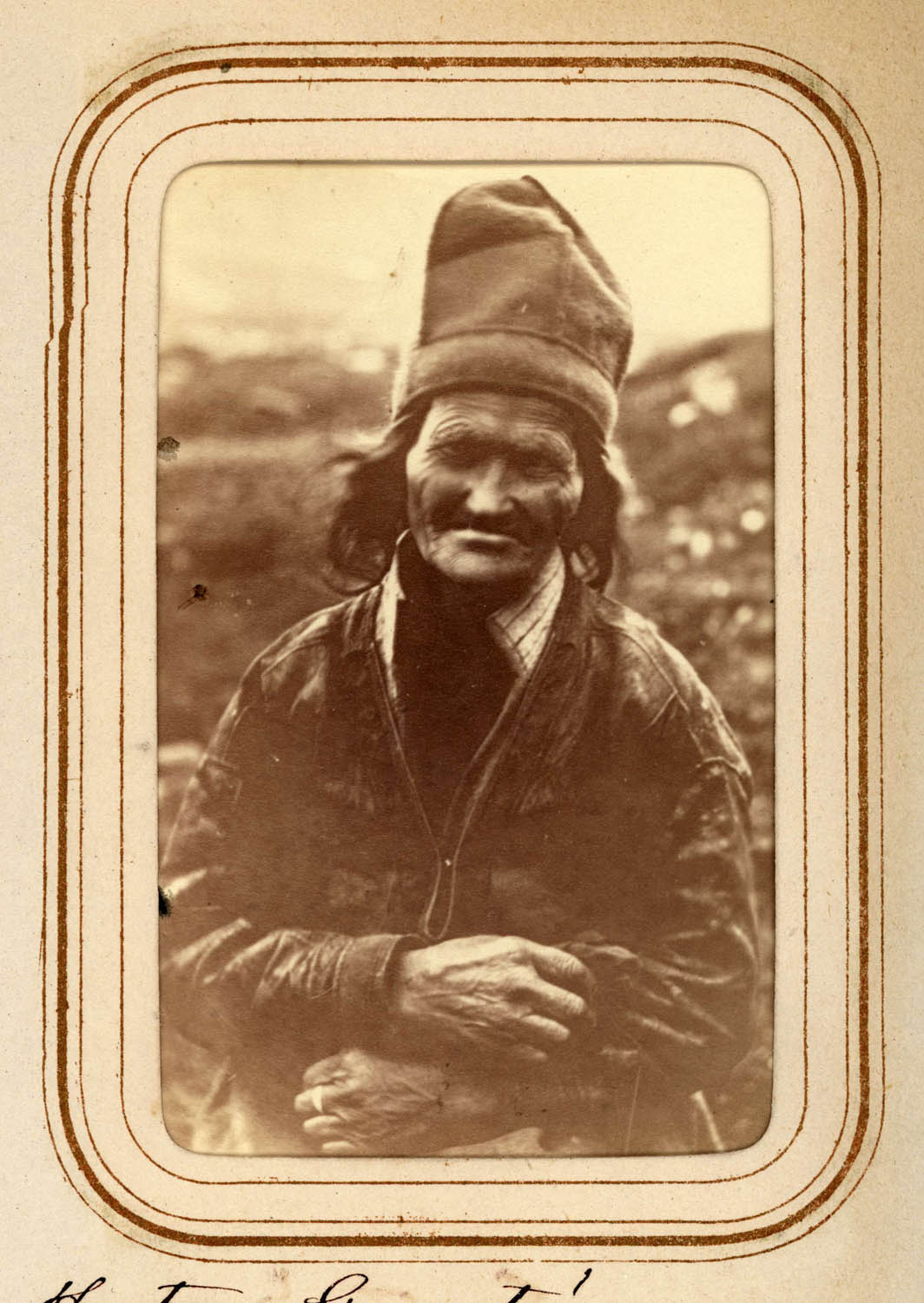
Nils Granström's wife, Tuorpon (1868)

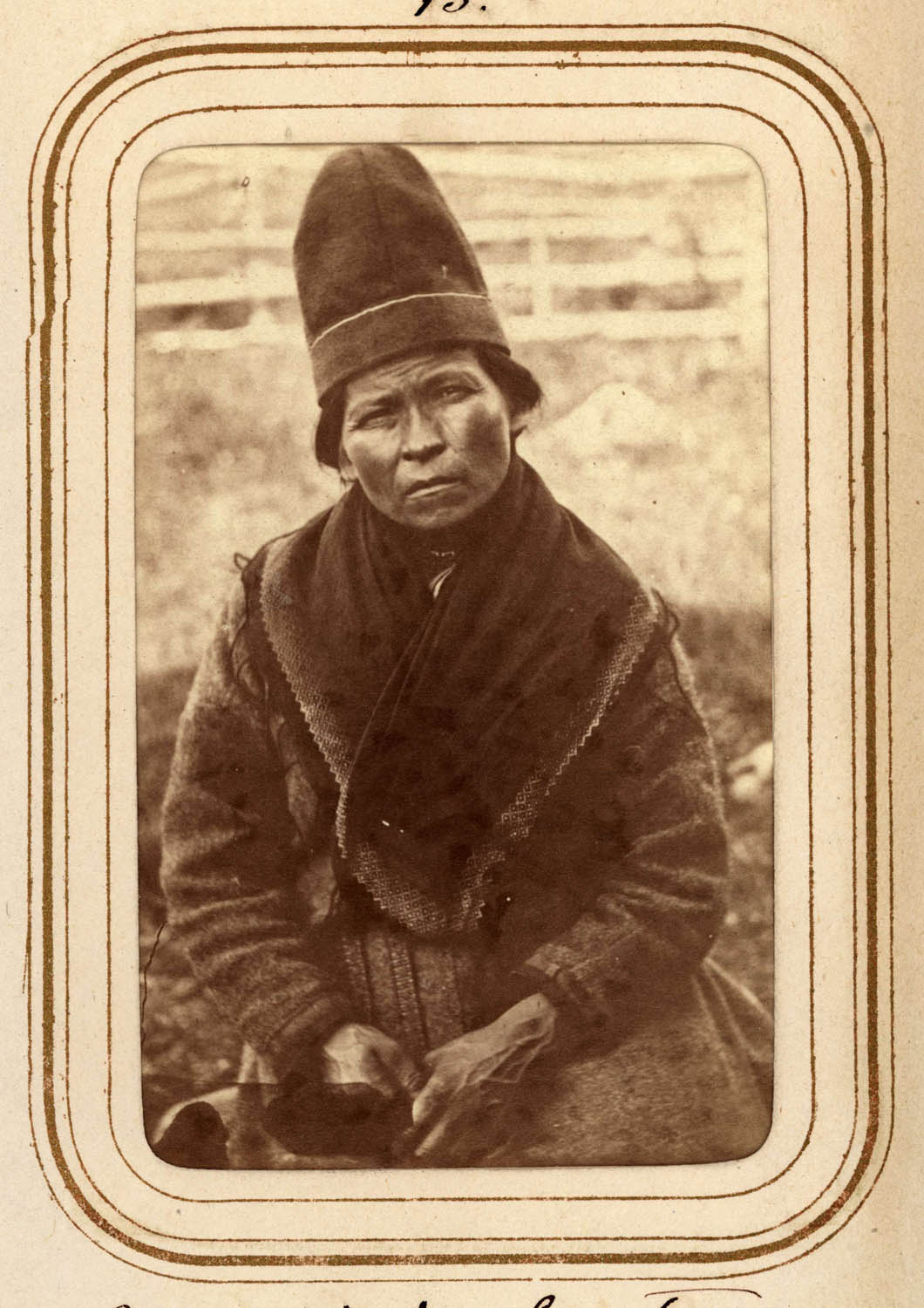
Elsa Nilsdotter Länta, age 35, Sirka (1868)

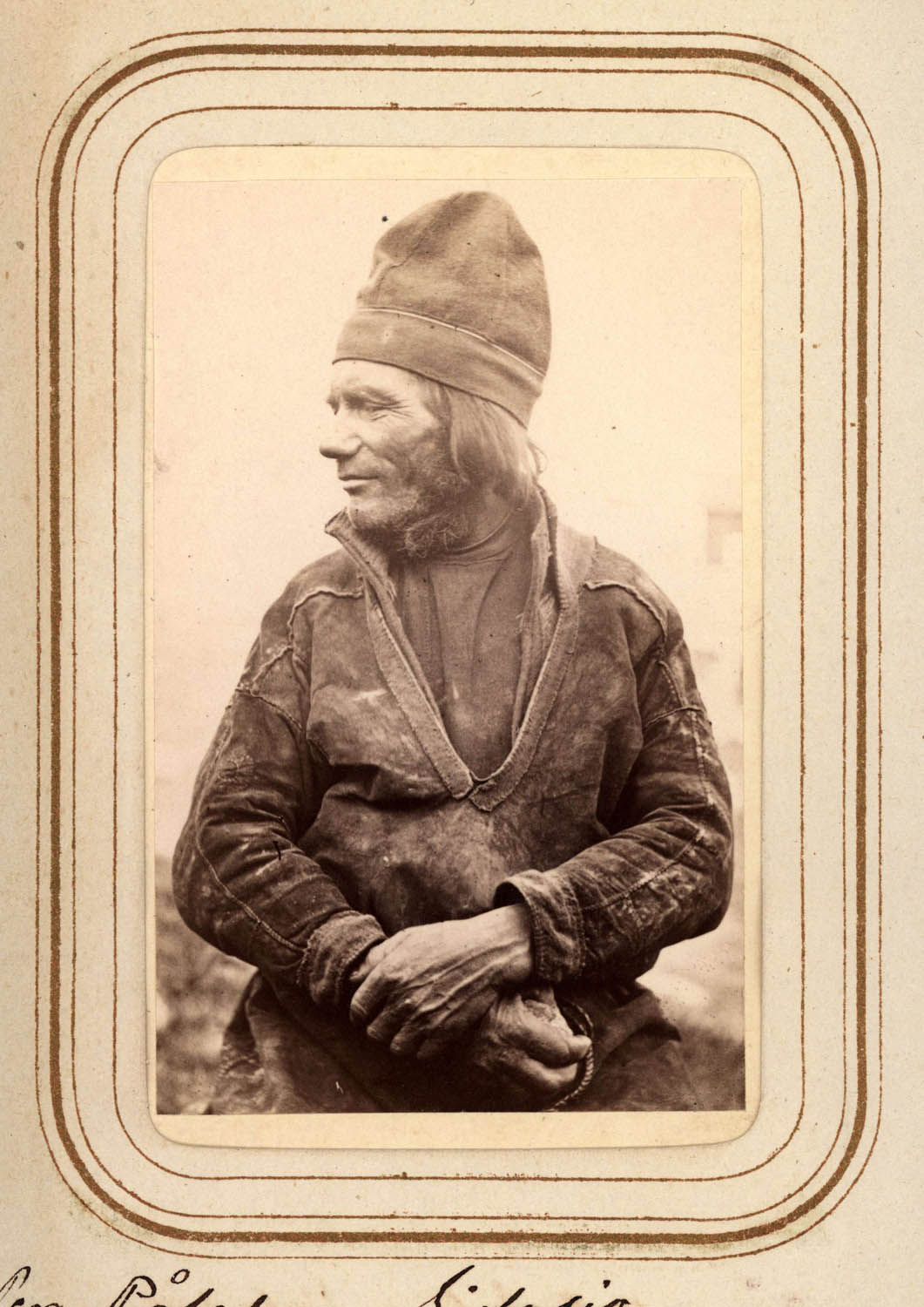
Per Pålsson Sjålsa, age 60, Sjokksjokk (1868)

== See also ==
- Düben family
- History of photography
- Sámi history
