= International Journal of Paediatric Dentistry =

- Discipline: Paediatric dentistry
- Language: English
- Edited by: Nicola Innes

Publication details
- History: 1991-present
- Publisher: John Wiley & Sons on behalf of the International Association of Paediatric Dentistry and British Society of Paediatric Dentistry
- Frequency: Bimonthly
- Open access: Hybrid
- Impact factor: 2.2 (2025)

Standard abbreviations
- ISO 4: Int. J. Paediatr. Dent.

Indexing
- ISSN: 0960-7439 (print); 1365-263X (web)
- OCLC no.: 474773850

Links
- Journal homepage; Online access; Online archive

The International Journal of Paediatric Dentistry is a bimonthly peer-reviewed medical journal covering research in Paediatric dentistry. It was established in 1991 and is published by John Wiley & Sons on behalf of the International Association of Paediatric Dentistry and British Society of Paediatric Dentistry. It was formed from the merger of the journals of these two societies.

The journal publishes the following types of papers: Scientific articles, Reviews, Case reports, Clinical techniques, Short communications, and Abstracts of Current Paediatric Dental Research.

== Abstracting and indexing ==
The journal is abstracted and indexed in:

- Current Contents/Clinical Medicine
- Health Economic Evaluations Database
- Index Medicus/MEDLINE
- PubMed Dietary Supplement Subset
- Science Citation Index Expanded

According to the Journal Citation Reports, the journal has a 2020 impact factor of 3.455.
