= Primary Dental Journal =

Peer-reviewed medical journal

- Discipline: Dentistry
- Language: English
- Edited by: Igor Blum

Publication details
- Former names: Primary Dental Care; Team in Practice; First-hand
- History: 1994-present
- Publisher: SAGE Publishing on behalf of the College of General Dentistry (United Kingdom)
- Frequency: Quarterly
- Open access: Hybrid

Standard abbreviations
- ISO 4: Prim. Dent. J.
- NLM: Prim Dent J

Indexing
- ISSN: 2050-1684 (print); 2050-1692 (web)
- OCLC no.: 817904464
- Primary Dental Care
- ISSN: 1355-7610 (print); 1741-9344 (web)
- Team in practice
- ISSN: 1741-9379 (print); 1741-9352 (web)
- First-hand
- ISSN: 1473-9526

Links
- Journal homepage; Current issue; Online archive

The Primary Dental Journal is a quarterly peer-reviewed medical journal aimed at primary dental care practitioners. It is published by SAGE Publishing on behalf of the College of General Dentistry, of which it is its official journal. The editor-in-chief is Professor Igor Blum.

== History ==
The journal was established in 2012 following the merger of previous publications, Primary Dental Care (which was first published in 1994), Team in Practice (which was first published in 2004), and First-hand (the newsletter of the Faculty of General Dental Practitioners). Previously published by Sage under the Faculty of General Dental Practice of the Royal College of Surgeons of England, since July 2021 the Primary Dental Journal has been published under the College of General Dentistry (CGDent).

== Content ==
The journal publishes news, editorials, features on current issues, research, clinical articles, and scenario articles. It publishes three themed issues on topics such as tooth wear, orthodontics, dental emergencies, and leadership, management, and professionalism and one general issue per year.

== Abstracting and indexing ==
The journal is abstracted and indexed in MEDLINE/PubMed, Scopus, and CINAHL.

== See also ==
- List of dental journals
