= Faculty of General Dental Practice =

British dentistry organisation

Coordinates: 51°30′55″N 0°6′57″W

The Faculty of General Dental Practice (UK) (FGDP(UK)) was a UK professional body for general dental practitioners. It was established in 1992 as a faculty of the Royal College of Surgeons of England and was located in the College’s headquarters in Lincoln’s Inn Fields, London. In July 2021, it transferred into the independent College of General Dentistry.

Membership of the FGDP(UK) was open to all dentists and dental surgeons, and other dental care professionals registered with the General Dental Council were able to join as Affiliate Members from 2005. It opened student membership to those in years 4 or 5 of their Bachelor of Dental Surgery undergraduate degree in 2011.

== Education ==
FGDP(UK) was involved in many educational aspects of dental care in general practice and primary dental care. It ran a programme of training courses and continuous professional development for the whole dental team. It also provided the continuing professional development (CPD) and training needs of both dentists and dental care professionals working in primary care.

The Faculty awarded a number of postgraduate qualifications:

- MJDF
- Postgraduate Diploma in Restorative Dentistry
- Postgraduate Diploma in Implant Dentistry
- Postgraduate Diploma in Primary Care Oral Surgery
- Fellowship programme which was recognised by the National Qualifications Framework for England, Wales and Northern Ireland as a 'level 7' higher education award (equivalent to a Master's Degree)

== Books and publications ==
The Primary Dental Journal (PDJ) is a quarterly journal formerly published by FGDP (and now by the College of General Dentistry). The Journal was launched on 4 October 2012, and replaced the previous publications 'Primary Dental Care', 'Team in Practice' and 'First-Hand' Each issue focuses on a key topic in primary care dentistry combining research, clinical best practice papers and scenario articles.

Based on standards created by the FGDP(UK), it published a range of standards books and guidance for UK dentistry, many of which are now published by the College of General Dentistry. These publications were:

- Standards in Dentistry (2018) is a collection of standards and guidelines for primary dental care.
- Selection Criteria for Dental Radiography (2018)
- Dementia-Friendly Dentistry (2017)
- Clinical Examination and Record-Keeping (2016)
- Antimicrobial Prescribing for General Dental Practitioners (2016)
- Training Standards in Implant Dentistry (2016) summarises the training that should be undertaken to carry out implant dentistry safely, and the standards which should be met by training courses.
- Key Skills in Primary Dental Care (2014)
- An introduction to Research for Primary Dental Care (2011)
- Pathways in Practice (2003) is FGDP(UK)'s guide to being a General Dental Practitioner.

== Awards and honours ==
The Faculty of General Dental Practice (UK) conferred a range of awards and honours. These were conferred to individuals and in some instances organisations, that have made an impact on general dental practice and the dental profession:

- Honorary Fellowship
- Fellowship by Election
- Honorary Membership
- Dean’s Award
- Foundation Dentist Award
- Community Contribution Award

== See also ==
- Royal College of Surgeons of England
- Faculty of Dental Surgery
- Primary Dental Journal
