= The Cleft Palate-Craniofacial Journal =

- Discipline: Orthopedics
- Language: English
- Edited by: Jamie Perry

Publication details
- Former name: Cleft Palate Journal
- History: 1964–present
- Publisher: SAGE Publishing on behalf of the American Cleft Palate-Craniofacial Association
- Frequency: Monthly
- Impact factor: 1.347 (2019)

Standard abbreviations
- ISO 4: Cleft Palate-Craniofacial J.
- NLM: Cleft Palate Craniofac J

Indexing
- ISSN: 1055-6656 (print); 1545-1569 (web)
- OCLC no.: 960784164

Links
- Journal homepage; Online access; Online archive

The Cleft Palate-Craniofacial Journal is a monthly peer-reviewed medical journal. It was established in 1964 as the Cleft Palate Journal, obtaining its current title in 1991. The journal is published by SAGE Publishing on behalf of the American Cleft Palate-Craniofacial Association. It covers research on the etiology, prevention, diagnosis, and treatment of cleft palate and other craniofacial anomalies. The editor-in-chief is Jamie Perry.

== Abstracting and indexing ==
The journal is abstracted and indexed in:

- Current Contents/Clinical Medicine
- Embase
- Index Medicus/MEDLINE/PubMed
- Science Citation Index Expanded
- Scopus

According to the Journal Citation Reports, the journal has a 2019 impact factor of 1.347.

== See also ==
- List of medical journals
