= Journal of Dentistry =

- Discipline: Dentistry
- Language: English
- Edited by: Christopher D. Lynch

Publication details
- Former name(s): Dental Practitioner and Dental Record
- History: 1950-present
- Publisher: Elsevier
- Frequency: Bimonthly
- Impact factor: 4.991 (2021)

Standard abbreviations
- ISO 4: J. Dent.

Indexing
- CODEN: JDENAB
- ISSN: 0300-5712 (print); 1879-176X (web)
- OCLC no.: 38934487

Links
- Journal homepage; Online access; Online archive

The Journal of Dentistry is a bimonthly peer-reviewed medical journal in the field of dentistry. It was established in 1950 as the Dental Practitioner and Dental Record, obtaining its current name in 1972. It is published by Elsevier and the editor-in-chief is Christopher D. Lynch (Cardiff University). According to the Journal Citation Reports, the journal has a 2021 impact factor of 4.991.
