= Swedish Dental Association =

Logo.

The Swedish Dental Association (Swedish: Sveriges Tandläkarförbund) is the main odontological organization in Sweden. It deals with issues affecting the role of dentists, professional ethics, education and science.

The Swedish Dental Association was established in 1908 and has currently around 9,500 members, of whom around 4,000 members practice in the public dental service and 3,500 of them are private practitioners. In addition, some 250 teachers at the four Swedish dental faculties are members of the association. The association publishes two journals, the Tandläkartidningen and the Swedish Dental Journal, the latter published in English, 4 times a year to present Swedish odontological research.

== See also ==
- Dentistry
- Swedish Dental Society
