= Andrew Eder =

British professor

Andrew Eder BDS MSc MRD FDS FCGDent FHEA
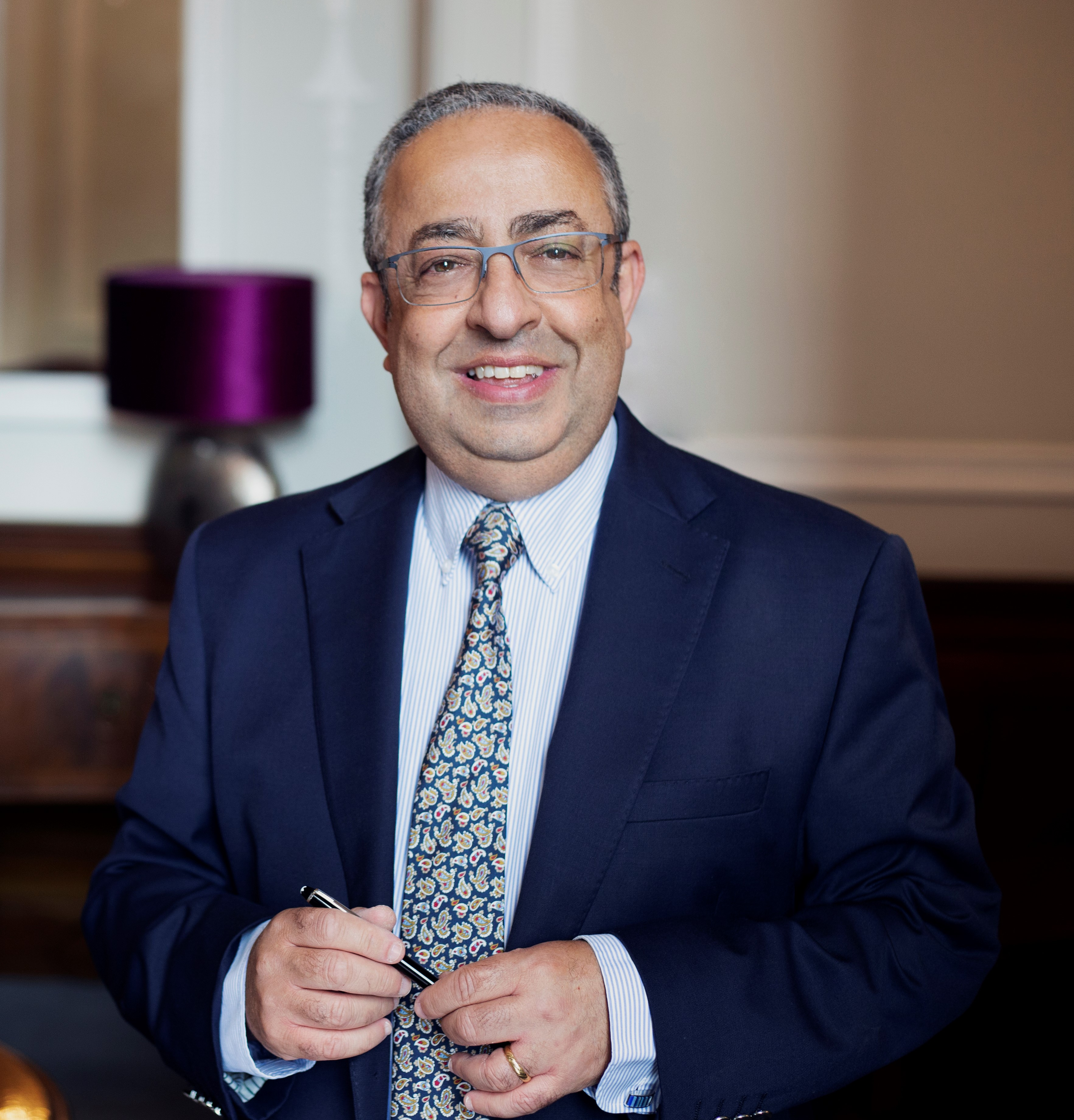
- Born: Andrew Howard Eric Eder; 21 April 1964 (age 62); London, England
- Education: North Bridge House School; St Paul's School, London; King's College London School of Medicine and Dentistry; UCL Eastman Dental Institute
- Spouse: Rosina Jayne (née Saideman) (m.1988)
- Children: 3
- Family: Sir Bernard Eder (brother)
- Medical career
- Profession: Professor
- Field: Dentistry
- Institutions: UCL Eastman Dental Institute
- Notable works: Tooth Wear (2022); Tooth Surface Loss (2000)
- Website: www.andreweder.co.uk

Andrew Howard Eric Eder (born 21 April 1964) is a British dentist, clinical academic, strategic board adviser, and charity trustee. He is Emeritus Professor of Restorative Dentistry and Dental Education at the UCL Eastman Dental Institute, and a specialist in restorative dentistry and prosthodontics at the Harley Street Dental and Implant Clinic. He was appointed Chair of the Board at the Academy of Medical Royal Colleges for a three-year term in April 2022.

He co-edited Tooth Surface Loss in 2000 and Tooth Wear in 2022, both published by the British Dental Journal, and has contributed to textbooks and authored over 100 articles. He also served as president of the Royal Society of Medicine's Odontological Section from 2001 to 2002 and the British Society for Restorative Dentistry from 2005 to 2006.

He is the younger brother of The Hon Sir Bernard Eder, an English lawyer and a former High Court judge.

== Education ==
Eder was educated at North Bridge House School and St Paul's School, London. He completed his Bachelor of Dental Surgery from King's College London School of Medicine and Dentistry in 1986 and his masters in conservative dentistry from the UCL Eastman Dental Institute in 1990.

He achieved his Membership in Restorative Dentistry from the Royal College of Surgeons of England and the Royal College of Physicians and Surgeons of Glasgow in 1994. In 2002, he was elected to Fellowship of the Higher Education Academy and was awarded an Honorary Fellowship in Dental Surgery from the Royal College of Surgeons of Edinburgh in 2003, both in recognition of his contribution to dental education. Eder was elected to Fellowship of the College of General Dentistry and Fellowship in Dental Surgery by the Royal College of Surgeons of England, both in 2021.

== Academic career ==
Eder has been associated with the UCL Eastman Dental Institute, the postgraduate dental school of University College London, since 1989. In 2002, he was appointed honorary consultant in restorative dentistry at UCLH NHS Foundation Trust and, in 2008, to a chair in restorative dentistry and dental education at the UCL Eastman Dental Institute.

He served as director of continuing professional development at the UCL Eastman Dental Institute from 2002 to 2012, director of education at the UCL Eastman Dental Institute from 2005 to 2012, associate dean for continuing education at the UCL School of Life and Medical Sciences from 2008 to 2012, and Pro-Vice-Provost at UCL from 2013 to 2017.

In March 2018, he was appointed emeritus professor of restorative dentistry and dental education at the UCL Eastman Dental Institute.

Eder was elected Chair of the Membership in Restorative Dentistry Examination at the Royal College of Surgeons of England and Royal College of Physicians and Surgeons of Glasgow in 2016, having served as an examiner since 2009. He led development of the new Restorative Specialty Membership Examinations and oversaw successful implementation as Chair of the Examination Board until 2022.

He also served on the editorial boards of the British Dental Journal from 2005 to 2017, the European Journal of Prosthodontics and Restorative Dentistry from 1995 to 2014, and the Faculty Dental Journal at the Royal College of Surgeons of England where he has been the AI and Digital Innovation Lead since 2023.

Since 2003, he has been chair of the charitable trust of Alpha Omega, the oldest international dental fraternity. In June 2017, Eder was elected to the Board of the Faculty of Dental Surgery at the Royal College of Surgeons of England for a six-year term. In July of that year, he was elected a trustee of the United Synagogue for a six-year term. Since 2023, he has been a Specialist List Assessor and Appeals Panel Member for the General Dental Council.

In 2026, Eder was appointed Trustee of the College of General Dentistry and Head of Dental Education for PortmanDentex, a dental corporate with 2,400 clinicians in 370 practices across the UK.

== Publications ==
=== Books ===
- Eder, Andrew; Faigenblum, Maurice (2022). Tooth Wear. Springer Nature. ISBN 9783030861094.
- Eder, Andrew; Ibbetson, Richard (2000). Tooth Surface Loss. Palgrave Macmillan UK. ISBN 9780904588668.
- Eder, Andrew; Wickens, J. (1996). "Surface treatment of gold alloys for resin adhesion". Quintessence International. 27 (1): 35–40. PMID 9063210.

=== Textbooks ===
- Scully, C.; Wilson, N., eds. (2006). Culturally Sensitive Oral Health Care. Quintessence International Publishing Group. ISBN 978-1850971184.
- Scully, C; Diz Dios, P., eds. (2007). Special Care in Dentistry: Handbook of Oral Healthcare. Churchill Livingstone. ISBN 9780443071515.

== Recognition ==
- UCL Provost's Teaching Award
- Listed in the Who's Who (UK) in 2012
- Listed in Debrett's People of Today
- Awarded the Certificate of Merit for Services to Global Philanthropy by Alpha Omega International Dental Fraternity
