= Conservative Dentistry =

Dentistry focused on dental crowns and bridges

- ICD-9-CM: 23.2-23.6
- MeSH: D011476

Conservative Dentistry, also known as operative dentistry or crown and bridge dentistry, is the area of dentistry that focuses on dental crowns and bridges.

== Treatment Modalities ==
- Restorations
- Bridge
- Crown
- Veneer
- Root canal treatment
- Inlays and onlays
- Fixed prosthodontics

=== Restoration ===
Restorations, commonly referred to as fillings, are one of the primary treatments within conservative dentistry. They are used to repair teeth damaged by dental caries (tooth decay) or trauma, restoring the tooth's form and function while preserving as much healthy tooth structure as possible. The three main direct restorative materials used in clinical practice are dental amalgam, composite resin, and glass ionomer cement (GIC).

==== Dental amalgam ====
Amalgam is composed primarily of mercury combined with a metal alloy, typically containing silver, tin, and copper. It has historically been a popular restorative choice due to its strength, longevity, and affordability, especially for posterior teeth, with studies reporting a mean lifespan of around 12 years.

Despite this, its use has been steadily declining worldwide. The Minamata Convention on Mercury, which came into force in 2017, prompted international discussions among dental and public health authorities about reducing amalgam use, driven by concerns over mercury's impact on human health and the environment.

==== Composite resin ====
As amalgam use decreases following the Minamata Convention, composite resin is increasingly expected to become the go-to material for direct tooth restoration. Tooth-coloured and adhesive in nature, composite resin offers aesthetic advantages and allows for more conservative cavity preparation compared to amalgam. Ongoing improvements in material science and bonding techniques have significantly improved its clinical durability over time.

==== Glass ionomer cement (GIC) ====
GIC is a multi-purpose restorative material, notable for its ability to chemically bond to tooth structure, its biocompatibility, and its capacity to release fluoride over an extended period. The gradual release of fluoride into the space between the restoration and tooth surface acts to inhibit the development of secondary caries, making GIC particularly well-suited for patients who are at higher risk of tooth decay. Evidence from a large systematic review and meta-analysis supports this, showing that GIC restorations were associated with significantly fewer cases of secondary caries than amalgam restorations across both primary and permanent teeth. Its clinical value has been formally recognised by the WHO, which included GIC on its Model List of Essential Medicines in 2021

=== Bridge ===
A bridge or fixed dental bridge is a permanent, non-removable appliance which replaces one or more missing teeth. This can help to restore functional needs such as speech and chewing, as well as improving aesthetics. Bridges consist of false, artificial teeth which fill the gap of missing teeth, known as pontics. They require support from natural teeth or dental implants on one or either side of the artificial teeth. These teeth are known as abutments. They are estimated to last for ~10 years. However, inadequate maintenance, sustained damage and poor support from abutment teeth can greatly reduce their lifespans.

=== Crown ===
Dental crowns are a type of prosthetic restoration that completely encapsulates the coronal portion of a tooth. They are primarily indicated for teeth with extensive structural loss due to fractures, cracks, decay, and most endodontically treated posterior teeth.

Although full-coverage crowns are still more popular than partial-coverage crowns, conservative dentistry aims to prefer dental procedures such as inlays, overlays, and endocrowns to minimise the amount of healthy tooth structure that is removed to accommodate full-coverage crowns.

=== Veneers ===
Veneers are thin shells of porcelain or composite resin that are bonded to the front surfaces of teeth with minimal or no preparation of the enamel to improve aesthetics by correcting discoloration, chips, gaps, or misalignment, making them a conservative treatment option that preserves maximum natural tooth structure compared to more invasive restorations like crowns.

=== Preventive resin restoration (PRR) ===
Preventive resin restoration (PRR) is a procedure that combines conservative composite restorations with preventive dental sealants, which aims to conserve tooth structure but also enhances longevity and integrity of the tooth. Unlike traditional restorations, PRRs require minimal tooth preparation, which shows significance in paediatric and adolescent patients, where ensuring tooth vitality is crucial. PRR involves the selective removal of carious tissues, followed by the application of a resin-based composite, and finally application of a sealant to prevent secondary caries. The use of PRR in clinical settings has shown considerable success in halting the progression of early carious lesions in occlusal surfaces. However, despite the advantages, the longevity of PRRs can be influenced by factors such as the quality of the resin material, the technique of the practitioner, and the patient's adherence to follow-up care.

=== Root canal treatment (RCT) ===
Root canal treatment which is also known as the endodontic treatment, is a dental procedure used to treat infection or inflammation inside the pulp. During the procedure, the infected or damaged pulp tissue is removed, the root canals are cleaned, shaped and disinfected, and then filled and sealed to preserve the natural tooth.

Indications for RCT is when the pulp of tooth becomes infected, inflamed or irreversibly damaged. Common indications include:

- Deep dental caries
- Dental abscess
- Trauma causing cracked or fractured tooth
- Severe tooth pain or prolonged sensitivity to hot and cold
- Pulp infection due to leaking restorations or gum disease
- Pulp necrosis

=== Inlay & Onlay ===
Inlays and onlays are indirect dental restorations used to restore posterior teeth with moderate loss of tooth structure while preserving more healthy tooth tissue compared with full crowns.

An inlay is an intracoronal restoration that fits within the cusps of the tooth and is indicated when the cusps remain intact.

In contrast, an onlay extends to cover one or more cusps, providing additional reinforcement and protection against fracture in weakened teeth..

Both restorations can be fabricated from ceramic, composite resin, or gold and are commonly indicated for large Class I or II restorations, replacement of defective fillings and situations where improved proximal contact and anatomy are required.

Onlays are particularly indicated for teeth with weakened cusps, large MOD cavities, and some endodontically treated posterior teeth that require cuspal protection to prevent fractures.

Compared with direct restorations, inlays and onlays demonstrate improved marginal adaptation, wear resistance, and longevity.. Studies have shown favorable long-term prognosis, with gold and ceramic restorations often lasting more than 15–20 years when proper bonding technique, occlusal control, and oral hygiene are maintained. However, prognosis may be compromised in patients with bruxism, poor moisture control during cementation, or inadequate tooth preparation design.

== See also ==
- American College of Prosthodontists
- British Society for Restorative Dentistry
- Commonly used terms of relationship and comparison in dentistry
- Craniofacial prosthesis
- Dental fear
- Dental restoration
- Dental braces
- Mandibular advancement splint
- Oral and maxillofacial surgery
- Dental implant
- European Journal of Prosthodontics and Restorative Dentistry
