= Eder (surname) =

Eder is a surname. Notable people with the surname include:

- Alejandro Eder (born 1975), Colombian politician and specialist
- Alfred Eder (born 1953), Austrian biathlete
- Alon Eder (born 1983), Israeli singer-songwriter and musician
- Andrea Eder-Gitschthaler (born 1961), Austrian politician
- Andrew Eder (born 1964), British dentist, clinical academic, strategic board adviser and charity trustee
- Bernard Eder (born 1952), English barrister and judge
- Birgitta Eder (born 1962), Austrian archaeologist and Mycenologist
- Claudia Eder (born 1948), German singer
- David Eder (1865–1936), British psychoanalyst, physician, Zionist and writer
- Elfi Eder (born 1970), Austrian alpine skier
- Franz Xaver Eder (1925–2013), German Roman Catholic bishop
- Georg Eder (1928–2015), Austrian Roman Catholic bishop
- Georg-Peter Eder (1921–1986), German fighter pilot
- Gernot Eder (born 1965), German sport shooter
- Hannes Eder (born 1983), Austrian football player
- Hans Eder (disambiguation), several people
- Heike Eder (born 1988), Austrian Paralympic alpine skier
- Helmut Eder (1916–2005), Austrian composer
- Jake Eder (born 1998), American professional baseball player
- James Martin Eder (1838–1921), Colombian sugar industry pioneer
- Jasmin Eder (born 1992), Austrian football player
- Jeanne Eder-Schwyzer (1894–1957), Swiss women's rights activist
- Johannes Eder (born 1979), Austrian cross-country skier
- John Eder (born 1969), American politician
- Josef Eder (born 1942), Austrian bobsledder
- Josef Maria Eder (1855–1944), Austrian chemist specialized in the chemistry of photography
- Josefin Eder (born 1995), German sport shooter
- Katie Eder, American climate and social justice organizer
- Katrin Eder (born 1976), politician (The Greens)
- Krisztián Éder (born 1988), Hungarian photographer
- Linda Eder (born 1961), American singer and actress
- Lisa Eder (born 2001), Austrian ski jumper
- Mari Eder (born 1987), Finnish biathlete and cross-country skier
- Mari K. Eder, United States Army officer
- Markus Eder (born 1990), Italian freestyle skier
- Martin Eder (born 1968), German painter
- Michael Eder (born 1961), German alpine skier
- Natalija Eder (born 1980), Austrian Paralympic athlete
- Norbert Eder (1955–2019), German football player
- Richard Eder (1932–2014), American critic
- Róbert Éder (1888–?), Hungarian rower
- Simon Eder (born 1983), Austrian biathlete
- Simone Eder (born 1974), Austrian luger
- Sylvia Eder (born 1965), Austrian alpine skier
- Thomas Eder (born 1980), Austrian football player
- Timo Eder (born 2005), German artistic gymnast
- Wolfgang Eder (born 1952), Austrian businessman

== See also ==
- Éder (given name), Portuguese or Spanish given name
