= Ted Wong (general) =

United States Army general

Major general Ted Wong DDS
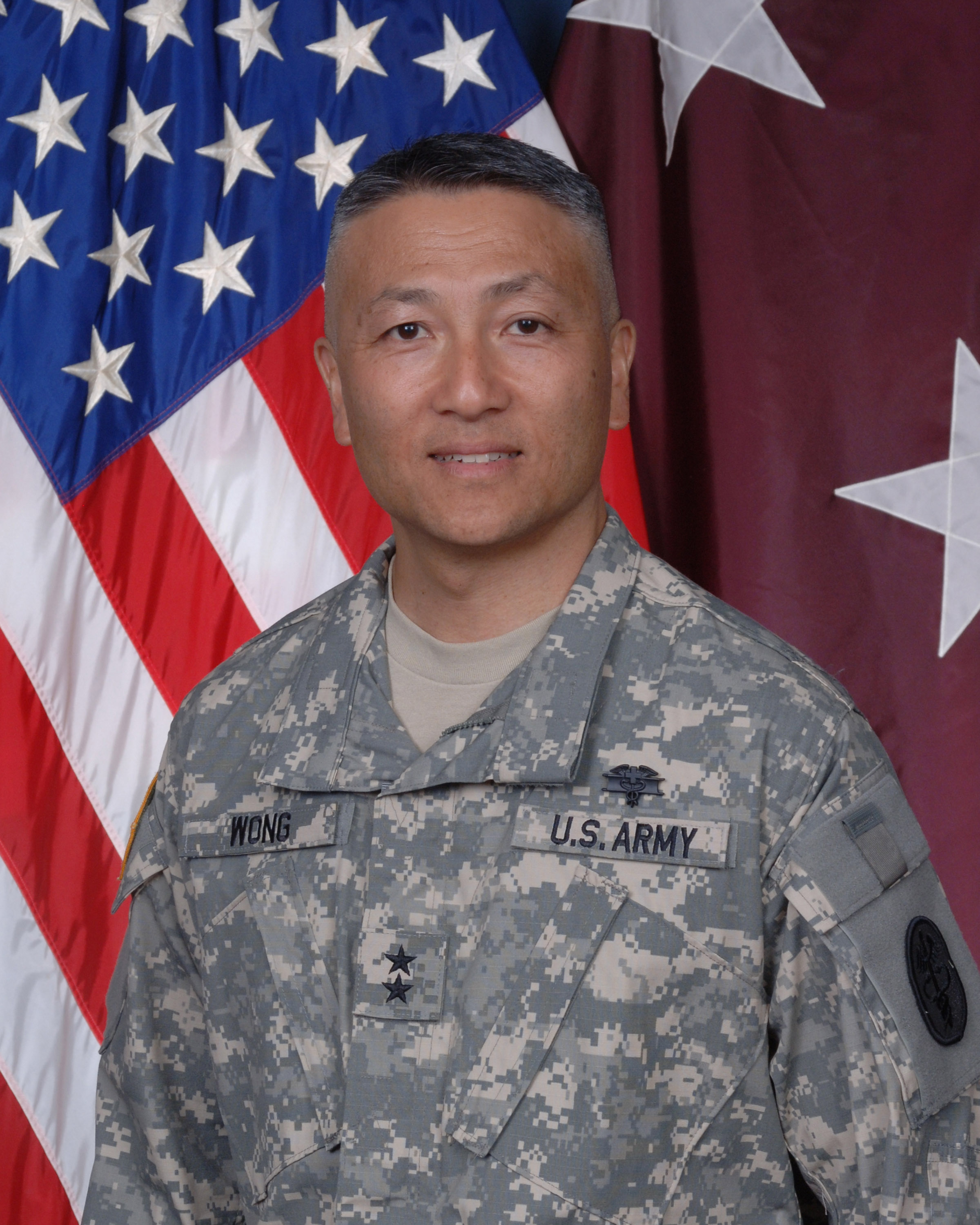
- Official US Army picture of Major General Ted Wong.
- Born: 22 October 1958 (age 67); San Bernardino, California, USA
- Military career
- Allegiance: United States
- Branch: United States Army
- Service years: 1984–2014
- Rank: Major general
- Commands: Southern Regional Medical Command; San Antonio Military Medical Center; William Beaumont Army Medical Center; US Army Dental Corps; US Army Dental Command

Ming T. "Ted" Wong (born 22 October 1958) is a retired major general and dentist in the United States Army. He was Chief of the US Army Dental Corps from 2010 until his retirement in 2014 and variously served as Commander for the Western Regional Medical Command, the North Atlantic Regional Dental Command, the Southern Regional Medical Command, William Beaumont Army Medical Center, the Northern Regional Medical Command, and the Brooke Army Medical Center, among others.

== Early life ==
Wong is a Southern California native and son of Po-Ping Wong of Kowloon, a dentist and 1965 graduate of UCSF School of Dentistry. His parents emigrated from China in the early 1950s. His paternal grandfather was a General Officer in the Chinese Nationalist Army and his maternal grandfather was a senior railroad executive who aided US Allied forces during World War II and was awarded with the Commander's Award for Civilian Service for his efforts.

== Education and military career ==
Wong graduated from UCLA as a Distinguished Military Graduate in 1980 and from UCSF School of Dentistry, his father's alma mater, in 1984. After graduation, he joined the United States Army and was assigned to a dental clinic at a base in Stuttgart. He completed his general dentistry residency at Fort Sill and his specialized residency in prosthodontics at Fort Sam Houston. He is a board-certified dentist.

He has a master's degree in healthcare administration from Baylor University. His military education includes AMEDD Officer Basic and Advanced Courses, the Command and General Staff College, the Combined Arms Services Staff School, and the Joint Medical Executive Skills Institute CAPSTONE Symposium; he also has a master's degree in strategic studies from the United States Army War College.

After graduating from the Army War College, he was a senior dental staff officer at the Office of the Surgeon General (OSG). Other clinical positions include Officer in Command at the Kelley Barracks Dental Clinic, Staff Officer and staff prosthodontist at Fort Sam Houston, Dental Executive Fellow at the OSG, and Chief of the AMEDD Center and School's dental lab.

From 2008 to 2010, he served as the ninth US Army Dental Commander and was the first Asian-American to ever hold this position. In 2010, he was promoted to major general and was appointed to Chief of the US Army Dental Corps, the 26th Chief overall and the first Chinese-American in the role. He held this position until his retirement in 2014. He was also appointed Deputy Commanding General for the Western Regional Medical Command and the Commanding General for the William Beaumont Army Medical Center in 2010.

In 2011, he was "hand-picked" by Surgeon General Lt. Gen. Patricia Horoho as the San Antonio Military Health System's first deputy director in 2011 following Brooke Army Medical Center's merger with Wilford Hall. From 2011 to 2013, he commanded the Southern Regional Medical Command. In 2013, he left Fort Sam Houston to work as the Commanding General of the Northern Regional Medical Command at Fort Belvoir.

He has also been the Deputy Commanding General of the Joint Readiness Training Center at Fort Bliss, the deputy director of San Antonio Military Medical Center, and the Commander of the North Atlantic Regional Dental Command, Walter Reed Dental Activity, the Dental Clinic Command at the Presidio of the Monterey, and the 665th Medical Company while in Korea.

Wong retired from the military in 2014 and worked at UnitedHealth Group, where he held several executive positions, until 2020.

== Selected honors ==
He is on the board of directors for the Association of Army Dentistry and was on the 2014 American Dental Education Association (ADEA) Council of Deans in the House of Delegates.

He has earned the following awards from the United States Armed Forces:

Award	Ribbon	Ref
Legion of Merit	Two OLC	
Meritorious Service Medal	Six OLC	
Commendation Medal	Two OLC	
Achievement Medal	Three OLC	
National Defense Service Medal	One star	
Expert Field Medical Badge		
Army Staff Identification Badge		

Awards earned from other sources:

Award	Award Body	Notes	Ref
"A" Proficiency Designator	Surgeon General		
Fairbank Medal	Dental Corps		
Order of Military Medical Merit	United States Army Health Services Command		
ADA Membership	American Dental Association		
American Board of Prosthodontics Diplomate	American College of Prosthodontists		
ACP Fellow	American College of Prosthodontists		
ICD Fellow	International College of Dentists		
Fellow	Pierre Fauchard Academy		
Federal Services Award	American College of Prosthodontists	2011 recipient	
Army-Baylor Distinguished Alumni Award	Baylor University	2016 recipient	

== Personal life ==
He and his wife Jeannie have two sons and one daughter along with a dog.
