= Eder =

Eder may refer to:

== People ==
- Eder (surname)
- Éder (given name), a Portuguese or Spanish given name
- Éder (footballer, born 1986), Brazilian footballer Éder Citadin Martins
- Eder (footballer, born 1987), Portuguese footballer from Guinea-Bissau Ederzito António Macedo Lopes
- Eder, Josef Maria (born 1855), Austrian chemist who specialised in photography.

== Other uses ==
- Eder (Fulda), a river in western Germany, tributary to the Fulda
- Eder (Eggel), a river in western Germany, tributary to the Eggel
- Eder (finance), a social institution of Ethiopia
