= Edur (surname) =

Edur is a surname. Notable people with the surname include:

- Mark Edur (born 1998), Estonian footballer
- Thomas Edur (born 1969), Estonian ballet dancer
- Tom Edur (born 1954), Estonian-Canadian ice hockey player

== See also ==
- Eder (surname)
