= Journal of Prosthodontics =

- Discipline: Prosthodontics
- Language: English
- Edited by: Radi Masri

Publication details
- History: 1992–present
- Publisher: John Wiley & Sons on behalf of the American College of Prosthodontists (United States)
- Frequency: 9/year
- Impact factor: 5.49 (2024)

Standard abbreviations
- ISO 4: J. Prosthodont.

Indexing
- CODEN: JPORCN
- ISSN: 1532-849X
- OCLC no.: 1043623028

Links
- Journal homepage

The Journal of Prosthodontics is a peer-reviewed medical journal covering prosthodontics and restorative dentistry. It is published by John Wiley & Sons on behalf of the American College of Prosthodontists and the editor-in-chief is Radi Masri (University of Maryland). It is the official publication of the American College of Prosthodontists, the organization of dentists with advanced specialty training who create optimal oral health.

== Abstracting and indexing ==
The journal is abstracted and indexed in Index Medicus/MEDLINE/PubMed and CINAHL.
