= Ann Mroz =

- Website: Times Educational Supplement

Ann Mroz MBE is a British-Polish journalist, former editor of Times Higher Education and former editor and digital publishing director of the TES (Times Educational Supplement).

== Early career ==
Ann Mroz's early career was spent in music journalism and as a freelance writer.

== TES Global ==
Ann Mroz joined the Times Higher Education Supplement in 1994 as a sub-editor. She became chief sub-editor and deputy editor before being appointed editor of THE in May 2008. During her time at the THES, she was instrumental in overseeing the transition of the title from a broadsheet newspaper supplement to a rebranded Times Higher Education magazine.

It was also under Mroz's tenure that the magazine's annual Times Higher Education World University Rankings took the decision to change data supplier from Quacquerelli Symonds to Thomson Reuters. Explaining the decision, taken after the publication of the 2009 rankings, she said that “universities deserve a rigorous, robust and transparent set of rankings – a serious tool for the sector, not just an annual curiosity.” She went on to explain the reason behind the decision to continue to produce rankings without QS’ involvement, saying that: “The responsibility weighs heavy on our shoulders...we feel we have a duty to improve how we compile them.”

In 2011 Times Higher Education was awarded the titles of “Weekly Business Magazine of the Year” and “Media Business Brand of the Year” by the Professional Publishers Association.

Mroz was promoted to digital publishing director of TES Resources in January 2012. During this time, she also helped to transition the Times Educational Supplement in its rebrand, which included the move from a newspaper to a magazine format.

In the TES issue of 9 August 2013, it was announced that the title's current editor, Gerard Kelly, would be stepping down and that Mroz would be his successor. She became editor on 1 September 2013 and held both this title and that of digital publishing director until she left the company in December 2020.

== Education work and honours ==
She is a trustee of the charities Shine, the Institute for Research in Schools, the Academies Enterprise Trust and the Reach Foundation. She is on the education advisory group of the Sutton Trust, the advisory board of the Education Endowment Foundation, the advisory board of the Children's Commissioner and the advisory board of the Education Policy Institute. She is also a member of the Princeton University Press European advisory board.

Mroz was appointed a Member of the Order of the British Empire in the New Year Honours List 2021 for services to education.

She lists her recreations in Who's Who as “riding hobby horses, swimming against the tide, sailing too close to the wind”.
