= SMK (disambiguation) =

SMK can refer to:

- Statens Museum for Kunst, the Danish National Gallery
- SMK tank, a Soviet heavy tank prototype
- Slagsmålsklubben, Swedish band
- Sekolah Menengah Kejuruan, a type of high school in Indonesia
- Super Mario Kart, the first game in Nintendo's Mario Kart series, released in 1992 for the SNES
- Sekolah Menengah Kebangsaan, a type of government owned public schools in Malaysia
- SMK-MKP, a political party in Slovakia
- SMK (dentistry)
- Sam Kee LRT station, Punggol, LRT station abbreviation
- Stowmarket railway station, England, National Rail code
- Smacker video, computer filename extension
- A variant of the SMA coax connector
- Office of the Prime Minister (Norway), Statsministerens kontor (SMK) - a cabinet department
- Sierra MatchKing, a match-grade bullet designed for long range applications
- Sue Monk Kidd, American writer
