= Happy Puzzle Company =

Happy Puzzle is a retailer and manufacturer of "family puzzles and games", with "300 award-winning puzzles, games, challenges and puzzle books". The company is based in Elstree, Hertfordshire.

The company sells its products to the general public, supplies its own products to retailers and offers events. In an article in Times Education Supplement, The Happy Puzzle Company's school puzzle challenge days were described as "developing independent learning skills". The company offers a service aimed at working with children with dyslexia, dyspraxia and those who are gifted and talented, as well as offering programmes for businesses and charities.

Founded in 1992, the company won an award for Business of the Year in 2010. One of the company's products, "The Brain Train", won a 2018 Family Choice Award in the USA. The Happy Puzzle Company is also responsible for bringing The Genius Square, The Genius Star and rest of the games in The Genius Range to the UK and International market.

Jigsaw specialist company, mad4jigsaws is a part of Happy Puzzle.

The Happy Puzzle Company was acquired by SMART NV in May 2022.
