= Ederson =

Ederson is a given name. Notable people with the name include the following footballers:

- Ederson (footballer, born January 1986), Brazilian midfielder born in January 1986 (Lyon, Lazio, Flamengo)
- Ederson (footballer, born March 1986), Brazilian defensive midfielder born in March 1986 (Genk, Charleroi, Asteras Tripoli)
- Éderson (footballer, born 1989), Brazilian striker born in 1989 (Atlético Paranaense, Kashiwa Reysol)
- Ederson (footballer, born 1993), Brazilian goalkeeper born in 1993 (Benfica, Manchester City, Fenerbahçe)
- Éderson (footballer, born 1999), Brazilian defensive midfielder born in 1999 (Desportivo Brasil, Cruzeiro, Atalanta)
- Eder (footballer, born 1989), also known as Ederson Bruno Domingos, Brazilian winger born in 1989 (Yokohama)
- Ederson Fofonka, Brazilian forward born in 1974 (Uruguay, Mexico, Greece)
- Eder (footballer, born 1984), also known as Ederson Trindade Lopes, Brazilian forward born 1984 (Brazil, Japan)
- Nenê Guanxuma (born 1952), full name Éderson José Martins, Brazilian forward

== See also ==
- Éder (given name)
