= Paul S. Wright =

British prosthetic dentist (born 1946)

- Born: Paul S. Wright; 1 May 1946 (age 80)
- Medical career
- Profession: Emeritus Professor
- Field: Dentistry
- Institutions: Barts and The London School of Medicine and Dentistry
- Sub-specialties: Prosthetics
- Research: Removable prosthodontics

Paul S. Wright, (born 1 May 1946) is the emeritus professor in prosthetic dentistry at Barts and The London School of Medicine and Dentistry. He also chair of the General Dental Council's, Specialist Dental Education Board.

He is also consulting editor on the European Journal of Prosthodontics and Restorative Dentistry.

== Education ==
In 1969 Wright graduated from The London Hospital Medical College Dental School.

== Career ==
- 1970 - 2001 General dental practice (part-time)
- 1972 Lecturer, The London Hospital Medical College Dental School
- 1980 Senior lecturer, The London Hospital Medical College Dental School
- 1982 Honorary consultant, The London Hospital Medical College Dental School
- 1992 Founding editor, European Journal of Prosthodontics and Restorative Dentistry
- 1999 - 2007 Dean of dentistry, Barts and The London School of Medicine and Dentistry (formerly The London Hospital Medical College Dental School)
- 2000 Professor of prosthetic dentistry, Barts and The London School of Medicine and Dentistry
- 2000 - 2001 President, British Society for the Study of Prosthetic Dentistry
- 2005 - 2006 President, European Prosthodontic Association
- 2007 - 2008 President, British Society of Gerodontology

== Books ==
- Wright, Paul S; Smith, Bernard GN; Brown, David (1995). The clinical handling of dental materials. Oxford: Wright. ISBN 9780723610236.
