= Mühlenbach (Eggel) =

River in Germany

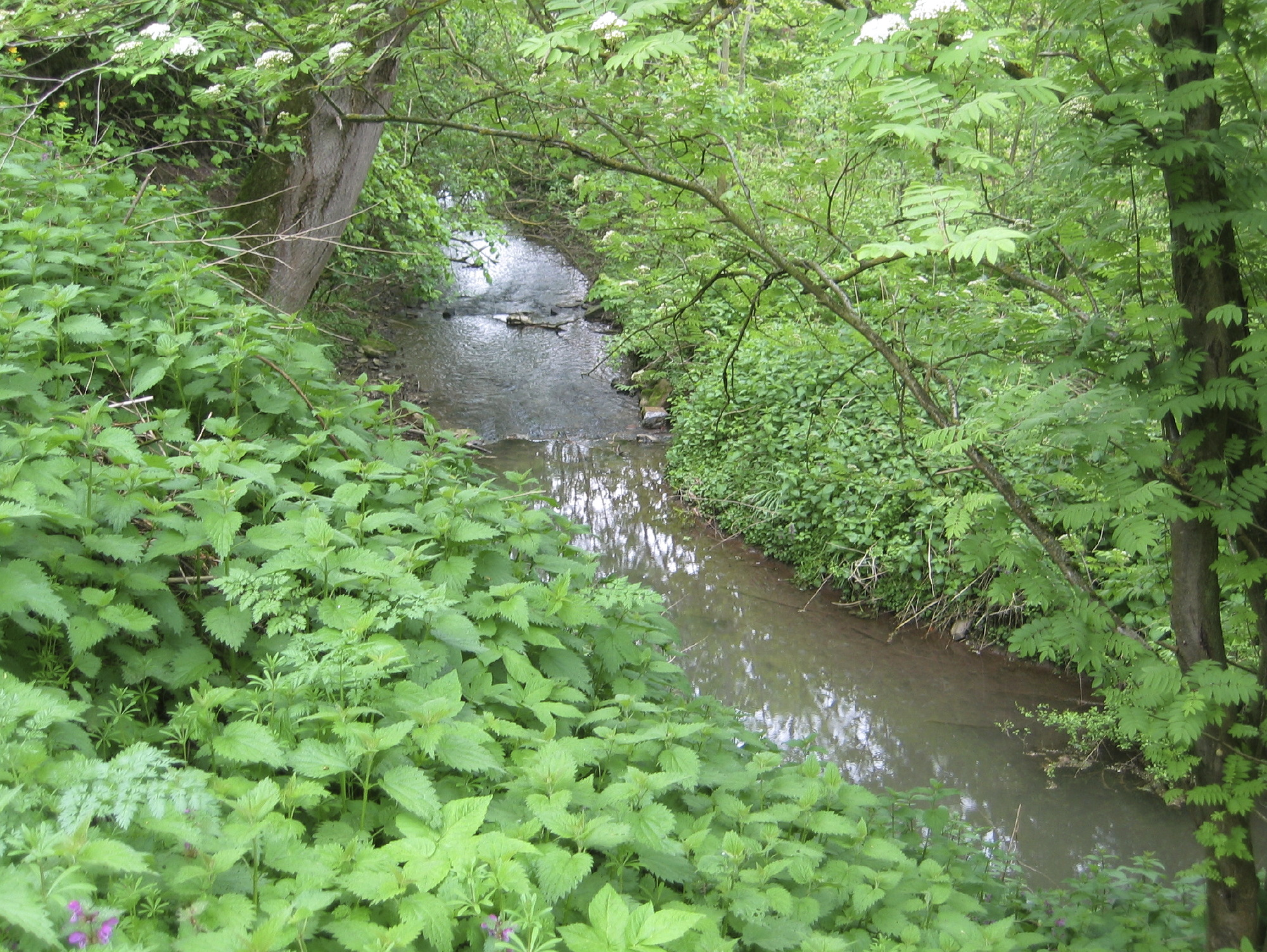

Location
- Country: Germany
- State: North Rhine-Westphalia

Physical characteristics
- Mouth
  - location: Eggel
  - coordinates: 51.5532°N 9.2040°E
- Length: 9.1 km (5.7 mi)

Basin features
- Progression: Eggel→ Diemel→ Weser→ North Sea

Mühlenbach (German pronunciation: [ˈmyːlənbax]) is a river of North Rhine-Westphalia, Germany. It is a left tributary of the Eggel near Borgentreich.

== See also ==
- List of rivers of North Rhine-Westphalia
