= TES India =

Education website

- Website type: Education
- Headquarters: India
- Owner: TES Global
- Website: www.tes.com
- Commercial: Yes
- Registration: Optional (required only for the upload/download of resources)
- Launched: October 11, 2012 (13 years ago)
- Current status: Active

TES India is a free online teaching community where teachers can communicate, share and download worksheets, lesson plans and teaching activities. It launched in October 2012. The website, which is completely free to join and use, has been designed by teachers for teachers.

== About TES Connect ==
TES India was created by TES Connect. TES Connect was launched in April 2006. More than 3.6 million resources are downloaded from the TES website a week, with eight TES resources downloaded a second. TES Connect has more than 2.6 million registered online users in over 275 countries.

== Resources and community ==
Besides resources for kindergarten, primary, secondary and higher secondary, TES India also offers learning materials for whole school and special needs. TES India has 501,371 total resources available that are free to use in the classroom. The 7 million teachers in India can communicate and discuss ideas via the community forums and search for teaching jobs in the major India cities.

== Ownership ==
TES Connect is run by TES Global, which was previously owned by Charterhouse Capital Partners from 2007. TES Global has been owned by the US-based TPG Capital (formerly Texas Pacific Group) global investment company since July 2013.

== See also ==
- Times Educational Supplement
- TES Australia
- Times Higher Education
