= TES Australia =

Education website

- Website type: Education
- Headquarters: New South Wales, Australia
- Owner: TES Connect
- Website: www.tesaustralia.com
- Commercial: Yes
- Registration: Optional (required only for the upload/download of resources)
- Launched: July 11, 2013 (13 years ago)
- Current status: Active

TES Australia is a free teaching resources website with over 565,000 resources. It was launched in July 2013.

== History ==
TES Australia is owned and operated by TES Connect, a supplier of educational teacher exchange resources. TES Connect was launched in April 2006 to provide teachers with a way to share and find resources.

TES Australia was developed and launched in partnership with the Board of Studies, the Australian Education Union and the Centre for Professional Learning New South Wales to offer a free online platform for high-quality teaching resources mapped to the Australian curriculum.

== Resources and Community ==
TES Australia launched with over 565,000 resources arranged by stage, subject and topic. As well as pre-school/early childhood, primary and secondary-level resources, the site also has resources suitable for whole school topics and for children with special educational needs.

Teachers can also get news and information about the Australian Curriculum in a dedicated information centre.

In addition, TES Australia has a community section, where teachers can join groups, discuss topics in forums or write their own blogs

== Ownership ==
TES Connect is run by TES Global, which has been owned by TPG Capital LLP since 2013.

== See also ==
- Times Educational Supplement
- Share My Lesson
- TES India
