= Eder (Eggel) =

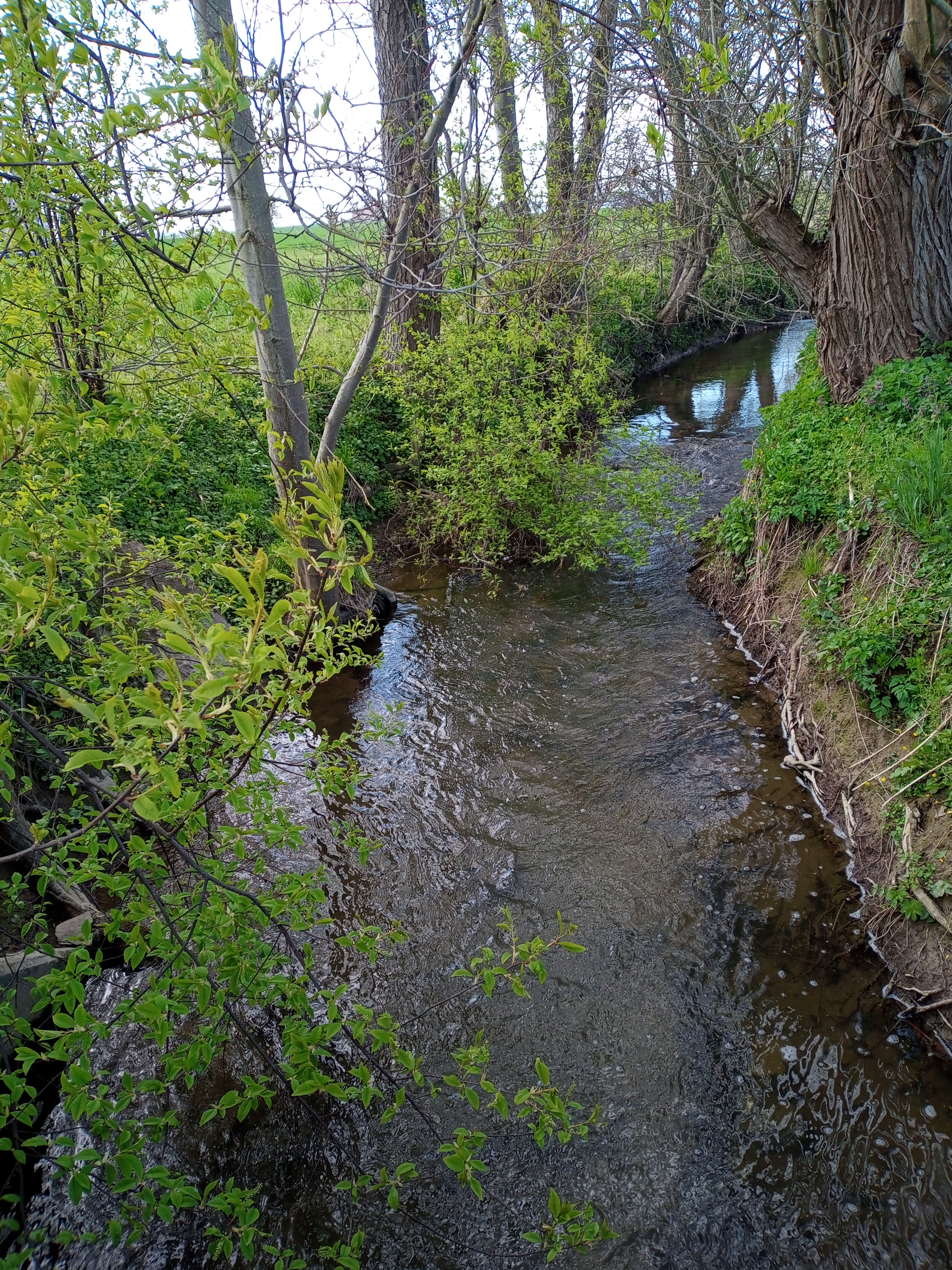

Location
- Country: Germany
- State: North Rhine-Westphalia

Physical characteristics
- Mouth
  - location: Eggel
  - coordinates: 51.5453°N 9.2064°E
- Length: 13.0 km (8.1 mi)

Basin features
- Progression: Eggel→ Diemel→ Weser→ North Sea

The Eder (German pronunciation: [ˈeːdɐ]) is a river of North Rhine-Westphalia, Germany. It is a right tributary of the Eggel, flowing into it not far north of the community of Lütgeneder in the Borgentreich municipality (Höxter district).

== See also ==
- List of rivers of North Rhine-Westphalia
