= Debrett's People of Today =

Biographical reference work

Debrett's People of Today was a reference work published by Debrett's containing biographical details of approximately 25,000 notable people from across the spectrum of British society, a rival to the longer-established Who's Who. Those included were chosen on significance and merit.

In its early years, the series was called Debrett's Distinguished People of Today. The last volume appeared in 2017.

== History ==
Debrett's had previously published a similar work called Debrett's Handbook: Distinguished People in British Life, edited by Charles Mosley, which appeared only in 1982. While this title was not repeated, it formed the foundation for the series called People of Today, created in 1988.

The editors at Debrett's identified over forty sectors of British life for the inclusion of leading figures. Of these, the most highly populated were government, education, law, business, armed forces, diplomacy, charitable work, sports, and the arts. They wished to ensure that those chosen for inclusion would be significant.

Publication was always at the end or beginning of the year, with the year ahead named in the title of the volume, latterly in Roman numerals. Some editions have a New Year Honours list included loosely, not forming part of the book.

An online edition of the work began to appear in July 2009, when a full list of the entries was made available without payment.

The last edition of People of Today was that of 2017, published at the end of 2016. The Guardian noted one year later "By mid-2017, Debrett's People of Today was no more, and the future of the Debrett's 500 in doubt. These, it is worth noting, are the only lists they produce that are based on merit."

== Selection ==
From the first volume in 1988, the selection of people to be featured was made by editorial staff at Debrett's, relying on expert nomination panels. Entries were reviewed with each new edition, to ensure continuing relevance. Short biographies included details of the subject's career, education, family, recreations, membership of clubs, and contact address. The work had a section on styles of address and a list of abbreviations used.

Like its rival Who's Who, the choice of subjects was at the discretion of the publisher, and there was no payment made or any obligation to purchase the book. Whereas entries in Who's Who are continued annually for life, people included in People of Today were removed if they were no longer considered to meet the criteria for inclusion.

While formal titles, such as knighthoods, were included automatically, people chosen for inclusion were asked to decide their preference for other titles, such as Mr, Miss, Mrs or Ms.

== Editions ==
- Debrett's Distinguished People of Today 1988 (1988), ed. David Williamson, Patricia Ellis
- Debrett's Distinguished People of Today 1989 (1989)
- Debrett's Distinguished People of Today 1990, ed. Patricia Ellis
- Debrett's People of Today 1992, ed. Patricia Ellis
- Debrett's People of Today 1995 (1995), ed. Jonathan Parker
- Debrett's People of Today 1998, ed. Jonathan Parker
- Debrett's People of Today 1999, ed. Nick Jotischky, Alistair Graham
- Debrett's People of Today 2000 Millennium Edition, ed. Alison Coles, Antonia Brodie
- Debrett's People of Today 2002 (2001), ed. Sara Foster, Zoe Gullen
- Debrett's People of Today 2004 (2003), ed. Zoe Gullen, Daniel Sefton
- Debrett's People of Today 2005 (2004), ed. Zoe Gullen, Daniel Sefton
- Debrett's People of Today, Anno MMVI (2005), ed. Charles Mosley, Zoe Gullen
- Debrett's People of Today, Anno MMVII (2006), ed. Daniel Sefton
- Debrett's People of Today, Anno MMVIII (2007), ed. Daniel Sefton
- Debrett's People of Today, Anno MMIX (2008), ed. Daniel Sefton
- Debrett's People of Today, Anno MMX (2009)
- Debrett's People of Today Anno MMXI (2010)
- Debrett's People of Today, Anno MMXIII (2012), ed. Laura Winter
- Debrett's People of Today: Anno MMXVI (2015), ed. Lucy Hume, Patrick Roberts
- Debrett's People of Today MMXVII (2016), ed. Lucy Hume, with foreword by Karen Blackett
