= British Society for Restorative Dentistry =

The British Society for Restorative Dentistry was founded in 1968 and promotes standards in the dental profession through conferences, meetings and scientific literature. The society provides a forum for members to debate current issues in Restorative Dentistry and especially in Prosthodontics.

== Activities ==
The conference calendar includes two scientific meetings a year (Spring and Autumn). The society is affiliated to the European Journal of Prosthodontics and Restorative Dentistry, and has also published policy documents on ‘Guidelines for Crown and Bridge’ and ‘A Strategy for Planning Restorative Care’.

== Award winners ==
The British Society for Restorative Dentistry (BSRD) award prizes to clinicians and researchers in three broad domains; audits, research and clinical cases.

Award Winner	Category	Title	Year
Dr Vikas Prinja	Clinical	Multidisciplinary Treatment of a Patient with Hypodontia: Utilising Multiple Approaches for Space Management.	2019
Dr Francesca Tosson	Audit	An Audit to determine patient understanding of Obstructive Sleep Apnoea attending a Restorative Consultant Clinic providing Mandibular Repositioning Appliances at Guys Hospital.	2018
Dr Stephanie Hackett	Clinical	A conservative direct approach for the management of a Hypoplastic Amelogenesis Imperfecta patient.	2018
Dr Richard Michael	Clinical	A minimally invasive approach to the restoration of tooth surface loss and neglected dentition, including anterior digital smile design. A case study.	2018
Dr Sandeep Johal	Clinical	The conundrum of managing a compromised dentition.	2017
Dr Angharad Truman	Clinical	Improving function and aesthetics of a hypodontia patient.	2017
Dr Morteza Mazinanian	Research	An In-Vitro Study on the Effect of 5% and 16% Carbamide Peroxide on the Organic Content of Enamel.	2017
Dr Sumeet Champaneri	Clinical	A Conservative Approach to the Management of Severe Tooth Wear.	2017
Dr Garima Charan	Audit	Analysis Of Implant Referrals to an NHS Teaching Hospital.	2017
Dr Sahil Patel	Clinical	Treatment Planning and Dental Rehabilitation of an Orthodontically Compromised and Neglected Dentition: A Clinical Case.	2016

== See also ==
- Defence Dental Service
- Dental Professionals Association
