= Éder =

Éder (Brazilian Portuguese: [ˈɛdɛʁ], Spanish pronunciation: [ˈeðeɾ]) is a Portuguese and Spanish given name. Notable people with the name include:

- Éder Aleixo (born 1957), Brazilian international footballer featured in 1982 World Cup
- Eder Aller (born 2007), Spanish football goalkeeper
- Éder (footballer, born 1986), Brazilian-born Italian footballer, full name Éder Citadin Martins
- Éder Gaúcho (born 1977), Brazilian football defender
- Éder Bonfim (born 1981), Brazilian footballer
- Éder Monteiro (born 1983), Brazilian footballer
- Éder Lima (footballer, born 1987), Brazilian footballer
- Eder (footballer, born 1987), Ederzito António Macedo Lopes, Portuguese footballer
- Éder (footballer, born 1988), Edson Correia de Araujo, Brazilian football defensive midfielder
- Éder (footballer, born 1995), Éder Ferreira Graminho, Brazilian footballer
- Éder Militão (born 1998), Brazilian footballer

== See also ==
- Eder (disambiguation)
- Ederson (disambiguation)
