= Dental Professionals Association =

DPA
- Dental Professionals Association
- Founded: 1954
- Headquarters: London, UK
- Location: United Kingdom
- Members: 2,500 (2009)
- Key people: Jim Donaldson BDS (President), Brian Levy BDS (Chairman), Derek Watson BDS (CEO)
- Affiliations: Independent
- Website: www.uk-dentistry.org
- Last updated 9 March 2009

The Dental Professionals Association, previously known as the Dental Practitioners Association and the General Dental Practitioners Association, is a trade union for professionals involved in primary dental care in the United Kingdom. It is based in Harley Street in London.

== History ==
In 1952 and also on 9 November 1953 a group of dentists comprising Mr N L Newman BDS, Dr Malik, Mr Herbert Murray, Mr Peter Glazebrook, Mr Jonas and others met in East London. In 1954 they formed the General Dental Practitioners Association in response to a perceived failure of the British Dental Association to lobby aggressively on behalf of general dental practitioners who had joined the National Health Service at its inception in 1948 only to see the first NHS patient charges imposed on dentures and successive cuts in dental fees.

The associate met in London in those early days, often at dental supply houses. Members included Mr Combiere, qualified in law, Herbert Murray the first treasurer, Frank Barlow, Hans Orlay (a pioneer of implants with titanium), Sidney Smith and Ian Simpson (the first GDPA member of the General Dental Council).

Alan d'Arcy Fearn became President of both the GDPA and the BDA and the longest ever serving member of the GDC (35 years).

== Structure ==
Until 2009 membership of the DPA was restricted to dentists in high-street practice. On 19 November 2009 it announced that membership would be opened to all dental care professionals registered with the General Dental Council or having an interest in primary dental care. Membership of the Association was expanded to include dental nurses, hygienists, therapists, technicians and the dental trade.

As a trade union the DPA is subject to the full provisions of the Trade Union and Labour Relations (Consolidation) Act 1992 as amended, and must hold elections for the chairman and secretary and for membership of its principal executive committee, the council.

== Activity ==
The DPA's aims, contained in the Rules, are to represent members in the UK, to maintain the status of the profession, to improve its members' terms and conditions and to assist and provide services for members. It provides a podcast relevant to dentistry in the UK. Benefits include contracts and the industry-standard Private Fees and Wages Guide which is compiled from a survey of private fees charged by members.

The DPA maintains contacts with government and others that enable it to provide a briefing service to help members reduce their business risk in the UK dental market. It also actively considers alternative dental treatment provision systems with the objective of promoting oral health in the UK. It gives evidence annually to the Review Body on Doctors and Dentists Remuneration on dentists' terms and conditions.

== Magazine ==
Members receive a bimonthly magazine the GDP (formerly the General Dental Practitioner, formerly The Probe) (Identifier: ISSN 0954-4186; BNB:GB8958084). This began as a newsletter in 1954 and was turned by Sol Chandler, an experienced Fleet Street journalist into a magazine, The Probe, in 1958. Ken Brown took over as Editor in 1964. In 1968 a contract was signed with Bouverie Press which saw the magazine expand to 56 pages in 1973. The magazine was purchased by Ken Brown in 1982. When the Probe name was sold to an independent publisher the GDPA magazine was relaunched as the General Dental Practitioner. The title was later abbreviated to the GDP with effect from vol. 8, no. 6 (July/Aug. 1996).
