= Mari K. Eder =

U.S. Army officer

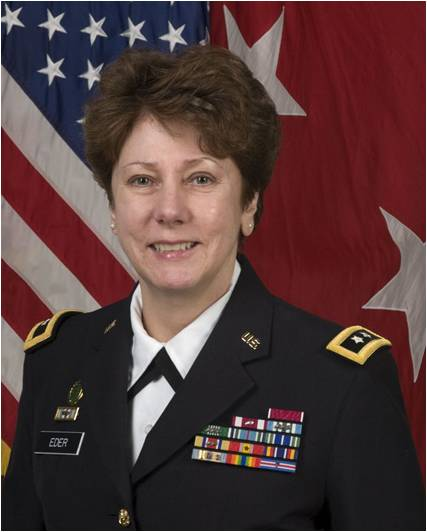
- Born: Grove City, Pennsylvania
- Military career
- Allegiance: United States
- Branch: United States Army
- Service years: 1977–2012
- Rank: Major General
- Commands: United States Army Reserve Joint and Special Troops Support Command
- Awards: Army Distinguished Service Medal; Legion of Merit (2)

Mari K. Eder is a retired major general of the United States Army. She served as the Deputy Chief of the United States Army Reserve and Deputy Chief of United States Army Public Affairs, prior to be appointed Commanding General of the United States Army Reserve Joint and Special Troops Support Command (redesignated as the 76th Operational Reserve Command in 2013) in October 2009. She retired from the army in 2013.

== Early life and education ==
A native of Grove City, Pennsylvania, Eder graduated from Edinboro University of Pennsylvania with a Bachelor of Arts in English in 1975 and a Master of Arts in English in 1976. Eder entered the United States Army in 1977, and, after receiving her commission as a second lieutenant in the Signal Corps, she served at Fort McClellan, Alabama and then Fort George G. Meade, Maryland until leaving active duty in September 1982 and transitioning to the Army Reserve.

Eder's military education includes the Signal Officer Basic Course, the Military Police and Military Intelligence Officer Advanced Courses, the Public Affairs Officer Course, the Command and General Staff College, and the Army War College. She holds bachelor's and master's degrees in English from Edinboro University of Pennsylvania and a master's degree of strategic studies from the United States Army War College. She is also a graduate of Senior Executive and leadership programs at the National Defense University and the Army War College. She is also a graduate of the advanced program in mass communications at the University of South Carolina and completed the Training with Industry Fellowship with Fleishman-Hilliard Public Relations in Washington, DC. She is an experienced speaker and guest lecturer and has served as an adjunct professor at the George C. Marshall European Center for Security Studies, the NATO School, and Sweden's International Security Command. Eder received a Doctor of Humane Letters (honors causa) from Edinboro University of Pennsylvania on December 14, 2013.

== Career ==
Eder served over 36 years in the army, inclusive of both Active and Army Reserve service. Eder commanded at the company, battalion, brigade and division level. Her previous assignments include the United States Army's Deputy Chief of Public Affairs, commander of the 6th Brigade (Professional Development), 80th Division (Institutional Training) while concurrently serving on active duty as the Chief of Staff with the Reserve Forces Policy Board (RFPB) in the Office of the Secretary of Defense. Eder had additional joint experience, serving with the United States European Command in Stuttgart, Germany where she was assigned as the Deputy Director of Public Affairs.

Eder was named an Honorary Member of the United States Army Judge Advocate General Corps in 2011. She was named to the Communications Hall of Fame at Edinboro University of PA in 2013 and inducted into the Army Public Affairs Hall of Fame in 2017 and became the fourth recipient of the Joe Galloway Lifetime Achievement Award. Now in her second term as Trustee with the United States Army War College Foundation, she was elected to the Executive Committee in March, 2017 and is Board Secretary.

== Personal life ==
As a civilian, Eder was the Director of Public Affairs at the George C. Marshall European Center for Security Studies in Garmisch-Partenkirchen, Germany. She has been an adjunct professor and lecturer at the NATO School, Sweden's International Security Command and at Norway's military Command and Staff Centre.

== Awards and decorations ==
Eder's awards and decorations include the Army Distinguished Service Medal, Legion of Merit with oak leaf cluster, the Meritorious Service Medal with silver oak leaf cluster, the Joint Service Commendation Medal with three oak leaf cluster, the Army Commendation Medal with three oak leaf clusters, the Joint Service Achievement Medal, the Army Achievement Medal, the Office of the Secretary of Defense Identification Badge, and the Army Staff Identification Badge.

Eder received the Vatican award of the Knight Grand Cross of the Order of Saint Gregory the Great from Pope Benedict XVI in 2011.
