= Mark Edur =

Estonian footballer

Personal information
- Date of birth: 11 December 1998 (age 27)
- Place of birth: Tallinn, Estonia
- Height: 1.80 m (5 ft 11 in)
- Position: Defender

Youth career
- Levadia

Senior career*
Years	Team	Apps	(Gls)
2017–2018	Levadia-2	54	(1)
2019–2020	Viljandi Tulevik	47	(0)
2020	Etar	3	(0)
2021	Nõmme Kalju	0	(0)
2022–2024	Belper Town		
2024-	Balga SC		
- * Club domestic league appearances and goals

Mark Edur (born 11 December 1998) is an Estonian footballer who plays as a defender for Balga Soccer Club.

== Career ==
Before the 2019 season, Edur signed for Estonian top flight side Viljandi Tulevik from Levadia-2 in the Estonian second division.

In 2020, he signed for Bulgarian club Etar. He spent that season with the club before leaving in 2021.

He moved to Belper Town in March 2022.
