= Tes (magazine) =

UK trade publication

Times Educational Supplement
- Type: Weekly trade magazine
- Format: Compact
- Owner: Providence Equity Partners
- Publisher: TES Global
- Editor: Jon Severs
- Founded: 1910; 116 years ago
- Headquarters: London
- Circulation: 58,007 (2014)
- ISSN: 0040-7887
- Website: www.tes.com

Tes, formerly known as the Times Educational Supplement, is a British weekly trade magazine aimed at education professionals. It was first published in 1910 as a pull-out supplement in The Times newspaper. Such was its popularity that in 1914, the supplement became a separate publication selling for one penny.

Tes focuses on school-related news and features. It covered higher education until the Times Higher Education Supplement (now Times Higher Education) was launched as a sister publication in 1971. Today its editor is Jon Severs. Since 1964, an alternative version of the publication, Tess, has been produced for Scotland. An edition for Wales, Tes Cymru, was also published between 2004 and 2011. The lack of content about Wales since its closure has been criticised by the Welsh Education Minister, Jeremy Miles. All are produced by London-based company Tes Global, which has been owned by US investment firm Providence Equity Partners LLC since 2018. The Tes no longer has a connection with The Times newspaper. Times Higher Education was sold in 2018 and is now a separate business to Tes Global.

Tes is published weekly on Fridays, at a cover price of £3.50. Data from the National Readership Survey Jan–Dec 2012 suggested that the average yearly readership was around 362,000, of which around 90 percent were in the ABC1 category. In addition to the magazine, Tes runs a popular website featuring breaking education news and comment, teaching jobs, forums, and classroom resources that are uploaded by teachers.

== History ==
The idea for a regular section on education in The Times was first proposed in 1905 by J E G de Montmorency, a barrister and writer who later composed leader articles for The TES. The first issue of the monthly educational supplement appeared on 6 September 1910, opening with a witty weather forecast for the UK's school systems. King George V had recently begun his reign, and the paper noted that "some great resettlement of the English school system seems likely to take place".

Over its first decade, The TES established itself as a paper for teachers, though it was primarily aimed at those in private and grammar schools. However, it pressed for education reform from its early years, calling in 1913 for "Secondary Education for All".

In 1914, The TES became a stand-alone publication, noting on the outbreak of the First World War that "every great war in the modern world has been followed by changes in education". Two years afterwards, while the war still raged, the paper began to be published weekly. The TES later explained that "the decision to change into a weekly periodical was taken to lend the support of The Times more effectively to the movement for reform in education which culminated in the Fisher Reform Act of 1918".

Notable editors of The TES included George Sydney Freeman, who was editor for its first 28 years and Harold Dent, a progressive former schoolteacher who became acting editor in 1940. He put the newspaper together practically single-handedly during the Blitz. His editorials pressed for "total reform" of the education system, "based on a new conception of the place, status and function of education in a democratic State, not a patching and padding of the present system". This attitude chimed with the radical thinking then going on within the Board of Education. Mr. Dent had regular meetings with its president, Rab Butler, in the years building up to the Education Act 1944.

The readership of The TES, once primarily private and grammar school teachers, broadened during the 20th century. During the 1970s, the paper became more supportive of Comprehensive schools, when it had once defended grammars.

In the 1980s, it became increasingly concerned that political reforms might overload or restrict teachers, particularly the launch of the national curriculum and league tables with the Education Reform Act 1988. Its then editor, Stuart Maclure, noted in 1985 that "the irony of the last 10 years, in which the politicians and industrialists have clamoured for reform and accused the educationists of blocking it, was not lost on anyone who cares to look back".

When the newspaper reached its centenary in 2010, its former editor Gerard Kelly, wrote: "If there is one phenomenal, outstanding, amazing development of the past century in this country, it has to be that education has liberated women in a way that was never anticipated by the most liberal of reformers, even by those far-sighted individuals on The TES in 1910."

In September 2011, TES changed from a newspaper to being printed as a magazine.

== Ownership ==
At its start, TES was owned, like its parent paper, by Lord Northcliffe. After his death in 1922, the newspapers were sold to the Astor family, and it was sold on again in 1966 to the Canadian newspaper tycoon Roy Thomson.

Rupert Murdoch took ownership of the newspaper in 1981. Murdoch's News International restructured its newspapers to set up "Times Supplements Limited" and by 1999, this became "TSL Education Ltd", which also published THE and Nursery World. In October 2005, the group was sold to Exponent, a private equity group, who in turn sold it to Charterhouse in May 2007.

TES online is run by the London-based "TES Global", which claims to be "The largest network of teachers in the world", and has been owned by the US-based Providence Equity Partners global investment company since December 2018

== Past staff and contributors ==
Staff journalists at TES have included Simon Jenkins, who became editor of the Evening Standard and The Times; novelist, literary historian, and biographer Valerie Grosvenor Myer; and Timothy Mo and Frances Hill, who both became novelists.

The newspaper's columnists have included Ted Wragg, Caitlin Moran and Libby Purves. The pop singer Daniel Bedingfield was employed to work on the newspaper's website.

External contributors have included Gordon Brown, who contributed comment articles to the Scottish edition of TES as a young lecturer in 1979. A competition for writing by pupils in 1980 was won by Sacha Baron Cohen, then eight years old.

=== Editors ===
- 1910–1938: George Sydney Freeman
- 1938–1940: Donald McLachlan
- 1940–1952: Harold Dent
- 1952–1969: Walter James
- 1969–1989: Stuart Maclure
- 1989–1997: Patricia Rowan
- 1997–2000: Caroline St John-Brooks
- 2000–2005: Bob Doe
- 2005–2007: Judith Judd
- 2007: Wendy Berliner (acting)
- 2008: Karen Dempsey
- 2008–2013: Gerard Kelly
- 2013–2020: Ann Mroz
- 2021–present: Jon Severs

== Tes Global ==
Tes first established a website in 1997, when it briefly experimented with a paywall.

It was revamped after the newspaper's relaunch in 2007 and is now split into distinct sections, including "School Solutions", "Jobs", "Teaching resources" and "School portal". "Jobs" is home to all the vacancies listed in the TES magazine and is updated daily. "School solutions" includes various software products that Tes offers to schools and teachers.

Over 13 million educators are members of the site and use it regularly.

The Resources section is a platform for teachers to share original classroom resources, including lesson plans, PowerPoint presentations, interactive whiteboard resources, worksheets, and activities. As of May 2017, there have been over 1 billion downloads of classroom resources from the Tes platform.

In February 2015, Tes Global launched an open marketplace, which allowed teachers to buy and sell teaching resources.

The Tes portal is now home to "the world's largest online community of teachers", with more than 13 million registered users.

In 2012, PPA (Professional Publishers Association) awarded the Tes website the digital product of the year for the 3rd year in a row and Tes magazine was named Business Magazine of 2012.

== Software and services offered ==
In 2015, Tes bought Hibernia College UK, at the time the largest provider of subject knowledge enhancement courses in England. This later became Tes Institute, which offers routes into teaching as well as safeguarding and training courses for teachers.

Tes products include Class Charts, a classroom seating plan and behaviour management tool, and Provision Map, software that schools used to manage special educational needs. These products were produced by Edukey, before that company was bought by Tes in 2016. They had previously won the best company award at the 2009 Bett Awards.

In 2019, Tes purchased Australian school timetabling business Edval. Edval was named as a top education service provider in Australia in 2021.

In 2021, Tes bought Glasgow based SchoolCloud, the company behind software that runs parents’ evening software used by over 8,000 schools. A BBC report on the software suggested that Covid restrictions were leading more schools to run virtual parents' evenings using SchoolCloud software. In March 2023 the Glasgow office was closed and the remaining SchoolCloud staff made redundant as TES centralised roles in its Sheffield and Fishguard offices.

== Awards ==
First held in 2009, the Tes Schools Awards are held annually to celebrate achievements by schools in the UK. Categories include a school of the year for primary, secondary, specialist provision, and early years, as well as best use of technology, and excellence in creative arts. In 2024, there were 22 categories.

The Tes Schools Awards are judged by a panel of independent education experts from across the UK who are education leaders, headteachers, and researchers.

From 2012 to 2021, Tes hosted the Independent School Awards, which has since been combined into the TES Schools Awards via new categories. From 2011 to 2020, Tes also hosted the FE Awards, aimed at the further education sector.

The Tes Schools Awards are announced at a live formal event in London. Typically hosted by public figures and comedians, hosts have included Alex Horne and The Horne Section in 2024, Dara Ó Briain in 2016, and Greg Davies in 2015.

In 2024, Tes launched and hosted the Tes Awards for International Schools, aimed at British curriculum and International Baccalaureate schools outside the UK. The winners were announced via livestream on 25 April 2024.

== See also ==
- Times Higher Education World University Rankings
