= Markus Eder =

Italian freestyle skier (born 1990)

Markus Eder (born 30 November 1990 in Bruneck) is an Italian freestyle skier. He was a participant at the 2014 Winter Olympics in Sochi.
