= United States Army Dental Command =

Major subordinate command of the U.S. Army Medical Command

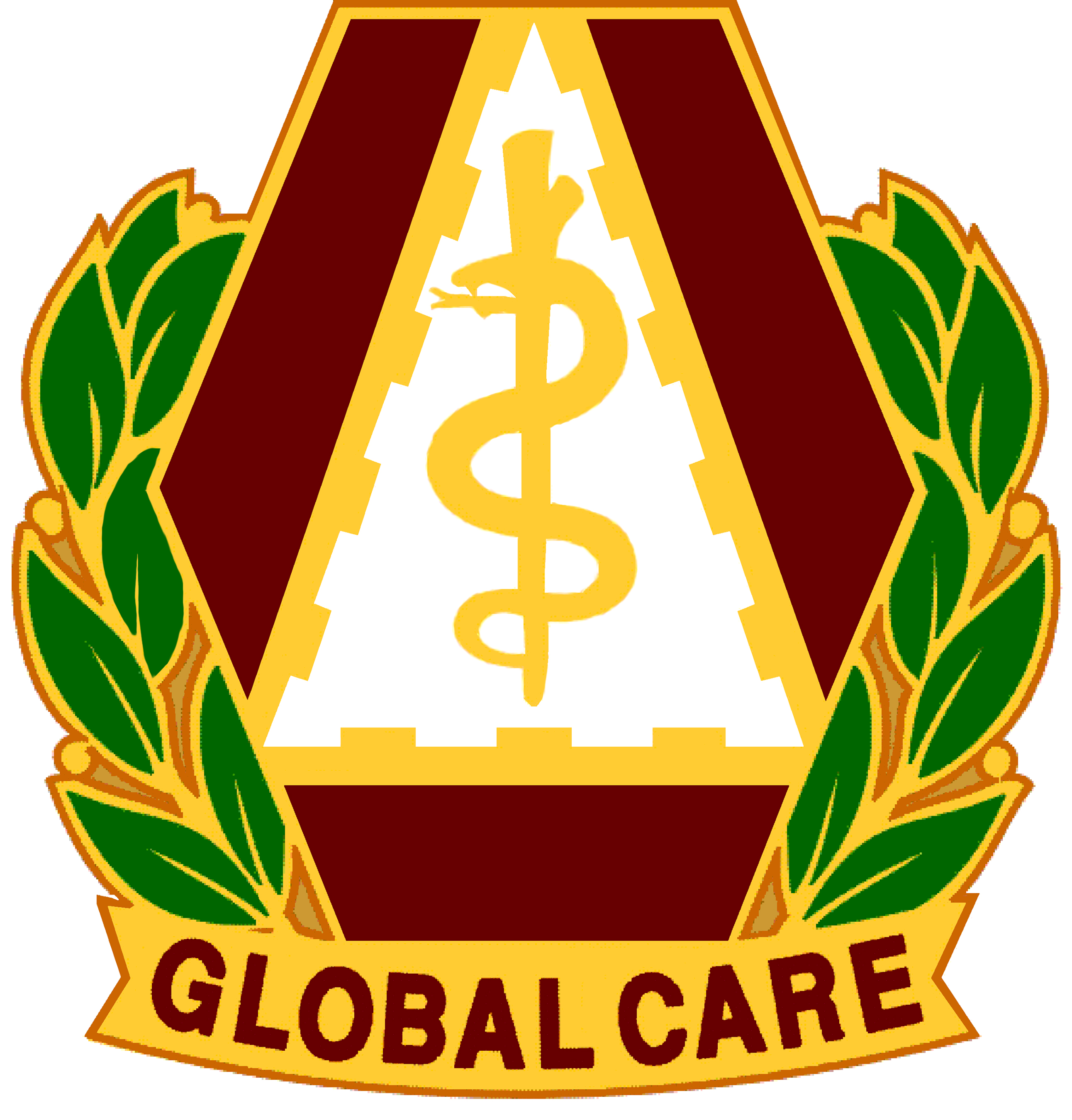
Distinctive unit insignia for US Army Dental Command

The U.S. Army Dental Command, also known as DENCOM, is a major subordinate command of the U.S. Army Medical Command that provides command and control of the Army's fixed-facility dental treatment facilities, preventive care, dental research, development and training institutions, dental treatment to ensure the oral health and readiness of the force, a trained dental force for worldwide deployment, and structures for evolving missions of the Army.

== Structure ==
The DENCOM headquarters are located at Fort Sam Houston, Texas—also the location of MEDCOM's headquarters. DENCOM is divided into regional dental commands and the Army Dental Laboratory that oversee day-to-day operations in military treatment facilities, exercising command and control over the medical treatment facilities in their regions. Generally, these RDC's geographically overlap with their corresponding regional medical commands. There are five regional commands: Europe Regional Dental Command, Northern Regional Dental Command, Pacific Regional Dental Command, Southern Regional Dental Command, and Western Regional Dental Command.

== History ==
While U.S. Army dentistry dates back to 1872 and the first dental corps was established in World War I by Douglas Eads Foster. the creation of DENCOM is relatively recent. Provisionally activated on November 1, 1993, it established Army dental service delivery under a dental command with worldwide authority over all TDA dental units. Subordinate to the DENCOM were eight dental service support areas (DSSA). These DSSAs were later reorganized into what are now known as regional dental commands.
