= Bernard Eder =

English Barrister and former High Court Judge

Sir Henry Bernard Eder (born 16 October 1952) is an English barrister and a former High Court Judge from 2011 to 2015.

== Early life and education ==
Eder was born in Malta and came to England in 1958. He was educated at The Haberdashers' Aske's Boys' School and Downing College at the University of Cambridge (BA, 1974). He is the older brother of Andrew Eder.

== Legal career ==
Eder was called to the bar at Inner Temple in 1975 and became a member of 4 Essex Court (thereafter renamed Essex Court Chambers) specialising in commercial litigation and international arbitration.

He was appointed a QC in 1990, recorder from 2000 to 2001, and judge of the High Court of Justice of England and Wales (Queen's Bench Division) in 2011 where he regularly sat in the Commercial Court and also from time to time in the Queen's Bench Division, the Administrative Court and in the Court of Appeal Criminal Division until his resignation on 1 April 2015. On 7 May 2015, Eder was appointed a non-permanent International Judge at the Singapore International Commercial Court, where he continues to sit from time to time. In June 2016, he was appointed as a temporary Acting Judge in the Eastern Caribbean Supreme Court assigned to the Commercial Division in the British Virgin Islands. He regularly delivers lectures/speeches in the UK and in other parts of the world.

He was formerly Visiting Professor at University College London (1999–2003) where he gave a series of lectures on shipping law. He has also given lectures at other universities around the world including Panthéon Assas Paris 2 and Southampton University.

He was the previous Senior Editor of Scrutton on Charterparties and Bills of Lading.

He is now an international arbitrator based at Newmans Row, 1 Paternoster Lane, London. A full CV and contact details appear at www.bernardeder.com
