= SMK (dentistry) =

Technique used in dentistry

In dentistry, SMK, short for System kompozytowy most (in Polish) ("Composite Bridge System"), is an adhesive restorative prosthodontic technique, developed in Poland during the 1990s. Using the SMK method, a prosthetic tooth is constructed and fitted without damage to the neighbouring teeth.

== Description of method ==
In the SMK method, the dentist models and shapes a tooth from composite materials and fits it in the interdental gap to be filled. In some cases a porcelain veneer is then placed on the new tooth to give it a more natural look. The tooth is attached to the neighbouring teeth also with composite materials. In 2011 over 1000 SMK treatments were performed, (Note: Data obtained by the author during medical research, consultations with orthodontists and performing SMK treatment on patients by the author of the method.) mostly on the lateral incisors.

The main advantage of this method is that there is no grinding of neighbouring teeth, so that the neighbouring teeth are not damaged. This means that the patient can at any time revert to their natural teeth. This method can also be used in situations where other techniques are not applicable: for example, if there is not enough bone and implants cannot be inserted, or the grinding and damaging of neighbouring teeth for a normal dental bridge is not accepted by the patient, or the cost of alternative treatments is too high for the patient. The dentist makes the tooth in the surgery (a dental technician is not needed), and the treatment is completed in approximately two hours.

== History ==
In 1992, the first SMK treatment was performed in the Orthodontic Department of the Pomeranian Medical School in Szczecin, Poland, by C. Turostowski. At the beginning it was treated as a temporary solution. However, after seven years, due to continuing research the SMK method became increasingly used as a permanent option. In June 1999, Turostowski completed his Ph.D., "SMK – composite bridge of own construction applied in the rebuilding of lateral incisors".

Initially, SMK treatment was applied with orthodontic patients with missing lateral incisors. Later, it was applied to patients with other missing teeth, especially premolars. In some cases SMK was used together with veneers so as to give it a more cosmetic and natural look. Shortly afterwards SMK was introduced for use not only with orthodontics patients but also with other dental patients. In 2003 many dental courses for dentists and dental workshops at medical schools and orthodontics departments were organised around Poland.

Different variations of the SMK method have been developed.

== Sources ==
- Turostowski, Cezary (1995). "Przemodelowanie zębów przednich masą kompozytową". Czasopismo Stomatologiczne (XLVII ed.). Poland: Polskie Towarzystwo Stomatologiczne: 201–205. ISSN 0011-4553.
- "Intraoraldirekt hergestellte Kunststofbrucken - Ein Erfarungsbericht". Quintessenz Kieferorthopadie (in German). 17. Jahrgang. 2003. ISSN 0945-7917.
- Aluchna, Marcin; Beata Bujnowska - Aluchna (2008). "Mosty protetyczne z materiałów złożonych wzmocnionych włóknem szklanym". Magazyn Stomatologiczny. 9. Warszawa. ISSN 1230-0888.
