= Quintessence International Publishing Group =

- Industry: Publishing
- Founded: 1949; 76 years ago in Berlin, Germany
- Website: quintpub.com

Quintessence International Publishing Group, or Quintessence Publishing, is a publishing company that produces scientific materials, like books and academic journals, pertaining to dentistry.

It was founded in 1949 in Berlin, Germany, and initially only published German-language books and journals. Their first English-language journal, Quintessence International, was founded in 1969, and the company opened its first United States office in Chicago in 1973. Early in the company's history, it was led by Walter Haase; in 1969, he handed over control of the business to his son, Horst-Wolfgang Haase, who still helps run the company along with his son, Christian Haase.
