= Nenê Guanxuma =

Brazilian footballer

Personal information
- Full name: Éderson José Martins
- Date of birth: 9 October 1952 (age 74)
- Place of birth: Botucatu, Brazil
- Height: 1.67 m (5 ft 6 in)
- Position: Forward

Youth career
- Ferroviária (Botucatu)

Senior career*
Years	Team	Apps	(Gls)
1970–1973	Guarani		
1974	Botafogo-SP		
1975	Grêmio	69	(8)
1976	Atlético Paranaense		
1977–1979	Londrina		
1980	Vasco da Gama		
1980–1983	São José-SP		
1984	Operário-MS		
1985	Ferroviária		
1986	Bahia		
1987	Juventus-SP		
1988	Comercial-MS		
1989	Marília		

Managerial career
- 1991: XV de Jaú
- * Club domestic league appearances and goals as of 10 February 2024

Éderson José Martins (born 9 October 1952), better known as Nenê Guanxuma, is a Brazilian former professional footballer who played as a forward.

== Career ==
A striker with a great sense of positioning that compensated for his short stature, Nenê Guanxuma played for several clubs throughout Brazil, most notably for São José, champion of the second division of São Paulo in 1980 and for Bahia, state champion in 1986. After retiring, he graduated in physical education, in addition to working as a tailor.

== Personal life ==
His father, Guanxuma, was also a footballer who played for SE Palmeiras.

== Honours ==
São José

- Campeonato Paulista Série A2: 1980

Bahia

- Campeonato Baiano: 1986
