= Hans Eder =

Hans Eder may refer to:

- Hans Eder (Transylvanian Saxon artist) (1883–1955), painter and graphic artist
- Hans Eder (skier) (1927–2008), Austrian Nordic skier who competed during the 1950s
- Hans Eder (footballer) (1934–2022), German football player and manager
