= Charles Mosley (genealogist) =

British genealogist (1948–2013)

Charles Mosley FRSA
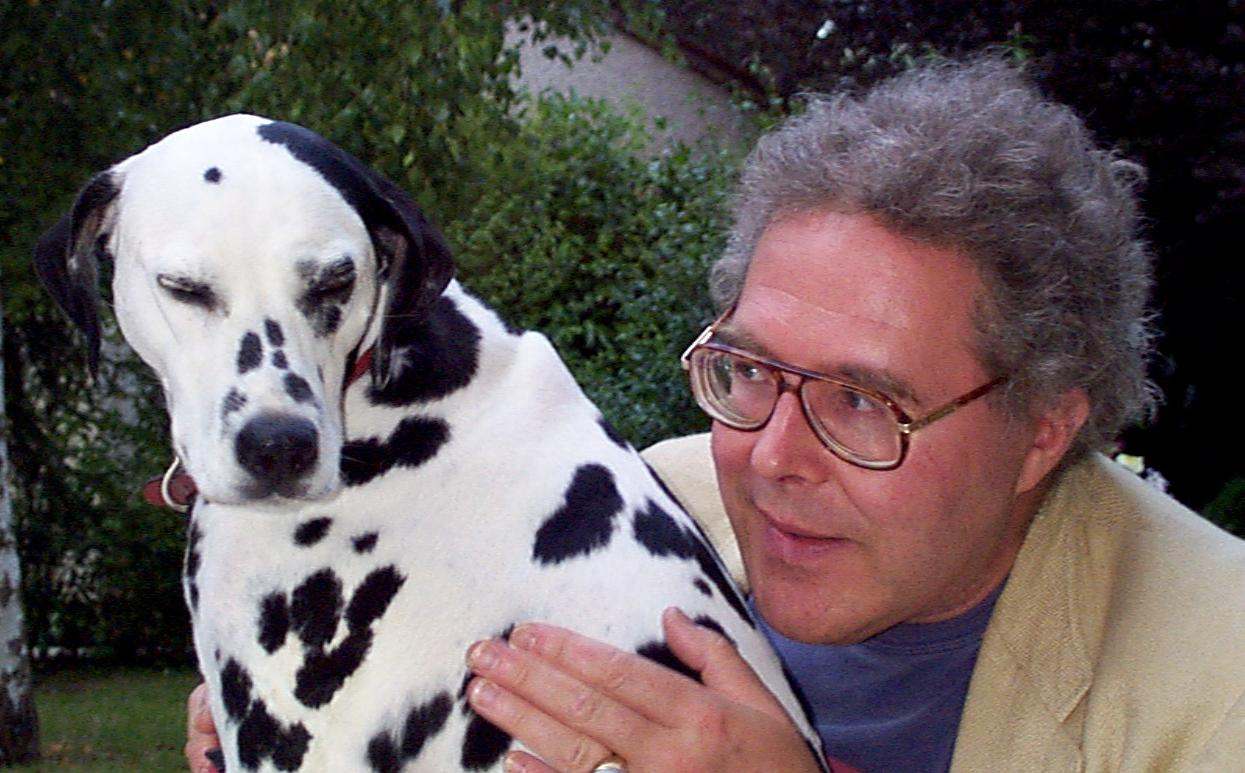
- Charles Mosley with his dog Fleur
- Born: Charles Gordon Mosley; 14 September 1948; London, England
- Died: 5 November 2013 (aged 65); Stoke Mandeville, England
- Education: Eton and Cambridge
- Alma mater: King's College, Cambridge
- Occupations: Editor, author, broadcaster, publisher
- Known for: Genealogy

Charles Gordon Mosley (14 September 1948 – 5 November 2013) was a British genealogist who specialised in British nobility. He was an author, broadcaster, editor, and publisher, best known for having been Editor-in-Chief of Burke's Peerage & Baronetage (106th edition)—its first update since 1970—and of the re-titled 107th edition, Burke's Peerage, Baronetage & Knightage (2003).

== Biography ==
Mosley was born in West London, the son of (George) Gordon Mosley (1918–1993) and Christine Daisy Ord, daughter of Lt-Col Roy Dowland of the Indian Civil Service. Gordon Mosley was with the BBC from 1947 to 1965, working at various times as assistant to Harman Grisewood, as BBC representative at Delhi, and as head of overseas talks and features. Mosley's only sibling, Frances, worked in primary mathematics education, and is the creator of many successful mathematical games.

He grew up in Wraysbury, Berkshire, and attended Eton College from 1962 to 1967, having been elected a King's Scholar. He attended King's College, Cambridge, from 1967 to 1970, and graduated with a degree in English Literature, Philosophy and History. He served in the Foreign & Commonwealth Office, and lived in Italy, Ireland, and France. From 2008 to 2010 Mosley was a Fellow of the Royal Society for the encouragement of Arts, Manufactures & Commerce.

== Career ==
Mosley had a long career as an editor, becoming known as an expert on genealogy and royal families. Mosley began his career as a supply teacher in East Sussex from 1970 to 1971. Mosley then worked on the editorial staff of the Encyclopædia Britannica from 1971 to 1973 as a sub-editor and a librarian. From 1974 to 1977, Mosley served in the Information Research Department of the British Foreign & Commonwealth Office. From 1977 to 1979, Mosley was based in Rome, teaching English as a second language and helping put into shape a data bank of statistics on European Community member countries. In 1980 he began his association with Debrett's Limited, becoming the first editor of Debrett's Handbook (1981), the forerunner of Debrett's People of Today (1983–1987). In 1983, Mosley returned to the staff of the Encyclopædia Britannica, serving first as Deputy London Editor then as London Editor. In 1989 Mosley became Editor-in-Chief of Burke's Peerage & Baronetage, a position he held until 2004, whereafter he renewed his association with Debrett's, serving as the Editor-in-Chief of Debrett's Limited until 2006 when he left the company to become a full-time author and broadcaster.

== Writing ==
Mosley also wrote many books, including a special jubilee volume on the English Monarchy entitled Blood Royal – From the time of Alexander the Great to Queen Elizabeth II, published in 2002. His last books were The Art of Oratory, published in 2007, and Charles Dickens: A celebration of his life and work, published in 2011. Mosley also contributed to periodicals and newspapers such as The Guardian, The Daily Telegraph, The Independent, and The Times. Mosley appeared on Sky One's So You Think You're Royal?, a genealogical tracking/tracing programme, opining on whether a given claim would entitle the claimant to an entry in Debrett's Peerage, also numerous episodes of BBC One's genealogy show Who Do You Think You Are?, with appearances on the U.S. version of the programme also.

His last book The Daffodil Library, a political thriller, was launched on 22 October 2013. On 1 November, his wife, the former publicist Lesley Lake, who had been in poor health for some time, died of an infection. On the same day, Mosley was admitted to Stoke Mandeville Hospital for treatment for cancer. He died on 5 November 2013.
