= Zurich University =

Zurich University may refer to:

- University of Zurich, founded in 1833
- Zurich University of Applied Sciences/ZHAW, founded in 2007
- Zurich University of the Arts, founded 2007
