= Eggel =

River in Germany

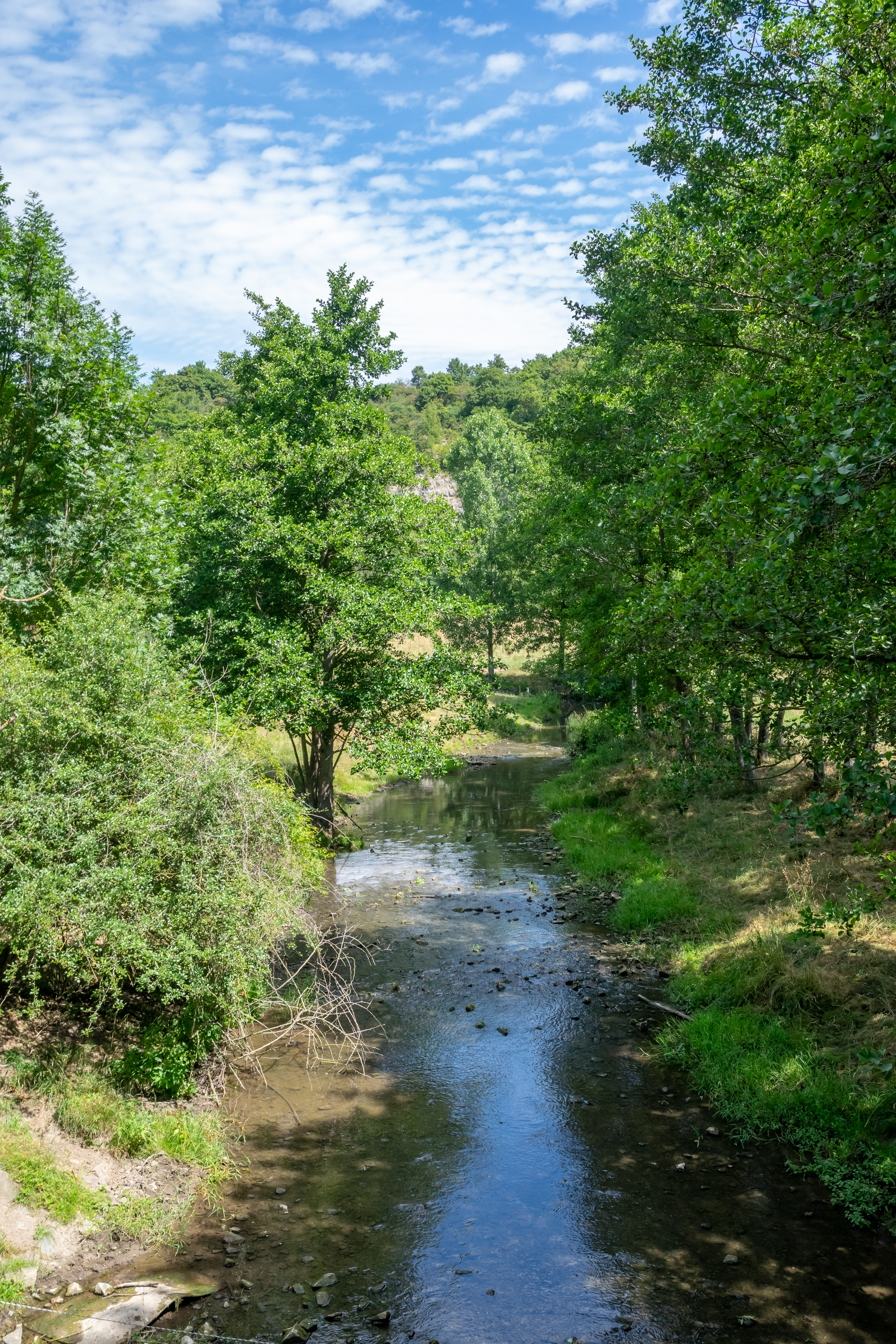

Location
- Country: Germany
- State: North Rhine-Westphalia

Physical characteristics
- Mouth
  - location: Diemel
  - coordinates: 51.4909°N 9.2394°E
- Length: 17.5 km (10.9 mi)

Basin features
- Progression: Diemel→ Weser→ North Sea

The Eggel is a river in North Rhine-Westphalia, Germany, and a left tributary of the Diemel. Its lower section forms the boundary between North Rhine-Westphalia and Hesse.

At this boundary of the two German states, it flows between Warburg in the west and Liebenau in the east at about 150 m above sea level into the Diemel, a western tributary of the Weser.

== See also ==
- List of rivers of North Rhine-Westphalia
- List of rivers of Hesse
