= Restorative dentistry =

Management and rehabilitation of dental disease

Restorative dentistry is the study, diagnosis and integrated management of diseases of the teeth and their supporting structures and the rehabilitation of the dentition to functional and aesthetic requirements of the individual. Restorative dentistry encompasses the dental specialties of endodontics, periodontics and prosthodontics and its foundation is based upon how these interact in cases requiring multifaceted care. This may require the close input from other dental specialties such as orthodontics, paediatric dentistry and special care dentistry, as well as surgical specialties such as oral and maxillofacial surgery.

Restorative dentistry aims to treat the teeth and their supporting structures. Many conditions and their consequences may be assessed and treated by a restorative dentist. Environmental causes may include as caries or maxillofacial trauma. Developmental issues may lead to the restorative dentist treating hypodontia, amelogenesis imperfecta, dentogenesis imperfecta or cleft palate. Multifactorial conditions with an environmental and genetic basis such as periodontitis, would be treated by restorative dentistry. Restorative dentists are part of the multidisciplinary team managing head and neck oncology cases, both before treatment and helping to rehabilitate the patient after surgery and/or radiotherapy.

In the UK, restorative dentistry is legally recognized as a specialty under EU directive and the General Dental Council and is represented by several specialist societies including the British Society for Restorative Dentistry and the Association of Consultants & Specialists in Restorative Dentistry. Restorative dentistry specialty training in the UK lasts five years, and upon successful completion, the dentist may be appointed as a consultant in restorative dentistry.

== Restorative dental treatments ==
Restorative dentistry combines the three dental monospecialties of endodontics, prosthodontics and periodontics. Restorative consultants work within dental hospital environments and receive referrals from other dental specialties and general dental practitioners. They may provide a treatment planning service or provide shared care with the referring dentist. Restorative dentists manage complex cases that would be difficult to manage in general dental practice that include, but are not limited to:

- Pre-radiotherapy head and neck oncology assessments
- Oral rehabilitation of patients after head and neck oncology treatment
- Provision of obturators for head and neck oncology and cleft palate patients
- Oral rehabilitation of hypodontia patients
- Oral rehabilitation of maxillofacial trauma patients
- Management of tooth wear cases
- Root canal therapy – both non-surgical and surgical
- Periodontal treatment – both non-surgical and surgical

== Common types of dental restorations ==
=== Dental crowns ===
Dental crowns are tooth-colored restorations or metal restorations. They replace the essential structures of a missing tooth caused by root canals, decay, or fractures. Crowns also serve as full "caps" that restore normal tooth size, shape, and function.

=== Dental fillings ===
Dental fillings are often used to fill cavities or holes after root canal treatment. They can also be used to restore worn teeth or fill gaps between teeth. Fillings can be made of amalgam (a metal alloy) or materials such as composite resin and glass ionomer.

=== Sinus lift and bone grafting ===
Occasionally, a dentist may recommend dental implants for a patient, but that patient does not have enough upper jaw bone to accommodate a dental implant. In this case, the dentist will recommend a sinus lift. A sinus lift is a surgical procedure in which bone is grafted onto the upper jaw. The membrane of the maxillary sinus is lifted upward, making space for additional bone.

=== Veneers ===
Veneers are layers of dental resin or ceramic that are placed over existing teeth. As Dr. Aggarwal explains, veneers require "minimal removal of tooth structure" and provide an improved aesthetic appearance.

While the low invasiveness of veneers may be attractive, they are more susceptible to damage than other treatments because they are so fragile. In addition, veneers may require multiple sessions to be placed. They are also more expensive, and insurance may not cover their costs

=== Bridge ===
A dental bridge is a fixed dental restoration (a fixed dental prosthesis) used to replace one or more missing teeth by joining an artificial tooth definitively to adjacent teeth or dental implants. Dental bridges are fixed prosthetic devices used to replace one or more missing teeth, restoring both function and aesthetics.

== Guidelines for children and adolescents ==
In the United States, the American Academy of Pediatric Dentistry (AAPD) has published the following guidelines:

- Guideline on Restorative Dentistry
- Guideline on Pulp Therapy for Primary and Immature Permanent Teeth
- Oral Health Policies & Recommendations (The Reference Manual of Pediatric Dentistry)
