= European Journal of Prosthodontics and Restorative Dentistry =

- Discipline: Prosthetic dentistry
- Language: English
- Edited by: Mutlu Özcan

Publication details
- History: 1992-present
- Publisher: Dennis Barber
- Frequency: Quarterly

Standard abbreviations
- ISO 4: Eur. J. Prosthodont. Restor. Dent.

Indexing
- ISSN: 0965-7452
- OCLC no.: 26659524

Links
- Journal homepage; Online archive

European Journal of Prosthodontics and Restorative Dentistry is a peer-reviewed medical journal published by Dennis Barber. It was established in 1992 with Paul S. Wright as its founding editor-in-chief. The current editor-in-chief is Mutlu Öczan (Zürich University) and the consulting editor is Igor R. Blum (King's College London). The journal is abstracted and indexed in MEDLINE/PubMed.
