= Professional Publishers Association =

Trade organization in the United Kingdom

The Professional Publishers Association (PPA), formerly known as the Periodical Publishers Association until 2011, is the main publishing industry body which promotes companies involved in the production of media, supporting the creative economy at governmental level in the United Kingdom.

== History ==
The organisation was first founded in 1913 as the Society of Weekly Newspapers and Periodical Proprieters to discuss matters around unionisation, distribution and material supplies in the early 20th Century. It celebrated its centenary on November 19, 2013.

== Operations ==
Much of the PPA's work is carried out through events, committees and public relations work as documented in their extensive archive of organisational documents dating back to 1942. The association now also covers digital media and a specific committee for smaller, independent publishers, the PPA Independent Publishers Network (IPN).

The current CEO of the PPA is Sajeeda Merali, appointed in 2021. The current Chair of the PPA Board is Nina Wright, appointed in 2022.

== Awards and events ==
The PPA Awards are run annually to recognise talent and excellence in the publishing industry. Relaunched in 2019. CampaignLive billed the 2020 awards as the "magazine Oscars". In 2020, the PPA Awards for Editor of the Year was won by Vogue magazine's Edward Enninful and the inaugural Diversity Initiative of the Year awarded to Meghan Markle's guest-edited "Forces for Change" issue.

Other events and awards run by the organisation are the PPA Independent Publisher Conference & Awards aimed at independent publications, the PPA New Talent/30 Under 30 Awards to recognise young professionals in the industry, and the PPA Festival. In 2019, the UK's Culture Secretary (minister), Jeremy Wright spoke at the PPA Festival.

New initiatives include the first ever industry-wide survey to boost diversity and inclusion in publishing, in the wake of its inaugural PPA Award and PPA Independent Publishing award.
