= American College of Prosthodontists =

American not-for-profit organization representing prosthodontists

- Founded: 1970; 56 years ago
- Type: Professional Association
- Location: Chicago, Illinois, United States
- Region served: United States
- Members: 3,700+
- Website: prosthodontics.org

The American College of Prosthodontists (ACP) is a not-for-profit organization representing prosthodontists within organized dentistry and to the public, with more than 3,700 members worldwide. Prosthodontics is one of the nine dental specialties defined by the American Dental Association, which recognizes the American College of Prosthodontists as the national organization representing the prosthodontic specialty.

Membership is open to individuals who have graduated from or are currently enrolled in an ADA-accredited advanced prosthodontics program. The ACP is the only prosthodontic specialty association where membership is based solely on education credentials. Certified dental laboratory technician and members of the prosthodontic academic community may become Alliance members of the College.

== Publications ==
The Journal of Prosthodontics is the official scholarly journal of the College, published eight times annually by Wiley-Blackwell. The Journal of Prosthodontics provides a forum for the presentation and discussion of evidence-based prosthodontic research, techniques, and procedures. The College also publishes a quarterly consumer-focused magazine, the ACP Messenger.

== Affiliate organizations ==
The College works with three affiliate organizations. The ACP Education Foundation seeks to expand education, research, and growth opportunities in prosthodontics. The American Board of Prosthodontics certifies individuals who have demonstrated special knowledge and skills in prosthodontics. The Prosthodontic Forum represents 19 member organizations, attempting to provide a unified voice and a means of exchanging ideas, incentives and information between prosthodontically oriented organizations.
