= Prosthodontics =

Area of dentistry focusing on dental prosthesis

- ICD-9-CM: 23.2-23.6
- MeSH: D011476

Prosthodontics, also known as dental prosthetics or prosthetic dentistry, is the area of dentistry that focuses on dental prostheses. It is one of 12 dental specialties recognized by the American Dental Association (ADA), Royal College of Surgeons of England, Royal College of Surgeons of Edinburgh, Royal College of Surgeons of Ireland, Royal College of Surgeons of Glasgow, Royal College of Dentists of Canada, and Royal Australasian College of Dental Surgeons. The ADA defines it as "the dental specialty pertaining to the diagnosis, treatment planning, rehabilitation and maintenance of the oral function, comfort, appearance and health of patients with clinical conditions associated with missing or deficient teeth or oral and maxillofacial tissues using biocompatible substitutes."

== History ==
Pierre Fauchard (died 1761) discovered many methods to replace lost teeth using substitutes made from carved blocks of ivory or bone. He also introduced dental braces to correct the position of teeth using gold wires and silk threads.

=== Women in prosthodontics ===
In 1964 Jeanne Sinkford became the first female prosthodontist with a PhD degree; her degree was in Physiology, and from Northwestern University.

In 1974 Patricia Smathers Moulton became the first woman certified by the American Board of Prosthodontics.

In 1994 Jane D. Brewer became the first female fellow in the Academy of Prosthodontics.

In 2003 Nancy S. Arbree became the first female president of the American College of Prosthodontists, and Rhonda Jacob became the first female American Board of Prosthodontics examiner.

In 2006 Jane D. Brewer became the first female president of the American Academy of Fixed Prosthodontics.

In 2008 Rhonda Jacob became the first female president of the Academy of Prosthodontics, and in 2010 she became the first female president of the American Board of Prosthodontics.

== Training ==
According to the American College of Prosthodontists, a prosthodontist is a dentist who:

1. Specializes in the aesthetic (cosmetic) restoration and replacement of teeth.
2. Receives three to four years of additional training after dental school.
3. Restores optimal appearance and function to one's smile.

The planning, surgical placement (subcrestal prosthodontics) and restoration of implants and rehabilitation of occlusion with prostheses all fall under the field of prosthodontics. The American College of Prosthodontists (ACP) ensures that standards are maintained in the field. Becoming a prosthodontist requires an additional three years of postgraduate specialty training after obtaining a dental degree. Recently, the ADA's Commission on Dental Accreditation (CODA) passed the updated educational standards for all prosthodontics programs in the United States that now mandates surgical placement of dental implants (subcrestal prosthodontics) at an in-depth competency level (on par with other surgical dental specialties) Training consists of rigorous clinical and didactic preparation in the basic sciences, head and neck anatomy, biomedical sciences, biomaterial sciences, implant surgery, function of occlusion (bite), TMJ, and treatment planning and experience treating full-mouth reconstruction cases, and esthetics. At Ajman University, the Master of Clinical Dentistry in Prosthodontics follows a similar advanced training model. The program offers a comprehensive three-year curriculum designed to prepare dental professionals for complex prosthodontic cases, including implant placement, occlusion rehabilitation, and esthetic restorations. Due to this extensive training, prosthodontists are required to treat complex cases, full-mouth rehabilitation, TMJ-related disorders, congenital disorders, and sleep apnea by planning and fabricating various prostheses. There are only 3,200 prosthodontists in comparison to 170,000 general dentists in the United States. Prosthodontists have been consistently ranked at 6th or 7th positions by Forbes among America's most competitive and highest salaried jobs.

Board certification is awarded through the American Board of Prosthodontics (ABP) and requires successful completion of the Part I written examination and Part 2, 3 and 4 oral examinations. The written and one oral examination may be taken during the 3rd year of speciality training and the remaining two oral examinations taken following completion of speciality training. Board eligibility starts when an application is approved by the ABP and lasts for six years. Diplomates of the ABP are ethically required to have a practice limited to prosthodontics. Fellows of the American College of Prosthodontists (FACP) are required to have a dental degree, have completed three years of prosthodontic speciality training, and be board certified by the ABP.

According to the ADA, specialties are recognized in those areas where advanced knowledge and skills are essential to maintain or restore oral health (Principles of Ethics and Code of Professional Conduct). Not all areas in dentistry will satisfy the requirements for specialty recognition. Acknowledged by the profession, the contributions of such and their endeavors are encouraged.

The American Dental Association does not recognize cosmetic dentistry as a speciality. Prosthodontics is the only dental speciality under which the concentration of cosmetic/esthetic dentistry falls. General dentists may perform some simple cosmetic procedures. Consequently, there are questions regarding whether it is ethical for general dentists to treat "smile makeovers" or complex cosmetic and full-mouth reconstruction cases, as they are not qualified to address the complex needs of the patient. Likewise, there is no specialty recognized by the ADA for dental implants.

== Maxillofacial prosthodontics/prosthetics ==
Maxillofacial prosthetics (Oral and Maxillofacial Prosthodontics) is a sub-specialty (or super-specialty) of prosthodontics. All maxillofacial prosthodontists first specialize in prosthodontics and then super-specialize with a one year fellowship exclusively in maxillofacial prosthetics. A fellowship provides intensive clinical, hospital and laboratory training. Maxillofacial prosthodontists treat patients who have acquired and congenital defects of the head and neck and maxillofacial region due to cancer, surgery, trauma, or birth defects. Maxillary obturators, speech-aid prosthesis (formerly called as pharyngeal/soft palate obturators) and mandibular-resection prostheses are the most common intra-oral prostheses planned and fabricated by Maxillofacial prosthodontists. Facial prostheses include artificial eyes, nose, ears and other facial prostheses fabricated by the clinician or in conjunction with an anaplastologist.

Treatment is multidisciplinary, involving oral and maxillofacial surgeons, plastic surgeons, head and neck surgeons, ENT doctors, medical oncologists, radiation oncologists, hospital dentists, speech pathologies (speech therapists), clinical psychologist, occupational therapists, physiotherapists, and other healthcare professionals. The American Academy of Maxillofacial Prosthetics is the academy of this discipline: American Academy of Maxillofacial Prosthetics – AAMP.

== Conditions ==
- All-on-4
- Bisphosphonate-associated osteonecrosis of the jaw
- Bruxism
- Edentulism
- Occlusal trauma
- Temporomandibular joint disorder

== Treatments ==
- Bridge
- Centric relation
- Crown
- Veneer
- Dental surgery
- Complete dentures
- Fixed prosthodontics
- Inlays and onlays
- Removable partial denture
- SMK (dentistry)
- Implant dentistry
- Full mouth rehabilitation

== See also ==
- British Society for Restorative Dentistry
- Commonly used terms of relationship and comparison in dentistry
- Craniofacial prosthesis
- Dental fear
- Dental restoration
- Mandibular advancement splint
- Oral and maxillofacial surgery
- European Journal of Prosthodontics and Restorative Dentistry
