= Jeffrey Schmalz =

American journalist

- Born: December 6, 1953; Willow Grove, Pennsylvania, US
- Died: November 6, 1993 (aged 39)
- Occupation: journalist
- Years active: 1970s–1993
- Known for: Reporting on the AIDS crisis

Jeffrey Schmalz (/ʃmɑːlts/; December 6, 1953 – November 6, 1993) was an American journalist who spent his entire career of more than 20 years with The New York Times. He is best known for his groundbreaking reporting on the emerging HIV/AIDS crisis of the 1980s and 1990s and its impact on the LGBT community at that time.

Schmalz himself was a gay man who paved the way for other gay reporters at the Times in an era when homosexuality was more heavily stigmatized in the newsroom and the country as a whole. He was diagnosed with AIDS in 1990 and died of AIDS-related complications on November 6, 1993, at the age of 39. He had booked a dinner at a restaurant in lower Manhattan for his 40th birthday party. Instead, the party became a memorial gathering held on December 6, 1993.

Schmalz's reporting on AIDS includes in-depth profiles of well-known people with HIV/AIDS like Mary Fisher, Magic Johnson, and Larry Kramer. His work is recounted in the December 2015 book and radio documentary "Dying Words: The AIDS Reporting of Jeff Schmalz and How It Transformed The New York Times", by Samuel G. Freedman.

== Early life ==
Schmalz was born and raised in Willow Grove, Pennsylvania. His parents split up when he was two. His father was an alcoholic who died when Jeff was a teenager. His mother worked at the local Sears and raised Jeff and his sister Wendy with the help of family nearby. Jeff worked on his high school newspaper and graduated valedictorian. He received a scholarship for fatherless sons to attend Columbia University in New York City in 1971. He studied economics, and considered law school before he began working at The New York Times.

== Career ==
Schmalz's career began in January 1973 at The New York Times where he worked as a night copy boy while attending Columbia. He was 19 years old. When he was promoted to a copy editor position, he dropped out of college. Later, Schmalz worked as a metropolitan news reporter and a regional editor before being named chief of the paper's Albany bureau in 1986, where he chronicled the early years of New York Governor Mario Cuomo's rise to prominence.

In 1988, The New York Times sent Schmalz to Miami, where he served as bureau chief before returning to New York two years later as deputy national editor under Soma Golden Behr. In October of that year, Schmalz, while still in the closet to his bosses at the Times, wrote an article about how AIDS discrimination affected the lives of the Ray brothers in Arcadia, Florida.

== AIDS diagnosis ==
On the afternoon of Friday, December 21, 1990, Schmalz had a seizure and collapsed working at his desk at The New York Times. By February, his doctors had determined Schmalz had AIDS. His T cell count was just two and he had progressive multifocal leukoencephalopathy (PML), a brain disease that is often fatal within months. He told his editors about his illness and took a health leave for about seven months. He responded well to AZT and returned to The New York Times just after Labor Day in 1991. He decided to cover the 1992 presidential campaign.

== AIDS Reporting ==
While Schmalz covered the 1992 U.S. presidential campaign, he started to figure out the way he wanted to cover AIDS. In June 1992, he wrote his first post-diagnosis article about the disease, a profile piece on dermatologist Marcus Conant, one of the first U.S. doctors to diagnose and treat AIDS back in 1981. The New Yorker wrote an article about Schmalz and his work on October 5, 1992 and one month later he discussed his career and his illness during an appearance on Charlie Rose.

On December 20, 1992, Schmalz wrote a first-person story for The New York Times titled, "Covering AIDS and Living with It: A Reporter's Testimony." This first-person journalism was new for Schmalz, who had been a consummate Timesman focused on objectivity and non-biased reporting. In his first-person piece, Schmalz wrote about waking up with nightmares where he was in a coffin, about his mother's death after she learned he had AIDS, and his sense of being completely alone.

In New York magazine, Edwin Diamon profiled Schmalz in the May 24, 1993 issue. The article, Out of the Closet: The Times New Gay Voice. Schmalz's last pre-mortem Times article – a profile of author and person with AIDS Harold Brodkey – ran on June 17, 1993. ABC News aired a profile of Schmalz called "A Reporter's Notebook" on its TV news show Day One on October 11, 1993.

Schmalz's partner, Louis Broman, died of AIDS on March 27, 1995. The couple met in an AIDS support group.

== Legacy ==
On November 28, 1993, three weeks after Schmalz' death, The New York Times Magazine ran Schmalz's final article "Whatever Happened to AIDS?" and President Bill Clinton mentioned Schmalz and the article in his December 1, 1993 address on World AIDS Day at Georgetown University Medical Center.

Schmalz was memorialized publicly at a memorial service held at the Dalton School in New York City on December 7, 1993, with eulogies by Soma Golden Behr, Peter Kaufman, Anna Quindlen, Mary Fisher, Larry Kramer and David W. Dunlap.

In addition to Mary Fisher, Magic Johnson, and Larry Kramer, Schmalz profiled many famous people who had HIV and/or AIDS, some who ultimately died from the disease, including journalist Randy Shilts, child advocate and activist Elizabeth Glaser, writer Harold Brodkey, attorney Thomas Stoddard, and AIDS and environmental activist Bob Hattoy.

== Bibliography ==
- Samuel G. Freedman, Kerry Donahue, Dying Words: The AIDS Reporting of Jeff Schmalz, OR Books, LLC, 2015, ISBN 9781682190364
