= Schmaltz (surname) =

Schmaltz or Schmalz is a German surname. Notable people with the surname include:

- Clarence Vincent Schmalz (1916–1981), Canadian ice hockey administrator
- Devon Vonder Schmalz (born 1999), American singer-songwriter better known as Dev Lemons
- Gabriele Krone-Schmalz (born 1949), German journalist and author
- Gottfried Schmalz (born 1946), German dental academic
- Herbert Gustave Schmalz (1856–1935), British painter
- Jeffrey Schmalz (1953–1993), American journalist
- Jordan Schmaltz (born 1993), American ice hockey player
- Julien-Désiré Schmaltz (1771–1826), French colonial administrator
- Kathy Schmaltz, American politician from Michigan
- Nick Schmaltz (born 1996), American ice hockey player
- Roland Schmaltz (born 1974), German chess player
- Tad Schmaltz (born 1960), American philosopher
- Valentin Schmaltz (1572–1622), German writer and theologian
- Wilhelm Schmalz (1901–1983), German army general
- William Schmalz (1862–1933), Canadian insurance company executive
