= Schmaltz =

Rendered poultry fat

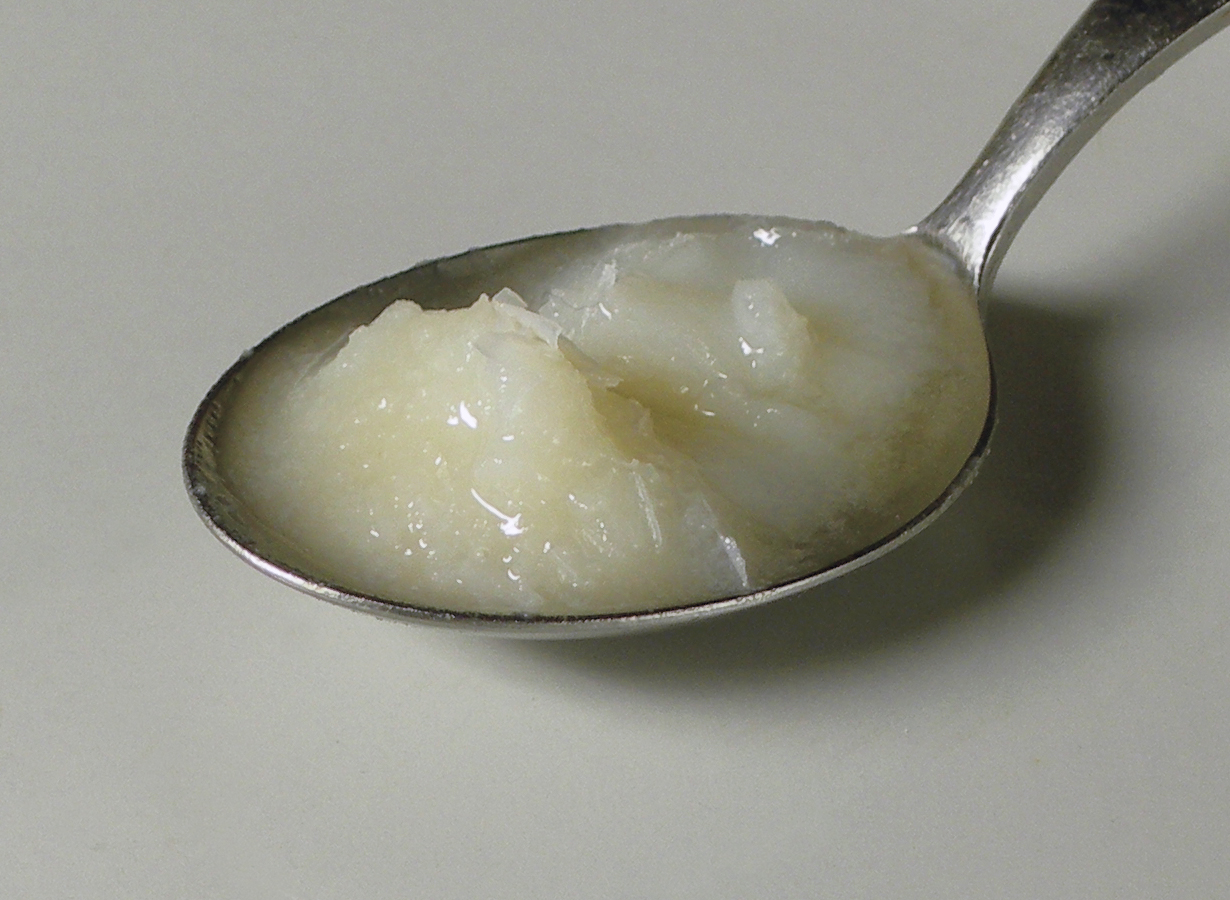
- Schmaltz derived from goose fat
- Type: Cooking fat or spread
- Region or state: Jewish communities in central and eastern Europe, eventually international adoption
- Created by: Ashkenazi Jews
- Main ingredients: Fat (chicken, goose, or duck)

Schmaltz (chicken)
Nutritional value per 100 g (3.5 oz)
- Energy: 3,767 kJ (900 kcal)
- Carbohydrates: 0 g
- Fat: 99.8 g
- Saturated: 30 g
- Monounsaturated: 45 g
- Polyunsaturated: 21 g
- Protein: 0 g
Vitamins and minerals
| Vitamins | Quantity %DV^{†} |
| Vitamin E | 18% 2.7 mg |
| Minerals | Quantity %DV^{†} |
| Selenium | 0% 0.2 μg |
- Other constituents: Quantity
- Cholesterol: 85 mg
- Fat percentage can vary.
- ^{†}Percentages estimated using US recommendations for adults.

Schmaltz (also spelled schmalz or shmalz) is rendered (clarified) chicken or goose fat. It is an integral part of traditional Ashkenazi Jewish cuisine, where it has been used for centuries in a wide array of dishes, such as chicken soup, latkes, matzah brei, chopped liver, matzah balls, fried chicken, and many others, as a cooking fat, spread, or flavor enhancer.

== Etymology ==
The noun Schmaltz is derived from the German verb schmelzen 'to melt', from the West Germanic root *smeltan, modern English to smelt. It entered English through Yiddish-speaking Ashkenazi Jews who used schmaltz to refer to kosher poultry fat; the Yiddish word שמאַלץ shmalts refers to rendered chicken fat. The English term schmaltz is derived from Yiddish and is cognate with the German term Schmalz, which can refer to any rendered fat of animal origin, including lard (more precisely Schweineschmalz) and clarified butter (Butterschmalz); though according to German law, Schmalz must exclusively refer to a lard-based product in a commercial context. English use tends to follow Yiddish, which limits the meaning of schmaltz to rendered poultry fat.

== History ==
Historically, chicken and to a lesser extent other poultry have been the most popular meat in Ashkenazi Jewish cuisine due to restrictions on Jews who often were not allowed to own land in Europe, and thereby were not able to tend to any livestock requiring pasture. Among kosher domestic animals, only chickens and other fowl could be raised without pasturage. Schmaltz originated in the Jewish communities of north, west, and central Europe as it was an economical replacement for olive oil that typically was not available in these areas. Olive oil previously had an important role in Jewish culture. It had been used by the ancestors of the Ashkenazi Jews in their Ancient Israelite cuisine prior to the forced exile of Jews from Roman Israel, and it remained popular in Sephardic and Mizrahi cuisines.

As olive oil and other vegetable oils (e.g. sesame oil, which Jews had used in Mesopotamia) were unavailable in northwestern Europe, Ashkenazi Jews turned to animal sources, like their Gentile neighbors. However, kashrut prohibited Jews from using the most common cooking fats in northern Europe, namely butter and lard. Butter, being derived from milk, cannot be used with meat under the Jewish prohibition on mixing meat and dairy, while lard is derived from pork, which is not kosher. Among the less common fats, tallow derived from beef or mutton would have been uneconomical, particularly given that virtually all suet (the raw material for tallow) is chelev and its consumption is forbidden. Thus Ashkenazi Jews turned to poultry fat as their cooking fat of choice. This fat, which they called schmaltz, became the most popular cooking fat used in the shtetls (Jewish villages) of central and eastern Europe. It was commonly used in a multitude of dishes served with, or containing, meat in accordance with kosher dietary laws.

At the turn of the twentieth century, as the Ashkenazi Jews fled escalating antisemitism and persecution in Europe and sought refuge in the United States and other countries, they brought with them their traditional foods, including schmaltz. It remained popular in American Jewish cuisine until it fell out of common use over the course of the second half of the century due to the inconvenience involved in its preparation, health concerns regarding its saturated fat content, various diet trends, and aggressive marketing by Crisco of their vegetable shortening (which is pareve, i.e. suitable for use with both milk and meat dishes) to the Jewish community of New York.

Over time, schmaltz was replaced with what often were vegetarian alternatives that were perceived to be healthier, such as vegetable shortening, olive oil, and margarine. Despite this, schmaltz remained in common use at Jewish delicatessens and Jewish restaurants as well as among those in the Haredi community.

Beginning in the twenty-first century, schmaltz regained much of its former popularity as various celebrity chefs such as Anthony Bourdain, Alon Shaya, Michael Solomonov, Joan Nathan, and others began to incorporate it into various dishes and recipes as part of food trends popularizing long-forgotten Jewish foods. Schmaltz also began being used in various non-traditional ways, such as in cornbread, chicken pot pie, and other foods as a flavor enhancer.

== Process ==
The manufacture of schmaltz involves cutting the fatty tissues of a bird (chicken or goose) into small pieces, melting the fat, and collecting the drippings. Schmaltz may be prepared by a dry process where the pieces are cooked under low heat and stirred, gradually yielding their fat. A wet process melts the fat by direct steam injection. The rendered schmaltz is then filtered and clarified.

Homemade Jewish-style schmaltz is made by cutting chicken or goose fat into small pieces and melting in a pan over low-to-moderate heat, generally with onions. After the majority of the fat has been extracted, the melted fat is strained through a cheesecloth into a storage container. The remaining dark brown, crispy bits of skin and onion are known in Yiddish as gribenes.

Another simple method is as a by-product of the making of poultry soup, stock, or broth. After the chicken is simmered in the pot or crock-pot, the broth is chilled so the fat rises to the top. Then the fat can be skimmed off, at once providing schmaltz to set aside for other uses and a lower-fat broth that is heated before serving.

== Uses ==
Schmaltz typically has a strong aroma, and therefore, often is used for hearty recipes such as stews or roasts. It is a key ingredient in Jewish soups such as chicken soup, as well as in matzo ball soup and some cholent. Sometimes it is used as a bread spread, where it may be salted. Generally, this is consumed on Jewish rye or challah breads. It may be used to prepare foods served as part of fleishig (meat) meals such as latkes, matzah brei, or potato kugel, or instead of butter when pan-frying potatoes, onions, or other foods.

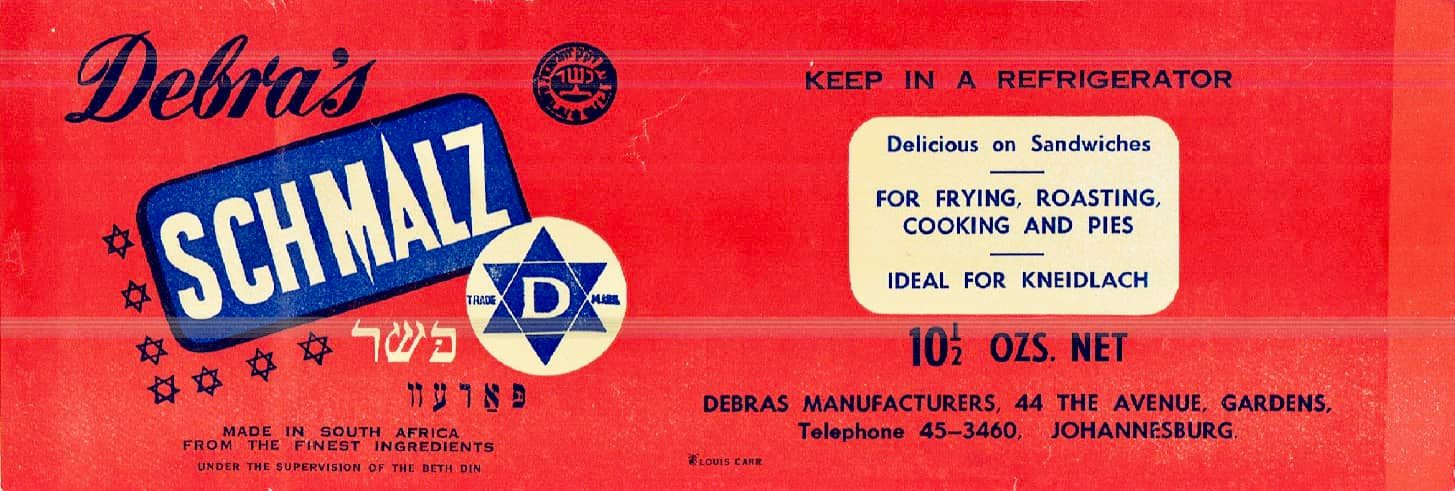
Debra's Schmalz label from 1951

== Vegetarian schmaltz ==
Various vegetarian (and consequently pareve) versions of schmaltz have been marketed, starting with Nyafat (U.S., Rokeach and Sons, 1924), which is largely coconut oil with some onion flavoring and color. Vegetable shortening also is used as a substitute.

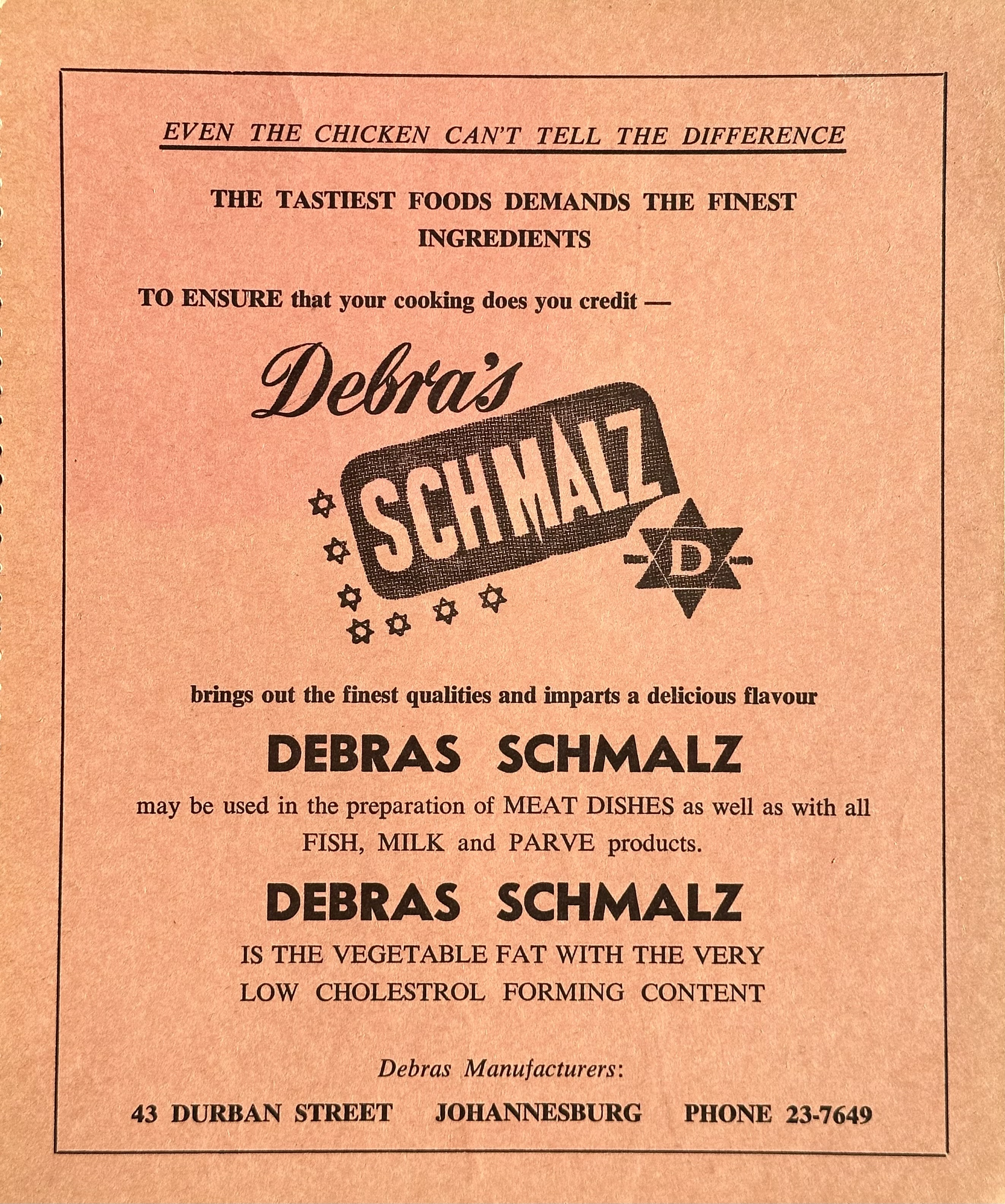
Debra's Schmalz advert from the 1950s

Vegetarian schmaltz was manufactured in South Africa from July 1951 under the brand Debra's Schmalz, with “Debra” referring to Debora Bregman, who founded Debras Manufacturers. Production began in Bregman's home kitchen in Norwood before moving to a dedicated manufacturing facility and office in Johannesburg. The slogan "Even the chicken can't tell the difference" was added soon after production began. Debra's Schmalz was eventually distributed across southern Africa. The business was sold by the Bregman family in 1976, and Debra's Schmalz continued to be manufactured and distributed. Chef Oded Schwartz discusses Debra's Schmalz in his book In Search of Plenty — A History of Jewish Food.

== Derived meanings ==
- Schmaltz herring means 'fatty herring' and refers to the stage of development in the life cycle of herring when the fish contains the most fat, popular in Ashkenazi Jewish cookery, but it does not contain schmaltz.
- In American English, via Yiddish, schmaltz (adj. schmaltzy) also has an informal meaning of 'excessively sentimental or florid music or art' or 'maudlin sentimentality', similar to one of the uses of the words corn or corny. Its earliest use in this sense dates to the mid-1930s. In German, schmalzig also is used in the same sense.
- Schmaltz and Schmalz are rare last names among people of German and Austrian descent. Schmaltz was used as a metonymic occupational name for a chandler.

== See also ==
- Schmaltz (surname)
- Gribenes
- List of spreads
- List of Jewish foods
