= Gottfried Schmalz =

German dentist and university professor

- Born: October 13, 1946 (age 80)
- Occupations: Dentist, professor

Academic background
- Education: University of Bonn; University of Tübingen

Academic work
- Institutions: University of Regensburg
- Main interests: Biocompatibility of dental materials and regenerative dentistry

Gottfried Schmalz (born 13 October 1946) is a German dentist and academic. From 1983 to 2013 he was Professor and Director of the Clinic for Conservative Dentistry and Periodontology at the University of Regensburg.

== Career ==
Schmalz passed his state examination at the University of Bonn in 1971 and obtained his doctorate in dentistry. From 1974 to 1975 he was a postdoctoral researcher at the Material Science Toxicology Laboratory of the University of Tennessee in Memphis. He completed his habilitation at the University of Tübingen in 1980.

From 1973 to 1980, Schmalz worked as a research assistant and senior physician for conservative dentistry at the University of Tübingen. In 1983, he was appointed to the University of Regensburg, where he took over the Chair of Conservative Dentistry and Periodontology and the directorate of the associated polyclinic (outpatient clinic), which he headed until his retirement in 2013. Schmalz held academic leadership positions at the University of Regensburg for many years. From 1985 to 1987, he was Dean of the Faculty of Medicine, from 1988 to 1990 and from 2005 to 2007 a member of the University Senate, and from 2007 Chairman of the University Senate.

He has also been a visiting and honorary professor at several universities, including the University of Houston (since 1998), Baylor College of Dentistry in Dallas (since 2007), the Universities of Cluj-Napoca and Bucharest, and the University of Bern (2014–2017 Department of Conservative Dentistry, since then visiting professor at the Department of Periodontology).

Schmalz held various positions in professional associations. Among other things, he was President of the German Society for Conservative Dentistry (1984–1988) and President of the German Society of Dentistry and Oral Medicine (1993–1997), both of which he is an honorary member.

He was also President of the Continental European Division of the International Association for Dental, Oral, and Craniofacial Research (IADR) (1986–1987) and President of the Paneuropean Region of IADR (2014–2016). Within the IADR, Schmalz was also a member of the Global Board representing the Pan European Region from 2019 to 2022. From 1996 to 2016 he was co-founder and first editor-in-chief of the journal Clinical Oral Investigations, and has since been honorary editor-in-chief.

== Research ==
Schmalz investigated the biocompatibility of dental materials, the control of dental tissue regeneration and the clinical suitability of ceramic, amalgam and resin-based composite material restorations. He developed in vitro methods for testing material biocompatibility, including a tooth model with three-dimensional pulp cell cultures as an alternative to animal testing. Together with his team, he described the mechanisms of cytotoxicity of dental acrylates and metals and the influence of antioxidants on these processes. He also researched the regeneration of pulp and periodontium using signalling molecules from dentin and through the use of matrix materials and membranes.

== Selected publications ==
=== Books ===
- Schmalz, G. (1981). Die Gewebeverträglichkeit zahnärztlicher Materialien – Möglichkeiten einer standardisierten Prüfung in der Zellkultur. Stuttgart/New York: Thieme. ISBN 3-13-618401-7.
- Schmalz, G.; Arenholt-Bindslev, D. (eds.) (2004). Biokompatibilität zahnärztlicher Werkstoffe. Munich: Elsevier – Urban & Fischer. ISBN 978-3-437-05190-6.
- Schmalz, G.; Arenholt-Bindslev, D. (eds.) (2008). Biocompatibility of Dental Materials. Berlin/Heidelberg: Springer. ISBN 978-3-540-77781-6.

=== Articles (selection) ===
Schmalz has authored several hundred scientific articles; more than 310 of these are indexed in PubMed. As of December 2025, his h-index is 92.

- Schmalz, G.; Preiss, A.; Arenholt-Bindslev, D. (1 September 1999). “Bisphenol-A content of resin monomers and related degradation products.” Clinical Oral Investigations. 3 (3): 114–119. doi:10.1007/s007840050088.
- Schmalz, G.; Garhammer, P. (1 July 2002). “Biological interactions of dental cast alloys with oral tissues.” Dental Materials. 18 (5): 396–406. doi:10.1016/S0109-5641(01)00063-X.
- Galler, K. M.; Schweikl, H.; Thonemann, B.; D’Souza, R. N.; Schmalz, G. (April 2006). “Human pulp-derived cells immortalized with Simian Virus 40 T-antigen.” European Journal of Oral Sciences. 114 (2): 138–146. doi:10.1111/j.1600-0722.2006.00327.x.
- Schweikl, H.; Spagnuolo, G.; Schmalz, G. (1 October 2006). “Genetic and cellular toxicology of dental resin monomers.” Journal of Dental Research. 85 (10): 870–877. doi:10.1177/154405910608501001.
- Morsczeck, C.; Schmalz, G.; Reichert, T. E.; Völlner, F.; Galler, K.; Driemel, O. (June 2008). “Somatic stem cells for regenerative dentistry.” Clinical Oral Investigations. 12 (2): 113–118. doi:10.1007/s00784-007-0170-8.
- Galler, K. M.; D’Souza, R. N.; Federlin, M.; Cavender, A. C.; Hartgerink, J. D.; Hecker, S.; Schmalz, G. (November 2011). “Dentin conditioning codetermines cell fate in regenerative endodontics.” Journal of Endodontics. 37 (11): 1536–1541. doi:10.1016/j.joen.2011.08.027.
- Galler, K. M.; Eidt, A.; Schmalz, G. (April 2014). “Cell-free approaches for dental pulp tissue engineering.” Journal of Endodontics. 40 (4): S41–S45. doi:10.1016/j.joen.2014.01.014.
- Galler, K. M.; Buchalla, W.; Hiller, K.-A.; Federlin, M.; Eidt, A.; Schiefersteiner, M.; Schmalz, G. (March 2015). “Influence of root canal disinfectants on growth factor release from dentin.” Journal of Endodontics. 41 (3): 363–368. doi:10.1016/j.joen.2014.11.021.
- Schmalz, G.; Hickel, R.; van Landuyt, K. L.; Reichl, F.-X. (1 November 2017). “Nanoparticles in dentistry.” Dental Materials. 33 (11): 1298–1314. doi:10.1016/j.dental.2017.08.193.
- Schmalz, G.; Widbiller, M.; Galler, K. M. (September 2020). “Clinical perspectives of pulp regeneration.” Journal of Endodontics. 46 (9): S161–S174. doi:10.1016/j.joen.2020.06.037.
- Widbiller, M.; Schmalz, G. (April 2021). “Endodontic regeneration: hard shell, soft core.” Odontology. 109 (2): 303–312. doi:10.1007/s10266-020-00573-1. PMID 33263826.
- Schmalz, G.; Hickel, R.; Price, R. B.; Platt, J. A. (1 February 2023). “Bioactivity of dental restorative materials: FDI policy statement.” International Dental Journal. 73 (1): 21–27. doi:10.1016/j.identj.2022.11.012. PMID 36577639.

== Awards (selection) ==
Schmalz was elected to the German National Academy of Sciences Leopoldina in 2006 and served as a Senator of the academy from 2011 to 2016. In 2009 he received the Order of Merit of the Federal Republic of Germany for his services to dentistry.

He received the Award of Excellence of the European Federation of Conservative Dentistry in 2011 and honorary doctorates from the Iuliu Hațieganu University of Cluj in 2015 and the Carol Davila University of Bucharest in 2018.

From the International Association for Dental Research (IADR) he received the Distinguished Scientist Award in 2007, the Distinguished Service Award in 2011 and the Ryge–Mahler Award in 2019. In 2025 the IADR awarded him its gold medal, the association's highest honour.
