= Sumita Mitra =

Indian-American inventor

Sumita Basu Mitra
- Education: Presidency College Calcutta; University of Calcutta; University of Michigan
- Awards: National Academy of Engineering; National Academy of Inventors; National Inventors Hall of Fame
- Scientific career
- Workplaces: 3M; Case Western Reserve University; University of South Florida
- Thesis: Cross-linking of proteins by equilibrium transfer alkylation. (1977)

Sumita Basu Mitra (born 1949) is an Indian-American inventor who is a professor at the University of South Florida. She developed the nanomaterials used in state-of-the-art 3M dental composites, which have been used in billions of procedures around the world. She is a Fellow of the National Academy of Engineering, the National Academy of Inventors, and the National Inventors Hall of Fame.

== Early life and education ==
In 1978, Mitra joined 3M, where she worked as a senior chemist focusing on materials for health care. She specialized in nanotechnology, adhesion science, and surface chemistry.[5] In particular, she focused on the realization of smart materials to help in dentistry.[6] At the time, dentists performed tooth repairs using a combination of two different materials, microfills and microhybrid composites.[4] Mitra designed the nanomaterials-based filler platform that 3M uses for all state-of-the-art dental restoratives.[7] Nanoparticles ('nanomeric filler particles') within these materials imitate teeth's natural enamel, allowing them to remain glossy and strong. She showed that these materials could be used to restore teeth in any area of the mouth. These platforms enabled the realization of the Filtek composites.[6] These composites have been used in hundreds of millions of procedures worldwide. The first generation of the composites was launched in 2002 and the second generation in 2005.[8]

Mitra's innovation fundamentally addressed key limitations in previous dental restoration materials: lack of durability, aesthetics, and universal applicability. Her introduction of nanotechnology into dental composites helped overcome the dichotomy between strength and polishability. By utilizing nanosized silica and zirconia particles, she was able to create a hybrid structure that provided both superior mechanical properties and a lifelike appearance, which was previously difficult to achieve in dental restorations.[18]

The development of Filtek Supreme Universal Restorative revolutionized restorative dentistry. Prior to this, many patients would experience degraded fillings over time due to the incompatibility of filler sizes and the breakdown of materials under stress. Mitra’s composites resolved this by offering wear resistance comparable to natural enamel and high translucency for aesthetic applications.[19] Since their release, Filtek materials have become one of the most widely used dental composites worldwide and remain in production today, having undergone continued innovation.[20]

Beyond her direct contributions to dental materials, Mitra also played a major role in mentoring younger scientists and advocating for women in STEM. Her influence has been acknowledged through global recognition, including the 2021 European Inventor Award and her induction into the National Inventors Hall of Fame in 2018. Even after retirement from 3M in 2010, she remained active in the field through her consulting work and academic involvement at the University of South Florida.[21]

After retiring from 3M in 2010, Mitra established her own consulting company. She joined the Institute for Advanced Discovery at the University of South Florida in 2021.[9] Mitra holds almost one hundred patents in nano composites and dental adhesives.[8]

== Awards and honors ==
- 1998 Inducted into 3M's Carlton Society
- 2004 American Chemical Society Regional Industrial Innovation Award
- 2009 American Chemical Society “Heroes of Chemistry Award”
- 2012 Peyton-Skinner Award for Innovation in Dental Materials
- 2018 Elected to the National Inventors Hall of Fame
- 2021 Elected to the National Academy of Engineering
- 2021 European Inventor Award
- 2021 Elected to the National Academy of Inventors
- 2025 Inducted into the Florida Inventors Hall of Fame

== Selected publications ==
- Sumita B Mitra; Dong Wu; Brian N Holmes (2003). "An application of nanotechnology in advanced dental materials". Journal of the American Dental Association. 134 (10): 1382–1390. doi:10.14219/jada.archive.2003.0054. PMID 14620019. Wikidata Q51797501.
- Mitra SB; Kedrowski BL (1994). "Long-term mechanical properties of glass ionomers". Dental Materials. 10 (2): 78–82. doi:10.1016/0109-5641(94)90044-2. PMID 7758852. Wikidata Q54213758.
- Sumita B Mitra; Chi-Ying Lee; Hoa T Bui; Daranee Tantbirojn; Richard P Rusin (2008). "Long-term adhesion and mechanism of bonding of a paste-liquid resin-modified glass-ionomer". Dental Materials. 25 (4): 459–466. doi:10.1016/j.dental.2008.09.008. PMID 19041127. Wikidata Q82761926.
