= Mary Fisher (activist) =

American political activist, artist and author

- Born: Lizabeth Davis Frehling; April 6, 1948 (age 78); Louisville, Kentucky, U.S.
- Education: University of Michigan; Kingswood School
- Occupations: Activist, artist, author
- Known for: AIDS activism
- Spouse: Brian Campbell (1987–1991; divorced)
- Children: 2
- Website: www.maryfisher.com

Mary Fisher (born April 6, 1948) is an American political activist, artist and author. After contracting HIV from her second husband, she has become an outspoken HIV/AIDS-activist for the prevention, education and for the compassionate treatment of people with HIV and AIDS. Fisher is particularly noted for speeches before two Republican Conventions: Houston in 1992 and San Diego in 1996. The 1992 speech has been hailed as "one of the best American speeches of the 20th Century".

She is the founder of a non-profit organization to fund HIV/AIDS research and education, the Mary Fisher Clinical AIDS Research and Education (CARE) Fund. Since May 2006, she has been a global emissary for the Joint United Nations Programme on HIV/AIDS (UNAIDS).

== Early life ==
Fisher was born Lizabeth Davis Frehling on April 6, 1948, in Louisville, Kentucky, the daughter of Marjorie Faith (née Switow) and George Allen Frehling. Her parents were of Russian Jewish descent. Her parents divorced when she was four, and the following year her mother married multimillionaire Max Fisher, who adopted her and whose surname she took.

Raised in Michigan, Fisher attended Kingswood School (today's Cranbrook Kingswood School) in Bloomfield Hills (where she had briefly dated future politician Mitt Romney), and attended college at the University of Michigan for a year before taking a volunteer position at ABC television in Detroit, Michigan, which she left when afforded an opportunity to join the staff of Gerald R. Ford, then President of the United States, as the first female "advance man".

In 1977, Fisher entered her first marriage, which soon dissolved. In 1984, she sought treatment at the Betty Ford Center for alcoholism; while there, she realized she was artistically inclined. After rehabilitation, she resettled to New York City, New York, and in 1987 she married fellow artist Brian Campbell. The couple relocated to Boca Raton, Florida, and expanded their family. Fisher gave birth to son Max and after several miscarriages, adopted a second son, Zachary, with her husband. In 1990, Campbell requested a divorce and in 1991 informed Fisher that he was HIV positive. Fisher soon learned that she had contracted the virus from him, although their children tested negative. Campbell died from the virus in 1993.

== Activist ==
Fisher decided to be open about her HIV status, and after the Detroit Free Press published her story in February 1992, she was invited to speak at the 1992 Republican National Convention in Houston, Texas. There, she urged the Republican Party to handle the AIDS crisis and those living with HIV with compassion in her speech, "A Whisper of Aids". In 1995, The New York Times credited Fisher, along with Elizabeth Glaser, who spoke on her experience with AIDS at the 1992 Democratic National Convention, with having "brought AIDS home to America." "A Whisper of AIDS" address has been featured in rhetorical texts including the framed Chambers Book of Speeches. After that appearance, Fisher created a support group for families affected by AIDS and healthcare workers, the Family AIDS Network, and continued speaking as its representative, promoting education, prevention and acceptance of those with AIDS. In October 1992, President George Bush appointed her to the National Commission on AIDS to replace basketball star Magic Johnson. Fisher spoke again at the 1996 Republican National Convention in San Diego, California. Fisher did not return for the 2000 Republican National Convention in Philadelphia, Pennsylvania; she was replaced by fellow AIDS activist (and "abstinence-only" proponent) Patricia Funderburk Ware.

In 1999, Fisher made news when she, like some other HIV-positive people, decided to stop taking anti-HIV medications which she felt were hurting her quality of life. Fisher was convinced that the hostile effects of these medications were not only disrupting her own life but also impacting the well-being of her own family as well, preventing all of them from leading fulfilling lives. Despite these challenges that she faces, Fisher remains under the vigilant care of her physician. She undergoes regular monthly testing to carefully track the level of the virus persisting in her bloodstream, in addition with the status of her immune cells. The diligent monitoring on Fisher underscores her commitment to managing her health condition effectively and making certain that she can continue to prioritize her responsibilities as a parent for her children.

But she and her doctors continued to try new drug combinations and, by 2001, were able to suppress the virus without unmanageable side effects. Finding medications that could prolong healthy life marked a turning point, Fisher said in a 2007 More magazine interview: "For years it was waiting to die, and then it was turning everything around and trying to figure out how to live."

Fisher expanded her AIDS activism from public speaking into writing, art and international advocacy. She founded the non-profit Mary Fisher CARE Fund, based at the Center for AIDS Research at the University of Alabama at Birmingham, to support clinical AIDS research and promote public education about HIV/AIDS medicine and policy. She serves on the leadership council of the Global Coalition on Women and AIDS, and with other HIV-positive women has toured the United States to raise awareness about the disease.

Fisher's international work has focused on Africa and especially Zambia and Rwanda, where she has led fact-finding tours and promoted income-generation projects to employ HIV-positive women. She has taught African women to create handmade jewelry which is then sold online and in U.S. galleries, with profits returned to the women artisans.

== Art and design ==
Fisher's art has been exhibited in public and private collections around the world. Collectors include: President and Mrs. George H. W. Bush, President and Mrs. Gerald Ford, Mrs. Henry Ford II, President and Mrs. Mwanawasa of Zambia, and many others. Seven of her sculptures are displayed at the Geneva, Switzerland, headquarters of UNAIDS, as part of Art for AIDS, a collection created to recognize the role art has played in the response to AIDS. Fisher's work also has been shown at the Gerald R. Ford Presidential Library and Museum.

Fisher is represented year round by Goldenstein Gallery (Uptown Sedona, Arizona). A special show featuring her work, titled "CHI: Art as a Healing Medium", is held annually in November. Fisher speaks in the gallery at least once a year.

She is active with the Sedona Visual Artists Coalition.

Fisher's 1GD bracelet design was inspired by Thomas Morgan's organization called "100 Good Deeds". The 100 Good Deeds collection's goals are to inspire any acts of kindness. Fisher's 1GD bracelet can be purchased on the 100GoodDeeds organizational website. These sales have created additional employment for vulnerable women in Africa.

== Author ==
Fisher is the author of six books. An autobiography called My Name is Mary: A Memoir illustrates the story of her life from childhood to divorce, including learning she contracted HIV from her ex-husband, her alcoholism, and her goal to spread knowledge of AIDS around the world. Other books include: Angels in Our Midst, a photographic tribute to AIDS caregivers; ABATAKA, a collection of her 'AIDS-themed and African-influenced arts works; two books containing transcripts of speeches, "Sleep With the Angels" and "I'll Not Go Quietly"; and in 2012, Messenger: A Self-Portrait (Greenleaf Book Group, Austin, Texas).

Fisher's autobiography, My Name is Mary: A Memoir, was praised by President Ford and Larry Kramer.

Since 2020, Mary has been publishing personal essays on the subjects of society, ethics, and politics on Medium.
