= Jeffrey W. Hutter =

American dentist

- Education: George Washington University; University of Pennsylvania
- Scientific career
- Workplaces: University of Maryland

Jeffrey W. Hutter is an American dentist and a former director of the American Board of Endodontics.

== Biography ==
Hutter obtained a D.M.D. degree from the University of Pennsylvania and a certificate in endodontics from the Naval Dental School. He obtained a master's degree in education and human development from the George Washington University. He is a diplomat and former director of the American Board of Endodontics.

In 1996 he was retired from the United States Navy Dental Corps. Later he became a director of postdoctoral endodontics at the University of Maryland. He served on the scientific advisory board for the Journal of Endodontics. He was a reviewer of both Journal of the American Dental Association and the Journal of Evidence-based Dental Practice. He works at the Boston University Institute for Dental Research. He became the third dean of the Goldman School of Dental Medicine at the Boston University.
