= United Israel Appeal =

American Jewish non-profit organization

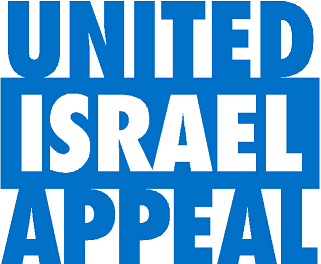
- Founded: 1936; 90 years ago
- Tax ID no.: 13-1760102
- Legal status: 501(c)(3) nonprofit organization
- Headquarters: New York City
- Coordinates: 40.7057809°N 74.0139724°W
- Chairman: Lori Klinghoffer
- Parent organization: Jewish Federations of North America
- Revenue: $158 million (2014)
- Expenses: $166 million (2023)
- Endowment: $128 million
- Website: www.unitedisraelappeal.org
- Formerly called: United Palestine Appeal

United Israel Appeal (UIA), originally named United Palestine Appeal (UPA), is a subsidiary of the Jewish Federations of North America (JFNA) and functions a link between the American Jewish community and the people of Israel. An independent legal entity with 501(c)(3) charity status, and a Board of Directors, United Israel Appeal is responsible for the allocation and oversight of funds raised by United States Jewish federation campaigns on behalf of Israel for use by its operating agent, the Jewish Agency for Israel. It also secures and monitors U.S. grant funds for the immigration and absorption of Jewish refugees and humanitarian migrants to Israel from countries of distress. Partnered with the Jewish Agency for Israel, United Israel Appeal assists American Jews to fulfill their ongoing collective commitment to contribute to and participate in the upbuilding of the State of Israel. United Israel Appeal has offices in New York City and Jerusalem.

== Activities ==
United Israel Appeal's principal objectives are to assist immigration to Israel through the relief, rehabilitation, and resettlement of the immigrants therein, and to aid charitable, educational, and scientific institutions and Jewish-identity programs in Israel.

In consultation with the Jewish Federations of North America (JFNA) and individual Jewish federations, United Israel Appeal nominates members and observers of the Jewish Agency Board of Governors (BOG), members of its committees and designates delegates to the Jewish Agency Annual Assembly.

== History ==
United Israel Appeal was first established in 1925 as the United Palestine Appeal (UPA) to unify Zionist fundraising in America for a Jewish state in Palestine. Its constituents included Keren Hayesod, the fundraising organization for the Jewish Agency; Hadassah; Hebrew University; the Jewish National Fund and Mizrachi. United Palestine Appeal was dissolved in 1930 and reconstituted in 1936 by Keren Hayesod and the Jewish National Fund. In 1938, United Palestine Appeal entered into a partnership with the American Jewish Joint Distribution Committee (JDC) to found the United Jewish Appeal (UJA).

United Israel Appeal has undergone many changes since its early days. In addition to the partnership begun in 1938, the most significant changes prior to 2000 came in 1971 as a result of the reconstitution of the Jewish Agency for Israel. After the Reconstitution Agreement, for the first time, American Jewish leaders from federations, as well as all the American Zionist organizations, served as members of the United Israel Appeal's board of directors. The American Zionist organizations had seats on the Jewish Agency Board through their membership in the World Zionist Organization.

The Reconstitution Agreement led United Israel Appeal to name the Jewish Agency for Israel as its exclusive operating agent in Israel.

In 1999, United Jewish Communities was created as a merger of United Israel Appeal, United Jewish Appeal, and the Council of Jewish Federations, into a single, national organization. After this merger, United Israel Appeal became a subsidiary of United Jewish Communities, which itself was later renamed the Jewish Federations of North America.

== Leadership ==
Chairs have included American billionaire and businessman Les Wexner, as well as Andy Groveman of Memphis, Cynthia D. Shapira of Pittsburgh, Richard N. Bernstein of Miami, Bruce A. Arbit of Milwaukee; Richard L. Wexler of Chicago, Jane Fisher Sherman of Detroit, Bennett L. Aaron of Philadelphia, and Shoshana S. Cardin of Baltimore.
