= Max Fisher =

American businessman and philanthropist (1908–2005)

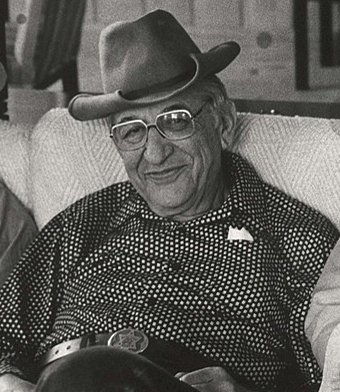
- Born: Max Martin Fisher; July 15, 1908; Pittsburgh, Pennsylvania, U.S.
- Died: March 3, 2005 (aged 96); Franklin, Michigan, U.S.
- Resting place: Clover Hill Park Cemetery, Birmingham, Michigan, U.S.
- Occupations: Businessman and philanthropist
- Spouses: Sylvia Krell (m. 1934; died 1952) Marjorie Switow (m. 1953)
- Children: 5, including Mary
- Relatives: Stephen M. Ross (nephew)
- Website: maxmfisher.org

Max Martin Fisher (July 15, 1908 – March 3, 2005) was an American businessman and philanthropist, and presidential advisor. Fisher founded Aurora Gasoline, an oil company that owned Speedway gas stations. After selling the company, he was chairman of United Brands, now Chiquita, and several other companies and invested in large-scale real estate projects.

A major fundraiser for Republican Party candidates, Fisher was an advisor on Middle East and Jewish issues to every administration from President Dwight D. Eisenhower to President George W. Bush.

Fisher spent much of his life raising money for philanthropic endeavors. For more than forty years, he led civic organizations, organized business leaders, and helmed investment efforts in Detroit. Outside Michigan, he supported American Jewish and Israeli causes.

== Life and career ==
Fisher was born in Pittsburgh, Pennsylvania, to Russian Jewish immigrant parents and grew up in Salem, Ohio, where his father owned a clothing store. He attended Ohio State University on a football scholarship and graduated with a degree in business administration in 1930. While a student at OSU, he was initiated into the Alpha Epsilon chapter of the Phi Beta Delta fraternity, which is now part of the Pi Lambda Phi fraternity.

In 1930, Fisher joined his father's Keystone Oil Refining Company, a motor oil reclamation business, in Detroit as a $15-a-week salesman before forming his own company in 1932. He grew the business, Aurora Gasoline, into one of the largest gas station chains in the Midwest before selling the business in 1959 to Marathon Petroleum for $40 million. After retiring from management in 1963, he sat on the board of Comerica, the consumer and investment bank, Sotheby's, and United Brands.

Fisher reinvested his fortune in major real estate deals. In 1977, he joined with Taubman and Henry Ford II to buy the 73,000-acre (300 km^{2}) Irvine Ranch south of Los Angeles for $337 million; Fisher's group would sell the property six years later for an estimated $1 billion.

For decades, Fisher served as a trusted advisor to U.S. presidents and Israeli prime ministers, rallying for causes from the Six-Day War to Ethiopian Jewry. By quietly forging new ties between Washington and Jerusalem, he pioneered a new era in American Jewish activism and politics and was considered the elder statesman of North American Jewry. In 1975, he was asked to personally mend relations between the Gerald Ford administration and Israeli leadership. Jimmy Carter invited him to watch the signing of the Camp David Accords in 1977.

From the 1960s through the 1980s, Fisher was one of the most successful fundraisers for the Republican Party. He was a delegate from Michigan at the 1964, 1968, and 1976 Republican National Conventions, and an alternate in the 1988 Republican National Convention.

== Philanthropic activities ==
=== Jewish organizations ===
Fisher supported Jewish and general causes worldwide and played a major role in almost every major Jewish communal organization. Fisher served as national chairman of UJC's predecessor organizations, the United Jewish Appeal (UJA) from 1965 to 1967; president of the Council of Jewish Federations from 1969 to 1972; and chairman of the United Israel Appeal, Inc. (UIA) from 1968 to 1971; and president of the Jewish Federation of Metropolitan Detroit from 1959 to 1964. He served as Honorary Chairman of United Jewish Communities (UJC), Council of Jewish Federations, and the American Jewish Committee.

In addition to being honorary chair of UJC, he was founding chairman of the board of governors of UJC's overseas partner, the Jewish Agency for Israel (JAFI). He was also active in the American Jewish Committee, B'nai B'rith International, and Hebrew Immigrant Aid Society.

=== Detroit ===
In Detroit, Fisher backed the $60 million Max. M. Fisher Music Center, which serves as the home for the Detroit Symphony Orchestra and includes a public high school for the performing arts center called The Max.

=== Ohio State University ===
He also donated around $20 million to finance Ohio State University's Fisher College of Business for development of a new six-building business campus that opened in 1998. An additional pledge of $5 million was given to the Fisher College of Business in February 2005 to support Master of Business Administration programs.

== Personal life and family ==
Fisher was married twice:

In 1934, he married Sylvia Krell who died in 1952. They had one child, Jane Fisher Sherman, former chairman of the United Israel Appeal, Inc. (UIA) and former co-chair of the Jewish Agency for Israel Committee on Israel.

In 1953, he married Marjorie Faith Switow. They had two children together: Julie Fisher Cummings and Marjorie Fisher Aronow. Switow also had two children from her prior husband, George Allen Frehling, whom Fisher adopted: Mary Fisher, AIDS activist and Philip William Fisher, who founded the charity Mission Throttle

Fisher has 15 grandchildren and 13 great-grandchildren. Fisher financed the schooling of his nephew Stephen M. Ross, who called him, "the most important role model and inspiration for me in life".

He died March 3, 2005, at about 11:30 am in his home in Franklin, Michigan, surrounded by family. He is interred at the Clover Hill Park Cemetery in Birmingham, Michigan.

== Wealth ==
In 2004, Max Fisher had amassed a net worth of $775 million. At 96, he was the oldest member of the Forbes 400.

== Legacy ==
Fisher was the subject of articles, debates, TV documentaries, and an authorized biography, Quiet Diplomat by Peter Golden.

=== Historical documents ===
Max Fisher's papers are available for public research at the Walter P. Reuther Library in Detroit, Michigan. The library's website explains that, "This large collection documents Fisher's life and career as a successful Detroit industrialist and investor, influential Republican Party fundraiser and power broker, Jewish community leader, and major philanthropist. It includes correspondence, documents, speeches, interviews, photographs and other media, and documents from his biographer."

=== BBYO Involvement ===
In March 2006, a male chapter of BBYO was founded by 12 young men from the state of Michigan with the name of Max Fisher AZA (AZA standing for Aleph Zadik Aleph, the male sector of the organization). Following the foundation, the chapter was officially recognized by the Fisher Foundation in early April. The chapter's charter number is #337. Since Fisher's charter in 2006, the chapter has flourished at the chapter, regional, and international level.

Each year several members represent Michigan Region by attending BBYO's International Convention in February, and by attending countless summer programs around the globe each summer, many of which focus on building leadership skills. Fisher has won several awards, including the Henry Monsky award which recognizes the most outstanding chapters across the International Order. On a more local level, each year several Fishermen apply for individual awards including the Bronze and Silver Stars of David (recognizing outstanding participation) and the Tree of Life Award (recognizes those individuals who bring more members into the order via recruiting). Additional awards are available for those who excel in community service as well. Recently, Fisher has received publicity for starting a Platform Database which hosts several hundred platforms of individuals' candidacy for office from around the world. The platforms range from the chapter level, to the regional and international levels as well.

=== Telegraph Road ===
On November 30, 2005, President George W. Bush signed the 2006 appropriations bill related to the US Department of Transportation and other agencies. Contained in that law was a provision that named a 30-mile (48 km) stretch of Telegraph Road (U.S. Route 24) from I-96 to its northern end at I-75 the "Max M. Fisher Memorial Highway"; the highway was dedicated in May 2008.
