= Convention bounce =

Increase in support for US presidential candidates

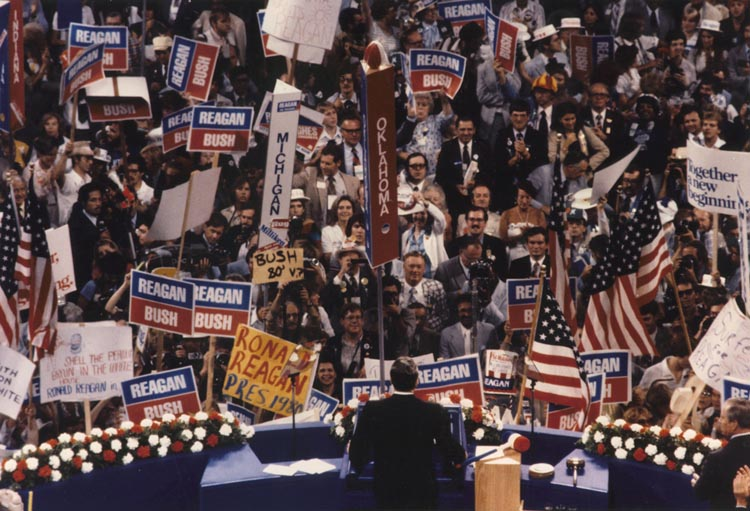
Ronald Reagan addresses the 1980 GOP convention. Reagan saw a big boost in the polls after his acceptance speech, but his opponent, President Jimmy Carter, got an equally large bump after his convention four weeks later.

A convention bounce or convention bump refers to an increase in support that U.S. presidential candidates in the Republican or Democratic party typically enjoy after the televised national convention of their party. A presumptive nominee for president may also be said to experience a "VP bounce" after announcing their pick for vice president prior to the convention. The size and impact of convention bumps vary, but presidential candidates usually see at least a small uptick in their polling numbers coming out of their conventions.

== History of convention bounces ==
=== 1992 ===
Bill Clinton benefited from one of the largest bumps in history after the Democratic National Convention in 1992, climbing by as many as 30 points in the polls, however this was assisted by Independent Ross Perot, who at the time was polling at 20%, withdrawing from the race during the Democratic convention. Incumbent President George H. W. Bush's convention bounce was weak by comparison. Some party leaders blaming former primary challenger Pat Buchanan's fiery and divisive speech, which aired in primetime due to a scheduling delay.

=== 2000 ===
Al Gore's 2000 bounce endured for weeks. Prior to the Democratic convention, Gore was behind Texas Gov. George W. Bush by as many as 16 points, but was in a statistical tie with the Republican the weekend after his acceptance speech.

=== 2004 ===
Democratic candidate John Kerry did not get a convention bounce in 2004.

=== 2008 ===
Polls indicated a small bounce for 2008 Democratic presidential nominee Barack Obama after his party's convention in August, but as expected, much of it evaporated during and after the Republican convention the week following, yielding GOP candidate John McCain a small lead in several polls. Nielsen ratings revealed that year's party conventions to be the most-watched ever, with the Republican convention narrowly trumping the Democrats'.

=== 2012 ===
The RealClearPolitics polling index revealed the 2012 convention bounces for President Obama and GOP challenger Mitt Romney to be comparably smaller than in past elections. Though Romney pulled even with Obama during that year's Republican convention at the end of August, Obama opened up a three- or four-point lead during the Democratic convention the week after.

=== 2016 ===
In 2016, news sources and polls differed greatly on the size of the convention bounces received by Republican Donald Trump and Democrat Hillary Clinton after their respective conventions; however, the RealClearPolitics polling index showed both candidates trending upward leading up to and after their acceptance speeches. Clinton's bounce lasted somewhat longer than Trump's.

=== 2020 ===
Democratic candidate Joe Biden, who held the lead over incumbent Republican Trump entering the Democratic convention, did not get a convention bounce, with a CNBC-Change Research poll also indicating that the race had instead tightened in the swing states. Republican candidate Donald Trump similarly did not receive a convention bounce after the Republican convention with a CNN poll indicating that the race remained unchanged after both conventions.

=== 2024 ===
Similarly to 2020, no clear convention bounce was observed for either former president Donald Trump, the Republican nominee, or Vice President Kamala Harris, the Democratic nominee. A convention bounce for Trump was considered hard to measure due to the impact of President Joe Biden's withdrawal from the race on July 21, 2024, only three days after the convention ended on July 18, as well as the attempted assassination of Donald Trump on July 13, though some polls showed an increase in favorability for Trump. Harris also did not receive a convention bounce after the Democratic National Convention, with some speculating that her "bounce" had already occurred at the onset of her candidacy following the withdrawal of Joe Biden.
