= Chicken fat =

Animal fat from domestic chicken

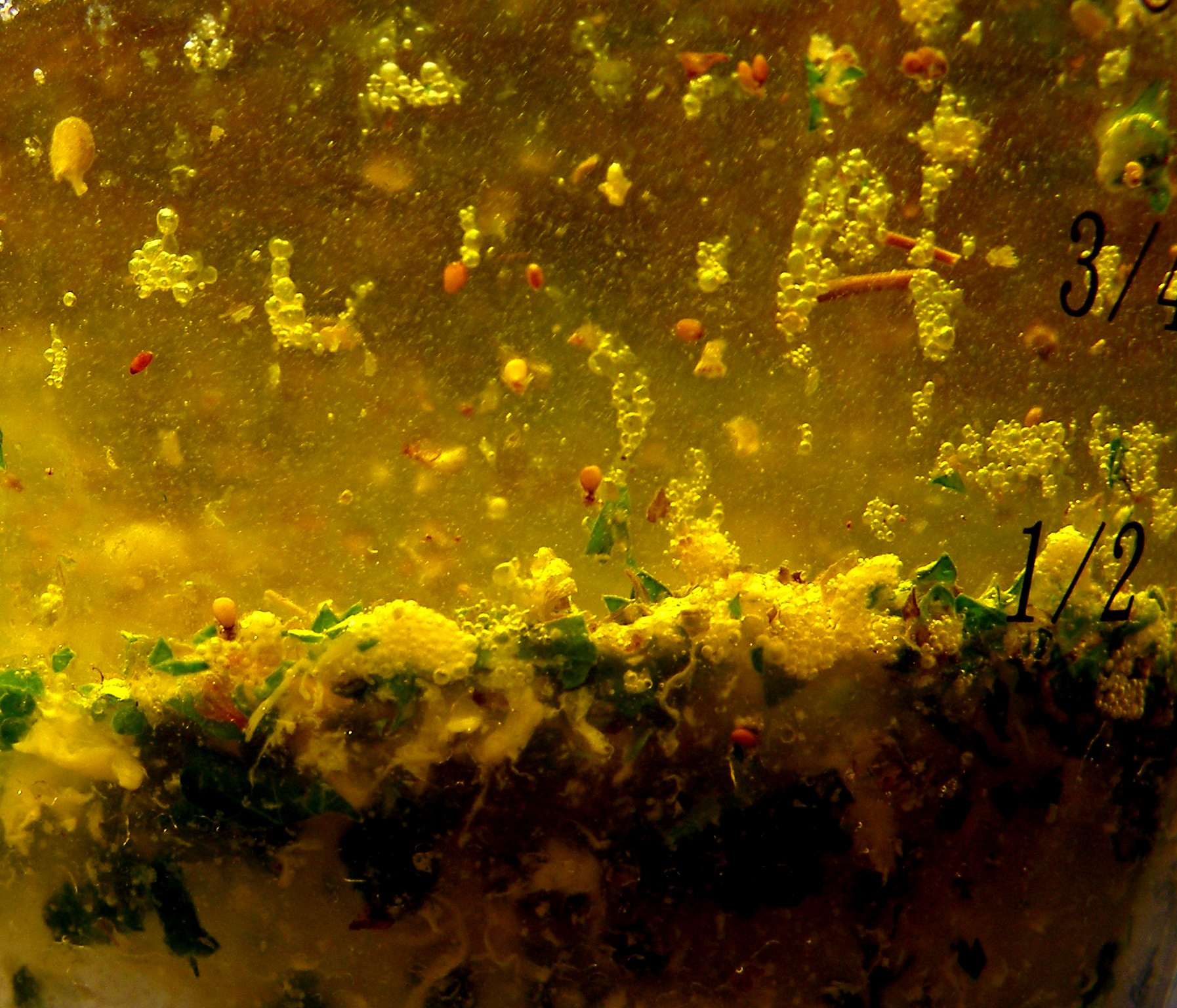
Chicken fat

Chicken fat is fat obtained (usually as a by-product) from chicken rendering and processing. Of the many animal-sourced substances, chicken fat is noted for being high in linoleic acid, an omega-6 fatty acid. Linoleic acid levels are between 17.9% and 22.8%. It is a common flavoring, additive or main component of chicken soup. It is often used in pet foods, and has been used in the production of biodiesel. One method of converting chicken fat into biodiesel is through a process called supercritical methanol treatment.

== Culinary uses ==
Most uses for chicken fat come after its rendering process. The rendering process can be done several ways but the most common is by putting it in a pan to melt. Rendered chicken fat is also referred to as schmaltz. Once rendered, it can be used similarly to oil or butter in a pan or it can be whipped for spreading.

== Nutrition ==
An article published in Lipids in Health and Disease looked at the levels of cholesterol, protein and saturated fats within different parts of the chicken. Chicken with and without skin were compared, and it was found that the chicken with skin was higher in cholesterol and unsaturated fats. The chicken that contained no skin and had the breast meat with the natural amount of fat was high in protein and low in cholesterol.

== Biofuel ==
There are two primary methods by which to extract biofuel from chicken fat: transesterification and supercritical methanol treatment.

Transesterification uses alcohol to form esters and glycerol then uses a catalyst to yield a faster reaction. Supercritical methanol treatment does not require a catalyst and dissolves the waste body product with high temperatures and pressure.

Transesterification has been used with other animal body waste products, such as chicken skin, but chicken fat yields more biofuel in the end product. Through the process, two separate layers form—one red and the other yellow, the red being the glycerol and the yellow being the biofuel.

Supercritical methanol treatment has similar results; however, it does not require the use of a catalyst to yield biodiesel. Rather than form two layers, it equalizes the glycerol as a vapor and the biodiesel as a liquid.

== See also ==
- Schmaltz, rendered fat that may be made from chicken fat
