= David C. Watts =

British biophysicist, material scientist, and academic

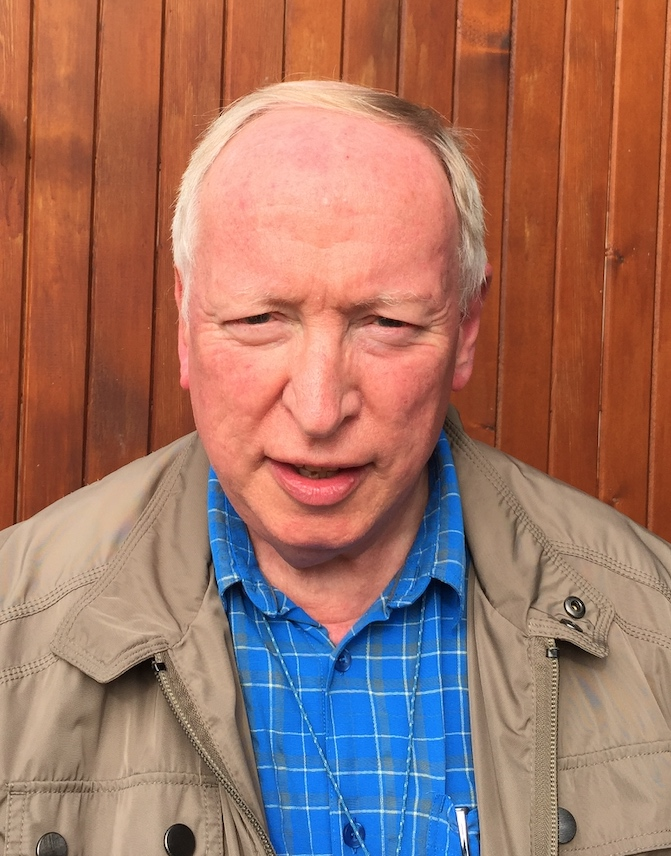
- Born: 7 April 1945 (age 81); Manchester
- Occupations: Biophysicist, material scientist, and academic
- Awards: Distinguished Scientist Award, International Association for Dental Research; Humboldt Research Prize, Alexander von Humboldt Foundation; President’s Prize, UK Society for Biomaterials; Alan Wilson Memorial Lecture Award, UK Society for Biomaterials; Founders’ Award, Academy of Dental Materials

Academic background
- Education: University of Wales; University of Manchester

Academic work
- Institutions: University of Manchester

David Christopher Watts (born 7 April 1945) is a British biophysicist, material scientist, and academic. He is a professor of Biomaterials Science at the University of Manchester, and a Biomaterials Consultant at BIOMAN Materials Consultants.

Watts has received recognition for his work on dielectric spectroscopy and molecular relaxation processes, as well as for his current work on the interdisciplinary science of oral biomaterials, particularly the understanding of photo-polymerised composite materials. He is the co-discoverer of the Kohlrausch-Williams-Watts [KWW] stretched-exponential function for modelling molecular-relaxation processes in condensed media, and has been awarded numerous awards for his research work in the field.

Watts is a Fellow of the Institute of Physics, the Royal Society of Chemistry, the Academy of Dental Materials, and the Royal Society of Biology. He has been the Editor-in-Chief of Dental Materials - Journal for oral and craniofacial biomaterials sciences since 1998.

== Early life and education ==
Watts was born on 7 April 1945, in Manchester. After completing his early education at Cheadle Hulme School, he enrolled at the University of Wales and graduated with majors in Physics and Chemistry in 1967. From 1967 until 1970, he undertook research in polymer science for a Ph.D. at the University of Wales, under the supervision of Graham Williams. His dissertation was titled The dielectric behavior of polymers. Between 1978 and 1983, Watts completed biblical language and literature courses at the University of Manchester.

== Career ==
Following his doctoral degree, Watts started his academic career at Sandbach School, Cheshire, where he taught chemistry, Physics and Religious Education until 1972. He held his next appointment as a Research Associate in the Chemistry Department at the University of Manchester in 1972, and was promoted in the Medical Faculty to Lecturer in Biomaterials Science in 1976, and to Senior Lecturer in 1983. He was then appointed there as Reader in 1992, and became a professor in 2000.

He is concurrently appointed as Adjunct Research Professor in Biomaterials and Biomechanics at Oregon Health and Science University, and as an Honorary faculty Member of the Center for Mechanics of Biological Materials at the University of Padova.

Watts has served as a UK Principal Expert to International Standards Organization Technical Committee 106 (Dentistry), on ceramics, composite materials, adhesion and photo-polymerization from 1986 to 2011.

== Research ==
Watts has authored over 500 publications. His research focus includes dielectric spectroscopy and molecular relaxation processes. With collaboration of international biomaterials companies, he works extensively on photo-polymerisation, the setting mechanisms of dental and orthopaedic biomaterials, the kinetics of these processes, biomimetic-composites and biomaterial interactions with hard tissues along with development of specialist research instrumentation for biomaterials.

=== Polymer physics ===
Watts's work on the discovery of the Williams-Watts [or KWW] "stretched exponential" relaxation function for condensed media, was first used in 19th century to describe charge decay in the Leyden jar and creep in fibres. This work has been identified by Graham Williams and Watts in the dielectric behavior of solid polymers and mathematically re-expressed by Fourier transformation in forms appropriate to the analysis of both time and frequency domain measurements. Their invention also contributes to Theory of the Glass transition. and has been interpreted as a fractal-time stochastic process.

In the 1970s, Williams and Watts published non-symmetrical dielectric relaxation behaviour resulting from a simple empirical decay function. A fine agreement was established between empirical representation and the resulting experimental curves for the α relaxation in polyethyl acrylate, and highlighted that this representation would have a general application to the α relaxations in other polymers. Later on, he conducted a study to explore the differences between initial and final fracture failure loads of metal-free crown systems by the conjoint detection of acoustic emission signals during compressive loading. Having discussed these differences, he provided a general overview of the bond-disruptive stresses, concerning resin composite formulations, origins of stress, and clinical consequences of stress development. He also characterised the Young's moduli (E) of a series of model dental resin-composites using nanoindentation, and examined how E was influenced by differences in filler-size and shape.

=== Biomaterials ===
Watts's research on biomaterials is significant to the genesis and development of new and improved biomedical materials. In his research, he regarded the penetration of visible light into dental biomaterials as an essential factor in photoinitiation of setting reactions and in the optical aspects of dental aesthetics. He also focused his study on exploring the impact of light intensity on resin-composite degree of conversion and shrinkage strain. It was indicated that correlation between DC and shrinkage strain values means that some reductions in the problems of shrinkage may be achieved by an acceptable reduction in DC. While using Vickers hardness profiles (VHN), he determined post-cure depth of cure of bulk fill resin composites and highlighted that these bulk fill resin composites can be cured to an acceptable post-cure depth.

== Awards and honors ==
- 2002 - Doctor of Science (h.c.) University of Athens
- 2003 - Distinguished Scientist Award, International Association for Dental Research
- 2010 - Humboldt Research Prize, Alexander von Humboldt Foundation
- 2011 - President's Prize, UK Society for Biomaterials
- 2017 - Alan D. Wilson Memorial Lecture Award, UK Society for Biomaterials
- 2017 - Founders’ Award, Academy of Dental Materials

== Personal life ==
Watts is a practicing Christian, which is his motivation for participation in both the scientific enterprise and the theology of science. He has a Free Church background but currently is a member of the Anglican Church within which he has led a parish and diocesan project on Scientists in Congregations (2016–17) to promote constructive engagement between Christians and scientists. He is an active mountaineer and alpinist, as an elected member of the Alpine Club, and the Swiss Alpine Club.

== Bibliography ==
- Williams, G., & Watts, D. C. (1970). Non-symmetrical dielectric relaxation behaviour arising from a simple empirical decay function. Transactions of the Faraday society, 66, 80–85.
- Williams, G., Watts, D. C., Dev, S. B., & North, A. M. (1971). Further considerations of non symmetrical dielectric relaxation behaviour arising from a simple empirical decay function. Transactions of the faraday Society, 67, 1323–1335.
- Watts, D. C., & Cash, A. J. (1991). Determination of polymerization shrinkage kinetics in visible-light-cured materials: methods development. Dental Materials, 7(4), 281–287.
- Silikas, N., Eliades, G., & Watts, D. C. (2000). Light intensity effects on resin-composite degree of conversion and shrinkage strain. Dental Materials, 16(4), 292–296.
- Watts, D. C., Marouf, A. S., Al-Hindi, A. M. (2003). Photo-polymerization shrinkage-stress kinetics in resin-composites: methods development. Dental Materials, 19(1), 1–11.
- Alrahlah, A., Silikas, N., & Watts, D. C. (2014). Post-cure depth of cure of bulk fill dental resin-composites. Dental materials, 30(2), 149–154.
