= David W. Dunlap =

American journalist (born 1952)

David William Dunlap
- Born: May 10, 1952 (age 74); San Francisco, California, US
- Education: Yale University
- Occupation: Journalist
- Employer: The New York Times

David William Dunlap (born 1952) is an American journalist who worked as a reporter for The New York Times. He wrote a regular column, Building Blocks, that looked at the New York metropolitan area through its architecture, infrastructure, spaces, and places.

== Career ==
Born in San Francisco, California, on May 10, 1952, Dunlap extensively documented the rebuilding of the World Trade Center after the September 11 attacks in 2001. He began writing about landmarks in 1981, when he was evicted from the New York Biltmore Hotel so that he would not be able to see its interior being demolished.

He began his career as a clerk to James Reston in 1975, became a graphics editor in 1976, and then reporter in 1981. Between 1994 and 1999, Dunlap covered gay, lesbian, and AIDS issues for The New York Times. He was the first reporter to officially cover the "gay and lesbian beat". The New York Times decided to officially document news about gay and lesbian communities after the AIDS-related death of Times reporter Jeffrey Schmalz in November 1993. Dunlap was sometimes criticized for covering the news from a politically left-leaning position. He retired from The Times in December 2017.

Dunlap is currently documenting the history of Provincetown, Massachusetts, through its architecture, on the website Building Provincetown 2020. The website expands on Dunlap's 2015 book Building Provincetown, and began to mark the 400th anniversary of Mayflower ships arrival in Provincetown.

== Awards ==
Dunlap won the Citation of Excellence award from the American Institute of Architects. In 1992, he received the American Planning Association's New York Metro Chapter journalism award; other winners have included Brendan Gill, Paul Goldberger, Kenneth T. Jackson, and Elizabeth Kolbert.

== Books ==
- Building Provincetown: A Guide to Its Social and Cultural History, Told Through Its Architecture. Town of Provincetown, Provincetown Historical Commission. 2015. ISBN 9780692426715.
- Dunlap, David W. (2004). From Abyssinian to Zion: A Guide to Manhattan's Houses of Worship. Columbia University Press. doi:10.7312/dunl12542. ISBN 9780231500722.
- Glory in Gotham: Manhattan's Houses of Worship: A Guide to Their History, Architecture and Legacy. City and Company. 2004. ISBN 9781929439010.
- On Broadway: A Journey Uptown Over Time. Rizzoli International. 1990. ISBN 9780847811816.
- Goldberger, Paul (1979). The City Observed: New York. Random House. ISBN 9780394504506. (Dunlap was the photographer.)

== See also ==
- LGBT culture in New York City
- List of LGBT people from New York City
- National September 11 Memorial & Museum
- NYC Pride March
