= Martin Gaffney =

United States Marine Corps officer (1949–1991)

- Born: Martin Francis Gaffney; January 17, 1949; Massachusetts, US
- Died: November 1, 1991 (aged 42); Boston, Massachusetts, US

Martin Francis Gaffney (January 17, 1949 – November 1, 1991) was an American Marine who successfully sued the United States government on behalf of his wife's estate for causing the death of his wife Mutsuko Gaffney, one son, and eventually himself by infecting them with HIV after Mutsuko got a blood transfusion at a Naval Hospital in 1981.

== Background ==
Martin Gaffney was born in Massachusetts United States in 1949. He enlisted in the United States Marine Corps in 1975 in Lowell, Massachusetts and would eventually rise to the rank of Chief Warrant Officer (CWO4).

In 1978 on the Japanese island of Okinawa, Martin met Mutsuko Kuniyoshi. In late 1980 Mutsuko became pregnant with the couple's first child. On March 7, 1981 she and Martin married.

== Stillbirth of son and wife's infection with HIV ==
It was in September 1981 that Mutsuko Gaffney went to Long Beach Naval Hospital. In spite of her saying she felt labor pains, medical personnel sent the mother home on several occasions over a span of five weeks. Six weeks after Mutsuko's due date, she returned to the hospital. It was during tests that it was discovered the baby Mutsuko was carrying no longer had a heartbeat, and naval doctors performed an emergency caesarean section but it was too late for the boy Mutsuko was carrying, who weighed 12 pounds. As a result of the operation, Mutsuko was given a transfusion of two units of blood.

Years later it was discovered that one of the blood donors had been discharged from the United States Navy for homosexual activity. The other donor tested negative for HIV. At the time of Mutsuko Gaffney's transfusion, there were no blood screening tests for the virus. It was also discovered that the donors had donated blood the day before Mutsuko Gaffney's caesarean section was performed. It is possible that she would not have been infected with HIV if Navy doctors had treated her and the unborn child she was carrying in a timely manner.

== AIDS diagnosis and federal lawsuit ==
In 1983 and 1985 Mutsuko Gaffney gave birth again - first to a daughter named Maureene and then a son named John. John was a sickly child and tests were done to find out why. It was discovered John had HIV, and had gotten it from his mother who also tested positive for the disease. Mr. Gaffney recalled the reaction of his wife, to the news she had AIDS: Mutsuko turned to the doctor and asked for enough sleeping pills to commit suicide, he said.

John Gaffney died at the age of thirteen months in August 1986. Mutsuko Gaffney died of AIDS on May 31, 1987.

Maureene Gaffney was tested for HIV but the results were negative.

Martin Gaffney tested positive for HIV but was not yet showing symptoms when he filed a medical malpractice lawsuit against the federal government in 1988. In April 1989 a federal court ruled in Martin Gaffney's favor. U.S. District Judge Rya Zobel stating "infection with a communicable disease was a foreseeable consequence of administering blood to a patient even in 1981."

Martin Gaffney was awarded $3.8 million by a jury but the federal government was initially slow in paying the judgment. By 1991, he had come down with lymphoma. On October 10, 1991, the government decided not to appeal the judgment. Less than a month later, Gaffney died in a Boston hospital.

After the death of her father, Maureene Gaffney went to live with her paternal uncle, John Gaffney.

== See also ==
Elizabeth Glaser, like Mutsuko Gaffney, was infected via a transfusion with tainted blood and also had 2 children contract HIV from their mother in utero.
