= 1992 Democratic National Convention =

Political convention

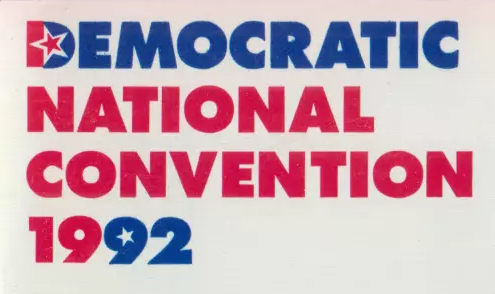
- 1992 presidential election

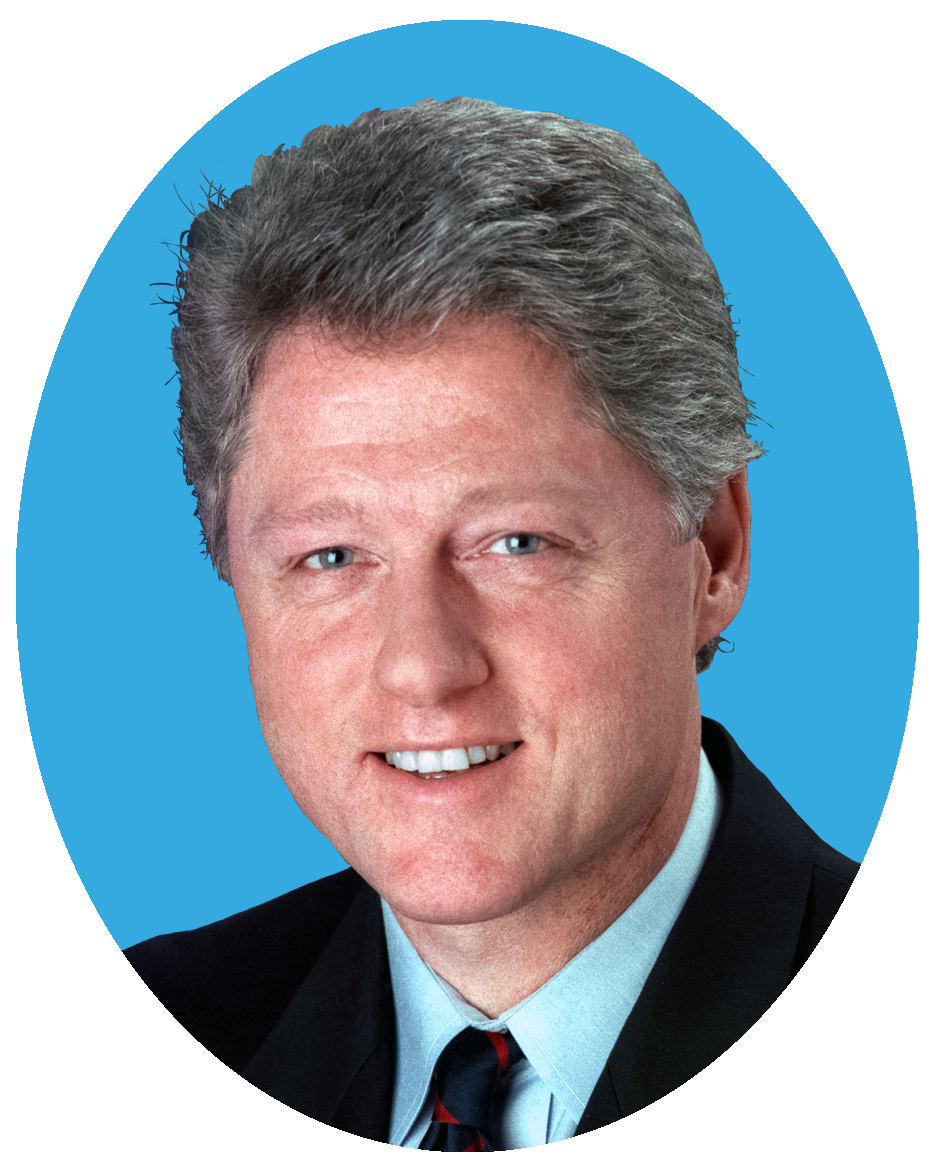
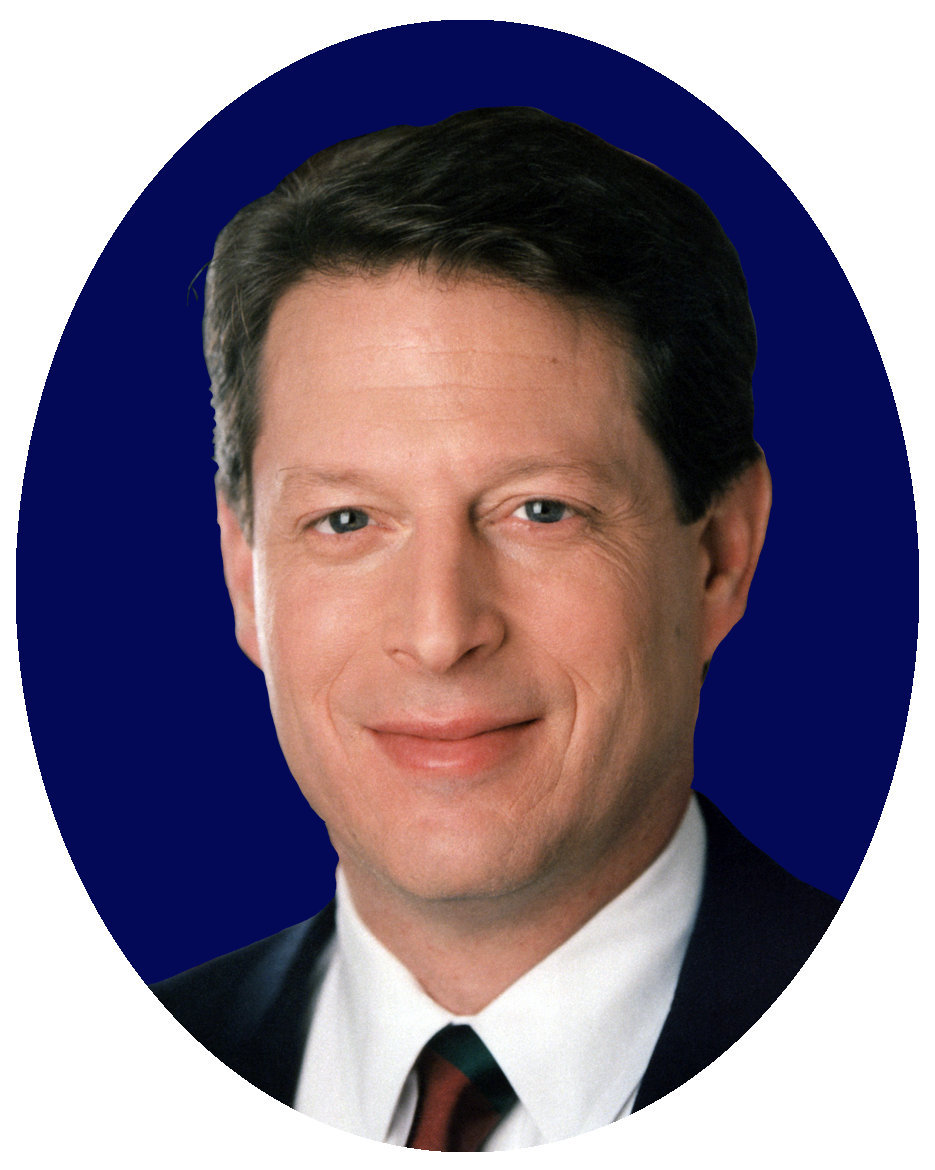
- Nominees; Clinton and Gore

Convention
- Date(s): July 13–16, 1992
- City: New York, New York
- Venue: Madison Square Garden
- Keynote speaker: Zell Miller, Barbara Jordan, and Bill Bradley

Candidates
- Presidential nominee: Bill Clinton of Arkansas
- Vice-presidential nominee: Al Gore of Tennessee

Voting
- Total delegates: 4,288
- Votes needed for nomination: 2,145
- Results (president): Clinton (AR): 3,372 (78.64%); Brown (CA): 596 (13.90%); Tsongas (MA): 209 (4.87%); Casey (PA): 10 (0.23%); Schroeder (CO): 8 (0.19%); Agran (CA): 3 (0.07%); Others: 56 (1.31%)
- Ballots: 1

The 1992 Democratic National Convention nominated Governor Bill Clinton of Arkansas for president and Senator Al Gore of Tennessee for vice president; Clinton had announced Gore as his running mate on July 9, 1992. The convention was held at Madison Square Garden in New York City, New York, from July 13 to July 16, 1992. The Clinton–Gore ticket then faced and defeated the Republican ticket of President George H. W. Bush and Vice President Dan Quayle, as well as the independent ticket of Ross Perot and James Stockdale, in the 1992 presidential election.

The convention, organized by Democratic National Committee chairman Ron Brown, was widely seen as a success. Contemporary commentary emphasized that, unlike many earlier Democratic conventions, it was tightly stage-managed and produced little open floor drama; one Los Angeles Times analysis called it a convention with "no news" from the floor, meaning no walkouts, no platform fights, no credentials battles, and no rules challenges. As Clinton finished his acceptance speech, Fleetwood Mac's "Don't Stop", which became the theme song of his 1992 campaign, was played during the balloon drop and celebration.

Clinton also received a significant convention bounce from the convention, aided by the favorable press coverage it generated and by Perot's withdrawal from the race on the morning of July 16. A contemporaneous Washington Post-ABC News poll found Clinton surging into the lead during the convention itself. The boost helped establish a lead that survived the remainder of the race, even after Perot re-entered in October.

== Site selection ==
New York City was selected as the convention host in July 1990. In the final stage of the site-selection process, the Democratic Party narrowed the field to New York and New Orleans. Party officials said New York had offered an especially attractive package, including fundraising advantages tied to New York, New Jersey, and Connecticut donors, while New Orleans' bid had been hurt by labor concerns and by controversy surrounding a recently passed Louisiana abortion bill. On July 11, 1990, Ron Brown formally announced New York as the host city.

The convention marked New York's fifth time hosting a Democratic National Convention and Madison Square Garden's third time serving as the venue for a Democratic convention in the modern television era, after 1976 and 1980.

== Preparations and logistics ==
Convention planners treated the physical layout of Madison Square Garden as part of the event's television strategy. Because fewer than a quarter of the delegates could fit on the floor, many were placed in elevated spectator seating and in the arena's end zones; however, the tighter configuration was also expected to create a more intimate television image than a larger, looser venue might have produced.

The convention also featured a 17-foot "video wall" behind the lectern, a relatively novel visual element at the time, used to introduce speakers and run taped segments. According to contemporaneous convention figures summarized by the Los Angeles Times, the convention involved 4,288 delegates, 640 alternates, roughly 15,000 media representatives, 500 foreign dignitaries, 3,000 police officers, and an estimated $473 million economic impact for New York City. The same report noted that the delegate body was evenly split by gender, with 50 percent male and 50 percent female delegates.

== Atmosphere and strategy ==
The convention was designed above all to launch Clinton into the general election while minimizing intraparty conflict. Clinton had already secured the nomination before the convention opened, but party leaders still had to manage the residual presence of Jerry Brown delegates, anti-abortion Democrats angered by the party platform, and unease among some liberals over the Clinton–Gore ticket's centrist positioning.

That management produced a convention widely described as unusually smooth. The Los Angeles Times argued after the fact that the Democrats had "finally got what [they had] wanted—a convention with no news," meaning that almost all potentially disruptive stories fizzled or were quickly absorbed into the larger show of unity.

The only genuinely major national news event during the convention happened outside Madison Square Garden. On the morning of July 16, Perot announced that he was suspending his independent presidential campaign. According to later convention analyses, that decision gave Clinton an additional advantage by shifting media attention to the Democratic ticket on the same day Clinton accepted the nomination.

== Speakers ==
The convention's keynote role was divided, in an unusual departure from custom, among three speakers: Georgia Governor Zell Miller, New Jersey Senator Bill Bradley, and former Texas Representative Barbara Jordan, who had also delivered a keynote address at the 1976 Democratic National Convention.

New York Governor Mario Cuomo delivered the nominating speech for Clinton on the convention's third night. The convention also featured speeches by former President Jimmy Carter, the Rev. Jesse Jackson, DNC chairman Ron Brown, and AIDS activist Elizabeth Glaser.

Prominently featured as speakers during the convention were Democratic Party women. The Tuesday night program was built around what many participants and reporters called the "Year of the Woman," spotlighting female candidates and women's issues in prime time. Barbara Mikulski appeared with a large group of female Senate candidates, including Carol Moseley Braun, Barbara Boxer, and Patty Murray, and the convention featured remarks by women such as Ann Richards, Pat Schroeder, and Kathleen Brown.

Former California Governor Jerry Brown, who remained an active candidate and still controlled a substantial bloc of delegates, was not assigned a major speaking slot by the convention organizers, but he did appear in order to second his own nomination and continue arguing for what he called a "humility agenda".

=== Clinton's acceptance speech ===
Bill Clinton's acceptance speech

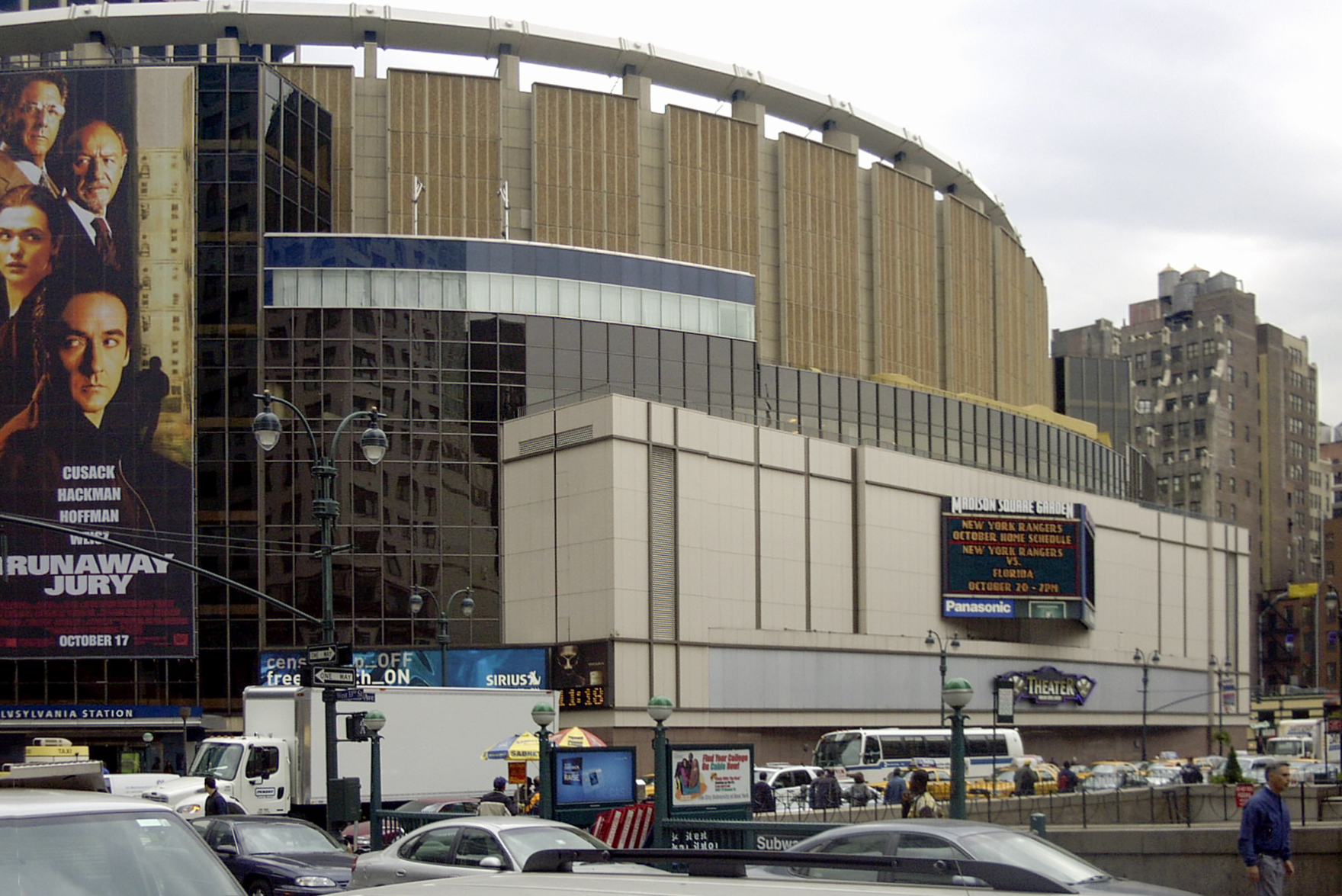
Madison Square Garden, the site of the 1992 Democratic National Convention

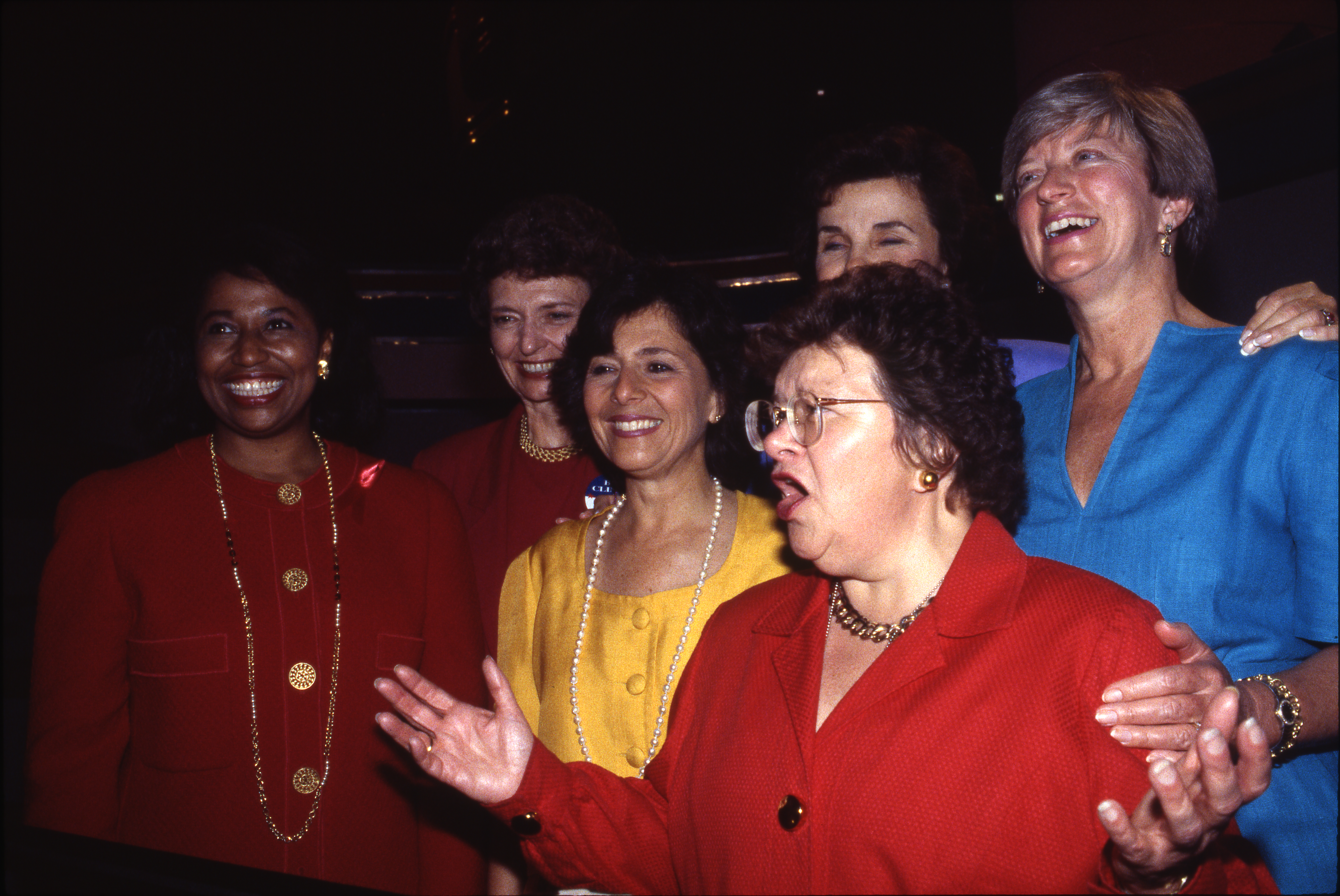
Senator Barbara Mikulski with female Senate candidates

Clinton's acceptance speech on July 16 served as the campaign's main pivot into the general election. He opened by joking that he had run for president because he "wanted to come back to this convention and finish that speech I started four years ago," a reference to his poorly received address at the 1988 Democratic National Convention. He then framed his candidacy around "hope for the future," faith in the American people, and his proposed "New Covenant" between citizens and government.

The speech also incorporated the imagery that would become most closely associated with Clinton's rise. In discussing his upbringing, he told delegates that his grandfather had run "a country store in our little town of Hope", and he later declared that he still believed "in a place called Hope". The speech emphasized jobs, health care, middle-class tax relief, and governmental reform, and it explicitly defended abortion rights under Roe v. Wade.

Clinton also used the speech to appeal directly to Perot supporters, citing Perot's own comment earlier that day that the Democrats had become "a revitalized Democratic Party".

=== Casey controversy ===
Pennsylvania Governor Bob Casey wanted to speak at the convention, but ultimately did not. Casey maintained that he was denied a speaking spot because he intended to give a speech about his opposition to abortion and the party's abortion-rights plank. Convention leaders, meanwhile, stressed convention process and Clinton's overall message discipline rather than reopening the platform fight on the floor.

After the convention, Casey told The New York Times, "I support the ticket. Period." Other anti-abortion Democrats, however, did appear during the convention, though they did not use their speaking slots to force a floor fight over abortion in the way Casey had sought.

The dispute later became one of the best-remembered controversies of the 1992 convention and was repeatedly revisited in later reporting on abortion politics within the Democratic Party.

== Party platform ==
The party platform was more centrist than many earlier Democratic platforms and was widely described in contemporary reporting as reflecting Clinton's moderate views and the party's new positioning. Its preamble described a "New Covenant with the American People" and rejected both "the do-nothing government of the last twelve years" and "the big government theory" associated with older Democratic politics, instead offering "a third way".

The platform emphasized public and private investment, deficit reduction, work and welfare reform, family leave, expanded health coverage, education reform, and a more activist but more efficient state. It also explicitly supported public school choice, strong civil-rights enforcement, gay and lesbian civil-rights protections, and a national economic strategy built around high-skill, high-wage growth.

=== Abortion ===
Expanding on previous support for reproductive rights, the 1992 platform explicitly stated that Democrats stood behind "the right of every woman to choose, consistent with Roe v. Wade, regardless of ability to pay," and that the party supported "a national law to protect that right".

== Nomination votes ==
=== President ===
Democratic National Convention presidential vote, 1992
Candidate	Votes	Percentage
Bill Clinton	3,372	78.64%
Jerry Brown	596	13.90%
Paul Tsongas	209	4.87%
Robert P. Casey	10	0.23%
Pat Schroeder	8	0.18%
Larry Agran	3	0.07%
Ronald Daniels	1	0.02%
Al Gore	1	0.02%
Joe Simonetta	1	0.02%
Abstentions	53	1.24%
Totals	4,288	100.00%

=== Vice president ===
Gore was nominated by acclamation on a voice vote.

== Notable events ==
The convention also produced several moments that stood out in television coverage. The speeches by AIDS activist Elizabeth Glaser and Clinton adviser Bob Hattoy were widely described as some of the most emotional and memorable addresses of the gathering. Tuesday night's women's segment, built around the so-called "Year of the Woman," likewise drew substantial attention both inside the hall and in outside coverage.

As Clinton completed his acceptance speech, the convention hall erupted in the now-famous balloon drop to the sound of "Don't Stop", helping cement the song's lasting association with Clinton's 1992 campaign and later inauguration.

== Reception and political impact ==
The convention was generally regarded as a political success for Clinton and the Democrats. Journalists emphasized its discipline and the absence of the kind of public intraparty conflict that had damaged Democratic nominees in previous cycles. The immediate polling effect was substantial: a Washington Post-ABC News poll conducted during the convention found Clinton moving from 30 percent to 42 percent in one week, while Bush stood at 30 percent and Perot dropped to 20 percent. A contemporaneous Los Angeles Times poll taken as the convention closed showed Clinton leading Bush 52 percent to 32 percent, with much of the shift coming from former Perot backers. Gallup Polls' head-to-head polls between Clinton and Bush recorded a 16-point increase in support for Clinton after the convention. This was the greatest-recorded "convention bounce" in the history of Gallup polling.

The political advantage gained in New York proved durable. Although Bush received a smaller convention bounce of his own after the Republican National Convention in August and Perot returned to the race in October, Clinton remained ahead for the rest of the campaign and went on to win both the popular vote and the Electoral College.

== See also ==
- Bill Clinton 1992 presidential campaign
- 1992 Democratic Party presidential primaries
- 1991 Libertarian National Convention
- 1992 Republican National Convention
- 1992 United States presidential election
- History of the United States Democratic Party
- List of Democratic National Conventions
- United States presidential nominating convention
- The Last Party (film)

Preceded by 1988; Atlanta, Georgia	Democratic National Conventions	Succeeded by 1996; Chicago, Illinois
