= Bob Hattoy =

American activist (1950–2007)

- Born: November 1, 1950; Providence, Rhode Island
- Died: March 4, 2007 (aged 56); Sacramento, California
- Occupation: AIDS activist

Bob Hattoy (November 1, 1950 – March 4, 2007) was an American activist on issues related to gay rights, AIDS and the environment.

== Life ==
Robert Hattoy was born in Providence, Rhode Island, on November 1, 1950. His father was a machinist tool and dye maker and his mother a school secretary He moved with his family to California as a teenager. He played the cymbals in a local marching band. He attended several colleges without obtaining a degree. He worked for a time at Disneyland and then on the staff of Los Angeles City Councilman Zev Yaroslavsky.

Hattoy was California regional director of the Sierra Club from 1981 to 1992. When he heard of a proposal to name a national forest after Ronald Reagan, he compared it to "naming a day-care center after W.C. Fields."

He was diagnosed as HIV-positive in 1990. He joined Bill Clinton's presidential campaign during the 1992 primary and then learned that he had AIDS-related lymphoma and began chemotherapy treatments.

Hattoy, speaking at the 1992 Democratic National Convention in New York City said: He is often cited as the first person with AIDS to address a national convention; however, Keith Gann, a person with AIDS from Minnesota, had addressed the 1988 Democratic National Convention.

This is difficult. I am a gay man with AIDS. If there is any honor in having this disease, it is the honor of being part of the gay and lesbian community in America. We have watched our friends and lovers die but we have not given up. Gay men and lesbians created community health clinics, provided educational materials, opened food kitchens, and held the hands of the dying in hospices. The gay and lesbian community is a family in the best sense of the word.... Listen, I don't want to die. I don't want to die. But I don't want to live in an America where the president sees me as the enemy. I can face dying because of a disease. But not because of politics.

Beginning in 1993 Hattoy worked in the Clinton administration as a deputy in the White House Office of Personnel. In March 1993, when Clinton said he was considering restrictions on the roles gays and lesbians might be allowed to take in the military, Hattoy compared that to "restricting gays and lesbians to jobs as florists and hairdressers" in civilian life.

The next year, to decrease his visibility, the administration appointed him White House liaison on environmental matters at the Interior Department, where he remained until 1999. He also served as chairman of the research committee of the Presidential Commission on HIV/AIDS. According to James Carville, investigators for federal special prosecutor Kenneth Starr repeatedly questioned Hattoy in April 1997 if he had helped place gays and lesbians in prominent positions in the Clinton administration.

In 1994, in an interview with POZ magazine, Hattoy criticized several administration officials for failing to develop an overall AIDS policy and discussed how his outspokenness had prompted his reassignment to the Interior Department.

He delayed taking protease inhibitors out of concern that they might prove dangerous, until late 1996 when he felt noticeably weaker.

He worked briefly as a political consultant until California Gov. Gray Davis appointed him to the California Fish and Game Commission in 2002, then to a six-year term in 2003. He was elected the commission's president in February 2007.

In 2003, he joined the effort to prevent the sale of genetically modified fish in California, the only state to have such a ban. He had concerns about the fishes impact to California's waterways.

He was an outspoken critic of presidents Clinton, Ronald Reagan and George H. W. Bush for their policies on issues such as conservation, the government's response to HIV/AIDS, and the "ban" on gay and bisexual men and women serving openly in the U.S. military. Clinton press secretary Dee Dee Myers described his dual role in the Clinton administration: "The problem was that whatever he said was both funny and revealing. He wasn't wrong, but he wasn't necessarily helpful to the administration cause.... He had one foot inside and one foot outside. He was Bob first and foremost."

According to The New York Times, Hattoy was "the first gay man with AIDS many Americans had knowingly laid eyes on."

Hattoy battled recurrent pneumonia and other complications several times and suffered a bone marrow infection a few weeks before his death, but was generally healthy throughout his years with AIDS. He died at UC Davis Medical Center in Sacramento, California, from AIDS-related causes on March 4, 2007, aged 56.
