= Journal of Endodontics =

- Discipline: Endodontics
- Language: English
- Edited by: Kenneth M. Hargreaves

Publication details
- History: 1975–present
- Publisher: Elsevier
- Frequency: Monthly
- Impact factor: 4.171 (2020)

Standard abbreviations
- ISO 4: J. Endod.

Indexing
- ISSN: 0099-2399 (print); 1878-3554 (web)

Links
- Journal homepage

The Journal of Endodontics (JOE) is the official journal of the American Association of Endodontists and is published by Elsevier. It is a monthly journal that was established in 1975 and publishes scientific articles, case reports, and studies comparing different tools, materials, and methods used in endodontic treatment.

According to the Journal Citation Reports, Journal of Endodontics has a 2020 impact factor of 4.171, ranking it 16th out of 91 in the category Dentistry, Oral Surgery & Medicine.
