= Elizabeth Glaser =

American AIDS activist and child advocate

- Born: Elizabeth Meyer; November 11, 1947; New York City, New York, U.S.
- Died: December 3, 1994 (aged 47); Los Angeles, California, U.S.
- Burial place: Sharon Memorial Park; Sharon, Massachusetts
- Known for: AIDS activist and celebrity spouse Contracted HIV through blood transfusion
- Spouse: Paul Michael Glaser (m. 1980)
- Children: Ariel Glaser (1981–1988); Jake Glaser (b. 1984)

Elizabeth Glaser (née Meyer; November 11, 1947 – December 3, 1994) was an American AIDS activist and child advocate married to actor and director Paul Michael Glaser. She contracted HIV very early in the AIDS epidemic after receiving an HIV-contaminated blood transfusion in 1981 while giving birth. Like many other HIV-infected mothers, Glaser unknowingly passed the virus to her infant daughter, Ariel, who died in 1988.

== Life ==
Elizabeth Glaser was born November 11, 1947, in New York City and raised in Hewlett Harbor, New York. She became the exhibit director of the Los Angeles Children's Museum.

Glaser graduated in 1965 from what is now the Lawrence Woodmere Academy.

=== Illness ===
In 1981, very early in the AIDS epidemic, Glaser contracted HIV after receiving an HIV-contaminated blood transfusion after giving birth. Like other HIV-infected mothers at the time, Glaser unknowingly passed the virus to her infant daughter, Ariel, through breastfeeding. Ariel developed advanced AIDS at a time when the medical community knew very little about the disease, and there were no available treatment options. Members of the public reacted with fear, and Los Angeles preschools would not allow Glaser's then-4-year-old daughter to attend.

Early in 1987, the U.S. Food and Drug Administration finally approved AZT as an effective drug to extend the lives of AIDS patients, but the approval only extended to adults. With their daughter's condition rapidly deteriorating, the Glasers fought to have her treated with AZT intravenously. However, the treatment came too late, and the child succumbed to the disease late in summer 1988.

That year, Glaser created the Elizabeth Glaser Pediatric AIDS Foundation (EGPAF), to raise funds for pediatric HIV/AIDS research.

Glaser entered the national spotlight as a speaker at the 1992 Democratic National Convention, where she criticized the federal government's under-funding of AIDS research and its lack of initiative in tackling the AIDS crisis.

On December 3, 1994, Elizabeth Glaser died at the age of 47, from complications of HIV/AIDS, at her home in Santa Monica. Her son Jake, born in 1984, contracted HIV from his mother in utero, but has remained relatively healthy due to a mutation of the CCR5 gene that protects his white blood cells. As of November 2021, he lives in Venice Beach with his girlfriend, Kerry Corridan, and is the owner of a plant-based food company called Cool Foods. He is also an ambassador for the Elizabeth Glaser Pediatric AIDS Foundation (EGPAF), for which he speaks to at-risk children around the world, and mentors HIV-positive youth in Africa.

== Legacy ==
The Elizabeth Glaser Pediatric AIDS Foundation is a major force in funding the study of pediatric HIV problems and tackling juvenile AIDS, both domestically and globally. Glaser's book In the Absence of Angels (1991), written with journalist Laura Palmer, was described as "a handbook of how the connected make waves in America".

The AIDS Memorial Quilt contains five panels with Elizabeth Glaser and her daughter Ariel Glaser's name on each of them, three panels with Elizabeth Glaser's name alone on each of them, and two panels with Ariel Glaser's name alone on each of them.

== See also ==
Martin Gaffney - Gaffney contracted the HIV virus from his wife Mutsuko Gaffney who, like Elizabeth Glaser, was infected via a blood transfusion and had two children contract HIV from their mother in utero.
