= Dental Materials =

- Discipline: Dentistry, materials science
- Language: English
- Edited by: David C. Watts

Publication details
- History: 1985-present
- Publisher: Elsevier
- Frequency: Bimonthly
- Impact factor: 5.304 (2020)

Standard abbreviations
- ISO 4: Dent. Mater.

Indexing
- CODEN: DEMAEP
- ISSN: 0109-5641 (print); 1879-0097 (web)
- OCLC no.: 223084928

Links
- Journal homepage; Online access; Online archive

Dental Materials is a bimonthly peer-reviewed scientific journal covering the study of dental materials. It was established in 1985 and is published by Elsevier on behalf of the Academy of Dental Materials, of which it is the official journal. This journal does not have advertisements. The editor-in-chief is David C. Watts (University of Manchester). According to the Journal Citation Reports, the journal has a 2020 impact factor of 5.304.
